= Jewels of Anne of Denmark =

Jewels belonging to the Scottish and English queen

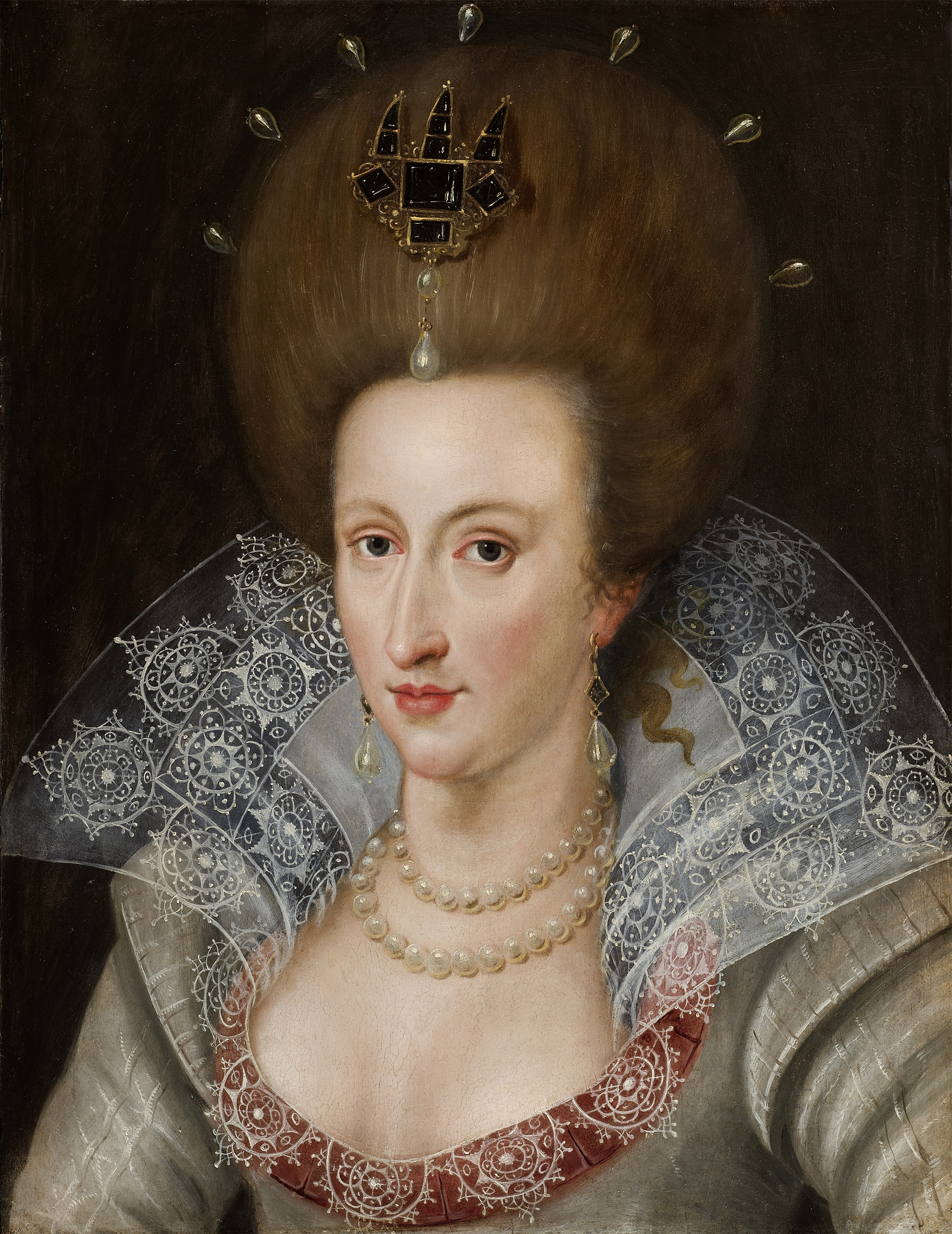
Anne of Denmark, depicted with a diamond aigrette and pearl hair attire, by John de Critz, 1605

The jewels of Anne of Denmark (1574–1619), wife of James VI and I and queen consort of Scotland and England, are known from accounts and inventories, and their depiction in portraits by artists including Paul van Somer. A few pieces survive. Some modern historians prefer the name "Anna" to "Anne", following the spelling of numerous examples of her signature.

== Goldsmiths and jewellers ==
=== Jewels and the royal wedding ===
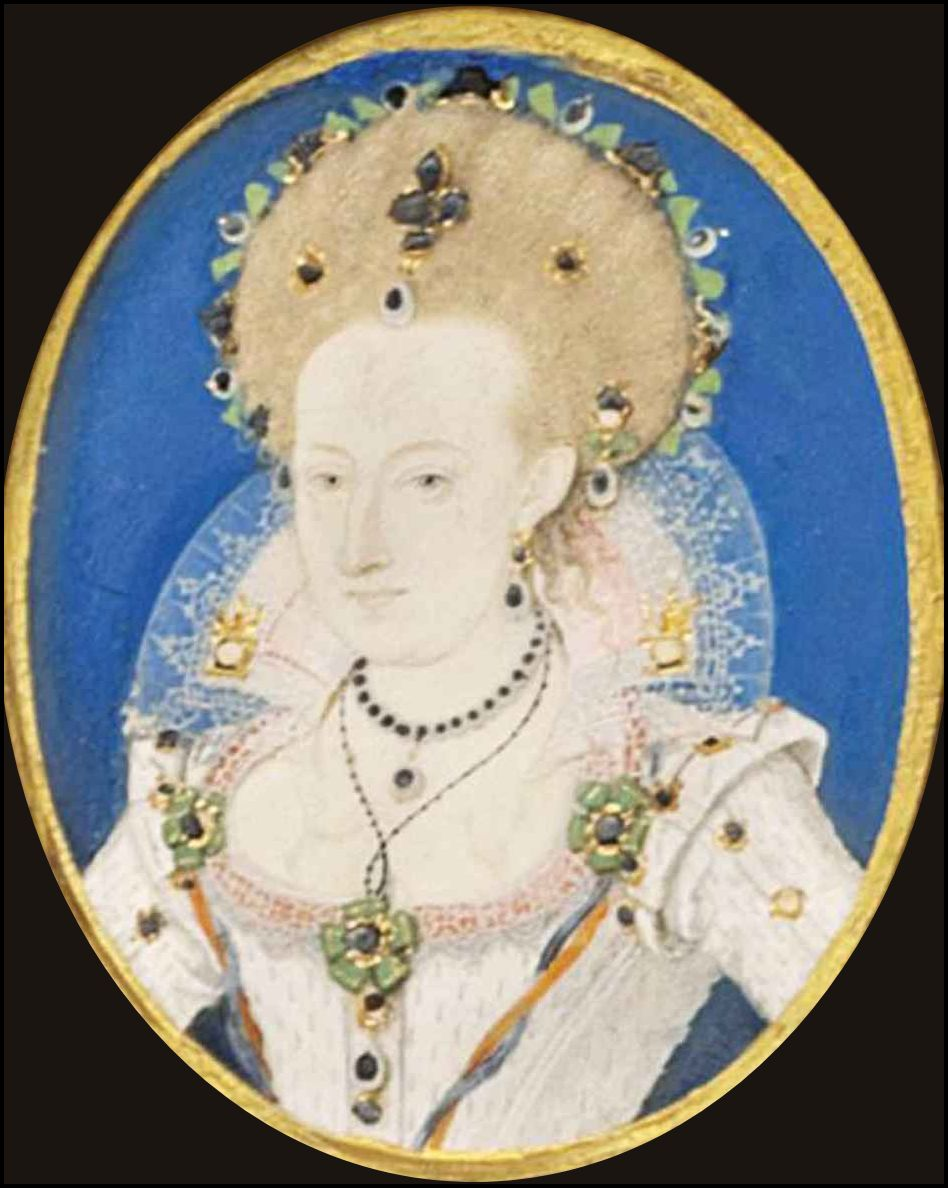
Anne of Denmark, by Nicholas Hilliard

James VI and Anne of Denmark were married by proxy in August 1589 and in person when they met at Oslo. Lord Dingwall and the King's proxy, the Earl Marischal bought a jewel in Denmark, given to her at "the time of the contracting of the marriage". A diamond ring was involved in these ceremonies, described as "a great ring of gold enamelled set with five diamonds, hand in hand in the midst, called the espousall ring of Denmark". This ring, and a gold jewel with the crowned initials "J.A.R" picked out in diamonds, were earmarked as important Scottish jewels and brought to England by King James in 1603, in the keeping of his favourite, Sir George Home.

James' goldsmiths returned some royal pieces to him at Leith before he set out, jewels they held as pledges for loans. While he was in Denmark, James VI ordered his chancellor, John Maitland of Thirlestane to give jewels to Christian IV and his mother Sophie of Mecklenburg, to other royals at the wedding of Elisabeth of Denmark and Henry Julius, Duke of Brunswick-Lüneburg on 19 April 1590, and to the admiral Peder Munk. These gifts included four great table diamonds and two great rubies set in gold rings which the master of the royal wardrobe William Keith of Delny had brought to Denmark.

When Anne of Denmark arrived in Scotland in May 1590 the city of Edinburgh organised a ceremony of Royal Entry. The queen was led to various sites in the town, and finally a rich jewel was lowered to her on a length of silk ribbon from the Netherbow Gate. This jewel, comprising a large emerald and diamond set in gold with pendant pearls, had been enlarged and remade by David Gilbert, a nephew of Michael Gilbert, from an older royal jewel which James VI had pledged to the town for a loan. The jewel was called the "A", probably referring to the crowned initial or cipher of "A" embroidered with gold thread on its purple velvet case. Her Scottish crown was described in later inventories:

A Crowne of Scotland for the Queen garnished with diamondes, rubies, pearles, one sapher and one emerald.

Soon after her coronation, the Earl of Worcester came as ambassador to Scotland from Elizabeth I. He brought Anne a richly wrought cloak set with jewels, a carkat of pearls with a tablet (a necklace), and a clock or watch.

=== Jacob Kroger ===
She brought a German jeweller Jacob Kroger with her to Scotland in May 1590. Kroger is known to have made fixing and buttons for the queen's costume, he described his work to an English border official John Carey in 1594. Kroger fled to England with some of the queen's jewels and a French stable worker called Guillaume Martin. He was returned to Edinburgh and executed.

Kroger may have been replaced by a French goldsmith called "Clei" of whom little is known. Clei was dismissed in 1597. Accounts mention a payment to Anne's servant "Kay" in 1591, possibly the same person.

=== Gift-giving and the baptism of Prince Henry ===
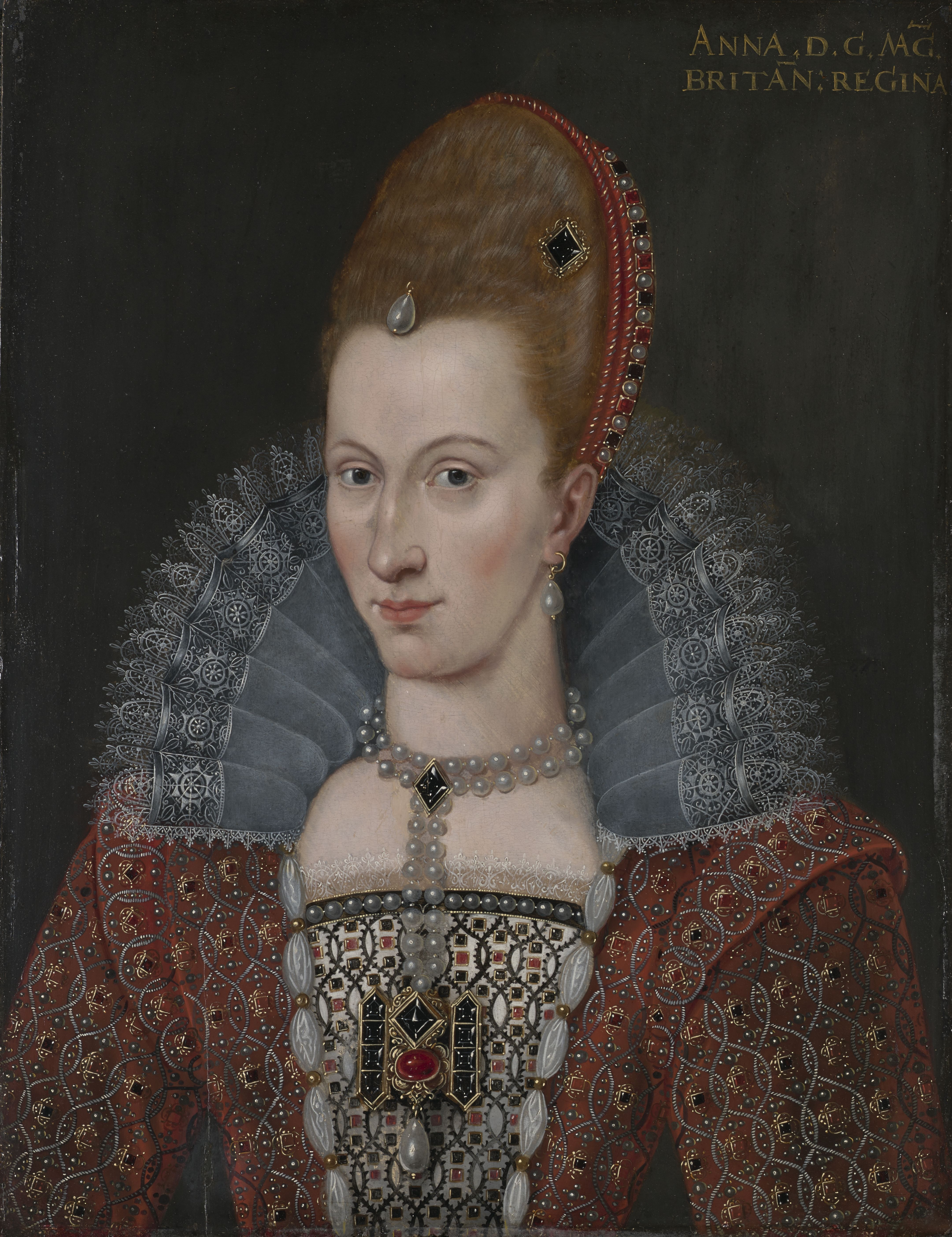
Anne of Denmark depicted wearing a jewel with a large diamond and a cabochon ruby, possibly the Great Harry or H of Scotland, GAC.

When Anne of Denmark was pregnant in December 1593, it was said that James VI gave Anne of Denmark the "greatest part of his jewels", possibly including the large table-cut diamond and cabochon ruby pendant known as the "Great H of Scotland" which had belonged to Mary, Queen of Scots. Her son, Prince Henry, was born at Stirling Castle on 19 February. On 8 April 1594, possibly marking her "churching", James VI gave Anne a group of jewels set in gold by Thomas Foulis including two rubies and 24 diamonds. He sent her an opal ring, a gift described as a "token".

In August 1594 her son Prince Henry was baptised at Stirling Castle. The ceremony involved a "ducal crown" which was placed on a table during the ceremony. It was "a low crown competent for a duke, set with diamonds, sapphires, emeralds and rubies". A low crown was a circlet without imperial arches. This crown was placed on Henry's head by James VI or held by the King after the ceremony when Henry's titles were pronounced in the King's Hall in the Palace.

The ambassadors brought gifts. Joachim von Bassewitz was sent by Anne's grandfather, the Duke of Mecklenburg, with a gold chain or necklace for the queen, described as "very fair and antique". By antique it was meant the piece was made in modern classicising renaissance style. The necklace comprised rubies, chrysolites, and hyacinths set in roses. Bassewitz explained that it represented the combined English roses of York and Lancaster. It was suitable to wear on the front of gown "made after the French fashion, as the Queene now doth use".

Adam Crusius, the ambassador from the Duke of Brunswick brought his master's miniature portrait in a locket with his name set in diamonds and a scene of the death of Actaeon watched by Diana and her nymphs, his blood running from the "byting of the Doggs" picked out with polished rubies. A large pendant showing a scene of Diana and Actaeon is depicted worn on the sleeve in a 1589 portrait of Frances Brydges, Lady Chandos, by Hieronimo Custodis at Woburn Abbey.

James VI gave Anne a pointed diamond ring shortly before the baptism of their son Robert at Dunfermline Palace in May 1602.

=== Cardinal Cajetan's jewel ===
In 1595, the Catholic Father John Myreton or Morton brought a jewel of gold with an ivory depiction of the crucifixion set under crystal to the Scottish court, sent by the Cardinal Enrico Caetani, known as "Cardinal Cajetan". Myreton was a brother of the laird of Cambo near Kingsbarns, and had been at college with Thomas Morison, author of Liber novus de Metallorum causis et Transubstantione (Frankfurt, 1593). The jewel, suitable for wearing, was given to Anne of Denmark. The English diplomat Robert Bowes reported this incident, and the Danish diplomat Christian Barnekow also heard about the gift.

=== New Year's Day gifts in Scotland ===
It was customary at the Scottish court to give gifts on New Years Day. In January 1596, James VI gave Anne of Denmark a pair of gold bracelets set with stones and pearls, a ruby ring, and a tablet and carcan set with diamonds and rubies. The gifts were supplied by the goldsmith and financier Thomas Foulis from the money James VI received as a subsidy from Elizabeth I and the custom duty of the Scottish gold mines.

Some jewels appear in costume accounts which were also administered by Foulis. Anne of Denmark owned clothes embroidered with pearls. In 1597 she ordered an elaborate gown embroidered with jet beads and buttons which proved too heavy to wear and her tailor was ordered to start again.

She gave a jewel set with diamond worth 1,500 crowns, described as a "brassiner", to Henrietta Stewart, Countess of Huntly, in January 1599. The Countess had attended her during her pregnancy and the birth of Princess Margaret at Dalkeith Palace in December 1598.

In later years the gifts appear in the regular royal treasurer's accounts. In January 1600, James gave her a great emerald set around with diamonds and another jewel set with 29 diamonds, and in January 1601 a gift provided by George Heriot cost £1,333 Scots.

Rumours circulated that Anne was involved in Gowrie Conspiracy in 1600, and Robert Carey reported a letter had been found from her to the Earl of Gowrie, urging him to visit the royal court and enclosing the gift of a valuable bracelet.

=== George Heriot ===
From the early 1590s, George Heriot sold pieces to Anne of Denmark, and he was appointed goldsmith to the Queen on 17 July 1597. Several of her Scottish accounts and bills were checked and paid by William Schaw, Chamberlain of Dumfermline. In August 1593, Heriot supplied an emerald for 40 crowns and a little emerald for 3 crowns, an earring with seven diamonds was 20 crowns, with other jewels. Anne gave Heriot a gold "carcat" necklace and tablet set with rubies and diamonds from her collection as a part payment of 1,000 crowns towards his bill.

Itemised jewels supplied by Heriot include a diamond feather with an emerald to wear in a hat, "ane fethir for ane hatt quherein thair is sett ane greit Imerod & ane uther Jewell conteining lxxiij dyamentis".

In August 1599 Heriot was paid £400 Sterling from the English annuity, a sum of money which Queen Elizabeth sent to Scotland, for jewels delivered to Anne of Denmark. He also provided items of embroidered costume and hats to the queen and her children.

A surviving chain or necklace thought to have been made in Edinburgh for an Edinburgh merchant or his wife, resembles a design by Corvinianus Saur, an Augsburg jeweller who worked for Christian IV in 1596 and became his court jeweller in 1613. This piece may demonstrate close links in fashion between the royal courts of Scotland and Denmark, and the upper reaches of Edinburgh society. The links of the necklace, held in a private collection, have a central diamond surrounded by open gold work enamelled black with a simple crown.

=== Heriot and loans to the King and Queen ===
George Heriot made loans to Anne of Denmark, often secured on jewels. On 29 July 1601 he returned a feather or aigrette of rubies and diamonds set around an emerald which she had pledged for a loan. A request for a loan (not dated) written by Anne survives, "Gordg Heriott, I ernestlie dissyr youe present to send me tua hundrethe pundes withe all expidition becaus I man hest me away presentlie, Anna R."

A letter from James VI to Mark Kerr of Newbattle of June 1599 mentions that he had instructed John Preston of Fentonbarns to repay from tax receipts a sum of money advanced on the security of some of the queen's jewels to George Heriot. James VI required "the relief of our said dearest bedfellow's jewels engaged". Preston however, had reserved the money for the costs of an embassy to France. As the departure of his ambassador was delayed, James VI wanted Mark Kerr to ensure that Heriot was now paid. The King thought the transaction "touched us so nearly in honour". The letter is often quoted as an example of the queen's extravagance although it does not mention that this particular loan, which James was anxious to repay from his revenue, had been made to the queen.

A warrant from James VI dated July 1598 to the treasurer, Walter Stewart of Blantyre, requests 3,000 merks to be used to redeem jewels belonging to the queen pledged by his direction and command. The money was given to Andrew Stewart, Lord Ochiltree, who paid off a loan (possibly from Heriot) and redeemed two of the queen's jewels. James VI borrowed £6,720 from Heriot for which he pledged a jewel set with 74 diamonds, probably one of his own hat feathers. In 1603, Anne pledged a jewel with 73 diamonds, with a thin table diamond and two emeralds, to Heriot as security for a debt to him of £7,539-13s-4d Scots. After the Union of the Crowns, she continued to obtain jewels and loans from Heriot, occasionally ordering the chamberlain of her estates, Lord Carew, to make repayments.

A gold cross, with seven diamonds and two rubies, pawned by Anne of Denmark to Heriot in May 1609, seems to be mentioned in several earlier inventories and accounts, and probably had belonged to Mary, Queen of Scots and her mother, Mary of Guise. In March 1613, to finance her progress to Bath, Anne pawned a "fair round jewel" with a diamond to Heriot for £1,200. The jewel was delivered to "Lady Rommeny", Rebecca Romney, the widow of a London merchant, by George Abercromby, a gentleman of the wardrobe.

=== Elias Le Tellier ===
A French craftsman Elias Le Tellier was described as one of the Queen's goldsmiths in 1600. His name was often written as "Elie", and he may have been the goldsmith "Clei" mentioned in Birrel's Diary. James or Jacques Le Tellier worked as a goldsmith for James VI. In 1597, Elias Le Tellier carried messages and money for the English ambassador Robert Bowes.

Elias and his son Harry Le Tellier and a colleague Samson de la Granges quarrelled with an Edinburgh goldsmith, James Crawfurd. Anne of Denmark's chamberlain William Schaw was able to intervene in the legal action resulting from their feud. Elias Le Tellier lived in a tenement in the Canongate and the owner, a merchant Robert Johnston, sought to have him evicted. Samson de la Granges or des Granges was the father of the painter David des Granges. Elias' wife Esther Le Tellier was a silkwoman to Anne of Denmark and possibly a member of the Granges family. James Le Tellier twice attended baptisms in the Canongate in 1600 and 1601. Elias Le Grange and Esther moved to London and resided at Charing Cross, and continued to be associated with George Heriot.

=== Thomas Foulis and Cornelius ===
Anne of Denmark also obtained jewels in the 1590s from another Edinburgh goldsmith Thomas Foulis, including a pair of bracelets set with gemstones and pearls, and a "tablet all diamonds" with a "carcan of diamonds and rubies". These were New Year's Day gifts from King James.

Foulis and his partner Robert Jousie were involved in collecting the King's English subsidy in London, and bought a sapphire engraved with Queen Elizabeth's portrait for Anne of Denmark in 1598 made by Cornelius Dreghe, an associate of Abraham Harderet. There are records of similar sapphire portraits. In 1594, Lord Howard gave Elizabeth a headdress including "her Maiesties pycture Cutt uppon A Safyor in the Middest".

Cornelius "Draggie" turned up in Edinburgh in 1601, attempting to set up a weaver's workshop to exploit generous subsidies for expert craftsmen, but the other weavers protested he was a lapidary, not a weaver. Cornelius's son Daniel was born in Edinburgh, and George Heriot was a witness his baptism in the Canongate.

=== Heriot and the court in England ===
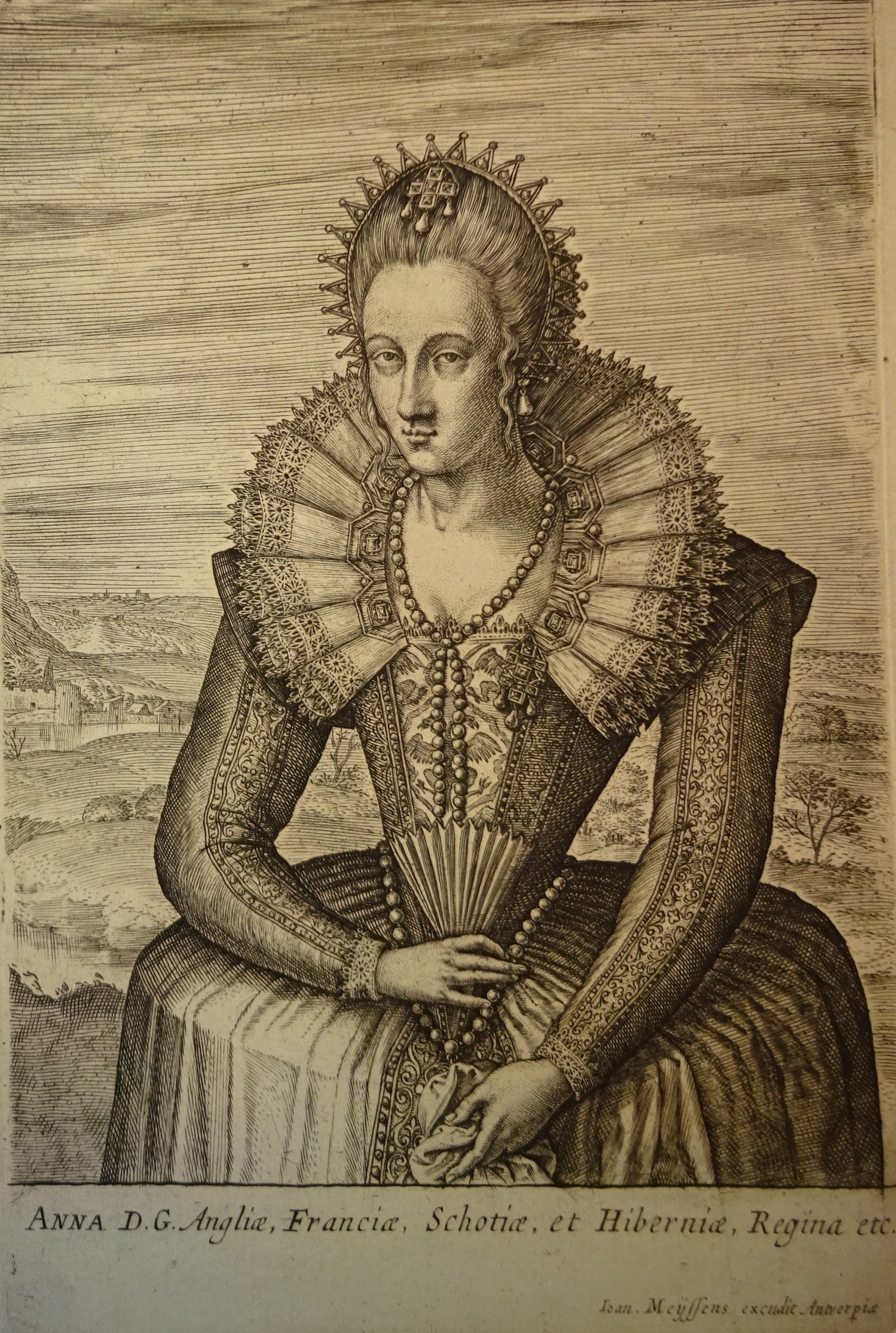
Anne of Denmark as Queen of England

Heriot's surviving bills for jewellery supplied to Anna of Denmark mostly date from 1604 to 1615, totalling around £40,000. He supplied a "tablet" for a portrait set with rubies and diamonds for £26 Sterling. One account was audited by Justinian Povey in February 1617. Her servants and chamberers Jean Drummond, Margaret Hartsyde and Dorothy Silking often dealt with him and made payments on her behalf. Hartsyde and Silking looked after the jewels that Anne wore, and may have dressed her. When she moved from place to place on progress, her jewels were kept secure by William Bell, clerk of the jewel coffers. She frequently wore a miniature portrait of Isabella Clara Eugenia and Heriot mended its locket case twice. She was less keen on full size portraits of the Archduchess and her husband and considered giving them away to a friend in Scotland.

Heriot made at least four jewels in the form of a diamond-set anchor for Anne. Heriot provided a chain of gems and pearls with her portrait miniature which Anne of Denmark gave to the Spanish ambassador, the Count of Villamediana in October 1605, and she gave his senior companion, the Constable of Castile, a rather more expensive diamond encrusted locket made by John Spilman containing her portrait and James'. Heriot made the diamond-set jewel which the queen presented to Jane Meautys on her wedding to Sir William Cornwallis in 1610. Heriot also supplied jewels to Prince Henry.

=== A miniature case and a pair of earrings ===
Surviving pieces made by George Heriot, or attributed to Heriot, include a gold miniature case set with her initials in diamonds, now held by the Fitzwilliam Museum, which the queen may have gifted to her lady-in-waiting Anne Livingstone, The case is probably the work of Heriot or his workshop, and the miniature is by an artist of the studio of Nicholas Hilliard. The Fitzwilliam miniature case has two monograms, one set with diamonds and the other in enamel, with the closed "S", the "s fermé" or "fermesse", a symbol used in correspondence of the period (and in Anne of Denmark's circles) as a mark of affection. The "S" may also perhaps allude to Anne of Denmark's mother, Sophie of Mecklenburg-Güstrow. A sketch for the monograms or ciphers ("CAR" and "ASR") corresponding to the jewel survives in Heriot's papers held by the National Records of Scotland.

A pair of earrings which include the enamelled face of an African man, in a private collection, are attributed to Heriot. Earrings itemised by Heriot in 1609 include"two pendants made as more's heads and all sett with diamonds price £70." She also had "a pendant with a Moore's head". She had African servants attending her horse, in Scotland and in England. These pieces may have reflected her fascination with the representation of African people in the theatre, as in her Masque of Blackness. Elizabethan aristocrats had also worn jewellery decorated with images of African or Moorish people, in 1561 the Earl of Pembroke owned a brooch with an agate cameo of "a woman morens hedde with a white launde upon the hedde", and the "Gresley Jewel" includes an onyx cameo of this description and two gold African archers. Such cameos were supplied by a London goldsmith, John Mabbe. Kim F. Hall points to wider cultural phenomenon, that these representations of black Africans were connected in culture with marketing of new kinds of profitable foreign luxury goods, and the roles of African people as household servants or slaves in colonial labour.

=== Jewels with initials ===
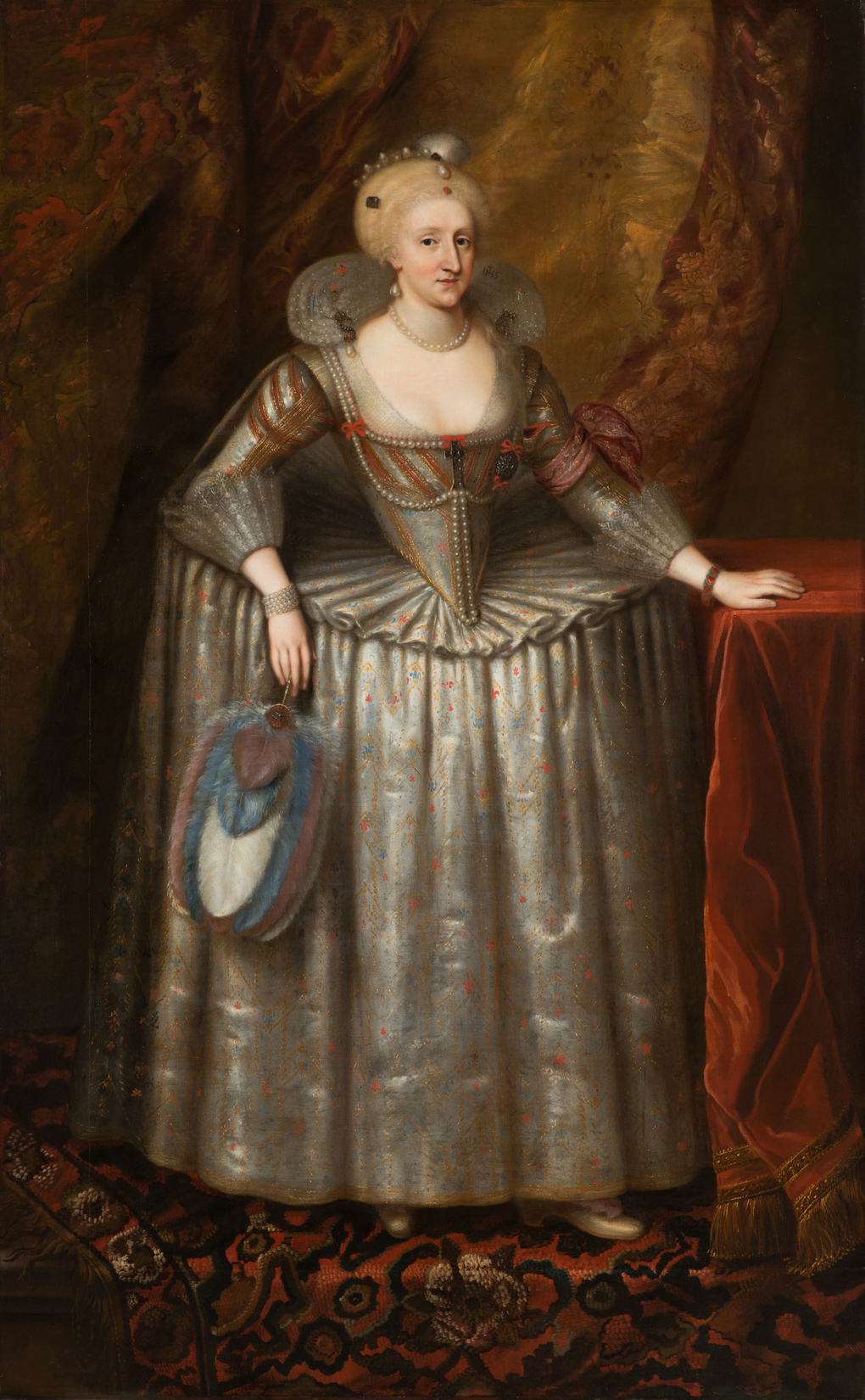
Anne of Denmark, after Paul van Somer, RCT

Heriot and other goldsmiths made jewels for Anne of Denmark with ciphers or initials picked out with diamonds; "S" presumably for her mother, Sophie of Mecklenburg-Güstrow, "C4" for her brother Christian IV of Denmark, and "AR" for herself. Christian sent a diamond "C4" to Anne in June 1611, a gift noted by the Venetian ambassador Antonio Foscarini. Some jewels made for Christian IV were designed by a Hamburg goldsmith, Jacob Mores (died 1612). His drawings include pieces with diamond-set initials and monograms.

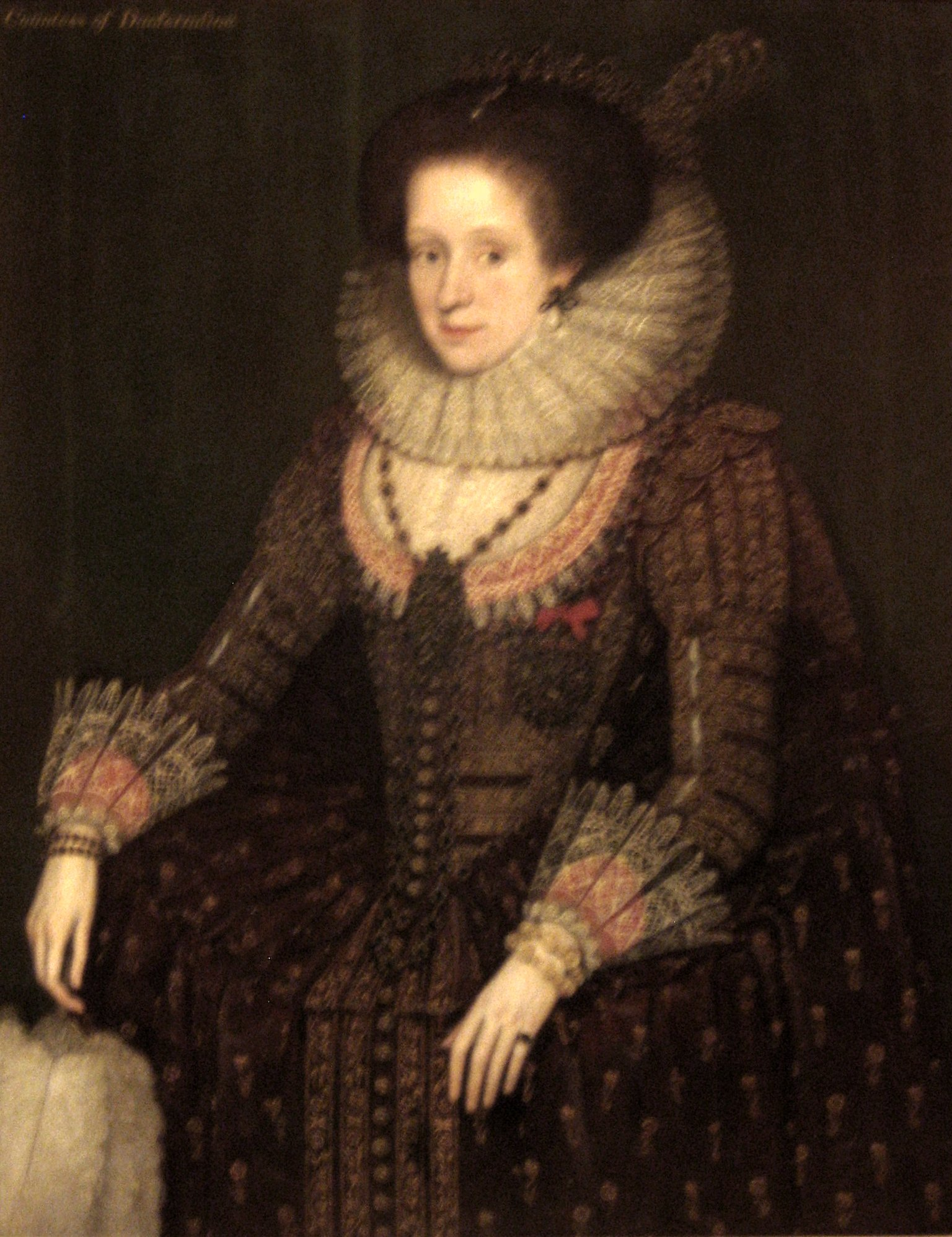
Margaret Hay, Countess of Dunfermline wears a jewel with an "AR" cipher, Marcus Gheeraerts the younger, Dunedin Public Art Gallery

Such jewels with ciphers were depicted in Anne of Denmark's portraits, especially those by Paul van Somer, Marcus Gheeraerts the Younger, and in miniature by Isaac Oliver. Portraits of other women in the queen's circle depict jewelled miniature cases or lockets with an "A", "AR" or "R" for "Anna Regina", including those of Margaret Hay, Countess of Dunfermline, and Elizabeth Grey, Countess of Kent and Anne Livingstone.

The miniature case in the Fitzwilliam has two monograms, one set with diamonds and the other in enamel. "CAR" and "AA", with the closed "S", the "s fermé" or "fermesse", a symbol used in correspondence of the period as a mark of affection. The "S" would also have alluded to Anne's mother, Sophie of Mecklenburg. The case also includes a "CC" cipher, for Christian IV. Heriot supplied a jewel "with an A and two CC sett with diamonds".

In October 1620, King James gave one of Anne of Denmark's lockets to an ambassador from Savoy, the Marquis Villa. It was set with diamonds and contained portraits of the king and queen, the Elector Palatine, and his wife Elizabeth, and was worth about 2,000 crowns. Such jewellery, emphasising family relationships, was commissioned by Anne's family. A gold bracelet with crowned and enamelled "AC" ciphers surviving at Rosenborg Castle may have been Christian IV's gift to his wife Anna Cathrine.

== England and Queen Elizabeth's jewels ==
At the Union of the Crowns in 1603, King James travelled south towards London leaving Anne of Denmark in Scotland. Scaramelli, a Venetian diplomat in London heard a rumour that Anne of Denmark had given away jewels, costume, and hangings to her ladies remaining in Scotland.

In April 1603 King James ordered that some of Elizabeth's jewels, and a hairdresser Blanche Swansted, should be sent to Berwick-upon-Tweed so that Anne of Denmark would appear like an English queen as she crossed the border. James reiterated this request, explaining these jewels were to be selected by Elizabeth's household attendants for Anne's "ordinary apparelling and ornament". James also wrote that she should not think of wearing mourning clothes for Elizabeth.

Anne went to Stirling Castle and argued with the Earl of Mar's family about the custody of her son, Prince Henry, and there she had a miscarriage. The Duke of Lennox returned to Scotland to try and settle matters, bringing Anne four of Queen Elizabeth's jewels. Anne thanked James for "your four jewillis", and also for the resolution of the political aspects of the incident at Stirling.

On 20 May a commission was appointed to inventory the remaining jewels in Mary Radcliffe's keeping and select the most suitable to be reserved as crown jewels. The remainder was returned to Radcliffe on 28 May. Over the coming year the remaining jewels were carefully examined and sorted. Lady Hatton petitioned to become keeper of the queen's jewels and to help dress her. Most of the jewels in Radcliffe's keeping were transferred to the new keeper, Lady Suffolk, or as "jewels of price" secured in the Tower of London. An inventory of some of Elizabeth's jewels made at this time included a brooch with a miniature of Henry VIII placed under a diamond-set crown and other old pieces like a "pater noster" or rosary of garnet, and a gold honeysuckle valued at £12 which may have a badge of Anne Boleyn.

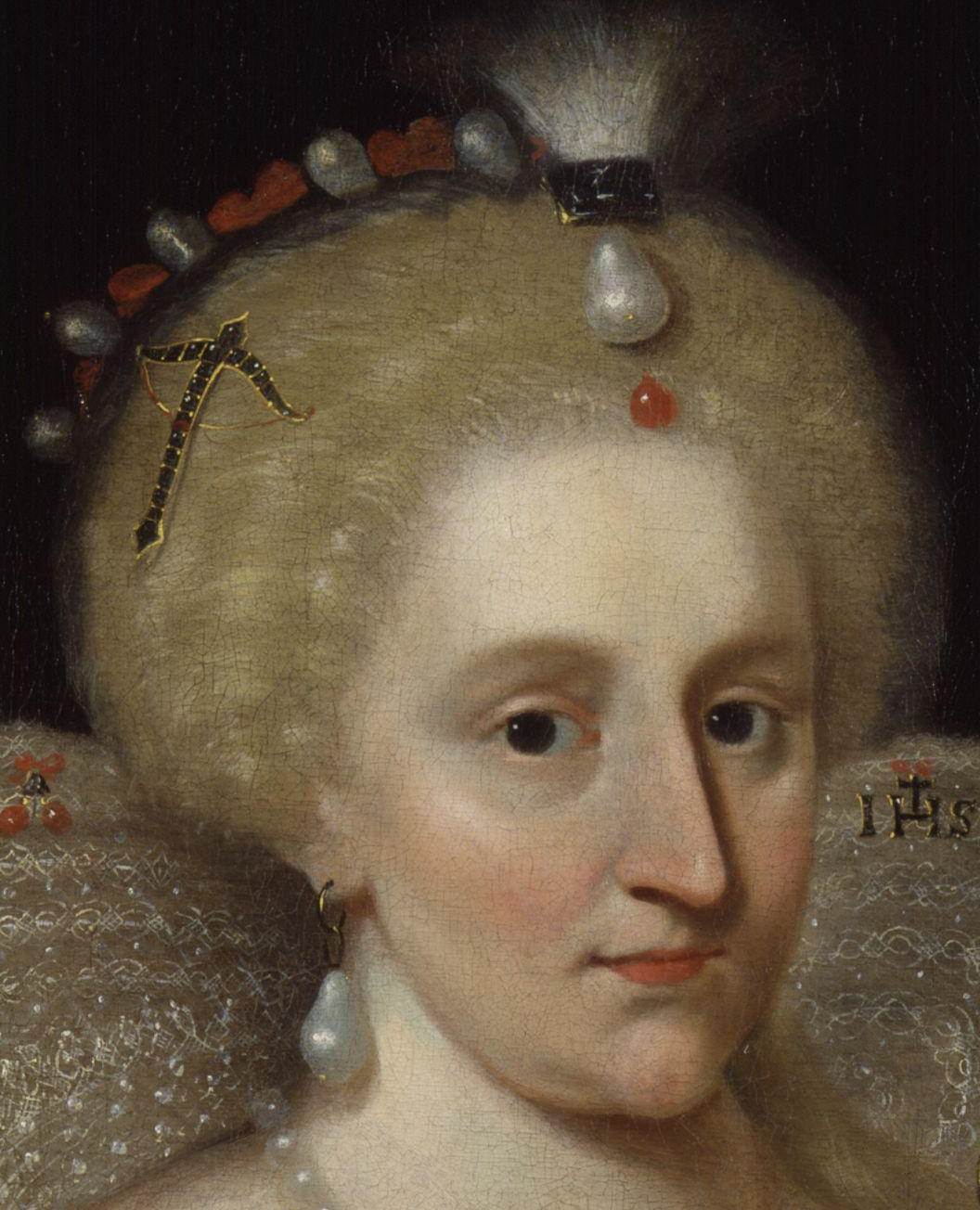
Detail of a portrait by Paul van Somer showing Anne of Denmark wearing the crossbow, a head tire with pearls, and other jewels, National Portrait Gallery, London

Many of Queen Elizabeth's jewels were kept by Mary Radcliffe ready for her to wear. On 13 May 1603 King James had asked her to go through the jewels with Catherine Howard, Countess of Suffolk, presumably to make a selection for Anne of Denmark. A note in an inventory dated 19 May 1603 records that James selected a diamond-set gold crossbow on that day, perhaps to send to Anne of Denmark, who was later depicted wearing a crossbow jewel in her hair. The motif may be related to an emblem of Geffrey Whitney, who sees in the crossbow an allegory of the superiority of wit or ingenuity to brute strength. A crossbow jewel in Anne of Denmark's inventory, perhaps the same piece, had a red enamelled heart at the string.

In response to the king's orders, jewels were taken from the Tower of London on 8 June 1603 and delivered to Lady Suffolk, who had been a keeper of Elizabeth's jewels, to give to Anne of Denmark. Anne of Denmark arrived in York on 11 June. A gift of chain of pearls sent north by James to their daughter Princess Elizabeth arrived at York. Anne admired the pearls and swopped them for a set of ruby buttons (which may have once belonged to Mary, Queen of Scots). Years later, Elizabeth gave the ruby buttons to Frances Tyrrell. Lady Anne Clifford noted that Lady Suffolk, who brought jewels from the Tower of London, was with the queen at Dingley on 24 June. Lady Suffolk joined Anne of Denmark's household and became the keeper of her jewels. In time, responsibility for the queen's jewels passed to Bridget Marrow, a gentlewoman of the queen's privy chamber.

At her welcome to Althorp on 25 June 1603 the Fairy Queen gave her a jewel. The queen normally travelled wearing a face mask to protect her complexion, but in June 1603 she rode towards London without a mask, in order to be seen by her new subjects, and Dudley Carleton wrote, as "for her favour she hath done it some wrong, for in all this journey she hath worn no mask". The French ambassador Christophe de Harlay, Count of Beaumont thought the queen was a Catholic and heard that she secretly wore a little cross at her breast with a relic of the True Cross.

=== The circlet and the English coronation ===
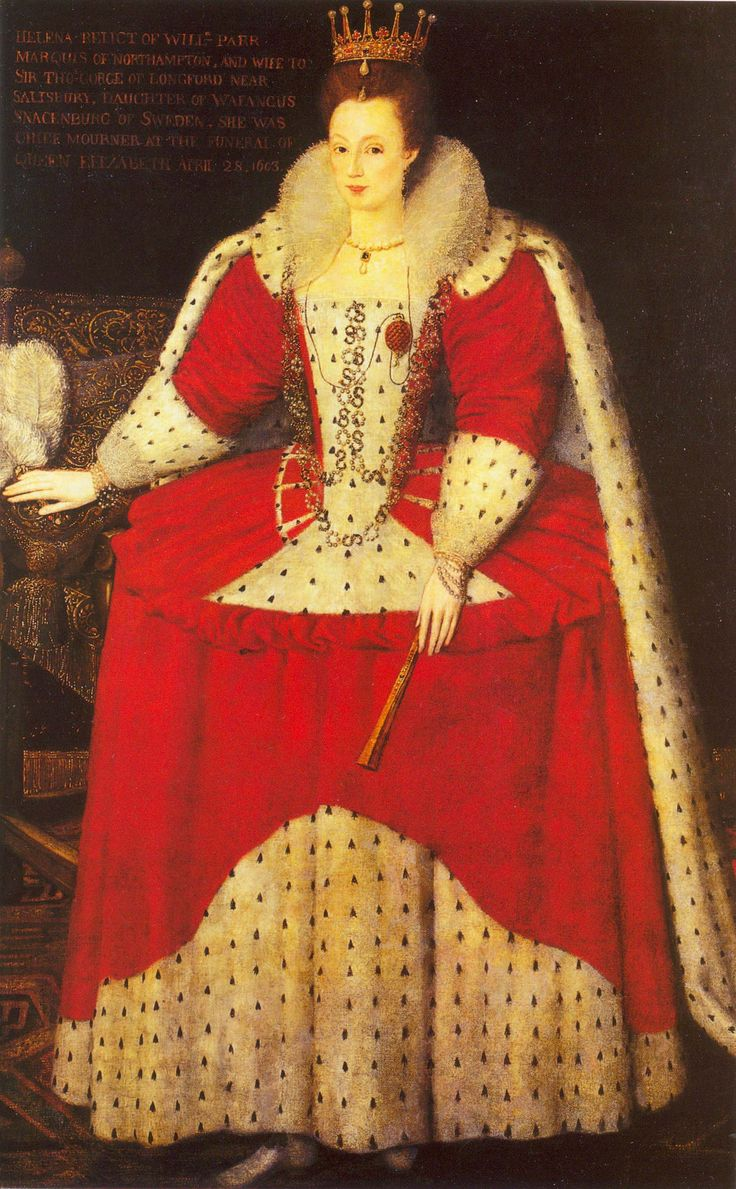
Aristocratic women dressed in ermine with jewelled coronets, including Helena Snakenborg, Marchioness of Northampton, paid homage to Anne of Denmark at Windsor Castle and at Westminster Abbey in July 1603

One of first formal events involving Anne and her jewels was a reception of her ladies and aristocratic women at Windsor Castle on 2 July 1603, an event held in parallel with the installation of James' Knights of the Garter. The "great ladies" paid homage in turn, "most sumptuous in apparel, and exceeding rich and glorious in jewels". This was probably the day when Elizabeth Carey was sworn in as a lady of the privy chamber and "mistress of the sweet coffers".

The coronation of James and Anne was held on 25 July 1603 at Westminster Abbey, and Anne was provided with a jewelled circlet, made by the London goldsmiths John Spilman and William Herrick. The circlet included gemstones salvaged from Queen Elizabeth's jewels. The bill for making the circlet is held at the library of the University of Edinburgh:

Item, made a rich circulet of gould for the Queene, set with dyamonds, rubyes, saphires, emeraldes and pearles, for the fashion thereof __ cl li [£150].

An Order of Service mentions (in Latin) that her hair would be loose about her shoulders, with the gem-set gold circlet on her head. The circlet was described in detail in March 1630; "A circlet of gold new made for our late dear mother Queen Anne, having in the midst eight fair diamonds of various sorts, eight fair rubies, eight emeralds, and eight sapphires, garnished with thirty two small diamonds, thirty two small rubies, and three-score and four [64] pearls fixed, and on each border thirty two small diamonds and thirty two small rubies".

Despite Spilman and Herrick's work on the circlet and the sacrifice of Elizabeth's jewels, it seems to have made little impact on the diplomatic community, as Scaramelli and Giovanni degli Effetti reported that she went to her coronation on Monday 25 July 1603 with a plain band of gold on her head. A list of jewels requested by William Segar from the Jewel House for the coronation mentions "a circle of gold for the Queen to wear when she goeth to her coronation", perhaps indicating that she did not wear the new circlet that King James had ordered. However, Benjamin von Buwinckhausen, a diplomat from the Duchy of Württemberg, described her seated in Westminster Abbey wearing a heavy coronet set with precious stones.

She was crowned with one of Elizabeth's "wearing crowns". The new circlet was added to the Crown Jewels in March 1606, but remained in Anne's keeping. John Spilman's bills for jewels since the coronation had not been fully paid in November 1607, and he asked the Earl of Salisbury for £2,000 to pay his workmen.

=== London goldsmiths and gifts ===
The other goldsmiths who supplied Anne of Denmark in England include; Arnold Lulls, William Herrick, John Spilman, Estienne Sampson, Nicholas Howker, Abraham der Kinderen, and Abraham Harderet who received an annual fee of £50 as the queen's jeweller. In the 1630s Hester Rogers, widow of William Rogers of Southwark and Friday Street (died 1626), claimed that he remained unpaid for jewels worth £2,000 supplied to Henrietta Maria and £1,248 for jewels sold to Anne of Denmark. William Rogers sold rings and jewels to the Earl of Rutland and Katherine Manners in 1619.

In 1603 the Earl of Rutland was sent to Denmark as ambassador to announce the successful Union of the Crowns. He bought four jewels in London for £75 as gifts for the Danish royal family, including a gold pelican set with an opal and wings studded with rubies which cost £9. Arnold Lulls made a jewel for Anne of Denmark intended as a gift for Margaret of Austria, Queen of Spain. Charles Howard, 1st Earl of Nottingham presented this jewel depicting the Habsburg emblems of a diamond double eagle and golden fleece to the Queen of Spain in Madrid in May 1605.

In 1611, Anne of Denmark asked Viscount Lisle and Sir Thomas Lake to write to the Lord Mayor to allow her foreign servant John Lymiers or Le Myre to work as freeman goldsmith in London and join the Goldsmith's company, but this was resisted. Perhaps, as in the cases of Clei, Elias Le Tellier, and Jakob Kroger in Scotland, Anne of Denmark was able to employ Le Myre outside of the usual craft or merchant guild. Anne of Denmark employed a Flemish apothecary, Lewis Lemire, who may have been his relation. Lewis Lemire witnessed transactions involving the queen's diamonds.

John Spilman made a jewel with the "AR" cipher as the queen's gift to the Count of Aremburgh. Nicholas Howker made a chain which Anne of Denmark gave to the Spanish ambassador the Count of Villamediana as his parting gift in February 1606. It comprised gold snakes enamelled green, set with diamonds. Anne of Denmark gave another chain which had 86 elements including 22 green snakes set with small pearls and sparks of ruby to Anne Livingstone.

Anne gave jewels as gifts at christenings. She gave her lawyer Lawrence Hyde and his wife Barbara a diamond ring.

=== Early portraits in England and the Great H of Scotland ===
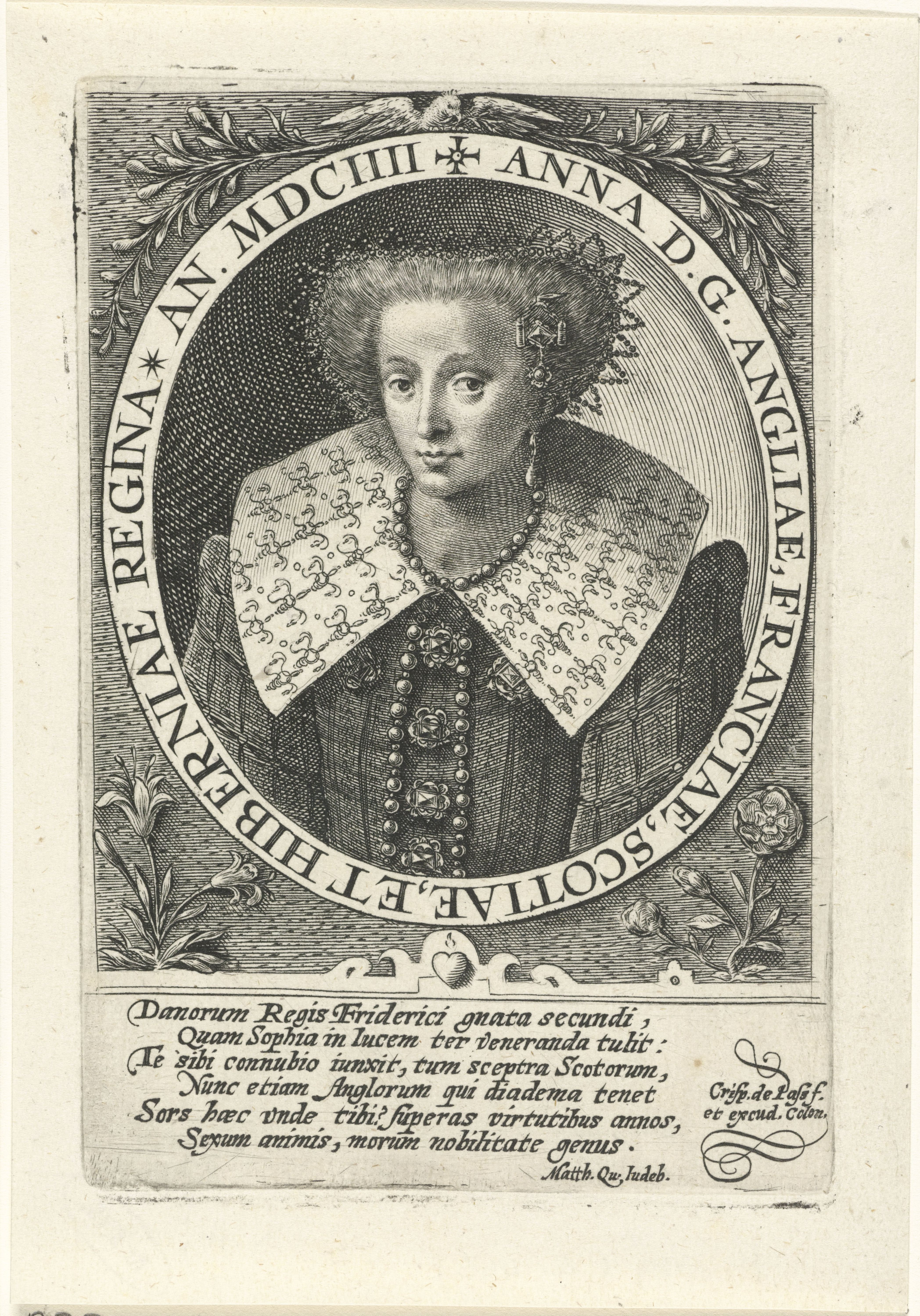
The 1604 engraved portrait of Anne of Denmark by Crispin de Passe

Some painted portraits of Anne of Denmark made at this time show her wearing a jewel including a large diamond and cabochon ruby beneath (like the descriptions of the Scottish Great H or Harry), flanked by four precious stones on both sides, worn as a pendant from a necklace. An engraved portrait by Crispin de Passe dated 1604 includes a similar jewel worn in her hair. These may be representations of Great H before it was remodelled as part of the new Mirror of Great Britain in 1606.

The verses accompanying the 1604 engraved portrait refer to her marriage, and her Scottish and the English coronations:

Te sibi connubio junxit, tum sceptra Scotorum,
Nunc etiam Anglorum qui diadema tenet.

He joined with you in marriage, and in the sceptres of the Scots
Now also you hold the English diadem or crown.

=== Jewels at court ===
Lady Arbella Stuart and the Countess of Shrewsbury worried about what to get Anne of Denmark as New Year's Day gifts for January 1604. She asked a gentlewoman and the chamberer, Margaret Hartsyde for advice and was told the queen regarded "not the value but the device", and rather than a gown or petticoat, she would prefer a "little bunch of rubies to hang in her ear". In January 1604, a jewel was featured in The Masque of Indian and China Knights at Hampton Court. It was sold to King James by Peter Vanlore, and was perhaps a diamond jewel with a pendant pearl costing £760. At this time, Vanlore sold to James another jewel comprising a large table ruby and two lozenge diamonds, for which he received in part exchange a parcel of Queen Elizabeth's jewels. The parcel included pieces that had been in the keeping of another of Elizabeth's ladies in waiting, the late Catherine Howard, Countess of Nottingham, a combined looking glass and clock with the figure of woman on a pillar wearing a table diamond on her forepart, and items taken from a ship regarded as a prize at sea. The parcel was valued at £5492-11s-2d and Vanlore received a further payment of £11,477 in February. Dudley Carleton heard the jewel in the masque cost James £40,000, more than twice this sum, and presumably an exaggeration.

Dudley Carleton described Anne's costume as Pallas in the masque The Vision of the Twelve Goddesses (8 January 1604). He was surprised to see her legs below the knee, "she had a pair of buskins sett with rich stones, a helmett full of jewells, and her whole attire [helmet] embossed with jewells of severall fashions".

In January 1604 an inventory was made of other jewels from Elizabeth's collection still in the keeping of Earl of Nottingham including brooches fashioned like winding serpents set with emeralds. A selection was made of a number of Elizabeth's jewels listed in the Stowe inventory (British Library Stowe 557) on 30 January 1604, presumably for sale or exchange.

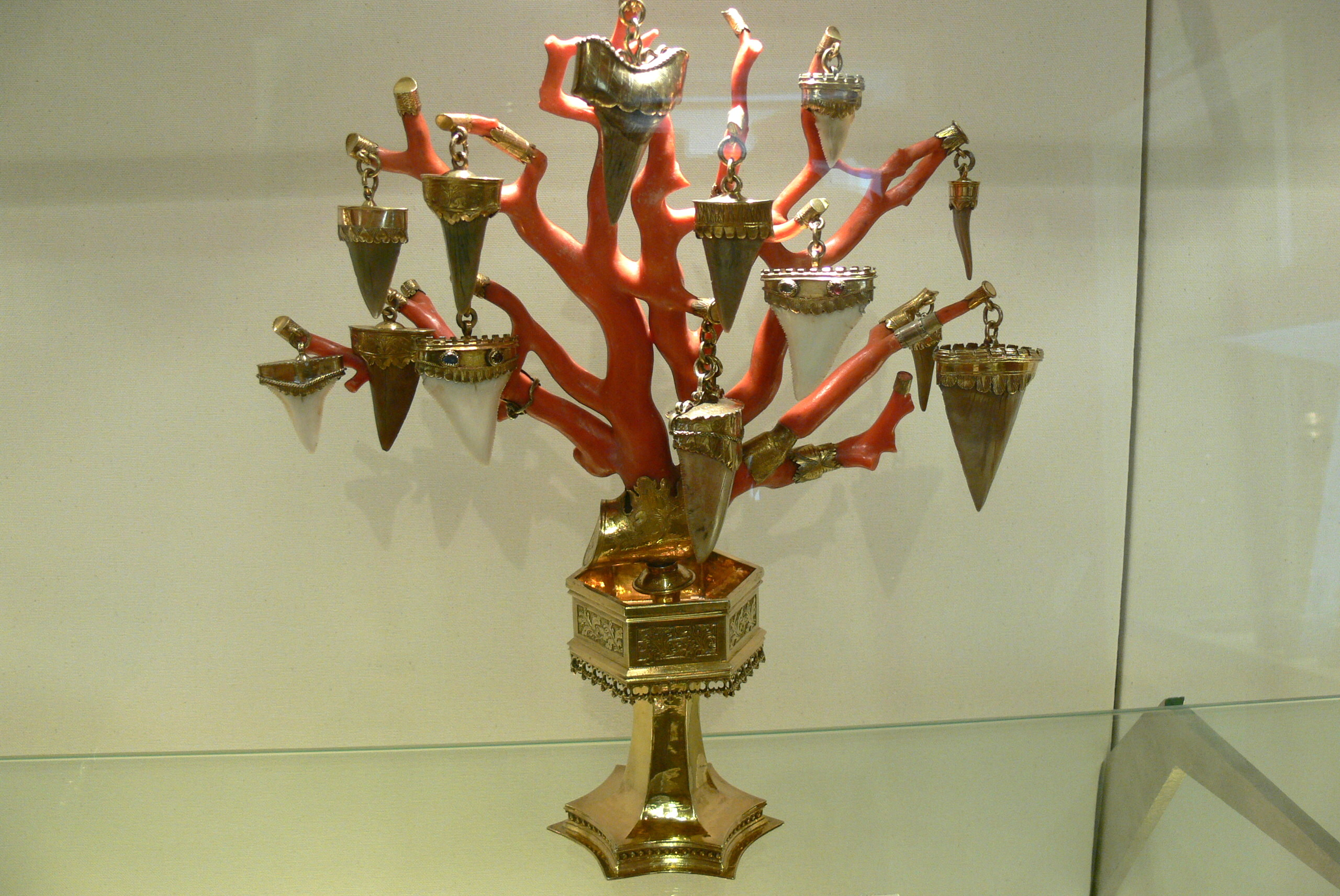
A 15th or 16th-century coral branch with "serpent's tongues" intended to test for poison, (Vienna, Treasury of the German Order)

Auditor Gofton made a list of 29 jewels formerly in the Jewel House at the Tower of London which King James had given to Anne of Denmark on various occasions. He was rewarded with £20 in November 1614 for his work making inventories of jewels at the Tower over a decade.

In December 1607 King James retrieved some pieces from the Jewel House and sent them to the goldsmiths William Herrick and John Spilman for refurbishment. He gave four pieces to Anne of Denmark; a cup made of unicorn's horn with a gold cover (believed to guard against poison) set with diamonds and pearls, a gold jug or ewer, a salt with a branch set with sapphires and serpent's tongues (really fossilized shark teeth, also a safeguard against poisoning), and a crystal chess board with topaz and crystal pieces.

The Masque of Beauty, performed in January 1608, was noted for the brilliant display of jewels. John Chamberlain mentioned that a lady of lesser rank than a baroness wore jewels valued more than £100,000, and that Arbella Stuart and Anne of Denmark's jewels were worth as much and more. Anne wore a collar or necklace with the initials "P" and "M" that had belonged to Mary I of England. The necklace may have symbolised her preference for Prince Henry to marry a Spanish bride.

=== Collars of knots of precious stones ===
Anne of Denmark kept a chain or collar made up of three sorts of knots of diamonds, with a pendant like a gold key set with diamonds. This had been given to Elizabeth by the Earl of Leicester in 1584. Anne gave it to her daughter Elizabeth, and she wears it in a portrait by Meirevelt now at the museum of Châlons-sur-Saône. Elizabeth of Bohemia pawned the chain in the 1650s and her son Charles Louis redeemed it. Another collar was made up of letters in "Spanish work", spelling out a Latin motto Gemma preciosior intus - a greater jewel within. At the centre were the Greek letters alpha and omega. This had been Thomas Heneage's gift to Elizabeth in 1589. Anne had it lengthened by John Spilman in July 1610, adding the components of another Spanish work collar. Then in April 1611 Anne ordered Spilman and Nicasius Russell to dismantle parts of it for jewels to adorn table salts and a gold bowl. James may have given the remaining collar to the Duchess of Lennox as a New Year's Day gift in 1622. One of Anne's collars given to the Countess by King James was described in 1639 as a collar of red and white roses of diamonds and rubies, known as the collar of Lancaster and York..

== Ambassadors and jewels ==
In 1603, the French ambassador the Marquis de Rosny arranged for his resident colleague Christophe de Harlay, Count of Beaumont to buy and give jewels to prominent courtiers. Anne got a crystal mirror, the Countess of Bedford a gold watch set with diamonds. The Venetian ambassador Nicolò Molin was granted an English coat of arms featuring the wheel of a watermill, punning on his name. He gave Anne of Denmark a gold ring with an aquamarine with the motto "Una gota de aqui de molyne", meaning a drop of water from the mill.

Wiliam Herrick and Arnold Lulls were paid in October 1606 for pearls given by King James to Anne, and for "two pictures of gold set with stone" which she gave to the French ambassador Christophe de Harlay, Count of Beaumont, and his wife Anne Rabot. Ambassadors had regular audiences with Anne of Denmark, and their wives also came to see the queen. John Finet described a visit of Isabelle Brûlart, the wife of French ambassador Gaspard Dauvet, Sieur des Marets, at Denmark House in December 1617, although no gifts are mentioned.

Anne and her ladies-in-waiting received gifts from ambassadors. In 1603, the French ambassadors, the Marquis de Rosny and Christophe de Harlay, Count of Beaumont, gave her a mirror of Venice crystal in a gold box set with diamonds, and a gold table clock with diamonds to Lucy Russell, Countess of Bedford, a gold box with the French king's portrait to Lady Rich and a pearl and diamond necklace to "Lady Rosmont". Rosny also gave a diamond ring to "Margaret Aisan, a favourite lady of the queen's bedchamber", this was Margaret Hartsyde, a Scottish servant who lacked the aristocratic status of the other women.

=== Corvine stone ===
John Florio, an Italian writer who was a groom in Anne's household, bequeathed a "corvine" or "corvina" stone to William Herbert, 3rd Earl of Pembroke. He said the stone had been a gift to Anne of Denmark from Ferdinando I de' Medici. Said to originate in the head of the raven, the stone was a talisman with medicinal and prophetic properties and this example was supplied in a box with instructions and information in English and Italian. It had been one of the gifts made when there was discussion of Henry Frederick, Prince of Wales marrying his daughter Caterina de' Medici, and may have been brought to England by the Duke's envoy Ottaviano Lotti in 1611. Lotti asked Florio to help him buy hunting dogs as a gift for Anne of Denmark, keeping the present a secret from Jane Drummond, one of Anne of Denmark's gentlewomen.

=== Spanish embassy of 1604 ===
Juan Fernández de Velasco, Constable of Castile, commissioned jewels in Antwerp as gifts to distribute at the English court in 1604. Against the current custom he tried to buy on a sale-or-return basis and was flatly refused.

Details of the embassy were published in the Relación de la Jornada de Condestable del Castilla en Londres 1604. At the Constable of Castile's first audience with Anne of Denmark, she sat under a canopy embroidered with rubies, emeralds, and hyacinths. At a banquet in London to celebrate the treaty of 1604, the Constable of Castile, or Villamediana, drank a toast from a cup of crystal and gold shaped like a dragon, which was then displayed on the queen's cupboard. The dragon cup reflected a quartering of the Oldenburg heraldry.

The Venetian ambassador noted that the Constable gave gifts of jewels on his departure, including jewels worth 12,000 crowns to Anne of Denmark and presents to her gentlewomen including Jane Drummond. He gave jewels to prominent figures in Anna's houseshold likely to promote the Catholic cause, Lady Anna Hay received a gold anchor studded with 39 diamonds, and Jane Drummond an aigrette studded with 75 diamonds, both pieces supplied by a Brussels jeweller Jean Guiset. Anne of Denmark sent her chamberlain, Robert Sidney, to the Constable with a diamond–set locket contained her portrait and James's and a stomacher or necklace, a garganta, embroidered with large valuable pearls for his wife, the Duchess of Frías. The piece was identified as a pearl necklace in the family collection and sold in the 19th century.

=== Diplomatic giving ===
King James and Anne sent a variety of gifts to Brussels in 1605, including deer, dogs, horses and caparisons, and Anne sent the Infanta Isabella Clara Eugenia embroidered waistcoats and pillow-cases, which she politely declared were finer than any Spanish needlework. After the Gunpowder Plot, the Queen of Spain sent an embassy to congratulate the royal family on their safe deliverance, bringing Anne a Spanish-style satin robe embellished with gilt leather, with 48 long gold tags or aglets (at 3 inches, longer than those used in England), with chains and necklaces of gold beads all filled with scented ambergris. Scent was a feature of Spanish diplomacy, Villamediana brought a perfumer in 1603.

In January 1604 Marie de' Medici, Queen of France sent Anne of Denmark a cabinet inset with panels scented with musk and ambergris to make a "sweet savour". The drawers were full of flowers for setting in head attires and other jewels. A similar item was listed in 1619 at Denmark House, a "cabinet of pomander" containing a "curious suite of pomander" in a store room next to the little bedchamber. William Bruce, a diplomatic agent based in Poland, sent portrait miniatures of King James to Anna, enchased in yellow baltic amber.

Anne of Denmark was very much involved in the entertainment of the Prince de Joinville in May and June 1607. He gave her a pearl for an earring said to worth 3000 Écu. In May 1613, Anne went to Bath to take the waters for her health. The ambassador of Savoy started to follow her bringing a gift of a crystal casket mounted with silver gilt, but gave up and returned to London. He had brought lions and other live beasts for King James.

=== Descriptions of the queen and her jewels ===
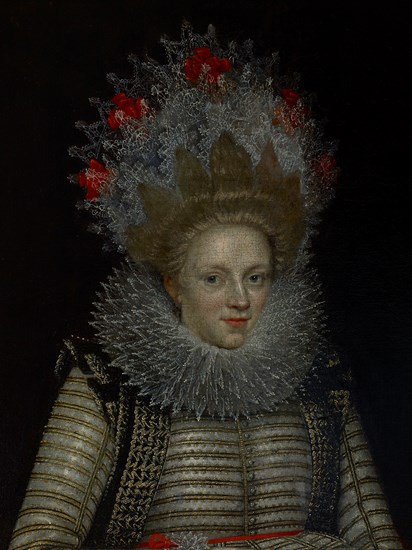
Playwright Elizabeth Cary wears her hair in petals, a style worn by Anne of Denmark in 1617, MFAH

Ambassadors frequently described Anne of Denmark's magnificent appearance. The Venetian diplomats Piero Duodo and Nicolo Molin had an audience with Anne of Denmark at Wilton House in November 1603, she was seated under a canopy, covered with jewels and strings of pearls. The Constable of Castille saw Anne of Denmark at Whitehall Palace on 25 August 1604. She was sitting on a throne with a canopy or cloth of estate decorated with rubies, emeralds, and hyacinths watching dancing. On 28 August he had his formal audience with the queen who was attended by twenty beautiful Maids of Honour.

The Venetian ambassador Zorzi Giustinian wrote that the queen and her ladies' pearls and jewels were a highlight of The Masque of Beauty. Giustinian thought such an abundant and splendid display could not be rivalled by another royal court. Antonio Foscarini admired her pearls at the wedding of Princess Elizabeth in 1613, she wore "in her hair a number of pear-shaped pearls, the most beautiful in the world". She wore diamonds all over her white satin costume so that she appeared ablaze. The jewels were thought to be worth £400,000.

In December 1617 Orazio Busino, the chaplain of Piero Contarini, described Anne of Denmark at Somerset House. She was seated under a canopy of gold brocade. Her costume was pink and gold, low cut at the front in an oval shape, and her farthingale was four feet wide. Her hair was dressed with diamonds and other jewels and extended in rays, or like the petals of a sunflower, with artificial hair.

Ben Jonson mentioned jewels worn by nine female performers on 14 January 1608 at the "Throne of Beauty" in his account of The Masque of Beauty, "the habit and dressing for the fashion was most curious, and so exceeding riches, that the throne whereon they sat seemed to be a mine of light, struck from their jewels and their garments". Anne wore a collar of diamonds and ciphers of "P" and "M" which had belonged to Mary I of England. Busino gave a description of the jewels and costume of aristocrats and ladies in waiting in the audience at the masque on 6 January 1617, Jonson's The Vision of Delight;

every box was filled notably with most noble and richly arrayed ladies, in number some 600 and more according to the general estimate; the dresses being of such variety in cut and colour as to be indescribable; the most delicate plumes over their heads, springing from their foreheads or in their hands serving as fans; strings of jewels on their necks and bosoms and in their girdles and apparel in such quantity that they looked like so many queens, so that at the beginning, with but little light, such as that of the dawn or of the evening twilight, the splendour of their diamonds and other jewels was so brilliant that they looked like so many stars ... The dress peculiar to these ladies is very handsome ... behind it hangs wellnigh from the neck down to the ground, with long, close sleeves and waist ... The farthingale also plays its part. The plump and buxom display their bosoms very liberally, and those who are lean go muffled up to the throat. All wear men's shoes or at least very low slippers. They consider the mask as indispensable for their face as bread at table, but they lay it aside willingly at these public entertainments".

The audience on that night included Lady Anne Clifford, Lady Ruthin, the Countess of Pembroke, the Countess of Arundel, Pocahontas and Tomocomo. Costume worn at court was expensive, in December 1617 Anne Clifford gave Anne of Denmark a satin skirt with £100 worth of embroidery.

In portraits, Anne of Denmark and her contemporaries are seen to wear jewels suspended from the ear by shoelaces, or black cords. As a male fashion, this use of laces was mocked by the poet Samuel Rowlands in 1609. Rowlands suggests that a "lowly minded youth" would crave the "shoe-string" of a courtesan to wear as a favour for his ear.

=== Decorative arts: table fountains, salts, and clocks ===
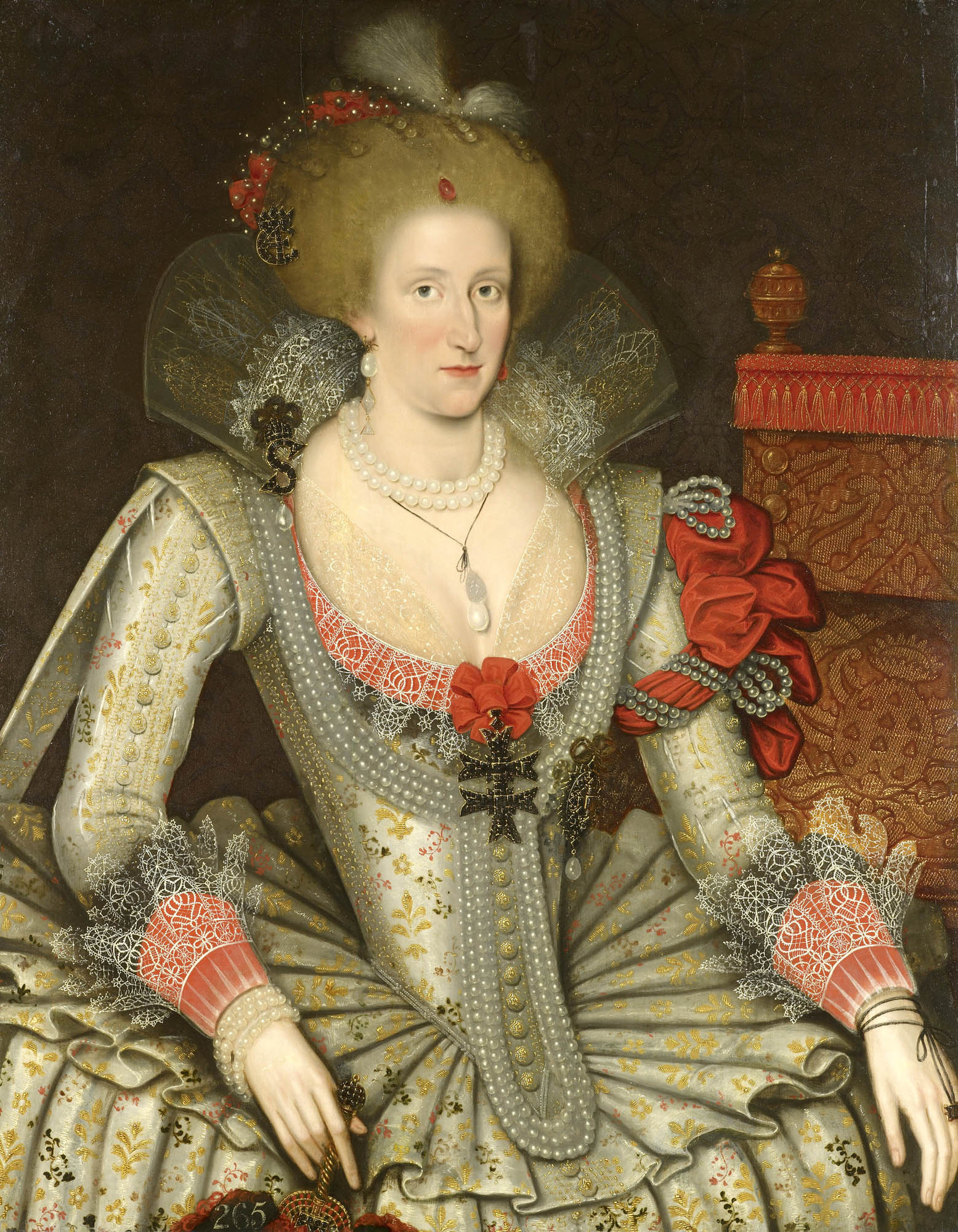
In this portrait by Marcus Gheeraerts, Anne of Denmark wears a double cross set with diamonds. A double cross and a double cross of the Order of Jerusalem were listed in her inventory. The crowned "s fermé" or "fermesse" at the collar was a symbol used in correspondence as a mark of affection, and was also the initial of Anne's mother, Sophie of Mecklenburg

The Welsh-born goldsmith John Williams supplied a "fountain of silver gilt, well chased, containing one basin with two tops, one of them being three satyres or wild men, the other a woman with a sail or flag". The fountain had three taps or cocks decorated with mermaids. It was used at Somerset House, known in her time as "Denmark House". The wild men were heraldic supporters of the Danish royal arms. A table fountain formerly thought to have belonged to Anne's sister-in-law Anna Kathrine (1575-1612), wife of Christian IV, but now known to date from 1648, survives at Rosenborg Castle. It features the story of Actaeon and Diana and was designed to dispense distilled and perfumed waters.

At Denmark House, she had a green enamelled palm tree with a crown and a Latin epigram in gilt letters on the queen's fruitfulness as matriarch of the Stuart succession, composed by her secretary, the poet William Fowler, and based on his anagram of her name; "Anna Brittanorum Regina" - "In anna regnantium arbor". The anagram was printed in Henry Peacham's Minerva Brittana (London, 1612), attributed to Fowler, with an image of an olive tree bearing the initials of her three children, Henry, Charles, and Elizabeth. The verse on the tree was:

Perpetuo vernans arbor regnantium in Anna,
Fert fructum et frondes, germine laeta vivo.
Anna's ever flourishing tree,
Bearing fruit and leaves, her happy life continues.

William Fowler's own translation, surviving in his manuscripts at the National Library of Scotland, was:

Freshe budding blooming trie,
from ANNA faire which springs,
Growe on blist birth with leaves and fruit,
from branche to branche in kings.

Sir Robert Cecil had referred to Anne of Denmark's children as "your royall branches" in May 1603. The figurative image of Anne of Denmark as a fruitful vine, an olive tree with four branches, was used in a speech made in Parliament after the Gunpowder Plot by Thomas Egerton, 1st Viscount Brackley as Lord Chancellor. Fowler's manuscripts include notes for other mottoes probably to decorate the frames of portraits or other objects.

The palm tree was admired and described by John Ernest I, Duke of Saxe-Weimar who visited London in 1613. The object seems to have been a salt combined with a clock, described in 1620 with other items of the queen's tableware scheduled for sale as; " a salt of gold in pieces, having a clock within crystal, the foot of same being gold triangle wise, the cover thereof being a castle, and out of the same castle a green tree, the flowers being diamonds and rubies in roses, the same clock salt and crystal garnished with gold, diamonds, and rubies, wanting a dial in the same clock".

Another unusual clock at Denmark House was made in the form of a tortoise of silver-gilt, with 16 flat pearls and 11 smaller pearls forming the shell, with emeralds on the head, neck, and tail, and a clock mounted in its body. When Anne of Denmark was pregnant with her daughter Mary she moved in January 1605 for her confinement or lying-in to special lodgings at Greenwich Palace. A magnificent cupboard of gilt plate was provided for her Privy Chamber. She kept one piece for later use, a "jug of crystal garnished with silver gilt, with a phoenix in the top in a crown, the handle like a horse's head". Following the birth of Princess Mary, King James gave her a diamond jewel and two dozen buttons worth £1550, provided by Arnold Lulls and Philip Jacobson. In February 1612 Christian IV sent her a mirror framed in gold, sprinkled with diamonds, pearls and jewels.

In 1625 some jewels and plate were sent to the Duke of Buckingham in the United Provinces, destined to sold or pawned, including some items of Anne's, a gold basin and ewer set with diamonds, a jewel-set bowl with a cover topped with the figure of a wild Man holding a ruby, and a standing cup set with jewels and engraved with the arms of Denmark.

== The inventory of 1606 ==
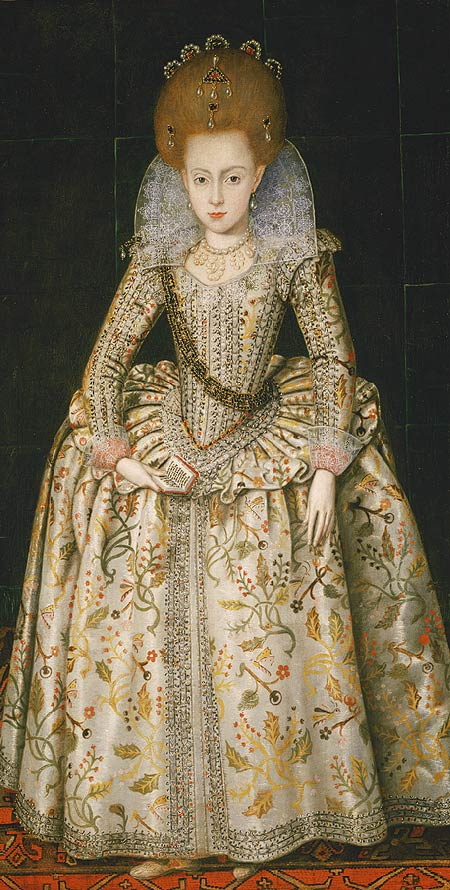
Princess Elizabeth, aged about 10 years old, wearing a wire framed attire, by Robert Peake the Elder

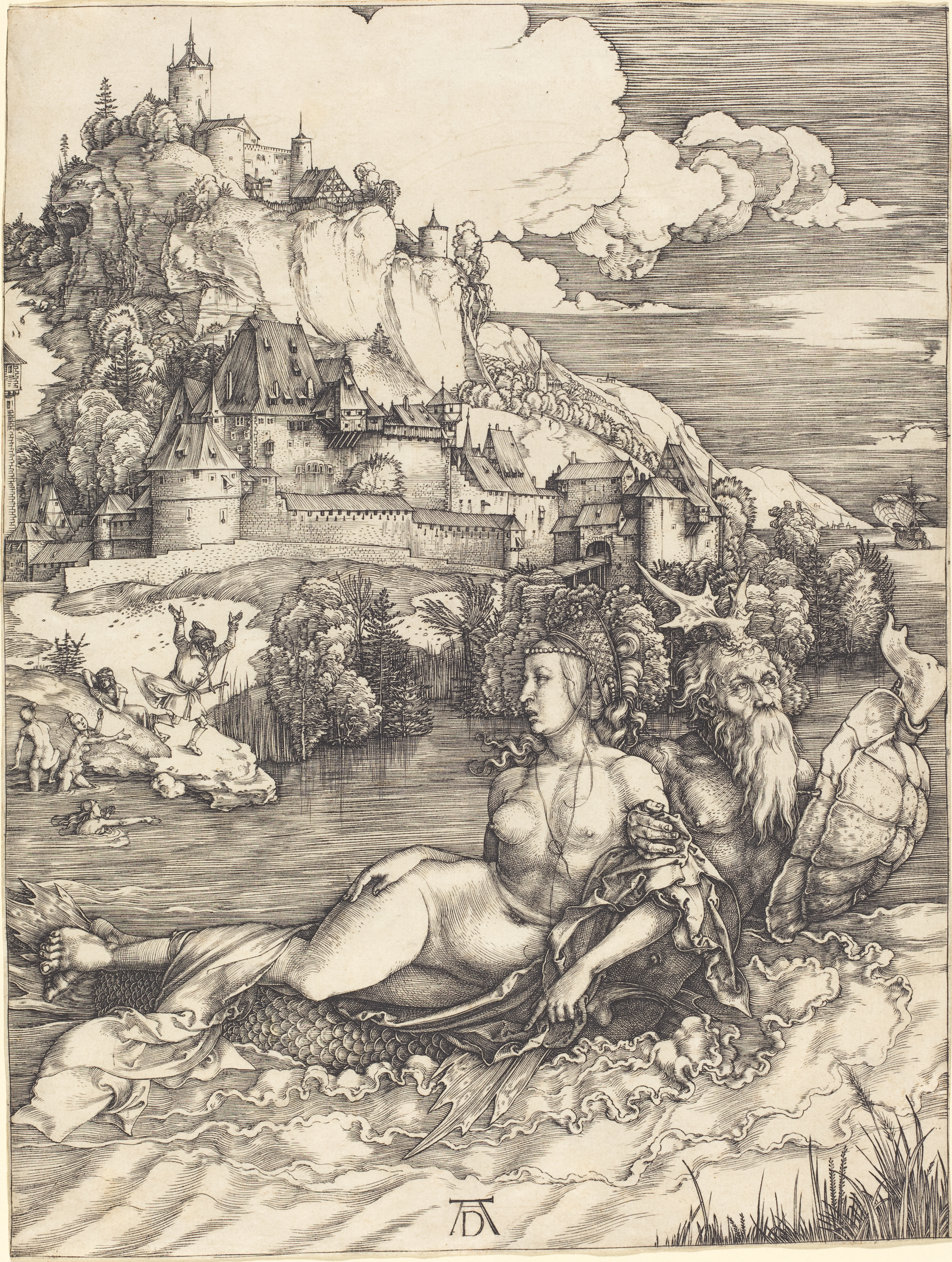
Anne of Denmark's gold monster with a woman on his back may have been inspired by images like a print by Albrecht Dürer

The inventory is held by the National Library of Scotland and includes over 400 items, including pieces inherited from Queen Elizabeth, and gifts from King James and Christian IV. It is not clear if any of the jewels had belonged to Mary, Queen of Scots. The inventory lists the jewels as they were kept, in numbered chests with individual index letters. Contemporary notes added to the inventory record that many pieces were broken up to provide gems to set in tableware. Such pieces were often given to ambassadors as gifts. A necklace of knots of pearls, some set with rubies, was given to the queen's daughter Princess Mary. After the child's death it was given to her nurse.

A "feather" jewel with seven spriggs was deprecated because its stones were topazes set in imitation of diamonds and its pearls, though "fair and round", were Scottish. A note in the inventory shows that when it was dismantled for its gold the topazes were kept back to show the queen. Diamonds were taken from three bracelets when Anne wanted them for new aglet tags. She changed her mind and the diamonds were kept (for a time) in a chest with other loose stones and pearls.

=== Attires ===
An "attire" for the queen's hair was described in detail; "An Attire for the heade made of wire with hair colour silk, having eleven spiggs, upon every sprigg a great pear Pearl fastened with silver wire, the middle pearl being the greatest, the gold not going through it, in weight __ 2oz 3dwt 21grs." This was probably the pearl pearl head dress which Anne wore at the Wedding of Princess Elizabeth and Frederick V of the Palatinate on 14 February 1613.

A portrait medal struck in gold and silver, thought to commemorate her English coronation, represents her jewelled hairstyle in England. Some attires were supplied by tire-makers, shortly before leaving Scotland Anne appointed John Taylor as her tire-maker. Her young companion, Anne Livingstone, recorded the purchase of an attire in similar fashion for herself in 1604, "ane wyer to my haed with nyne pykis" (9 peaks), with a "perewyk of hair to cover the wyr". Livingstone was a member of the household of Princess Elizabeth, whose portraits show these wire framed attires. Anne of Denmark's inventory records gifts of jewels to Livingstone when she left the court and returned to Scotland to marry Sir Alexander Seton of Foulstruther, who was made Earl of Eglinton.

=== A ship under sail ===
There was a gold "ship under sail" on a diamond sea with a Latin motto Sponte – willingly. This jewel may have commemorated her voyage from Denmark. Like other jewels it was dismantled by John Spilman to make a table salt. Another "shippe of gold under saile" had three figures aboard and another in the main top or crow's nest. Its motto was Amor et gratio cum verbo – love and grace with the word. This ship was recycled into plate by Nicasius Russell. The inventory includes a third smaller ship. Ship jewels may have represented good fortune. Others appear in lists of jewels belonging to Catherine Howard and Catherine Parr.

=== Portraits and the jewels in the inventory ===
A portrait of Anne of Denmark by Paul van Somer in the National Portrait Gallery, London shows a central jewel in the queen's hair possibly attached to the red ribbon-covered wire of the attire, or more likely pinned in the hair with a bodkin. It comprises a large table-cut diamond with a tuft of feathers, with a pear pearl and a ruby drop beneath. This may be the jewel called the "Portugal diamond" or the "Mirror of France". The "Mirror of Portugal" was acquired by Queen Elizabeth from António, Prior of Crato and re-used by Anne of Denmark with the "Cobham pearl". King James wore the Portugal diamond on his hat on 27 May 1603. The ruby may be the one listed in Elizabeth's 1587 inventory, "to be worne on the forehead".

=== The Portugal diamond ===
Anne's 1606 inventory includes, "A faire and great table Diamond being the Diamond of Portingale, set in a plaine thinne Collet of gold, with a very small carnation silk Lace [and] pearl pendant". The inventory notes that John Spilman added a gold bodkin shank or stalk. The Portugal diamond and the Cobham pearl were recorded later in the seventeenth century by drawings made by Thomas Cletcher, a jeweller of The Hague. Cletcher drew jewels belonging to Henrietta Maria during her exile. His album is held by the Museum Boijmans Van Beuningen.

=== The Annunciation and Actaeon ===
Jewels with an Annunciation scene and Diana with three nymphs and Actaeon, probably elements from the lockets given to Anne at baptism of Prince Henry in 1594, were listed together in 1606. The Annunciation was given to Anne Livingstone. Diana and Actaeon was scrapped by Nicasius Russell to make a basin and ewer in 1609.

=== Sea monster ===
A jewel in the inventory, dismantled for its diamonds and gold in 1610, depicted a woman on the back of a monster "half a man and half a dragons taile". It was suspended by three chains from a gold knop. The piece may have been inspired by images such as Albrecht Dürer's enigmatic sea monster.

== A ruby from the Mirror of Great Britain ==
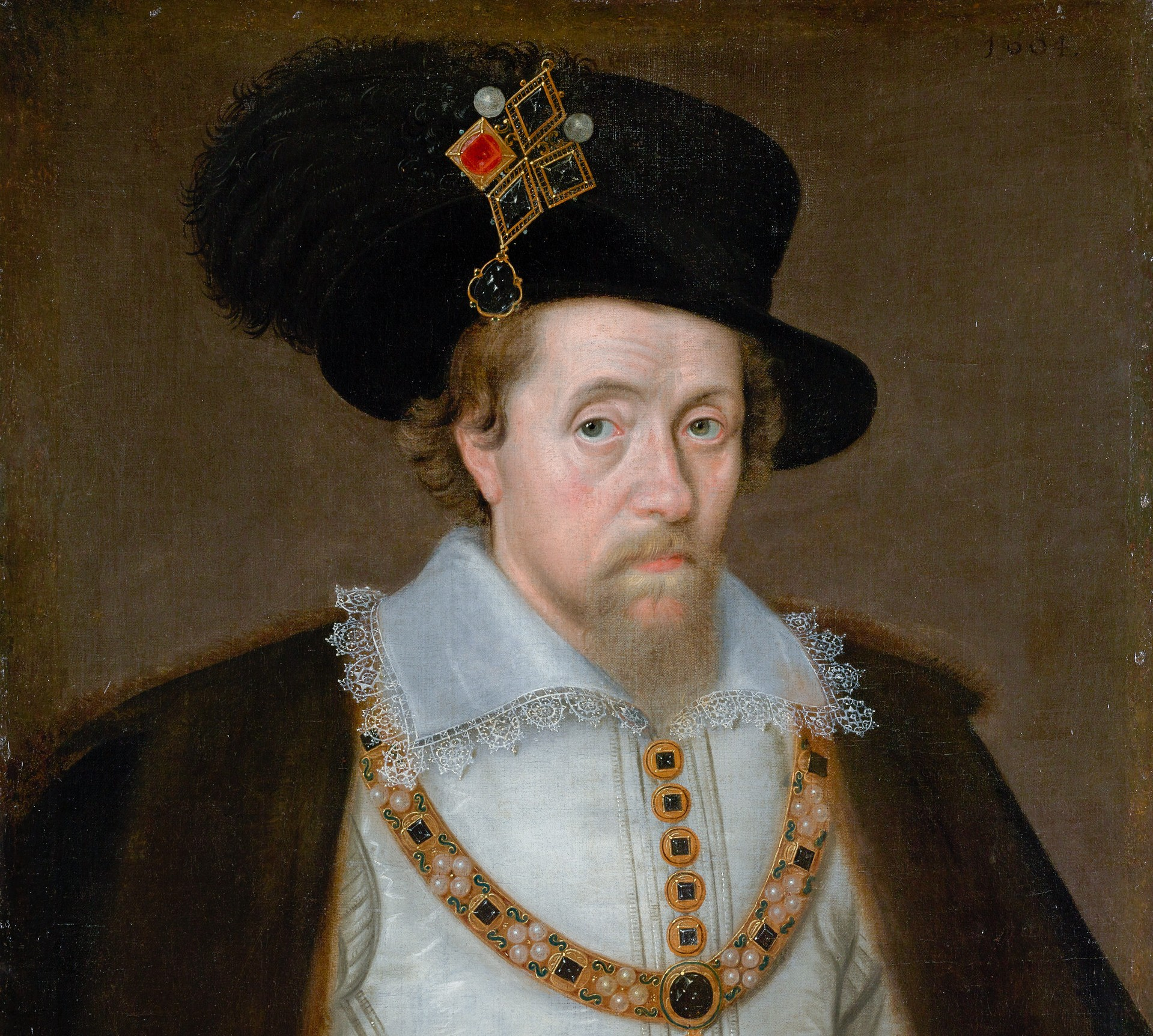
James VI and I gave Anne of Denmark the ruby from the hat badge he called the 'Mirror of Great Britain'

King James ordered the creation of a jewel called the "Mirror of Great Britain", apparently to commemorate the Union of the Crowns of 1603. He gave Anne of Denmark the ruby from the Mirror jewel as a New Year's Day gift in January 1608, set in an aigrette with twenty eight small diamonds. The ruby in the Mirror may have been replaced by a diamond to make the Mirror of Great Britain into a symmetric jewel, like the hat badge of King James later drawn by Thomas Cletscher.

The Venetian ambassadors Francesco Contarini and Marc' Antonio Correr noted King James wearing a hat badge with "five diamonds of extraordinary size" at dinner in February 1610, perhaps the Mirror of Great Britain in this alternative configuration. The Mirror's pendant diamond was the famous Sancy. The Mirror of Great Britain without the ruby was described in two inventories made in 1625.

Anne's collection furnished a gem for one of the King's hat badges. Anne's inventory mentions that a lozenge diamond was taken from an old jewel to be used at the top of a hat badge belonging to King James that was shaped as an initial "I". John Spilman and William Herrick made "a jewel in fashion like an I" for James in 1604 which included two balas rubies and a great and a small diamond.

== Jewels, drawings, and Arthur Bodren ==
A note in the inventory mentions that Anne of Denmark came to the Jewel House herself on 21 July 1610 to select jewels. A letter dated 23 October 1618 gives an insight into the commissioning of jewels and the re-use of old pieces. It was sent by an unknown courtier to Arthur Bodren, a French servant and page of the bedchamber to Anne of Denmark who kept accounts. Bodren was briefly a member of the household of Anne's daughter Princess Mary. He gave money to Inigo Jones for the queen's building works at Greenwich and Oatlands. George Heriot delivered "little things" for the queen to "Arthur Bodrane" of the bedchamber.

The writer had received a message and a "pattern", a drawing, made by the goldsmith "Mr Halle" for a new jewel. He went to the royal Jewel House to find suitable jewels and rubies to use in the new piece. An old diamond bracelet had the right size stones, but Nicasius Russell had already taken any suitable rubies to set in gold plate for the table. He found a "border", with larger diamonds to send to the queen for approval. Mr Halle told him that would please the queen, who "did mislike of the greater diamonds in his pattern in regard they were too little".

Notes written in the 1606 inventory next to an entry for a diamond "girdle or border" and a bracelet identify these as the pieces selected for Bodren to send to Anne of Denmark at Hampton Court in 1618. Arthur Bodren went on to serve Henrietta Maria. He died in 1632 and left legacies to several members of her household including 20 shillings each to Jeffrey Hudson and Little Sara. Contemporary drawings of jewels by a London goldsmith Arnold Lulls survive in the Victoria and Albert Museum.

Anne of Denmark pawned some of her most valuable diamonds in March 1615 for £3,000. The goldsmith John Spilman made record drawings of the cut of eleven stones and indicated the settings of two. He noted them as eight table diamonds set in gold enamelled black, one diamond resembling a glass window quarry, and two lozenge diamonds cut in facets.

== Disposal of a royal collection ==
In her lifetime, Anne gave jewels to her friends and supporters. Jewels and lockets that were gifts from Anne of Denmark are mentioned in wills and inventories. In 1640 the Laird of Glenorchy at Balloch Castle had a "round jewell of gold sett with precious stanes conteining twentie nyne diamonds and four great rubbies, quhilk [which] Queene Anna of worthie memorie Queene of Great Britane France and Irland gave to umquhill [the late] Sir Duncane Campbell of Glenurquhy. Item ane gold ring sett with ane great diamond schapine [shaped] lyke a heart and four uther small diamonds, quhilk the said Queene Anna of worthie memorie gave to the said Sir Duncane". Anne of Denmark sent the "round jewel" to the Laird of Glenorchy in 1607 to wear in his hat.

She did not leave a will bequeathing her jewels. In the years before her death, Prince Charles asked her to make her will, leaving her jewels to him, which did not please King James at all. The lawyer Edward Coke made a note at Denmark House on 19 January 1619 that she wished her "rich stuff, jewels, and plate" to be annexed to the crown, added to the Crown Jewels.

An inventory of her jewels and plate was made after her death by Sir Lionel Cranfield on 19 April 1619. Anne had played the virginals, and the case of one instrument at Denmark House was made of green velvet embroidered with pearls. Soon after the inventory was made, the queen's French page Piero Hugon and the "Dutch maid Anna" were taken to the Tower of London accused of stealing jewels. George Heriot produced "models" or drawings of missing jewels which he had supplied to the queen, said to be worth £63,000.

King James decided to sell around £20,000 worth of the jewels to help fund his progress in the summer of 1619. The goldsmith and financier Peter Vanlore advanced £18,000 on some of the jewels. The best pearls and other rare jewels including a carcanet collar of round and long pearls were retained. James directed his officers to sell some minor items from Anne's collection and wardrobe in July 1619, including fabrics and gowns that had belonged to former queens. Some "jewels, precious stones, plate, and ornaments" had already been sold. The next sales were to include "loose and ragged pearls, some parcels of silver plate, together with broken and ends of silver, linen which hath been much worn, cabinets, remnants of stuff of all sorts, old robes and garments of former queens of this realm". Anne's collection had included some of the clothes of Henry VIII.

King James asked Lionel Cranfield to bring a selection of jewels to him from the Tower of London in March 1623, including the queen's fine pendant diamonds, and jewels "fittest for the wearing of women". In 1623 these and others jewels were sent to Spain during the Spanish Match, some with Francis Stewart including the "Portugal diamond". An inventory was made in May 1625 of a chest of her remaining jewels, including the circlet, the crown used at her Scottish coronation in 1590, and a head attire with nine great round pearls.

The auditor Francis Gofton made an inventory of jewels at the Tower of London in October 1625, with a view to pawning them in the Low Countries to raise money to meet the undertakings of the Treaty of The Hague (1625). Gofton listed the contents of the "Cheste of the late Quene Anne", which included a "rock ruby in fashion of a harte in a collet", an "olde crosse of gold sett with sixe diamonds of an olde cutt, fower table rubies, fower round perles, and a flatt perle pendante", and a gold chain and 60 buttons and 70 "Spanish work" aglets made to hold scented ambergris. This group of jewels was appraised for sale in June 1629 by the goldsmiths James Heriot, Philip Jacobson, Thomas Simpson, and William Tirrey, prior to sale by Francis Cottington, James Maxwell, and George Bingley. Other jewels earmarked for sale at this time included two half pearls from the Mirror of Great Britain.

Jewels including the coronation circlet were acquired and sold in 1630 by James Maxwell, 1st Earl of Dirletoun. Gold plate with her name and arms was pawned with Charles and Peter de Latfeur in Holland in 1635. The crown of the Scottish queens, possibly made for Mary of Guise by John Mosman in 1540, may have been in the Tower of London in 1649, described as a "small crown found in an iron chest, formerly in the Lord Cottington's charge".

Charles I gave Princess Mary a crystal casting bottle set with rubies and diamonds with a chain featuring his mother's "AR" cipher at her marriage to the Prince of Orange on 30 April 1641.

=== Jewel thieves ===
Servants of Anne of Denmark were accused and convicted of stealing her jewels on several occasions, Jacob Kroger in 1594, Margaret Hartsyde in 1608, Piero Hugon and "Dutch maid Anna" in 1619. Dorothy Silken was alleged to have taken gilt plate. "Dutch maid Anna" was probably the favourite domestic servant "Mistress Anna" or Anna Kaas, who was said to have received the queen's valuable linen at her death, despite being "so mean a gentlewoman". "Danish Anna" was with the queen at Hampton Court at her deathbed.

James Howell wrote "Queen Anne left a world of brave jewels behind, but one Piero, an outlandish man, who had the keeping of them embeazl'd many and is run away".

A chest of the queen's jewels discovered at Denmark House in 1621 is mentioned in the royal jewel inventories, and 37 diamonds from these "secret jewels" were used to decorate a miniature of King James sent to Elizabeth of Bohemia. This find is sometimes connected with the theft by Piero Hugon and Danish Anna.
