= Arnold Lulls =

Flemish goldsmith and jeweller

Arnold Lulls (floruit 1580–1625) was a Flemish goldsmith and jeweller in London. He served the court and made several pieces intended as diplomatic gifts.

== Career ==
He was born in Antwerp, and settled in London before 1585, and became a denizen of England in 1618. Lulls was also involved in importing goods with other members of the family, his brothers Peter Lulls of Hamburg and Hans or Jehan Lulls. In 1597 they complained to Sir Robert Cecil about their cargo on the Griffin which was taken by the Earl of Cumberland and Sir Thomas Garrard.

In May 1607 he and several residents in Billingsgate were exempted from paying a tax or subsidy.

In 1604 he provided jewels to the Spanish ambassador, the Count of Villamediana to give to the ladies in waiting of Anne of Denmark. The Countess of Derby, Elizabeth de Vere received a jewel set with diamonds worth about £230 supplied by Lulls. The ambassador bought most of the jewels in Brussels.

Lulls worked as a partner of John Spilman and William Herrick supplying jewels to the royal family. A bill from February 1605 includes, a rope of oriental pearls and a large round pearl for Anne of Denmark, a chain and St George for Prince Henry, a jewel for Prince Charles, two gold lockets with portraits given by Anne of Denmark to the French ambassador Christophe de Harlay, Count of Beaumont and his wife Anne Rabot.

An account for jewels supplied by Lulls and Spilman to the royal family between August 1604 and March 1607 totals £2,772. Another list of jewels supplied by Lulls and Spilman includes items with the monograms "AR" and "JR" with thistles.

Lulls also made a jewel for Anne of Denmark intended as a gift for Margaret of Austria, Queen of Spain. Charles Howard, 1st Earl of Nottingham, gave this jewel depicting Habsburg emblems of a diamond double eagle and golden fleece to her in Madrid in May 1605.

In May 1605 Lulls was paid £1,550 and Philip Jacobson was paid £980 for jewels set with diamonds and two dozen buttons given to Anne of Denmark at the baptism of Princess Mary.

Arnold Lulls and a business partner, Jacques de Beste, a relation of his first wife, were fined in 1619 for exporting gold and silver and his fine was given to Sir James Erskine.

== Family ==
Arnold Lulls married Susanna de Beste (died 1597). Their son, also Arnold Lulls, died in 1618 and left a legacy of £10 to his "cousin", Jane van Lore, daughter of Peter Vanlore. Arnold Lulls's second wife was the mother of Maria or Mary, Margriet, and Sara Lulls.

His daughter Susan or Susannah Lulls (1597–1654) married John Newdigate, a son of the courtier Anne Fitton, in June 1621. The courtier Sir John Tonstal was a witness to the marriage settlement. Tonstal may have made an introduction between the apparently wealthy goldsmith and a gentry family in some financial difficulty. There were difficulties with the payment of the dowry, and a court case, suggesting that Lulls at this time was in financial difficulty himself. A sister, Margreit Lulls, was a visitor at Arbury Hall, the Newdigate family home, in the 1620s. Arnold Lulls wrote to John and Susannah on the death or miscarriage of her second child in 1623.

After the death of John Newdigate, Susannah married Simon Edwards, a London haberdasher and member of the Levant Company, in 1646. Her will includes a bequest to Sara Lulls of her personal jewellery including a pair of earrings each set with five diamonds. Her sister Mary Blackwell was given a treble ruby ring, a gold picture of Elizabeth I, and an amethyst paragon. Mary's husband was Andrew Blackwell, vicar of St Michael's Tilehurst. The name "John Blackwell" is inscribed on the flyleaf of the album of drawings made by Arnold Lulls now held by the Victoria and Albert Museum.

== Lulls album ==
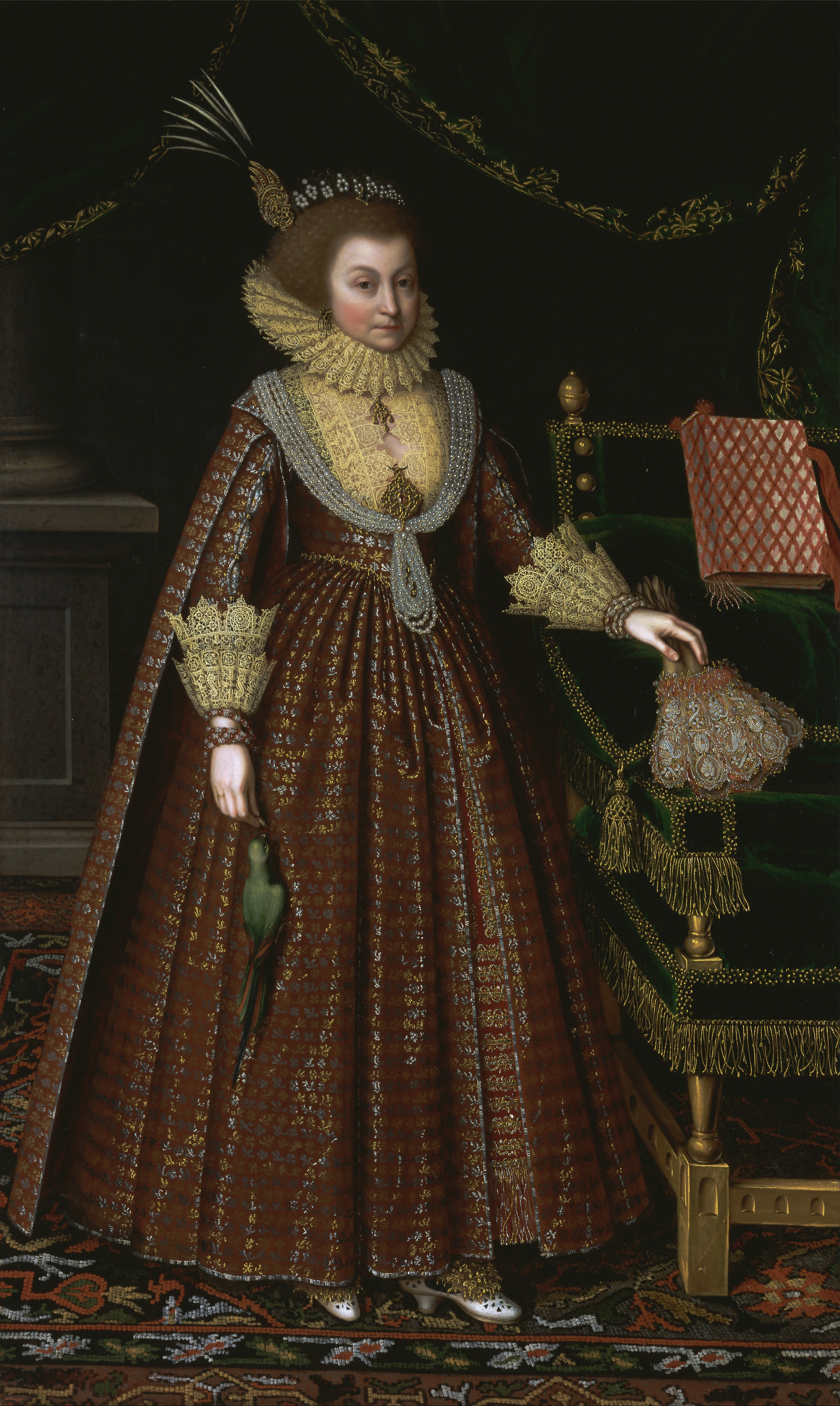
Portrait by Paul van Somer showing a woman, possibly Elizabeth, Countess of Kellie wearing a feather or aigrette

Lulls is associated with an album of 17th-century goldsmith's drawings of jewels, on paper and on vellum, held by the Victoria and Albert Museum (V&A D6 1896). The drawings are by three or four artists. A link to Lulls and his workshop is provided by an inscription in Dutch which says a jewel was an undesirable colour and could not be sold, so it would be returned to "my brother Peter Lulls and company", signed by "AL". The manuscript also includes a royal warrant to Lulls and Herrick from 1605.

Such drawings were made as record drawings for inventories, or for use within a business as the Lulls inscription demonstrates, or when wealthy patrons commissioned jewels. Some of drawings in the Lulls album depict gems at actual size. A letter sent to Arthur Bodren, a page of Anne of Denmark, describes efforts to find diamonds and rubies in the royal Jewel House of the right size to suit a pattern drawn by a Mr Halle. John Spilman made record drawings of the cut and settings of eleven diamonds which Anne of Denmark pawned in March 1615.

- Lulls album, p. 49 with Dutch inscription signed "AL"
- Lulls album, design for a feather or aigrette (or bodkin) with emeralds and rubies
- Lulls album, designs for two feather jewels or aigrettes

Feather jewels were popular in the early 17th-century and frequently appear in portraits. Designs in the Lulls album for aigrettes or feather jewels have been associated with a portrait by Paul van Somer at the Yale Center for British Art, called Elizabeth Pierrepont, Countess of Kellie. (This Countess of Kellie was not the Elizabeth Pierrepont who had served Mary, Queen of Scots). Marie Stewart, Countess of Mar, made efforts to recover a feather jewel set with 49 diamonds which her daughter Catherine Erskine, Countess of Haddington, had pawned.

King James had a feather jewel made up with 26 large diamonds and smaller stones which he wore on his hat. The jewel was depicted in several portraits following a pattern of John de Critz.
