= Nicasius Roussel =

Flemish-English goldsmith

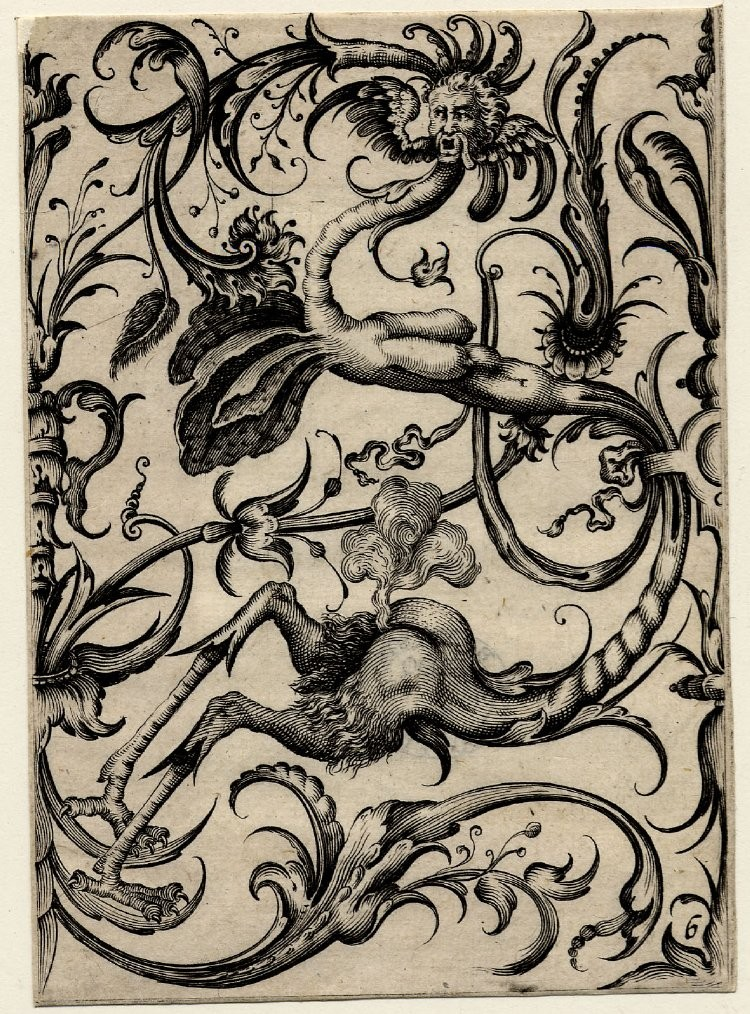
Engaving from De Grotesco, 1644

Nicasius Roussel, Nicasius Rousseel or Nicasius Russell (died 1646) was a Flemish goldsmith, jewelry merchant, draftsman, engraver (printmaker) and court artist who worked in London for James I, Anne of Denmark, and Charles I.

== Life ==
Nicasius Roussel was born in Bruges and came to London in 1567 or 1573. He had family connections with Isaac Oliver and Marcus Gheeraerts the Younger. He became a naturalized citizen of England in April 1608.

He made seven ebony pedestals and portraits of men cast in plaster of paris for Henry Frederick, Prince of Wales.

Nicasius Roussel made 12 gold pieces for a chain with knots set with sparks of diamonds for Anne of Denmark. The chain may have used as a prop in The Masque of Beauty.

He dismantled and melted down jewellery belonging to Anna of Denmark in 1609, 1610, and 1611 to make gold plate and aglets, some set with diamonds, and buttons set with rubies and pearls. One of the old jewels had already lost a diamond in 1603 to a jewel for king's hat made in the shape of the letter "I" by John Spilman and William Herrick. This "I" or "J" was sent to Spain in 1623.

He sold a portrait of a young man by George Pencz to Prince Charles. This painting is still in the Royal Collection.

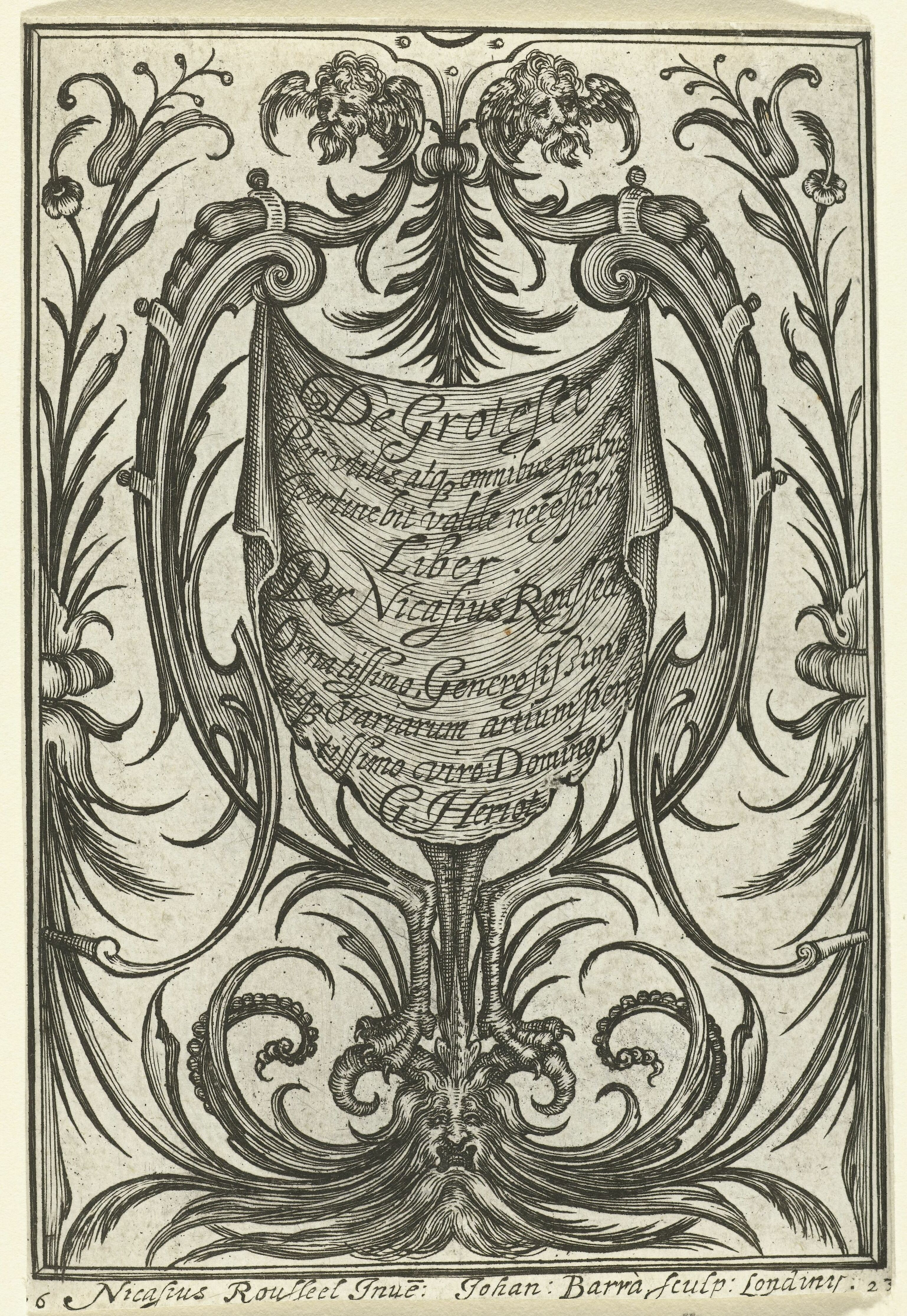
Title page of De Grotesco, 1623

In 1623 a book was published in London under the title De Grotesco. Per utilis atq omnibus quibus pertinebit valde necessari Liber per Nicasius Rousseel ornatissimo, generosissimo atq variarum artium peritissimo viro Domino G Heriot. It contained prints engraved by Johan Barra (or Bara, or Jan Barra) after designs by Roussel and was dedicated to the Scottish goldsmith to the court and philanthropist George Heriot. Each page consists of a frame filled with grotesques composed of human masks and animal and bird monsters attached to plant forms. In 1644 a Dutch language version of 12 of the plates was published in Amsterdam by Claes Jansz. Visscher under the title Seer aerdige / GROTISSEN / dienstich / alle die de Teyckenkonst hanteren / getekent door / Nicasius Rouseel / gedruckt bÿ / CJVisscher. A.o / 1644. This set was subsequently re-issued probably by Nicolaes Visscher II around 1680 and by Joannes de Ram in 1684.

=== Family ===
Nicasius Roussel married Jacomina Wils on 21 April 1590. He remarried after the death of his wife to Clara Johnson in the Dutch church on 27 November 1604. His second wife was reportedly the sister of the painter Cornelius Johnson.

His daughter Elizabeth married John Symcotts of Iseworth. His son Nicasius was a clockmaker. Another son named Theodore (born in 1614) was a painter, who produced copies of portraits by Anthony van Dyck.
