= Philip Jacobson (goldsmith) =

Goldsmith in London, England

Philip Jacobson was a London goldsmith who worked for James VI and I and Anne of Denmark.

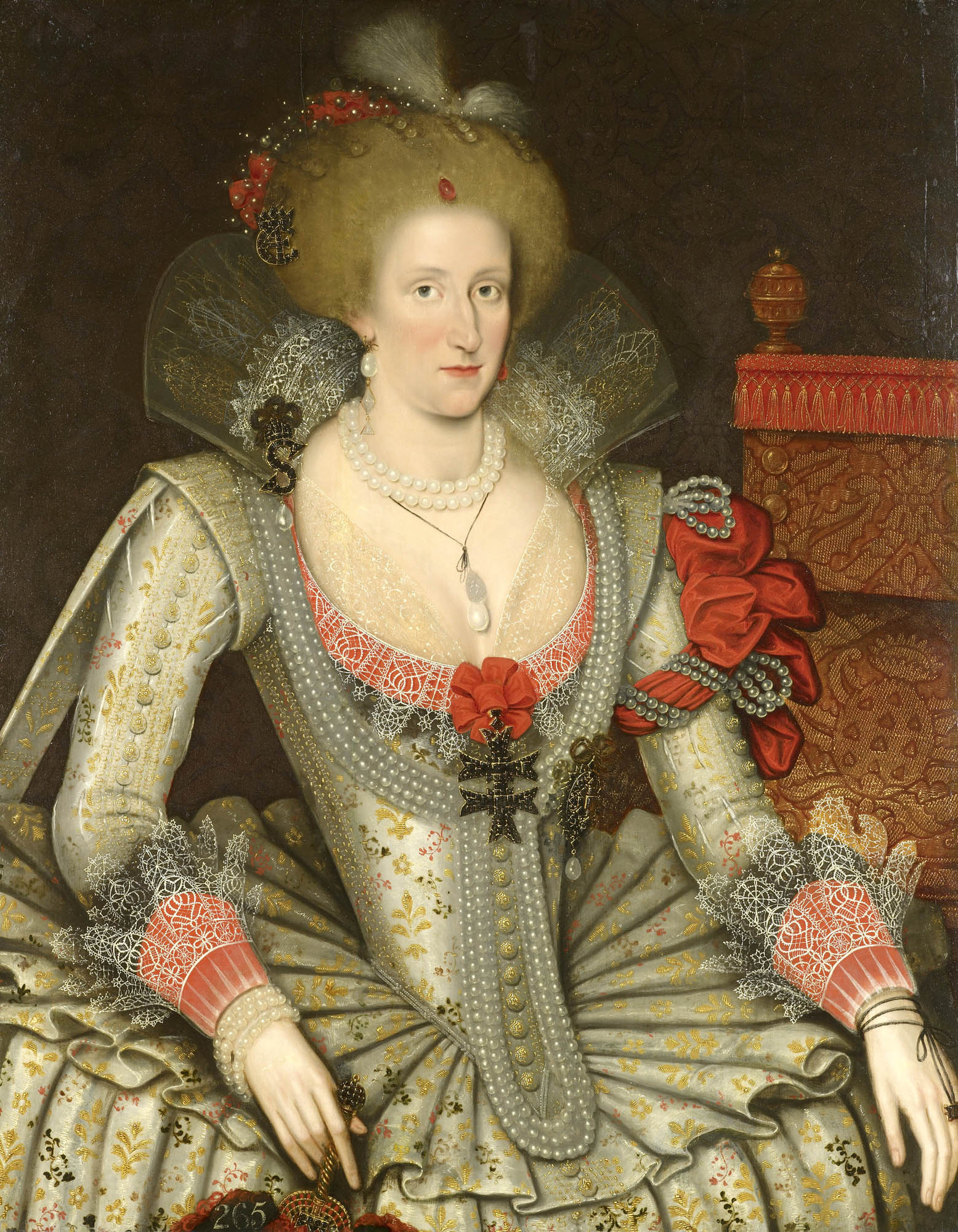
Anne of Denmark wears a double cross set with diamonds. Philip Jacobson valued some of her jewels for sale in June 1629, Marcus Gheeraerts, Royal Collection,

== Career ==
He was a son of Philip Jacob Jacobson of Antwerp and Anne de Croyes, a daughter of Philipp de Croyes or Croyer of Antwerp. He resided in St Margaret's parish in Billingsgate London. King James vetoed his bid become an English citizen or denizen in 1624, which required an Act of Parliament, in order to continue to profit from customs revenue generated by his trade.

In May 1605 Arnold Lulls was paid £1,550 and Jacobson was paid £980 for jewels set with diamonds and two dozen buttons given to Anne of Denmark at the baptism of her daughter Princess Mary.

He supplied Anne of Denmark with a jewel worth £400 as a New Year's Day gift to Princess Elizabeth for January 1607. In June 1607 he supplied a "jewel like a rose of diamonds with great pendant pearls" valued at £2200 as one of King James' gifts to the Prince Joinville, brother of the Duke of Guise, who was visiting England. Jacobson bought a great diamond from the East India Company in March 1614 for £535. In 1620 he was an investor or "adventurer" in the Virginia Company.

In 1624 Lionel Cranfield, the Lord Treasurer, appointed Philip Jacobson as a goldsmith to the king, noting that a predecessor George Heriot was dead and two other royal goldsmiths John Spilman and William Herrick rarely did any work for the crown. He made two "picture-cases" or miniature cases for King James and a hat-band set with 37 diamonds, and a diamond ring for Charles I, for which he was paid £2380 in 1627. Jacobson gave a pair of gloves to Charles I as a New Year's Day gift in 1627.

In June 1629, King Charles appointed Jacobson and the goldsmiths James Heriot, Thomas Simpson, and William Tirrey to appraise crown jewels selected for sale by Francis Cottington, James Maxwell, and George Bingley. The jewels to be valued included Anne of Denmark's jewelled circlet, and two pearls from the Mirror of Great Britain. The final selection, including Anne of Denmark's diamond and ruby double or Lorraine cross priced at £300, was valued at £3000 and William Tirrey was appointed to manage the sale.

== Family ==
Philip Jacobson married Elizabeth, a daughter of John van Soldt. They had seven children. His widow became the owner of recently enclosed lands in the former Forest of Braydon, which her husband had accepted for a royal debt.
