= Aigrette =

Tufted crest of an egret

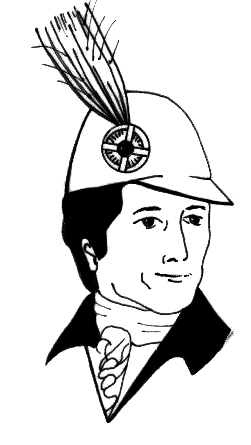
Aigrette on a hat

The term aigrette (pronounced /eɪɡrɛt/; from the French for egret, or lesser white heron) refers to the tufted crest or head-plumes of the egret, used for adorning a headdress. The word may also identify any similar ornament, in gems.

== History and description ==
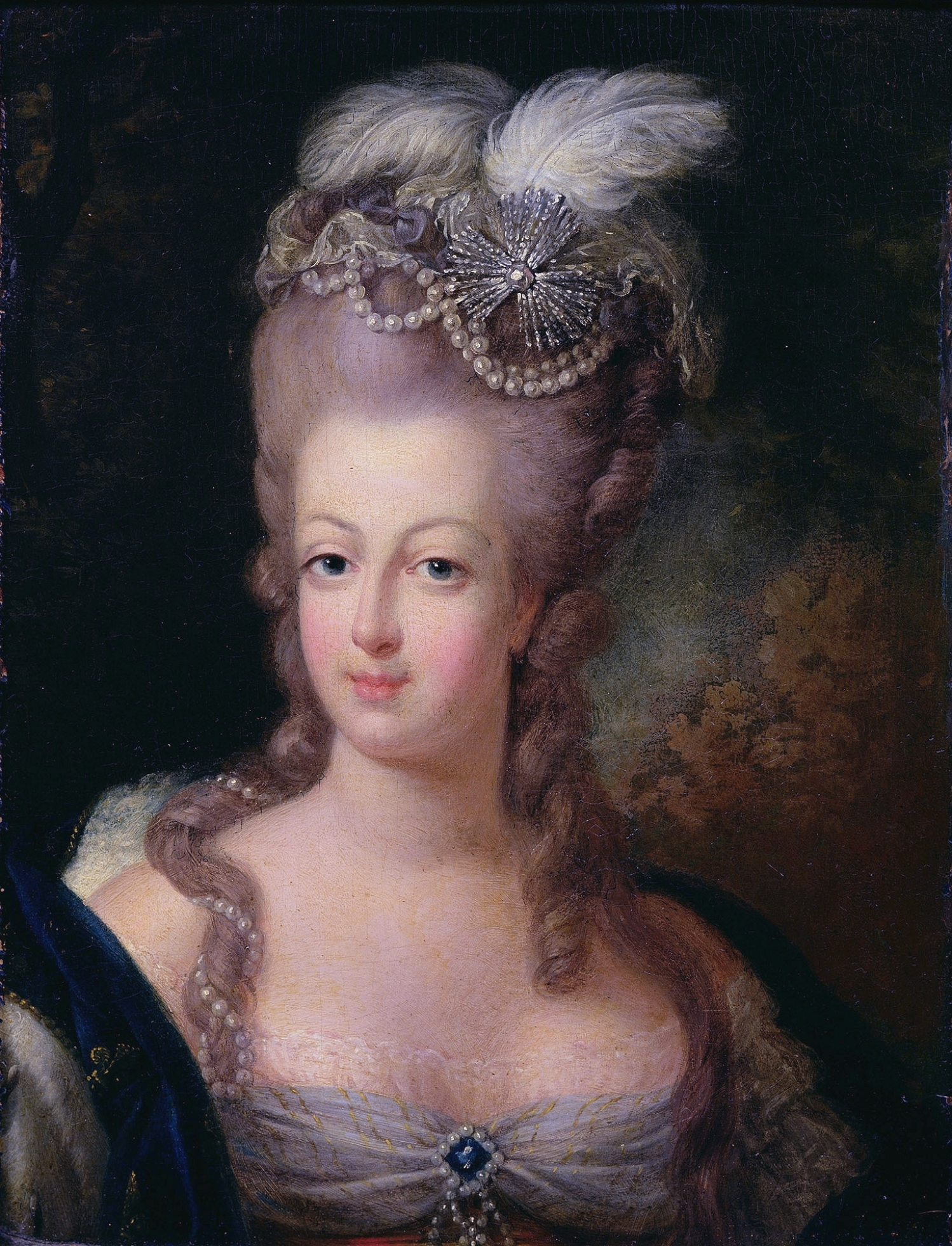
Marie-Antoinette with aigrette

Aigrettes, studded with diamonds and rubies, decorated the turbans of Ottoman sultans or the ceremonial chamfron of their horses. Several of these aigrettes are on display in the Treasury of the Topkapı Palace in Istanbul, Turkey. An aigrette was also formerly worn by certain ranks of officers in the French army.

Jewelled aigrettes and "diamond feathers" worn at the English court of James VI and I and Anne of Denmark are associated with the goldsmith Arnold Lulls whose book of designs still survives.

During the late 19th and early 20th centuries a fad in women's fashion for wearing extravagant and fanciful aigrettes resulted in large numbers of egrets and other birds being slaughtered by plume hunters for the millinery industry, until public reaction and government intervention caused the fad to end and demand for such plumes collapse.

The 61.50 carat (12.3 g) whiskey-coloured diamond, "The Eye of the Tiger", was mounted by Cartier in a turban aigrette for the Jam Sahib or Maharajah of Nawanagar in 1934.

The yellow 137.27 carat Florentine Diamond was last set as a part of an aigrette.

== Similarly shaped objects ==
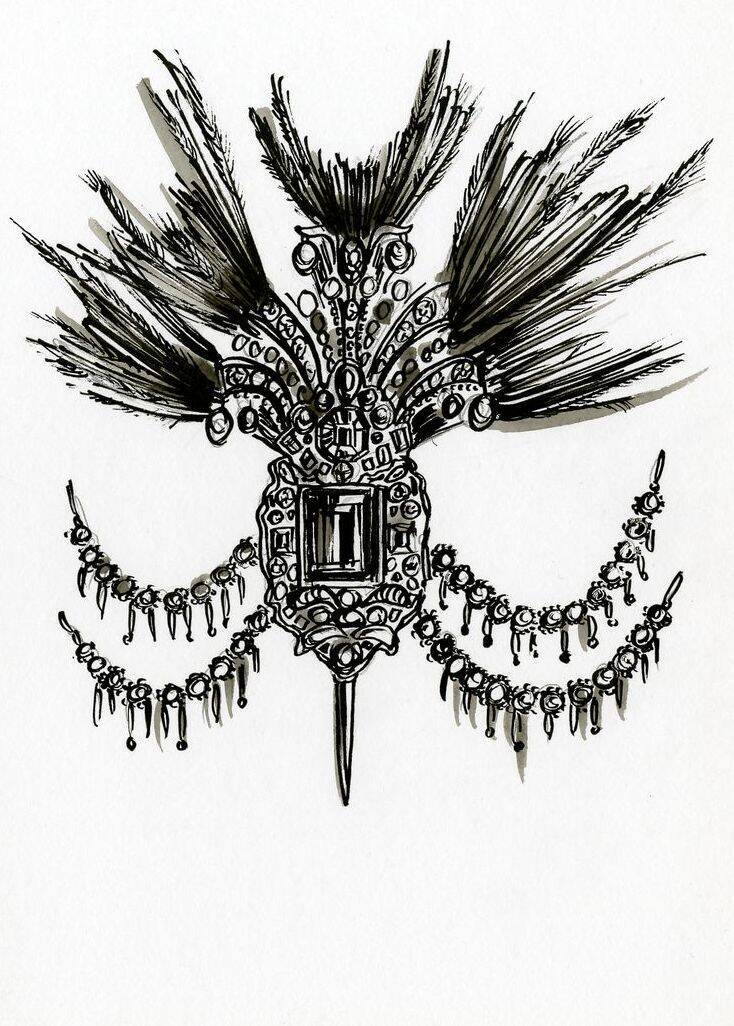
Sketch of an aigrette, showing plumes anchored on the top of a decorative headpiece.

The word aigrette is used to describe several things with a similar shape. It is the name given to a type of deep-fried fritter made of batter in an elongated shape.

By analogy the word is used in various sciences for feathery excrescences of like appearance, as for the tufts on the heads of insects, the feathery down of the dandelion, the luminous rays at the end of electrified bodies, or the luminous rays—seen in solar eclipses—diverging from the moon's edge.

The Chelengk and Sarpech were similar Turkish military decoration.
