= John Spilman =

German entrepreneur

Sir John Spilman (also spelt Spielman) (died 1626) was a Lindau, Holy Roman Empire-born businessman who founded the first commercially successful paper-mill in England, establishing a factory on the River Darenth in Dartford, Kent in 1588. Spilman was also jeweller to Queen Elizabeth I, and was knighted by King James I.

== Paper making ==
In 1588 Spilman was granted a Crown lease on two mills in the Manor of Bignores at Dartford (the mills were previously leased to local landowner William Vaughan who died in 1580). Spilman repaired and altered the mills, at an estimated cost of £1,500, and financed the employment of skilled German paper-makers to produce good quality white paper. One of the first works published using Spilman's paper was a poem by Thomas Churchyard dedicated to Sir Walter Raleigh thus:

A sparke of friendship, and warm good will; with a poem concerning the commodity of sundry sciences; especially concerning paper, and a mill, lately set up near Dartfort by a high German, called Mr. Spilman, jeweller to the queen majesty.

The works became a major source of local employment, with some 600 workers.

Spilman had licence to buy linen rags for paper making in January 1589. He secured a patent dated 7 February 1589 giving him a monopoly in buying materials for making white paper and preventing anyone from setting up in competition without his permission. This monopoly was extended by a further 14 years in July 1597 and effectively prevented other mills from making highly prized white paper (most rival concerns were engaged in producing inferior quality brown paper).

Spilman is also reputed to have been responsible for introducing lime (linden; Tilia) trees into the UK.

== Goldsmith to Queen Elizabeth ==
In 1587, Elizabeth asked Spilman, her household goldsmith, to employ English and foreign ("stranger") diamond cutters, ruby cutters, agate cutters, clockmakers, goldsmiths, and wire workers. In January 1589 he was ordered to make gold buttons for the queen from two old gold collars which were formed of S-shaped pieces and knots of gold, with enamelled gold roses.

In 1593 Richard Butler, captain of one of Walter Raleigh's ships, said Spilman dealt in jewels at court, was about 38 and had a long chestnut beard and a scar on his forehead. He thought he was Flemish.

In 1598 he sold a jewel called the "Rainbow" to the Earl of Northumberland for £21, and in September 1600 a jewel which Northumberland gave to the queen with a petticoat provided by Audrey Walsingham, together worth £200. In October 1600 Spilman, Leonard Bushe and Hugh Kayle appraised and sold a quantity of old jewels from the Tower of London on the orders of Queen Elizabeth. These included pearls that had been embroidered on the Queen's gowns.

== Jewels for King James and Anna of Denmark ==
Spilman and William Herrick formed a partnership to work for King James I and Anne of Denmark. Spilman wrote to Sir Robert Cecil that "Herrick and I are joined together in the works for his Majesty, and agree like friends." He asked Cecil to ask Sir George Home, Keeper of the Privy Purse, to speed up their payment. They also worked with Arnold Lulls.

They made jewels for the coronations, refashioned the armille, ampulla, and sceptre, and mounted a large number of precious and imitation stones in collets so they could be sewn on the king's cloth-of-estate in the Abbey. The 133 stones for the cloth included; opals, amethysts, pseudo-amethysts, yellow stones, pseudo-topazes, pseudo-sapphires, pseudo-emeralds, pseudo-diamonds, pseudo-rubies, and other "made stones". Anne of Denmark was crowned with a "circlet" of gold set with diamonds, rubies, sapphires, emeralds, and pearls. Some of the gems incorporated in the circlet were obtained by dismantling Elizabeth's jewels. They made insignia of the Order of the Garter and Georges, some to be sent to the Duke of Württemberg. On the instructions of Mary Radcliffe they had mended some old pieces from the collection of Queen Elizabeth, including; a branch of tree with a half moon; a gold feather jewel set with rubies, emeralds, and pearls; a ring enamelled like crayfish with a large diamond. The Earl of Nottingham and other lords inspected their invoice and recommended it should be reduced by £74-13s-1d.

They also made a jewel for the king's hat in the shape of the letter "I". This included two great rubies and a great and a lesser diamond. One of the diamonds was taken from an old jewel belonging to Anna of Denmark. The remainder of the queen's jewel was broken up by Nicasius Russell in 1609 to make gold plate. The "I" or "J" jewel was delivered to Charles I of England in November 1625.

On 12 January 1604 Spilman and Herrick were asked to assess and make an inventory of jewels that had belonged to Queen Elizabeth. James had already given many pieces to the queen, Princess Elizabeth, and Arbella Stuart and others. The remaining jewels had been transferred from the keeping of Mary Radcliffe, former gentlewoman to Queen Elizabeth, to the Countess of Suffolk. Other pieces of Elizabeth's jewellery were delivered by Thomas Knyvet. He had kept them at Westminster Palace on the instructions of Queen Elizabeth, and James and his courtiers sent some to Spilman and Herrick for valuation, with an ivory coffer, and a "great rich glass set with diamonds rubies emeralds and pearls, made in the form of a woman upon a pillar or case holding a clock with diverse motions" worth £2,739 brought from the Tower of London.

On 4 January 1605 Spilman requested payment for a chain of pearls and six diamond rings delivered to George Home, now Lord Berwick, as keeper of the royal wardrobe, a tablet or locket of gold set with diamonds given by the Lord Chancellor to Anna of Denmark to send to Denmark worth £700, a jewel like a fleur de lys for a French woman, three dozen buttons each set with five diamonds for Anna of Denmark, with three dozen set with four diamonds and a ruby, and three dozen large buttons of "Spanish work" each with four rubies and a diamond.

In the same month, Spilman and two other goldsmiths loaned jewels for the costumes The Masque of Blackness. The borrowed jewels were valued at £10,000, and Anne of Denmark's chamberlain, Robert Sidney, became liable for £40 for two lost diamonds.

John Spilman was knighted by James I in 1605, probably in relation to his work as court goldsmith and jeweller rather than his paper-making exploits. At the same time, he was also granted the Manor of Bexley, which he subsequently sold to William Camden. In 1605 he supplied a number of "gold tablets", cases for miniature portraits of the King and Queen, set with rubies and diamonds. In May 1605 he supplied a tablet locket with two pictures to the Earl of Hertford for his embassy.

In July 1606 Spilman and William Herrick supplied pearls for the King's embroiderer William Broderick at the time of the visit of Christian IV of Denmark, the brother of Anna of Denmark. The pearls were intended for the king's saddle and the furniture of his horse, and the panes of the kings hose or stockings. Spilman was tasked with setting and re-setting the "Portugal diamond" for the queen, placing it in a gold bodkin in 1607.

In December 1607 Spilman, Herrick, and the goldsmith John Williams were asked to polish and amend some pieces that Queen Elizabeth had mortgaged, and King James gave Anna of Denmark a cup made of unicorn horn, a gold ewer, a salt with a branch from which serpent's tongues and sapphires were suspended, and a crystal chess board with crystal and topaz chessmen. He supplied jewels and pearls worth £2,880 to King James for New Year's Day gifts to the queen, Princess Elizabeth and the Duke of York in January 1610. Prince Henry bought a diamond ring for £400.

John Spilman made record drawings of the cut and settings of eleven diamonds which Anne of Denmark pawned in March 1615. He obtained a loan of £3000 for the queen from six London merchants. The sum was repaid in 1621.

In 1618 a German aristocrat, Benjamin Bouwinghausen von Walmerode (1571-1635), mentioned in a letter that he knew several courtiers in London including Thomas Murray and David Murray of Gorthy, and listed Spilman amongst the "lesser known" of his acquaintances. In 1619 Spilman, with the other royal jewellers Abraham Harderet, George Heriot, and William Herrick, joined the funeral procession of Anna of Denmark in 1619.

Spilman, who lived in the parish of St Martin's-in-the-Fields also lent money on jewels. In or before 1621 he hosted Andrew Sinclair as ambassador from Denmark.

In 1624 Lionel Cranfield, the Lord Treasurer, appointed Philip Jacobson as a goldsmith to the king, noting that George Heriot was dead and Spilman and William Herrick rarely did any work.

== Family ==
Spilman died in 1626 and is commemorated in Holy Trinity Church, Dartford. His first wife Elizabeth Mengel, daughter of a Nuremberg merchant, died in 1607 aged 55. He had several children by his second wife Katherine who survived until about 1644. Anne Spilman was baptised at St Martin-in-the-Fields on 15 August 1609.
