= William Herrick (MP) =

English jeweller, courtier, diplomat and politician

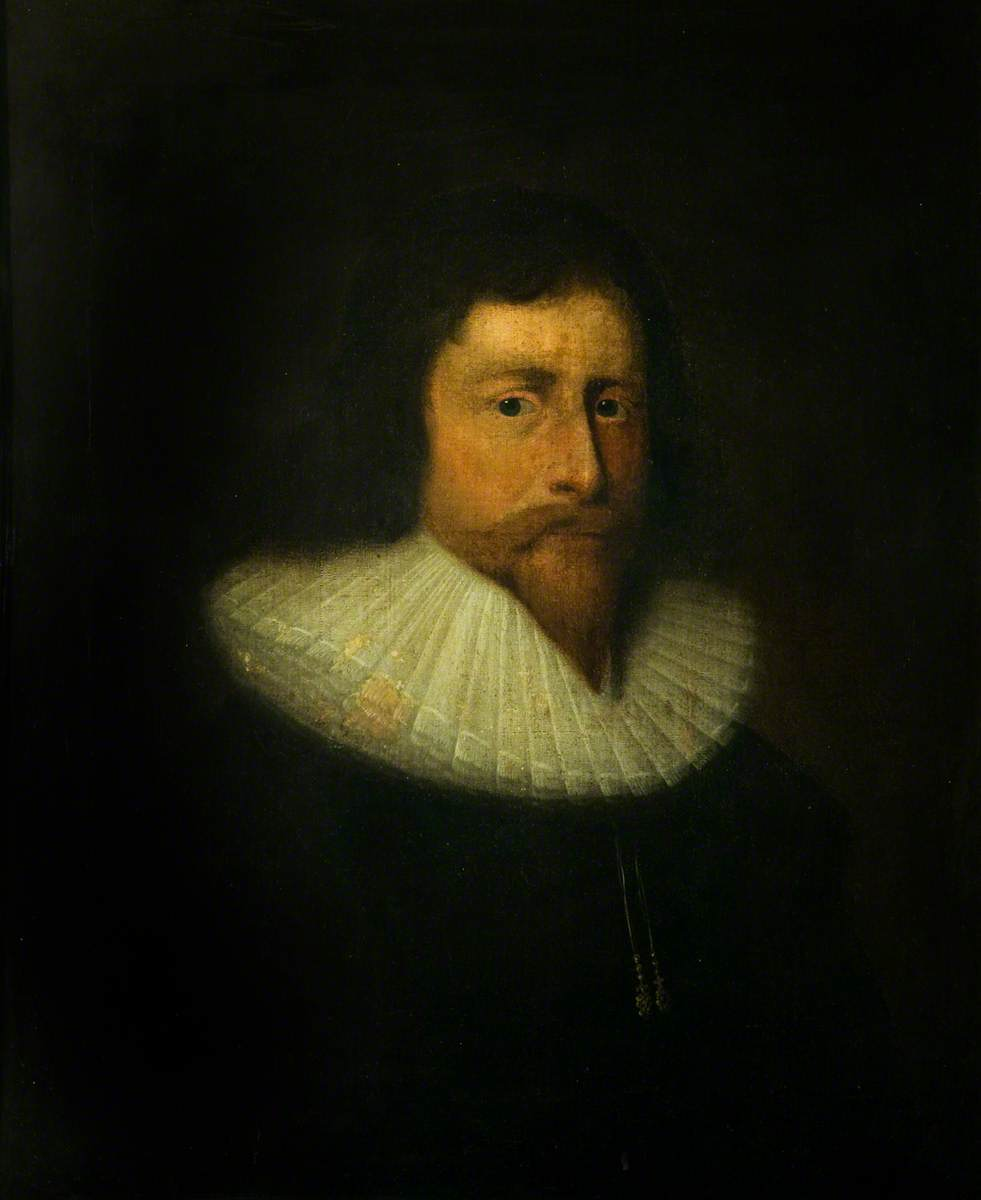
Image of Sir William Herrick

Sir William Herrick or Hericke (1562 – 2 March 1653) was an English jeweller, courtier, diplomat and politician who sat in the House of Commons at various times between 1601 and 1622.

== Life ==
Herrick was the son of John Heyrick of Leicester and was baptised on 9 December 1562. His father was an ironmonger at Leicester. He was sent to London in about 1574 to be apprenticed to his elder brother Nicholas Herrick, a goldsmith in Cheapside. After six years he set up a business on his own in Wood Street on premises leased from the Goldsmith's Company. Clients included the Kytson family.

Herrick was also a moneylender and in a few years he had made himself a fortune and was able to purchase Beau Manor Park from the Earl of Essex, and obtained a right to arms. He came to the notice of Queen Elizabeth, who sent him on a mission to the Ottoman Porte and on his return he was rewarded with a lucrative appointment in the Exchequer. He was made a freeman of Leicester in 1601 when he presented the corporation with a dozen silver spoons in lieu of a fee.

In 1601, Herrick was elected Member of Parliament for Leicester. He became principal jeweller to King James, Anne of Denmark and Prince Henry in 1603, and held the post until 1625. Herrick and John Spilman repaired some of the crown jewels for the coronation of James and Anne of Denmark. They also worked with Arnold Lulls.

On 12 January 1604 Herrick and Spilman were asked to assess and make an inventory of jewels that had belonged to Queen Elizabeth. James had already given many pieces to the queen, Princess Elizabeth, and Arbella Stuart and others. The remaining jewels had been transferred from the keeping of Mrs Mary Radcliffe, former gentlewoman to Queen Elizabeth, to the Countess of Suffolk. Other pieces of Elizabeth's jewellery were delivered by Thomas Knyvet. He had kept them at Westminster Palace on the instructions of Queen Elizabeth, and James and his courtiers sent some to Spilman and Herrick for valuation, with an ivory coffer, and a "great rich glass set with diamonds rubies emeralds and pearls, made in the form of a woman upon a pillar or case holding a clock with diverse motions" worth £2,739 brought from the Tower of London.

He became a freeman of the City of London in May 1605 and was knighted in the same year. It was said that the King knighted him for the difficult task of making a hole in a great diamond that he wore.

In July 1606 Herrick and John Spilman supplied pearls for the King's embroiderer William Broderick at the time of the visit of Christian IV of Denmark, the brother of Anne of Denmark. The pearls were intended for the king's saddle and the furniture of his horse, and the panes of the kings hose or stockings.

He served as MP for Leicester for part of the 1604–1611 parliament. He was prime warden of the Goldsmiths’ Company from 1605 to 1606. In 1607 he took as apprentice his nephew Robert the future poet. In 1621 he was elected MP for Leicester again.

In 1612 Herrick lent £2 to the painter Nicholas Hilliard, a fellow member of the Goldsmith's Company, and Hilliard had to pawn a miniature portrait of King James to repay this debt.

In 1624 Lionel Cranfield, the Lord Treasurer, appointed Philip Jacobson as a goldsmith to the king, noting that George Heriot was dead and Spilman and Herrick rarely did any work.

Herrick, with the other royal jewellers Abraham Harderet, George Heriot and John Spilman, joined the funeral procession of Anna of Denmark in 1619.

Herrick died at the age of about 90 and was buried at St Martin's Church, Leicester.

== Family ==
Herrick married Joan May, daughter of Richard May of London and of Mayfield Place, Sussex on 6 May 1596, and had at least one son, Henry Herrick, born 1604. His brother Robert was also an MP.

Herrick was the uncle, and later guardian, of the poet Robert Herrick and supported him financially during his time at Cambridge.

== Bibliography ==
- Rigg, James McMullen (1891). "Hericke, William" . In Stephen, Leslie; Lee, Sidney (eds.). Dictionary of National Biography. Vol. 26. London: Smith, Elder & Co. pp. 243–244.

Parliament of England
Preceded by George Parkins; John Stanford II	Member of Parliament for Leicester; 1601; With: George Belgrave	Succeeded by William Skipwith; Henry Beaumont
Preceded by Henry Rich; Sir Francis Leigh	Member of Parliament for Leicester; 1621–1622; With: Sir Richard Moryson	Succeeded by Sir Humphrey May; William Ive
