= Thomas Cletcher =

17th-century Dutch jeweller and gem dealer

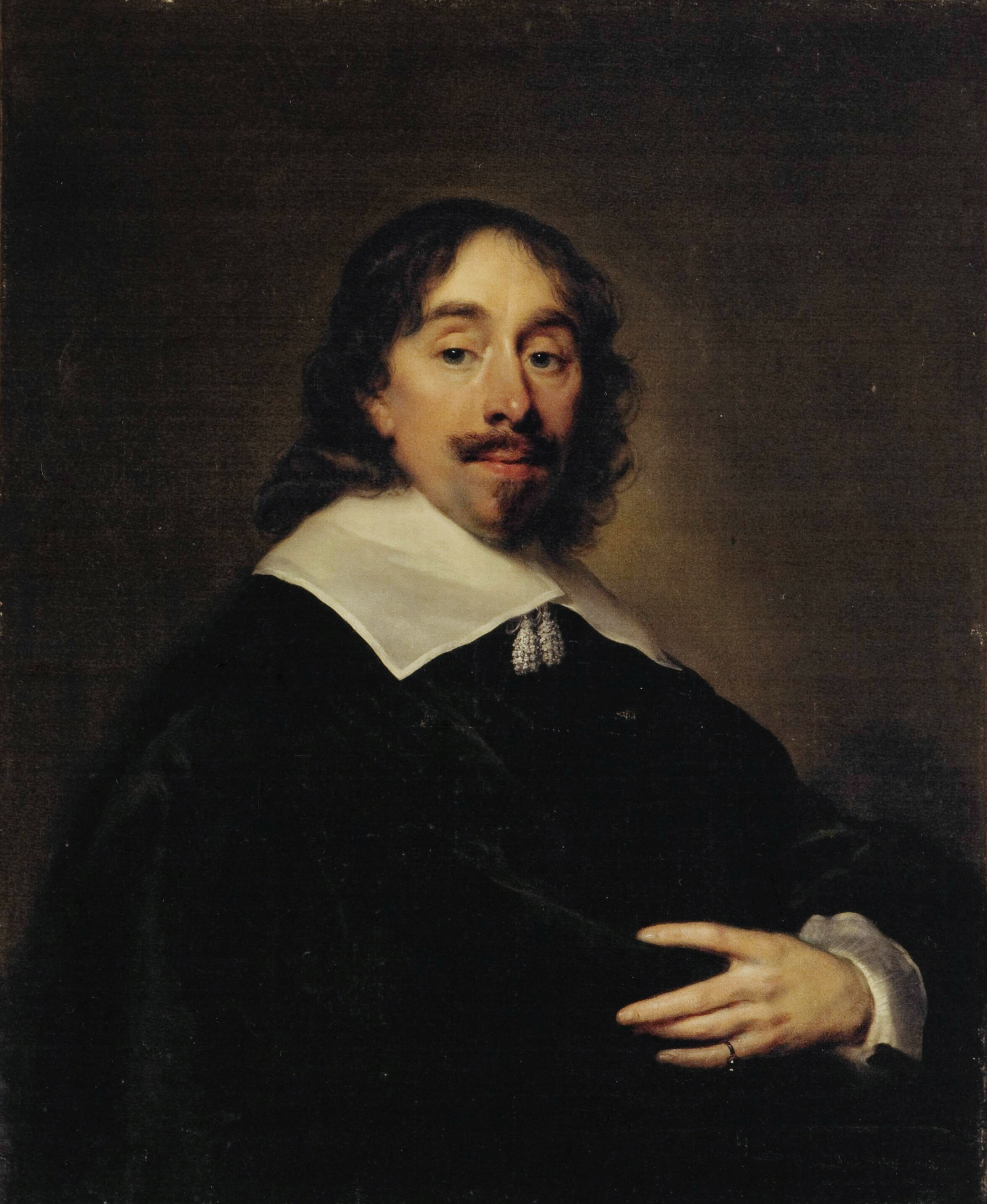
- Cletcher in 1643, portrait by Cornelius Johnson
- Born: 1598; The Hague
- Died: 2 June 1666 (age 68); Amersfoort
- Other names: Thomas Cletscher jr.
- Occupations: Jeweller, gem dealer, mayor

Thomas Cletcher (1598 – 2 June 1666) was a Dutch jeweller, goldsmith, and gem dealer from The Hague, who was involved in several transactions of jewels of historical significance, and also served as the city's mayor from 1652 to 1657.

== Family and early life ==
The Cletcher family (sometimes also spelled Cletscher, Clisser, Clitsert, Clitchert, Cletzer, and van Cletcher) originally lived in Colchester, England. The family emigrated to the Low Countries in the mid-16th century, where Thomas Cletcher Sr. registered as a burgher of the city of Antwerp in 1560. As a result of turmoil stemming from the Eighty Years' War between the Dutch and the Habsburg Netherlands, the Cletchers moved north in 1585 and settled in The Hague in the newly founded Dutch Republic. The son of Cletcher Sr. – also named Thomas – became a wine merchant in The Hague and married Tanneken van Bree in 1597; the couple welcomed their firstborn Thomas Cletcher in 1598 (sometimes styled as Thomas Cletcher jr. to distinguish him from his father and grandfather).

Thomas grew up in an upper middle class household with at least one brother, the cartographer, painter and printer Daniël Cletcher (c.1599–1632). He lived with his parents until 1625, when he married Anna Ghijsberti, a jeweller's daughter from Antwerp. After Anna's death in 1638, Thomas married Adriana van der Willigen in 1639, the widow of Hendrick van Wouw, the son of the mayor of The Hague. When Adriana died only one year after the wedding, Thomas remarried a third time in 1642; this time the bride was Anna Hoeufft, daughter of a Dordrecht noble and merchant. Marriage into the Hoeufft family increased Thomas's reputation, but he would ultimately outlive even his third wife by two years.

== Jeweller and goldsmith ==
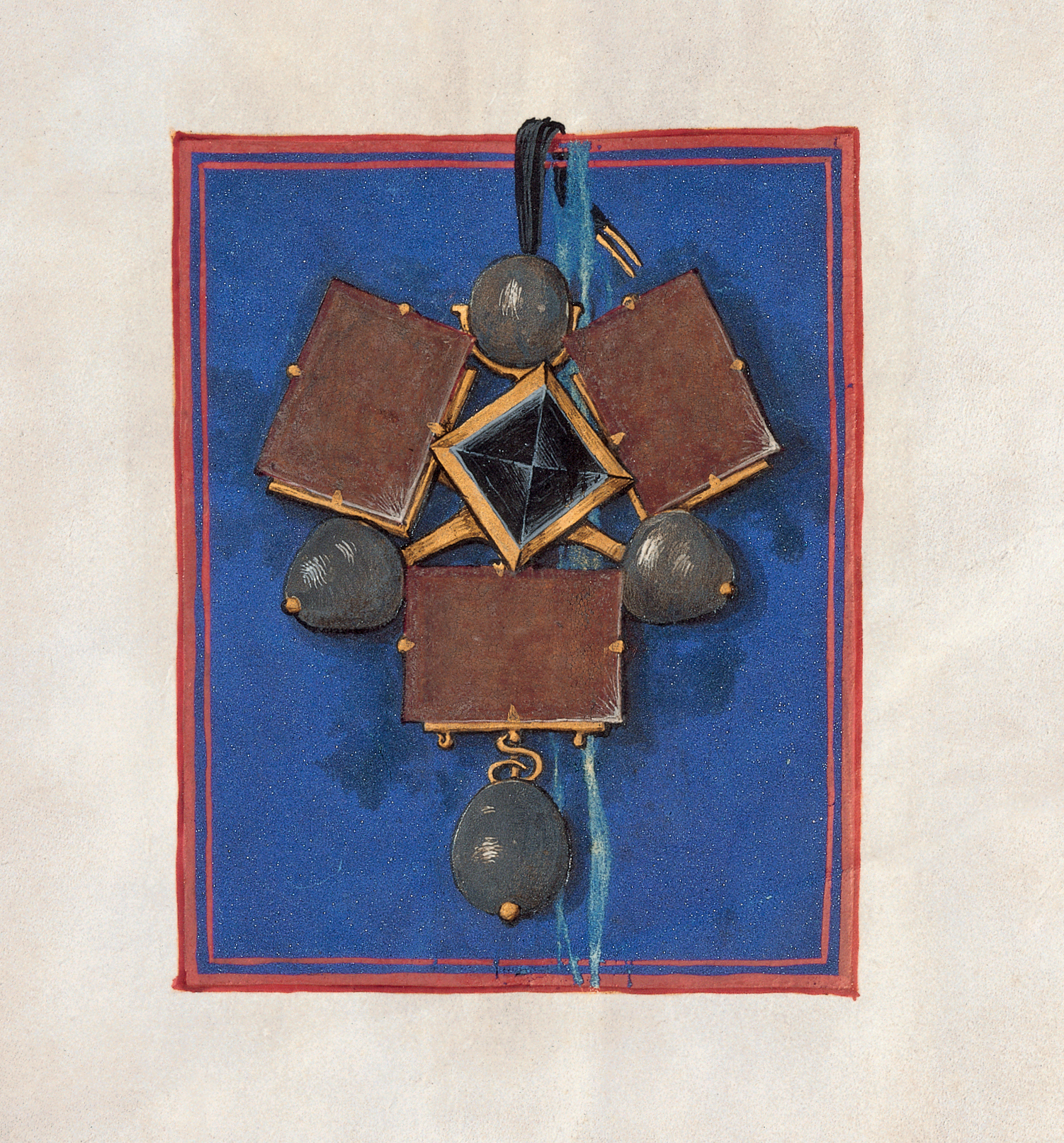
The Three Brothers jewel, which Henrietta Maria possibly sold or pawned to Cletcher in the 1640s

Thomas Cletcher is known to posterity mostly through his profession as a jeweller, goldsmith, and gem dealer. In 1626, he designed a piece of jewellery in the shape of a branch of the Polygonatum plant, also known as 'Solomon's Seal'. The piece caught the attention of Frederick Henry, Prince of Orange, at the time Stadtholder of The Hague, who agreed to buy it for the large sum of 27,000 guilders. As a result of his prowess, Cletcher became Dean of the Guild of Gold- and Silversmiths in 1630 at the age of only 32, a position which he skillfully leveraged to make connections with various European noble houses. Possibly due to his English ancestry, he developed a long-lasting connection with the English royal house, but was equally sought after by other monarchs as an appraiser, intermediary in gem trades, and buyer of jewels that they wanted to pawn or sell. Cletcher kept extensive notes on his trades and produced drawings of the most notable objects, the majority of which survived and are held today by the Museum Boijmans Van Beuningen in Rotterdam.

In 1625, Cletcher was the agent of choice when Charles I of England sent his wife Henrietta Maria to the continent to pawn away what she could of the English crown jewels in order to alleviate Charles' financial troubles. Henrietta Maria traded one of England's most impressive pieces of jewellery–the hat jewel known as the Mirror of Great Britain–to Cletcher, who recorded the item in his sketchbook with the note that it had been "commissioned by Coninc Jacobus" (Charles' predecessor James VI and I). The Mirror consisted of three large diamonds, one from the Great H of Scotland, with an equally large ruby, and hanging underneath, one of the largest cut diamonds that existed in Europe at the time, the 55-carat Sancy. While Charles was able to redeem the Sancy some 13 years later in 1639, the Mirror was broken up by Cletcher and never returned to England.

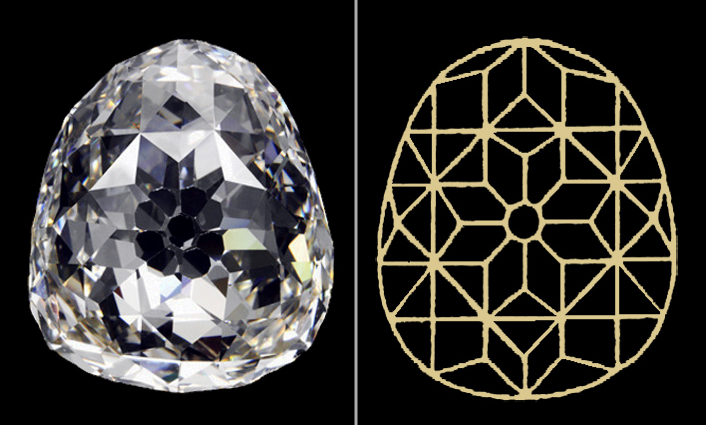
Comparison between a copy of the Beau Sancy diamond and Cletcher's 1644 sketch

Over the next decades, Cletcher became a major force in the Northern European market for diamonds and jewellery. It has been speculated that Cletcher was the buyer or middleman when Henrietta Maria attempted to pawn the Three Brothers in 1643/44 in an attempt to finance Charles' army in the First English Civil War. The Brothers were a crown jewel that was already 250 years old by then, and which had been owned by Duke John the Fearless, banker Jakob Fugger and Queen Elizabeth I. The jewel is considered lost since 1645, and might have been sold or broken up by Cletcher after acquiring it. In 1644, he engineered the purchase of the 35-carat Beau Sancy diamond–the smaller sibling to the Sancy–from the estate of the late Marie de' Medici by Frederick Henry, whose appetite for luxury had grown with the successes of the Dutch Republic. Cletcher brought the Prince in contact with an Italian gem dealer living in Amsterdam, who received 80,000 guilders for the Beau Sancy. Cletcher recorded the transaction with great satisfaction in his notebook, as he believed the jewel to in fact be worth 150,000 guilders, making the sale a true bargain for his benefactor Frederick Henry.

In 1652, Cletcher sold a pearl necklace to his regular customer Henrietta Maria, who at this point lived in exile in Paris after the execution of her husband Charles I. English royal jewels pawned with Cletcher in 1655 included a great cross of diamonds.

In addition to his activities as a jeweller, Cletcher was also a skillful investor in schemes such as the draining of marshland in the Poitou region of France, milling in Sweden, and various real estate purchases. While his family assets are recorded as 6,000 guilders in 1627, by 1654 this had grown to over 90,000 guilders.

== Public service and later life ==
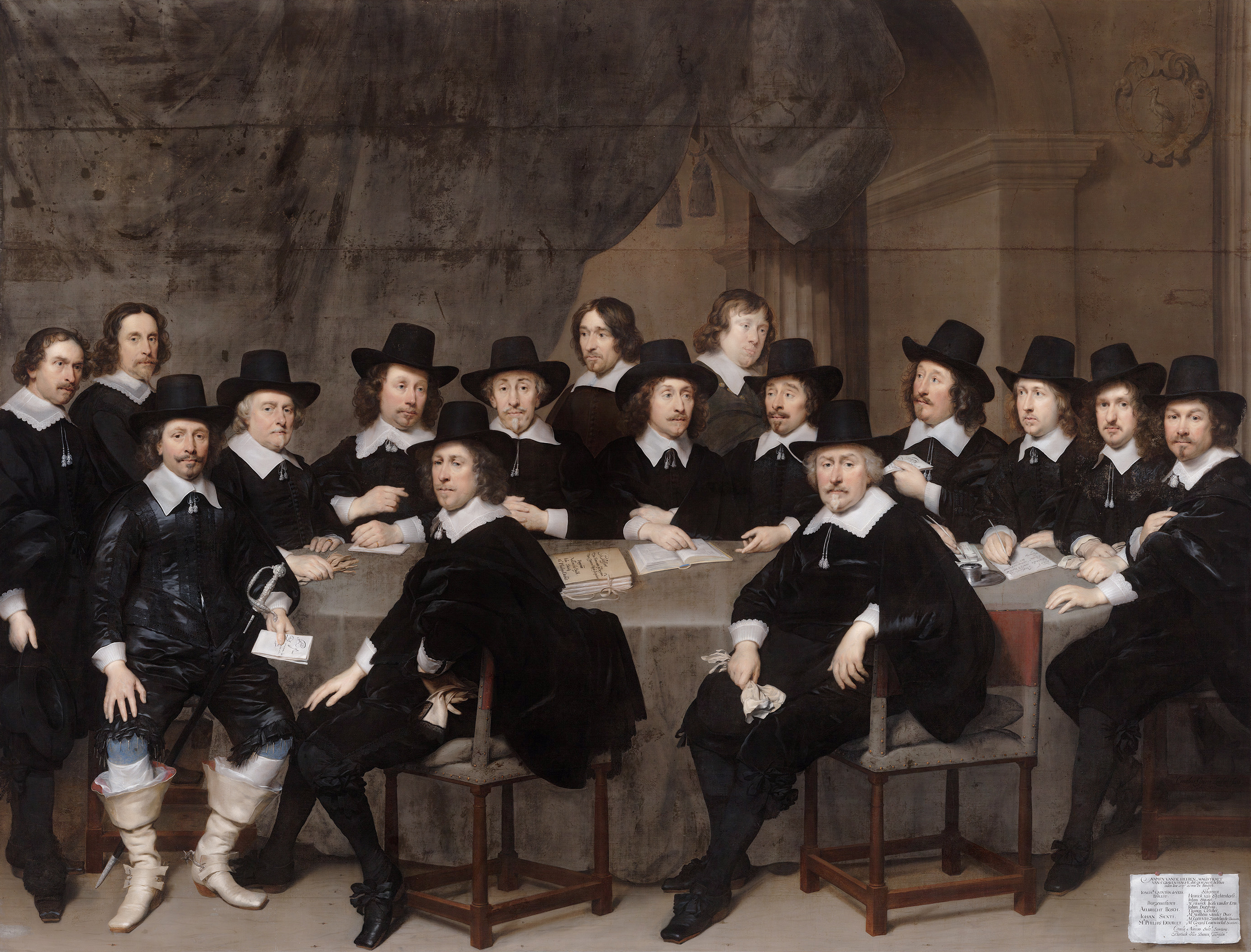
The Municipality of The Hague, by Cornelis van Ceulen (1647). Cletcher is sixth from the right.

Cletcher received his first appointment to the Hague city council in 1643, which might have been helped by his marriage into the noble Hoeufft family. His first term as alderman of the council began in 1645, a position to which he was reelected several times, before ultimately becoming mayor of The Hague in 1652. The mayorship was a highly prestigious post, and would have been considered the crowning achievement of a burgher's life. Cletcher served as mayor until 1657, when he retired from his business; he moved to nearby Amersfoort in 1659, where his son Thomas was mayor. Cletcher died in Amersfoort on 2 June 1666.

From his first marriage with Anna Ghijsberti, Cletcher had five children:

- Thomas, later mayor of Amersfoort.
- Hendrik, secretary at the Dutch embassy in Sweden.
- Robert, painter and member of the Confrerie Pictura in The Hague.
- Anna, who married Otto Viglius, the commissioner for the region of Friesland in the States General of the Netherlands.
- Jacob, who died as a young man after his marriage in 1647.
