= Harclay =

Harclay is a surname. Notable people with the surname include:

- Andrew Harclay, 1st Earl of Carlisle (c. 1270–1323), English military leader
- Henry Harclay (c. 1270–1317), English medieval philosopher and university chancellor

== See also ==
- Harlay
