= Three Brothers (jewel) =

Lost 14th-century piece of jewellery

The Three Brothers
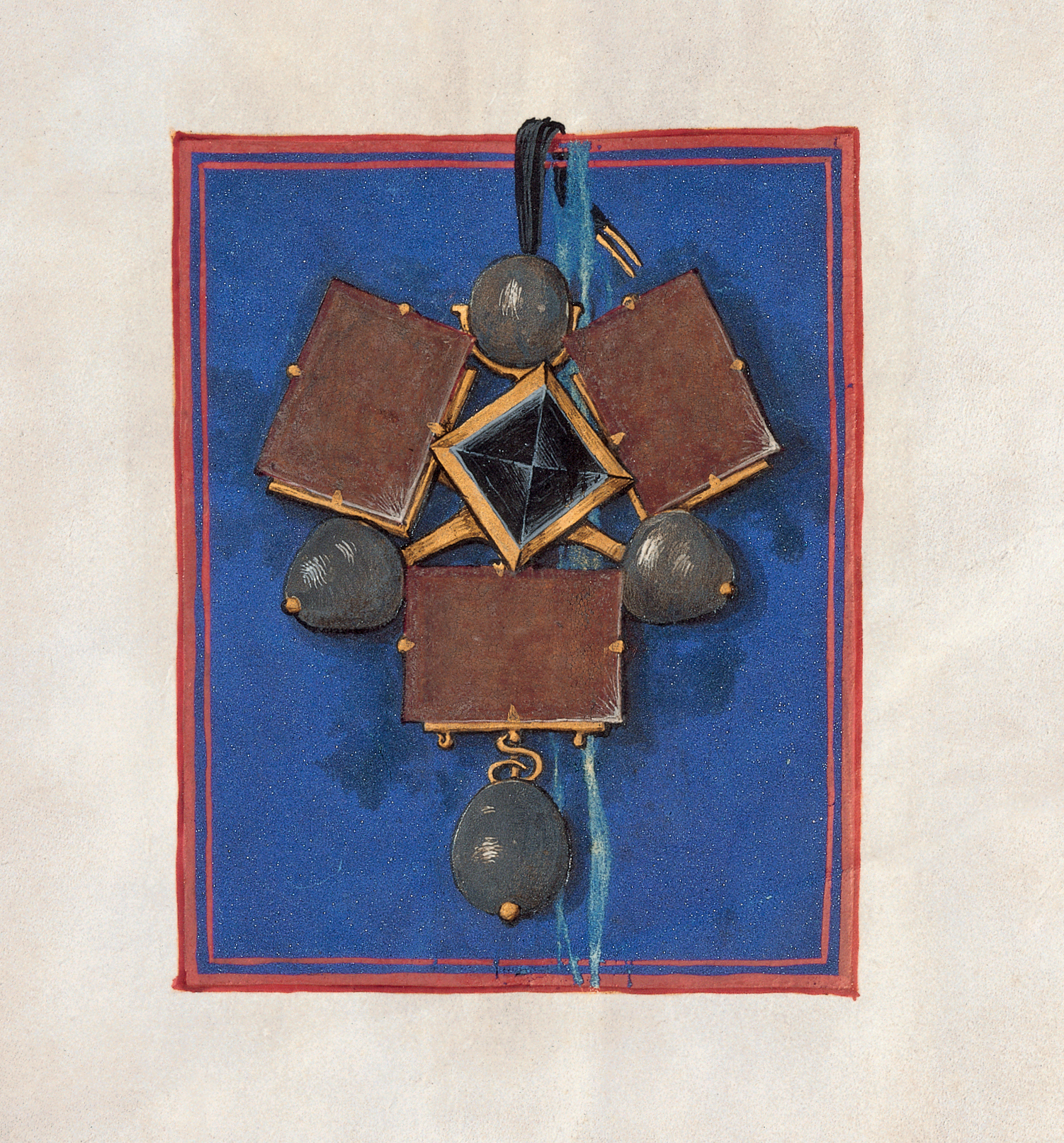
- Miniature painting of the Three Brothers, commissioned by the city of Basel, c. 1500
- Material: Spinels, pearls, diamond, gold
- Weight: ~300 carats (60 g) total
- Created: 1389
- Place: Paris, France
- Present location: Unknown since 1645

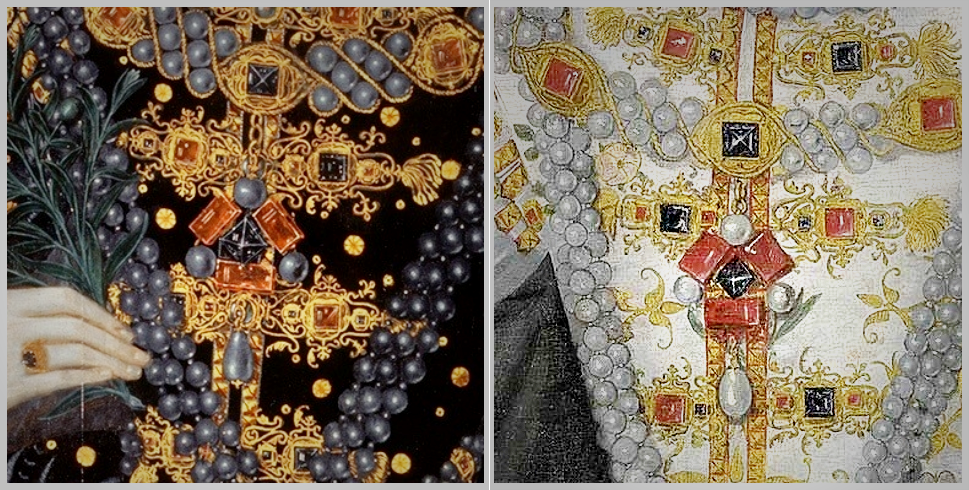
Detail of the Three Brothers from two portraits of Elizabeth I (full images shown below)

The Three Brothers (also known as the Three Brethren; German: Drei Brüder; French: Les Trois Frères) was a piece of jewellery created in the late 14th century, which consisted of three rectangular red spinels arranged around a central diamond. The jewel is known for having been owned by a number of important historical figures. After its commission by Duke John the Fearless of Burgundy, the jewel was part of the Burgundian crown jewels for almost 100 years, before passing into the possession of German banker Jakob Fugger.

The Brothers were eventually sold to Edward VI and became part of the Crown Jewels of England from 1551 to 1643. They were worn prominently by Queen Elizabeth I and King James VI and I. In the early 1640s, Henrietta Maria, wife of Charles I, attempted to sell the jewel to raise funds for the English Civil War, but it is unclear if she succeeded. Its whereabouts after 1645 remain unknown.

== Description ==
The Three Brothers remained essentially unchanged over more than 250 years. The jewel is known to have been reset at least once in 1623, but a variety of descriptions indicate that its original form and composition were retained over its entire lifespan. Originally made as a shoulder clasp or pendant, it consisted of three rectangular red spinels (then known as balas rubies) of 70 carats each in a triangular arrangement, separated by three round white pearls of 10–12 carats each, with another 18–20 carats pearl suspended from the lowest spinel. The middle of the pendant was a deep blue diamond weighing about 30 carats, in the shape of a pyramid, octahedron, or regular trisoctahedron. As there is little evidence for diamond cutting before 1400, it is likely the jeweller had merely squared off (described as "quarré" on the original invoice) its natural form. In its original form, the jewel had a size of 8.7 by 6.9 cm (3.4 by 2.7 in).

When the Brothers made their first appearance in an inventory—that of Duke Philip the Good of Burgundy in 1419—the jewel was described as:

A very fine and rich buckle, adorned in the middle with a very big pointed diamond, and around this are three fine square balas stones called the three brothers, and three sizable fine pearls in between these. Under this buckle hangs a very large fine pearl in the shape of a pear.

In 1587 the Three Brothers were listed among jewels delivered to Elizabethan courtier Mary Radcliffe and described as:

A faire Flower of Goulde with three greate Ballasses in the middest, a great poynted Dyamond and three greate Pearles fixte with a fair Pearle Pendant, called the Brethren.

== Early history ==
The jewel was commissioned by Duke John the Fearless of Burgundy in the late 1380s, and was one of the most precious treasures of the House of Burgundy. It was created by Parisian goldsmith Herman Ruissel in 1389; the jewel's sale is recorded through a bill dated 11 October and a receipt dated 24 November, both of which are kept in the Côte-d'Or Departmental Archives in Dijon. After receiving it in the 1390s, Duke John pawned the jewel in 1412, but redeemed it at some point before 1419. When the Duke, who was a major figure in the Armagnac–Burgundian Civil War over the French throne, was assassinated during a parley with the French dauphin (the future King Charles VII) in 1419, the Brothers were passed down to his son Philip the Good.

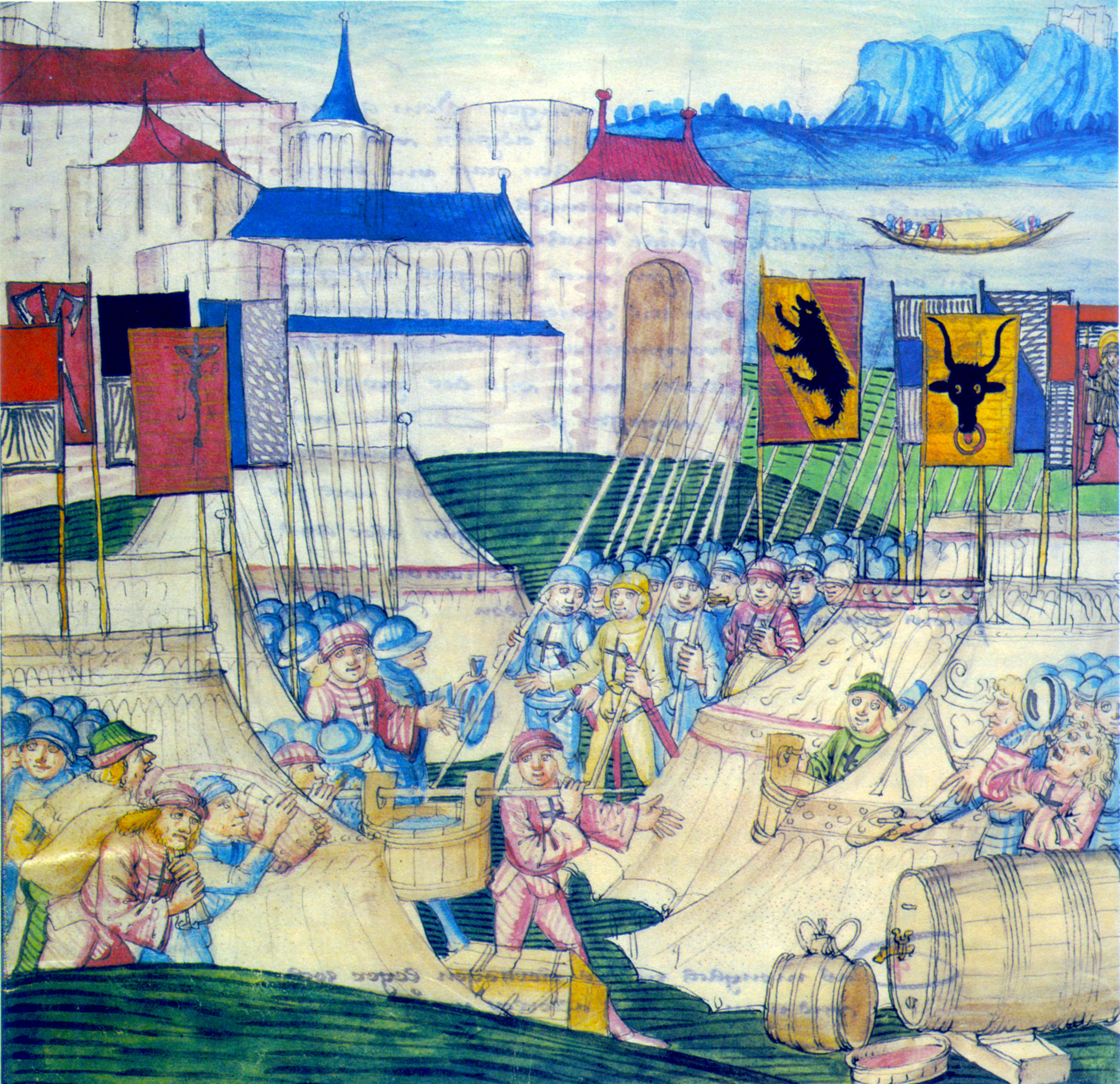
Looting of the Burgundian camp after the Battle of Grandson, by Diebold Schilling the Elder (1483)

The jewel remained in Burgundy during Philip's reign, and on his death in 1467 was inherited by his son Charles the Bold. Charles commanded one of the most powerful armies of his time, and travelled to battles with an array of priceless artefacts as talismans, including carpets having belonged to Alexander the Great, the bones of saints, the Sancy diamond, and the Three Brothers. In his conflict with the Old Swiss Confederacy during the Burgundian Wars, Charles suffered a catastrophic rout in March 1476, when he was attacked outside the village of Concise in the Battle of Grandson. Forced to flee in haste, Charles left behind his artillery and an immense booty, including his silver bath, the ducal seal, and the Brothers, all of which were looted from his tent by the confederate army. The pendant was sold to the magistrates of the city of Basel, who had the piece assessed by a Venetian expert. The city also commissioned a watercolour miniature painting at a scale of 1:1 to aid with an eventual sale, which provides the earliest visual record of the Brothers (as of 2026 in the Basel Historical Museum). The jewel disappeared from view during the next years, as the magistrates feared that the House of Habsburg, inheritors of the Duchy of Burgundy, would reclaim goods that they considered as having been stolen from Charles. The jewel was at last put on the market in 1502, with two magistrates acting as straw men for the city to ensure plausible deniability.

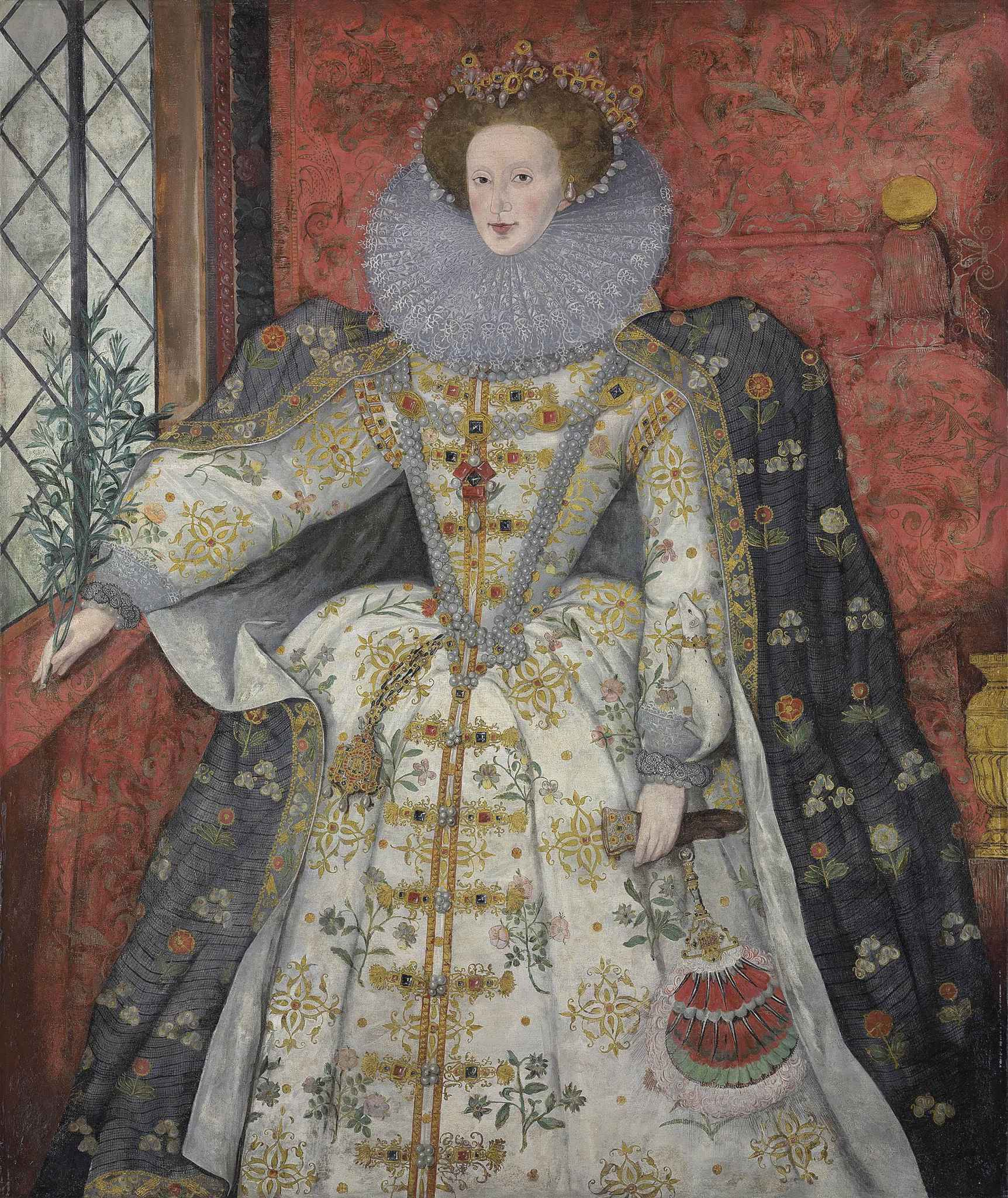
The Brothers in the anonymous painting Portrait of Queen Elizabeth I, c. 1585-1590

In 1504, Basel succeeded in selling the Three Brothers to Augsburg banker Jakob Fugger after a year of negotiations. A merchant by trade, Fugger had become one of the wealthiest individuals in history by dealing in textiles and metals, and through extending loans to the Habsburg dynasty. The Basel sale included the Brothers and three other pieces of jewellery from Charles' hoard—the Federlin (little feather), the Gürtelin (little garter) and the White Rose—for a total price of 40,200 florins, which at the time was enough to pay 3,300 common labourers for a year. While this constituted a significant expense, Fugger made many such transactions over the years, and the price pales in comparison to his total assets, which reached more than 2 million guilders at his death in 1525. For Fugger, jewellery and precious stones were a highly fungible capital reserve, and an investment to be sold to the right client at a profit. In fact, Fugger already had Emperor Maximilian I in mind as a buyer when he purchased the Brothers, but the Emperor balked at Fugger's exorbitant asking price and bought everything on offer, but not the pendant.

The jewel stayed with the Fuggers for several decades. When Johann Jakob Fugger commissioned a history of the House of Habsburg in 1555, the Three Brothers were still described as a "treasure known to all Christendom" that the Fuggers had owned. However, Jakob Fugger's nephew Anton Fugger, who was now running the family business, had decided to liquidate part of the family's possessions by the 1540s. He first unsuccessfully offered the Brothers to King Ferdinand I and Emperor Charles V, while a bid from the Ottoman Sultan Suleiman the Magnificent was refused because Anton did not want the jewel to fall into non-Christian hands.

When continental Christian kings could not be convinced to buy the jewel, the Fuggers turned to King Henry VIII, who had been conferred the title 'Defender of the Faith' in 1521. As a renaissance monarch, Henry was expected to live in grandeur, and the King consequently had a passion for jewels: between 1529 and 1532, Henry spent almost £11,000 on jewellery (equivalent to around £8 million in 2025). As early as 1544, a letter from the Fugger office in Antwerp mentioned the imminent departure of an employee with jewels to be sold to Henry. However, negotiations dragged on until Henry died in 1547, and were only concluded in May 1551 under his successor, the 14-year-old Edward VI. In his diary, the King wrote that he was forced to buy the jewel from "Anthony Fulker" (Anton Fugger) for the princely sum of 100,000 crowns because the monarchy owed the Fuggers' bank £60,000 (equivalent to around £25 million in 2025). The transaction was recorded in an update to the Inventory of Henry VIII of England, after which the Brothers became part of the Crown Jewels of England.

== As an English crown jewel ==
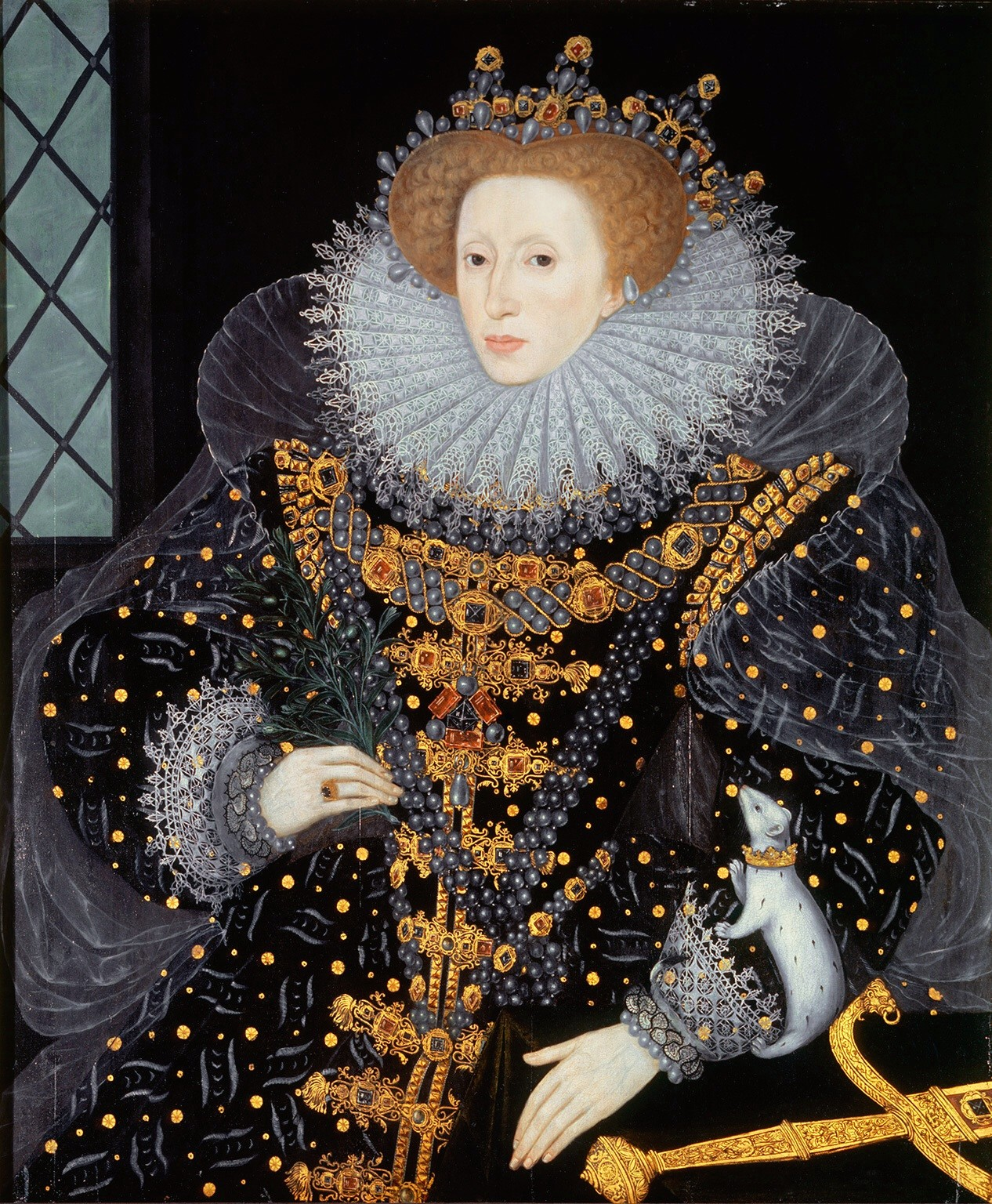
Elizabeth I wearing the jewel in the Ermine Portrait, c. 1585

Edward left the pendant with his Lord High Treasurer William Paulet for safekeeping on 7 June 1551, where it remained for the following years. When Edward died after a six-year reign, the Brothers were inherited by his half-sister Mary on her accession as Queen in July 1553. The jewel is described in a list of items delivered to Mary on 20 September 1553 as "a great pendant bought of the Fuggers in Flanders having three large ballaces set without fault, one large pointed diamond and four large pearls, whereof one hangs underneath", (Note: "a great pendounte bought of the ffowlkers in fflaunders havinge three lardge ballaces set without foyle, one lardge pointed diamounte and iiij lardge perles, whereof one is pendaunte.") which indicates that it had seen very few, if any, alterations since John the Fearless had commissioned it more than 150 years earlier. At the time of Mary's accession, German historian Peter Lambeck—grandson of Johann Jakob Fugger—wrote of his hope that her marriage to Philip II of Spain would bring the Three Brothers back into possession of the Habsburgs and to the continent, but this did not come to pass. After a reign of only five years, Mary died in 1558.

The jewel made a re-appearance during the reign of her successor Elizabeth I. Much like her father Henry VIII, Elizabeth knew when and how to use ostentatious displays of wealth and evidently liked the showy red-and-white piece of jewellery with the unusual triangular arrangement. The Queen wore it as part of her crown jewels on several occasions, and it is prominently featured in at least two portraits of her. First, in the Ermine Portrait (c. 1585, today in Hatfield House) attributed to William Segar or George Gower, in which the Brothers appear suspended from a massive, pearl-studded carcanet or necklace, dramatically offset against a black dress. And second, on the lesser known Portrait of Queen Elizabeth I (c. 1585-1590) by an unknown painter, originally given to the Navarrese diplomat François de Civille, where the pendant takes pride of place as the only significant piece of jewellery worn against a richly decorated white dress. Elizabeth died in 1603 at the end of a 45-year reign, by which time the jewel had become so tied to her persona that when a marble monument to her was erected in Westminster Abbey in 1606, a replica of the Brothers was made part of her tomb effigy; the element was fully restored in 1975.

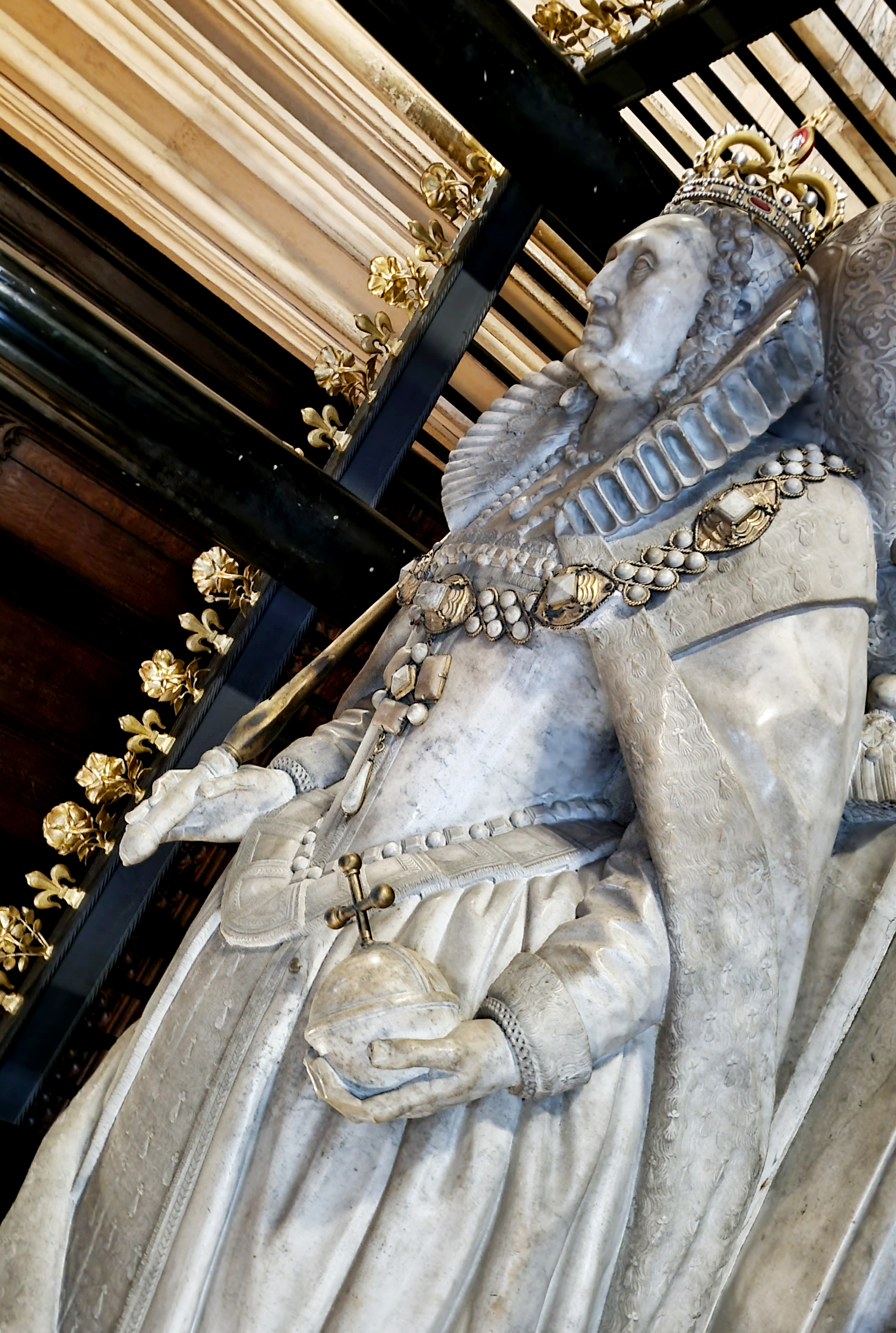
Tomb effigy of Elizabeth I in Westminster Abbey, with the Three Brothers on her chest

On Elizabeth's death, the jewel passed to her successor, James I, who had ruled in Scotland as James VI until his accession. In 1606 the Three Brothers were listed in an inventory of the monarch's possessions amongst those jewels "never to be alienated from the Crown". The pendant was a favourite of James, who re-fashioned it into a hat jewel. A portrait of James produced around 1605 by court painter John de Critz shows the Brothers in great detail as the King wore it with a pearl-studded band on a black hat. He wore other crown jewels in a similar fashion, such as the Mirror of Great Britain.

Towards the end of James' reign, the jewel was reset, possibly for the first time since its creation. In 1623, James' son and heir apparent Charles was sent on an incognito mission to Spain to negotiate a marriage between himself and the Infanta Maria Anna of Spain in a diplomatic maneuver known as the Spanish match. Opulent jewellery was to be brought on the trip in an attempt to impress Philip III of Spain and convince him to give his daughter's hand in marriage. Crown jeweller George Heriot worked four days and nights to reset the chosen pieces of jewellery, with a report on 17 March stating that he had taken "the great pointed diamond [...] out of the jewell called the Brethren, which he commendeth to be the most compleat stone that ever he sawe" and which he valued at £7,000 on its own (equivalent to around £1.48 million in 2025). James wrote Charles on the same day that he would "send you for youre wearing the Three Brethren that you knowe full well, but newlie sette".

== Later history and loss ==
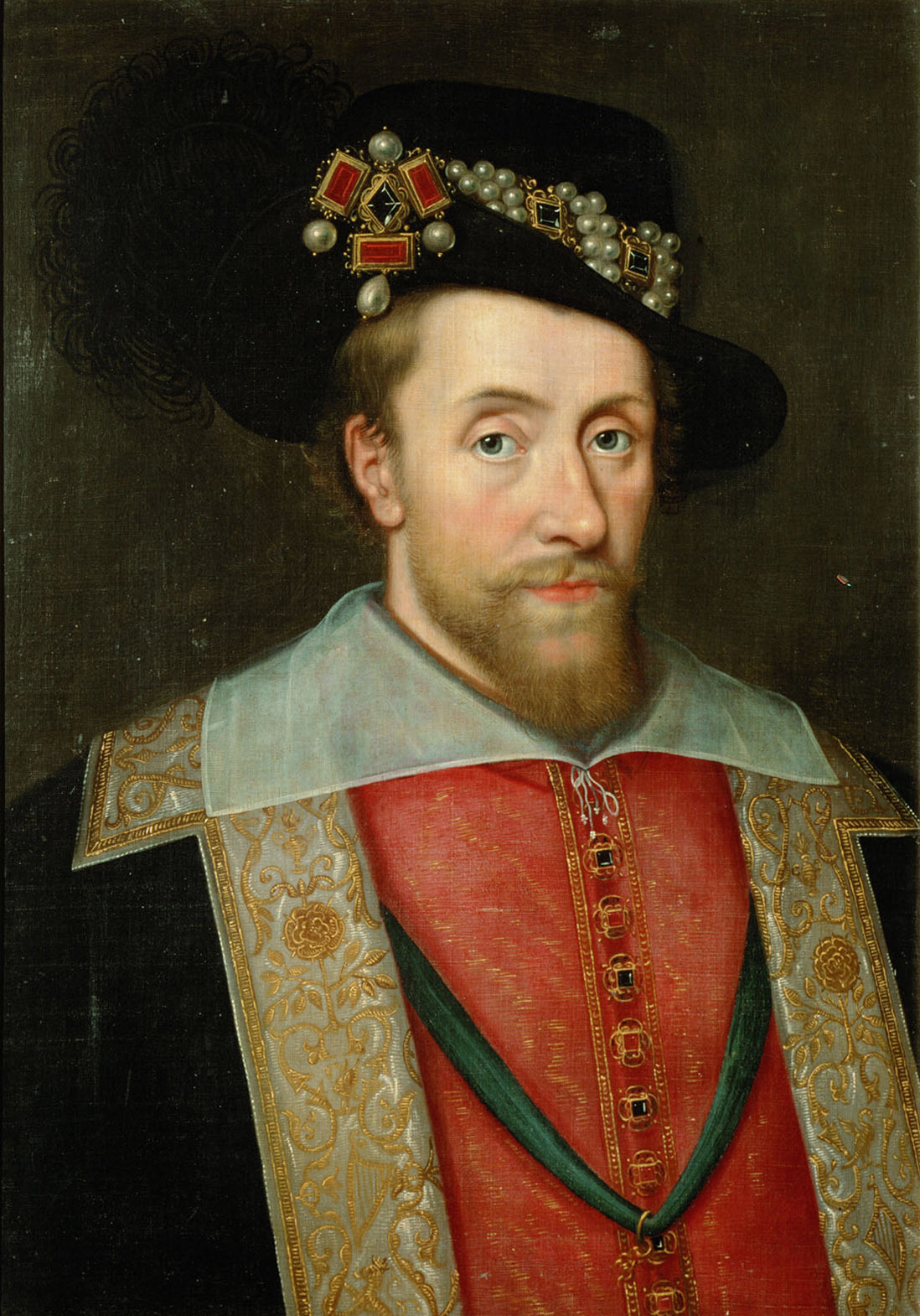
James VI and I wearing the Three Brothers on his hat, c. 1605

When the Spanish match failed to materialise and James died in March 1625, the newly crowned Charles I instead married French princess Henrietta Maria. The jewel was delivered into the keeping of the courtiers Lord Conway and Endymion Porter in November 1625. Charles continuously quarrelled with the Parliament of England during his reign; one bone of contention was the 'divine right of kings', which led him to consider the crown jewels as his personal possessions.

Plagued by financial problems, in 1628 Charles pawned away the Brothers and several other jewels to two Italian financiers operating in the Dutch Republic, Philip Burlamachi and Philip Calandrini, in a transaction totalling about 200,000 crowns. The jewel was with Francis Vanhoven of Amsterdam in 1634, and Charles was finally able to redeem it in 1639.

When the monarchy faced bankruptcy in mid-1640, Charles sent Henrietta to the continent to sell what she could of the crown jewels. The Queen arrived in The Hague on 11 March 1642 despite the protestations of Parliament that she had taken with her "Treasure, in Jewels, Plate, and ready Money" that was likely to "impoverish the State" and be used to forment unrest in Britain. However, Henrietta found that potential buyers were hesitant to touch important pieces such as the Three Brothers, writing to her husband: "The money is not ready, for on your jewels, they will lend nothing. I am forced to pledge all my little ones". By June, Sir Walter Erle reported to Parliament that the Brothers were still unsold.

It is at the end of Henrietta's trip in 1643 that the trail of the jewel began to disappear. There is no record of her selling or pawning the pendant in the Netherlands, and it is likely that the Brothers returned with her to England. As the country descended into the First English Civil War between Charles and Parliament, Henrietta fled to Paris in 1644, where she again immediately attempted to raise funds. Once more the local market showed little interest, but in early 1645, she succeeded in selling an unnamed piece of jewellery for the comparatively low price of 104,000 guilders. The piece was described as a "pyramidal diamond, 3 balas rubies, 4 pearls with the addition of a table cut diamond of 30 carats and two pointed diamonds", which closely matches the original description of the Three Brothers if it had been altered by adding smaller diamonds. However, there is no definite proof that this was the same item. A contemporary letter to Henrietta's secretary identifies two Hague jewellers and gemstone dealers, Thomas Cletcher and Joachim de Wicquefort, as possible middlemen or buyers of the unnamed jewel. Cletcher, who would later become court jeweller to Frederick Henry, Prince of Orange, had already been involved in the pawning of the Mirror of Great Britain in 1625 and would therefore have been familiar to Charles and Henrietta.

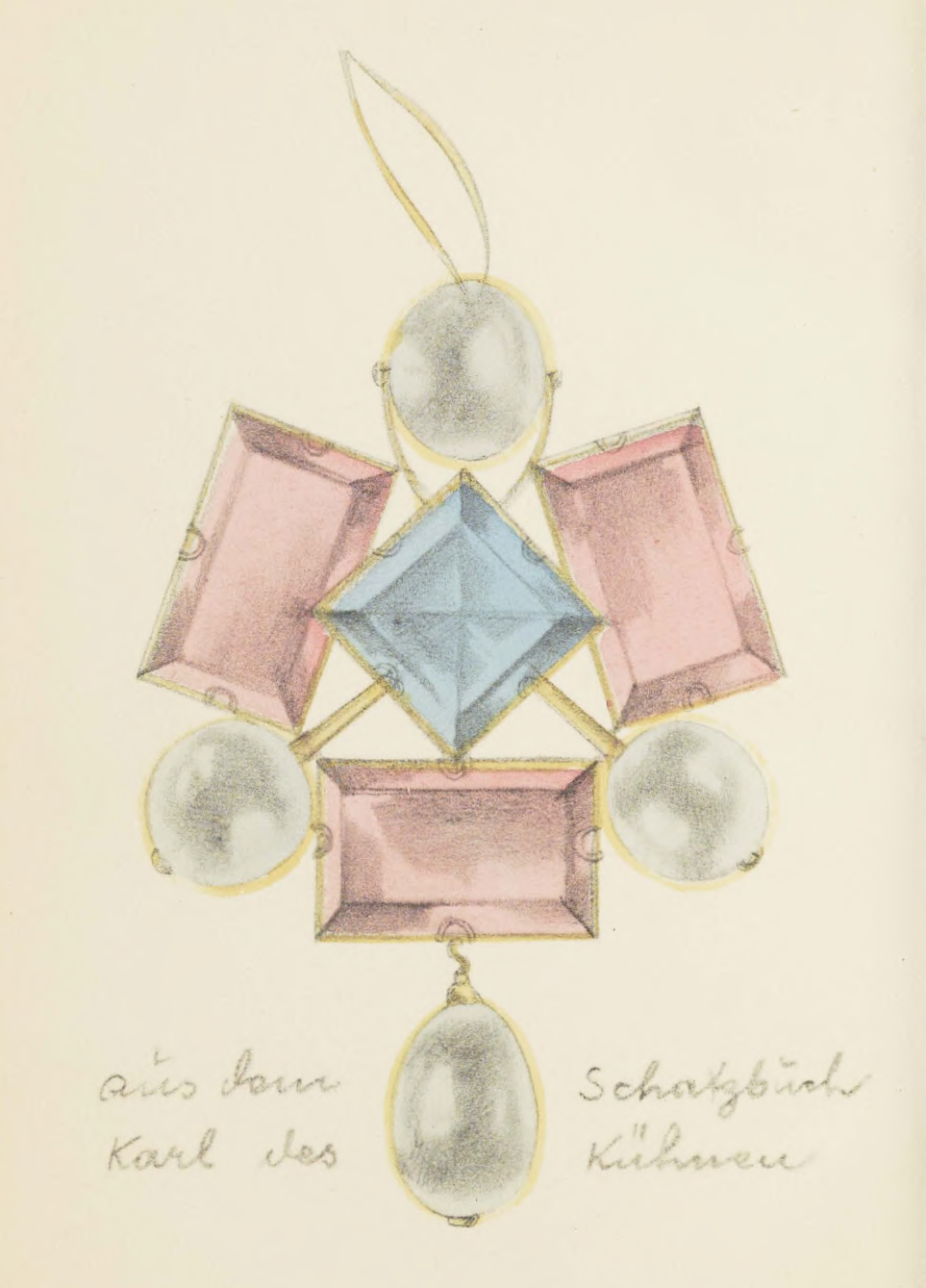
Drawing of the "Three Brothers" by German goldsmith Emil Lettré (1922), likely based on the Basel miniature

The fate of the Brothers after 1645 is unknown. It has been suggested that the jewel was broken up, or bought by French chief minister Cardinal Mazarin, a renowned jewel collector to whom Henrietta Maria was deeply indebted. There has also been speculation that the pendant was modified, creating a jewel called the Three Sisters in the process. The Sisters were offered to Prince Frederick Henry around the time of Henrietta's sale in 1645. However, besides the possibly coincidental similarity in naming, there is no hard evidence to suggest that the Brothers became the Sisters. There has been no confirmed sighting of the jewel since.

== In literature ==
Tobias Hill published the novel The Love of Stones in 2001, which charts the lives of several real and fictional persons coming in contact with the Three Brothers.

== See also ==
- Beau Sancy diamond—also pawned through Thomas Cletcher
- Florentine Diamond—once-lost jewel also thought to originate with Charles the Bold
- List of diamonds
- List of missing treasures
