= Beau Sancy =

Historic 35 carat diamond of faint brown color

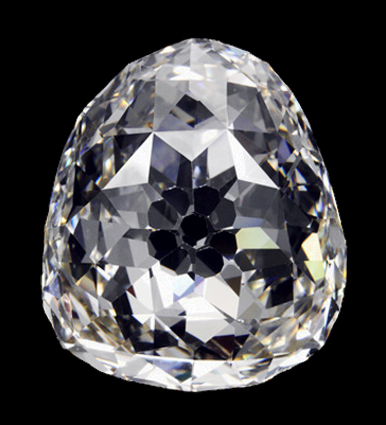
- Copy of the Beau Sancy
- Weight: 34.98 carats (6.996 g)
- Color: Faint brown (GIA)
- Cut: Modified pear double rose
- Country of origin: India
- Mine of origin: Kollur mine
- Cut by: Unknown
- Original owner: Nicolas de Harlay, seigneur de Sancy
- Owner: Unknown
- Estimated value: >10 million USD

The Beau Sancy is a 34.98-carat (6.996 g) diamond originally mined in India, which is cut in a modified pear double rose-cut shape. Since appearing in Europe in the 16th century, the Beau Sancy has been owned by a number of European royal houses, among them the House of Medici and the kings of England and Prussia. After more than 300 years in the possession of the House of Hohenzollern, the diamond was sold in 2012 at Sotheby's auction in Geneva for $9.57 million to an anonymous buyer.

== History ==
The Beau Sancy comes from the famous diamond mines around Golconda, now in the Indian state of Telangana. Like its sibling diamond, the Sancy, it is part of the stones collectively known as the Golconda diamonds, which also include the Koh-i-Noor and the Hope Diamond. The Beau Sancy is sometimes also known as the 'Little Sancy' to better distinguish it from its larger sibling. It is unknown when the diamond first reached Europe, but the earliest record of its existence comes when it was acquired by French diplomat Nicolas de Harlay, seigneur de Sancy, most likely in Constantinople, where he was the French ambassador at the court of Sultan Selim II. When de Sancy faced financial difficulties in attempting to raise an army for Henry III of France, he was forced to sell off some of his jewels, among them both Sancy diamonds; the stones received their names after this sale in around 1589.

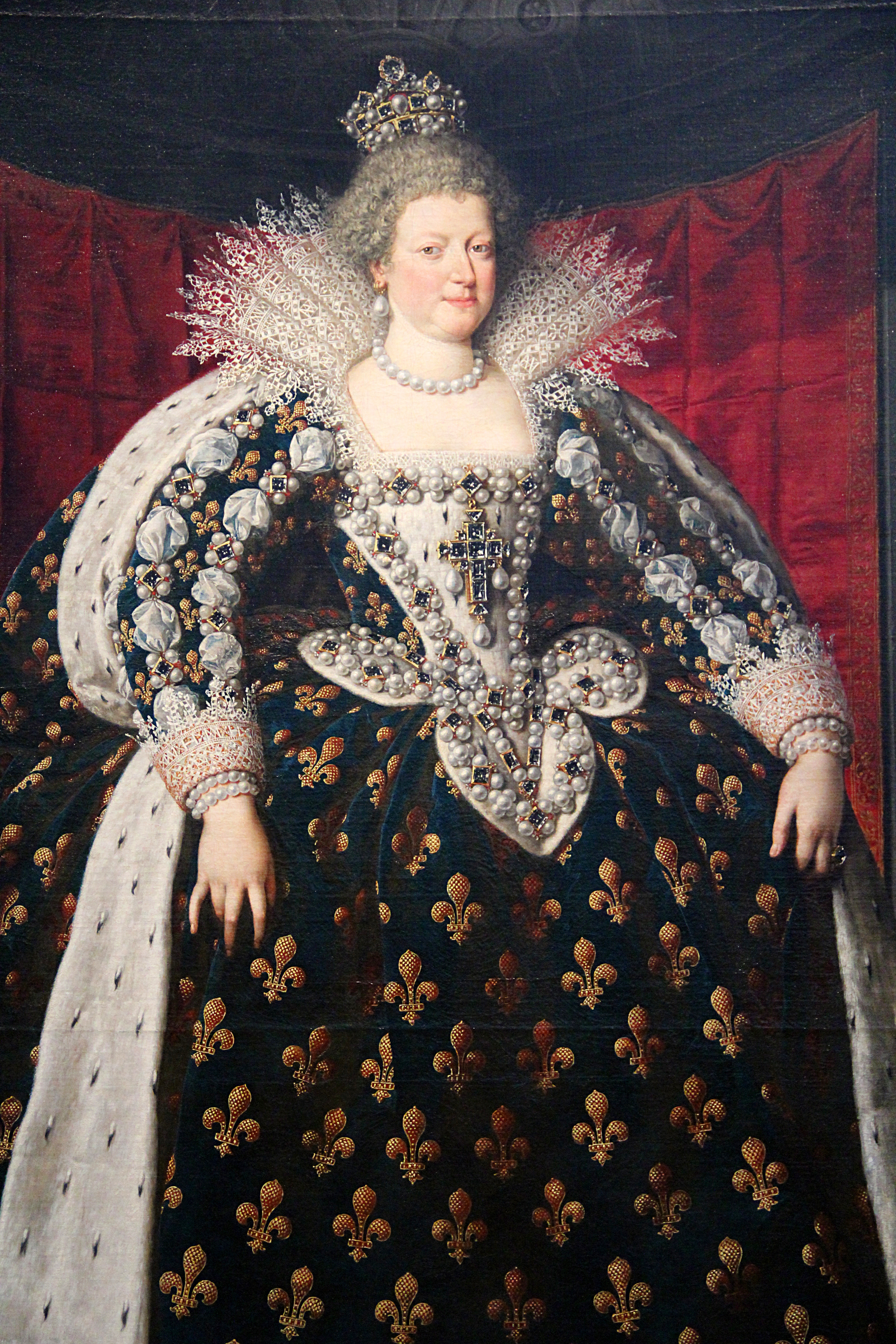
Coronation portrait of Marie de' Medici (1610)

At the same time, Marie de' Medici had been looking to acquire the largest diamonds she could find on the market. Besides being the heiress to the House of Medici and recipient of a massive fortune, Marie had also inherited a love of diamonds from her father, Francesco I de' Medici, Grand Duke of Tuscany. When de Sancy put his jewels up for sale, Marie saw her chance to buy the 55-carat Sancy, at the time the largest diamond that had ever reached the European market. However, she was outbid by King James VI and I, who used the Sancy in creating the Mirror of Great Britain. Not to be outdone, Marie hastened to acquire the 35-carat Beau Sancy instead, which was nominally gifted to her by her husband Henry IV of France in 1604. Marie had the stone set into the very top of a crown of pearls and diamonds for her coronation in the Basilica of Saint-Denis in 1610.

When Henry was assassinated shortly afterward, Marie became regent for her nine-year-old son Louis XIII, who then exiled her in 1617 due to her mismanagement and ceaseless political intrigues. Marie fled France in 1630, and would remain in exile in Cologne until her death in 1642. Despite her debts piling up, Marie managed to hold on to the Beau Sancy, but the stone eventually had to be sold to pay for her funeral and assorted other expenses.

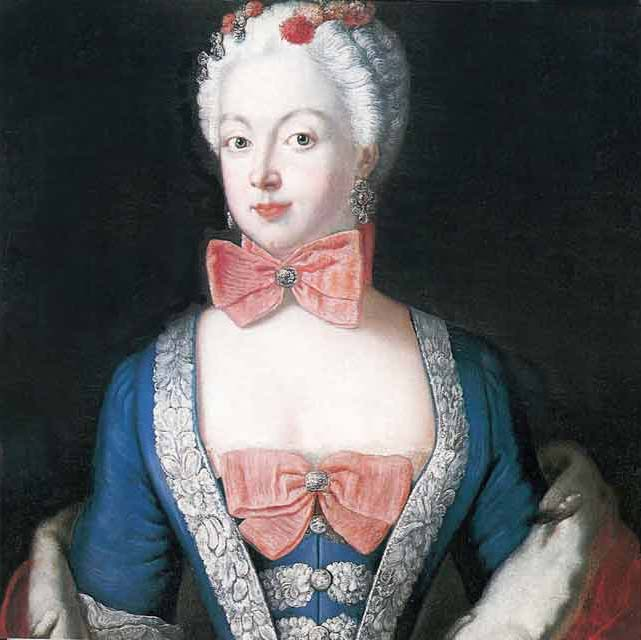
Elisabeth Christine with the Beau Sancy in a bow tie (1739)

The buyer was Frederick Henry, Prince of Orange, who acquired the diamond from an Amsterdam gem dealer for the sum of 80,000 florins. While this was undoubtedly a significant expense, court jeweller Thomas Cletcher assessed the stone's value at over 150,000 guilders, making the purchase a bargain. Frederick Henry intended the Beau Sancy as a gift for his new daughter-in-law, the 10-year-old Mary, Princess Royal, daughter of Charles I of England, who also happened to be the granddaughter of Marie de' Medici. The stone would remain with the House of Orange for the next years, but Mary pawned the Beau Sancy in 1659 to support her brother Charles II in his quest to regain the English crown for the House of Stuart. The Restoration being successful, Mary joined her brother in London, where she died in 1661 without having been able to redeem the Beau Sancy, or return her other jewellery from England. This task fell to her mother Amalia of Solms-Braunfels, who was able to solve the problem by arranging for her grandson William III to marry James' II daughter Mary, with the pair being crowned joint monarchs of England in the Glorious Revolution of 1688. The Beau Sancy thus became part of the Crown Jewels of the United Kingdom for the duration of William and Mary's reign. Mary predeceased William in 1694, and when the King died in 1702, the diamond passed back to the House of Orange, since the couple had been childless.

As the highest-ranking member of the House, Frederick I of Prussia claimed the jewel in 1702. Eager to emulate other absolutist monarchs after his self-elevation to the title of King in Prussia just one year earlier, Frederick considered the storied Beau Sancy to be the cornerstone of the Prussian Crown Jewels. Set in the center of a new crown, and worth a reputed 300,000 Reichsthaler, the diamond spoke to the self-made king's aspirations. In 1713, the jewel passed from Frederick to his son, the 'soldier king' Frederick William I, who in turn passed it to Frederick the Great in 1740. Frederick the Great famously abhored all signifiers of stylishness, and gave the stone to his wife Elisabeth Christine, who had the Beau Sancy reset in the Rococo style as a bouquet jewel. A painting of Elisabeth Christine by Antoine Pesne shows the diamond as the centerpiece of an elaborate pink bowtie.

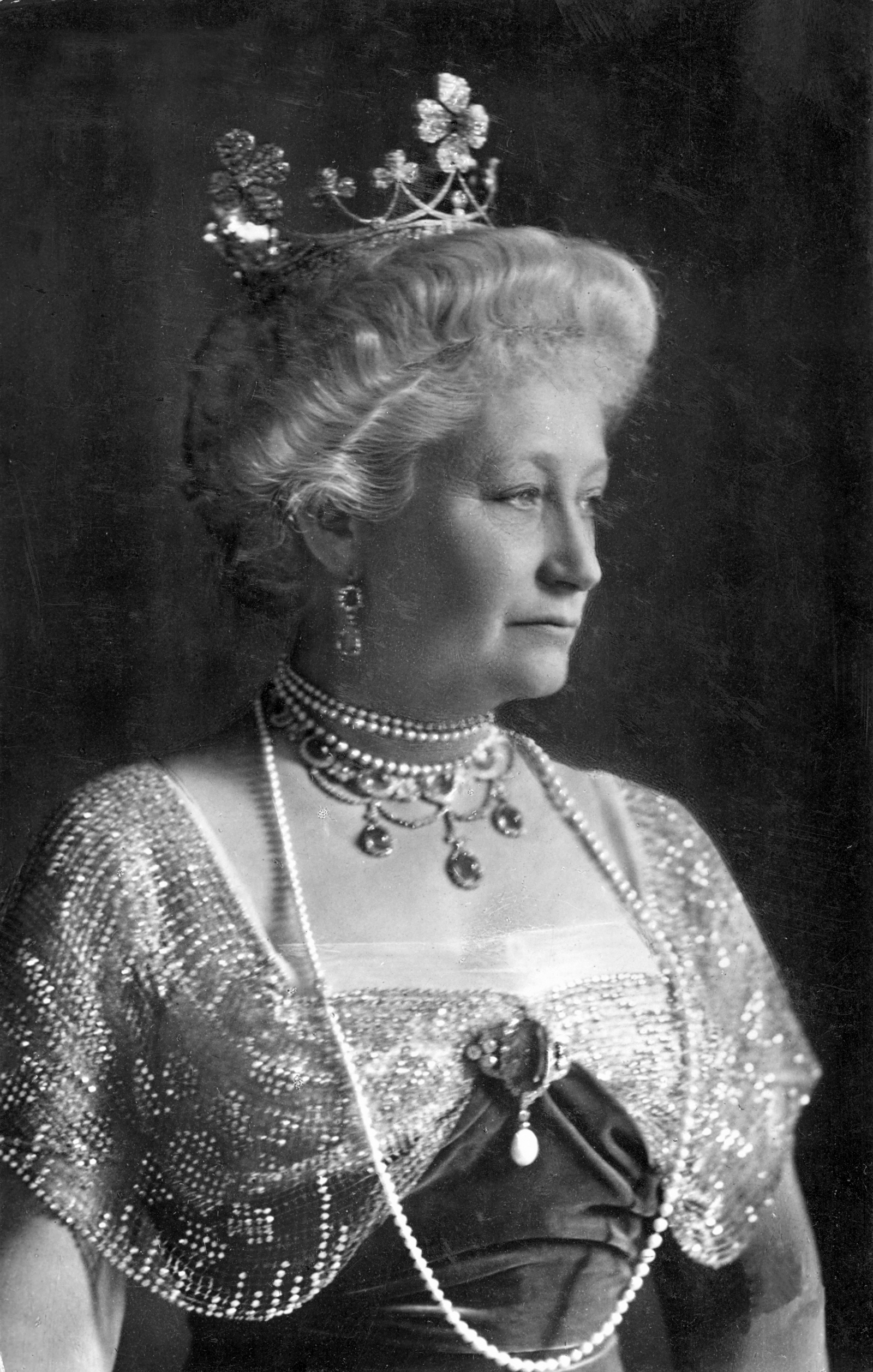
Empress Augusta Viktoria with the Beau Sancy as a breast ornament, 1913

The jewel remained in the possession of Prussia's ruling House of Hohenzollern for the next 179 years, surviving the 1806 invasion of Napoleon and seeing the rise of the kings of Prussia to become German emperors. The Beau Sancy retained its exalted position amongst the crown jewels, but was reset several times as a pendant, which it was customary for the bride to wear at royal weddings. The last Empress to wear the diamond was Augusta Victoria, wife of Wilhelm II. The last Kaiser abdicated the throne at the end of the First World War in 1918 and went into exile in the Netherlands, but the stone remained in Berlin. At the end of the Second World War, it was transferred to a bricked-up crypt for safe-keeping, where it was found by British troops and returned to the estate of the House of Prussia. In the decades following the war, the Beau Sancy was occasionally exhibited publicly. In 1972 it was shown in Helsinki together with its sibling diamond the Sancy, at which point the two diamonds had been separated for 370 years.

The jewel's story with the House of Hohenzollern ends in 2012, when it was put up for auction with Sotheby's by Georg Friedrich, Prince of Prussia. Although the pre-sale estimate had only been between $2–4 million, an eight-minute battle between five interested parties ensued, with the final bid of US$9.7 million (equivalent to about $13.3M in 2024) coming from an anonymous buyer.

== See also ==
- List of diamonds
