= Nicolas de Harlay, seigneur de Sancy =

French soldier and diplomat (1546–1629)

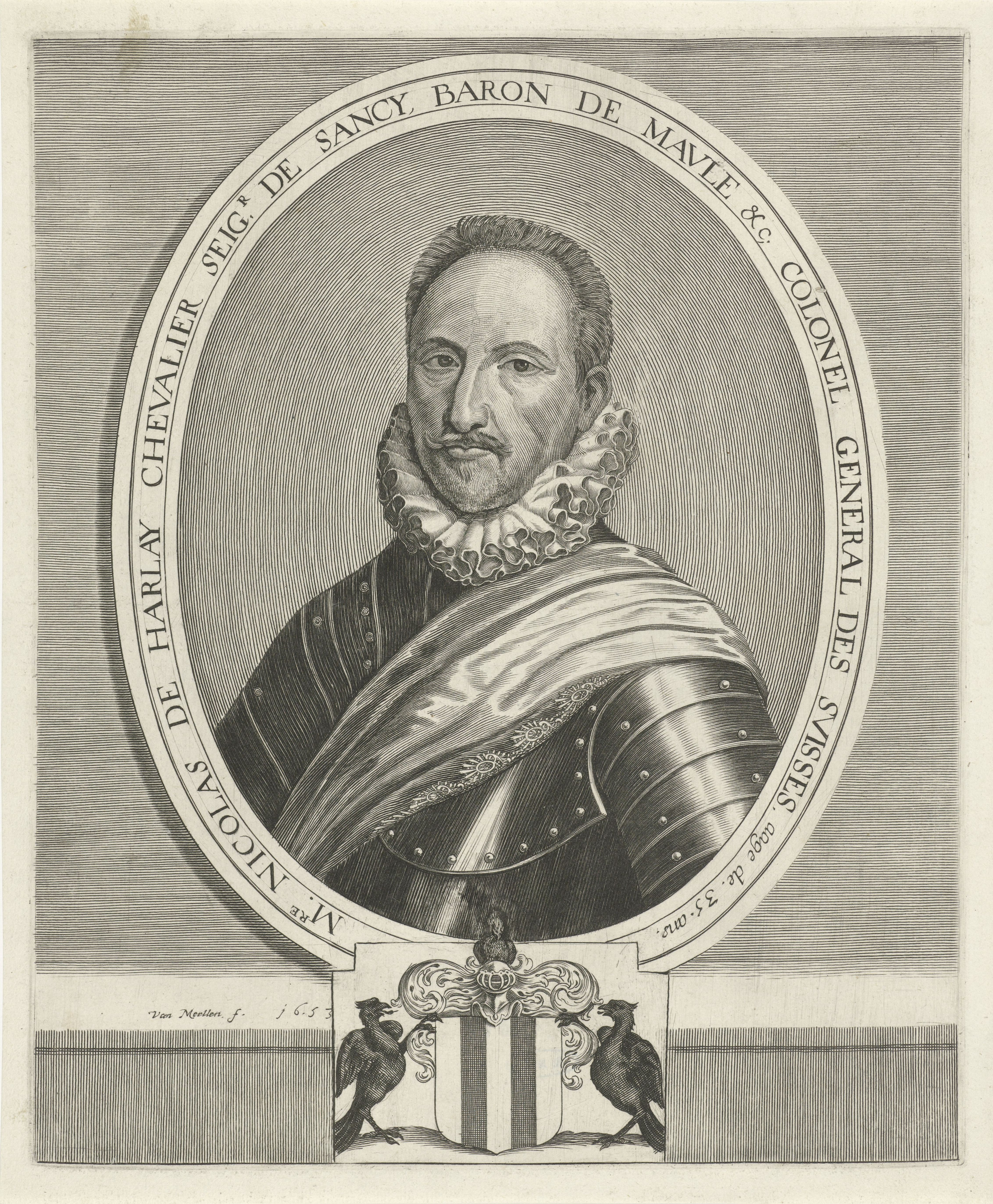
Nicolas de Harlay

Nicolas de Harlay, seigneur de Sancy (1546–1629) was a French soldier, diplomat, and gem collector.

== Life ==
Although Harlay belonged to the Protestant branch of the family of Harlay, he adopted the Catholic religion in 1572 during the massacres of the Huguenots. In the second half of the 16th century, de Harley served as the French ambassador at the court of Sultan Selim II in Constantinople, where he acquired a number of diamonds that had been mined near Golconda, now in the Indian state of Telangana. Among these jewels were some of the largest diamonds ever seen in Europe, such as the Sancy and its smaller sibling the Beau Sancy.

In 1589, Harlay obtained in Geneva and Bern sums sufficient to raise an army of mercenaries for Henry III, partly by the sale of a number of his jewels. Henry IV of France made him superintendent of his finances in 1594, but in 1599 he was replaced by Maximilien de Béthune, duc de Sully. Meanwhile he had been a second time converted to Catholicism, but his influence at court waned, and he retired from public life in 1605. He died on 13 October 1629, leaving a Discours sur l'occurrence des affaires. His son, Achille Harlay de Sancy (1581–1646), was bishop of Saint-Malo.

== Sancy diamonds ==
=== Sancy diamond ===
The Sancy is a pale yellow diamond of 55.23 carats (11.046 g) bought by de Harley around 1570, who had already acquired a reputation as a gem connoisseur. Facing financial difficulties, de Sancy was forced to sell the diamond to King James VI and I in March 1605 when it is thought the Sancy acquired its name. James paid the princely sum of 60,000 French crowns for the stone, which he subsequently reset into the Mirror of Great Britain with additional stones from the Great H of Scotland and wore as a hat jewel. It was described in the Tower of London's 1605 Inventory of Jewels as "...one fayre dyamonde, cut in fawcetts, bought of Sauncy." After a storied history, the Sancy today rests in the Galerie d'Apollon in the Louvre in Paris.

=== Beau Sancy diamond ===
The Beau Sancy is a 34.98-carat diamond cut in a modified pear double rose-cut shape. It is thought that de Harley bought the Beau Sancy at the same time as the larger Sancy. Like its sibling, the Beau Sancy was put up for sale by de Harley to raise funds, and subsequently bought by Marie de' Medici, later Queen of France. The jewel was later owned by the House of Orange, the Kings of England, and Kings of Prussia. After 370 years in the possession of the House of Hohenzollern, the diamond was sold in 2012 at Sotheby's auction in Geneva for $9.57 million to an anonymous buyer.
