= Harlay =

Harlay is a French surname. Notable people with the surname include:

- Nicolas de Harlay, seigneur de Sancy (1546–1629)
- Christophe de Harlay, Count of Beaumont (1570–1615) French ambassador to England
- Achille Harlay de Sancy (1581–1646)
- François II de Harlay Archbishop of Rouen (1614–1651)
- François de Harlay de Champvallon (1651–1695)
