= Philip Burlamachi =

British banker (1575–1644)

Philip Burlamachi (1575 – 1644) was a major financial intermediary of King Charles I of England, and is remembered as the inventor of the concept of a central bank.

Burlamachi was born Sedan, France. His family was of Italian origin, exiled descendants of the Lucchese Francesco Burlamacchi. He is known to have been in England for at least 30 years (since at least 1605) where he became naturalised by an Act of Parliament.

In 1621, Burlamachi acted on behalf of the City of London Merchants, collecting money from foreign merchants and transferring it to the Privy Council; "Whereas you have undertaken the collecting of such moneys as were thought reasonable and meet for the merchants strangers residing within the City of London and the outports, to contribute towards the expedition against pirates." He was entrusted the sum of £30,000 on behalf of the Privy Council with bills of exchange for the service of an army for the States of the United Provinces or 'direct the employment them as he shall think'.

He worked extensively with his brother in law Philip Calandrini who was his financial representative in Amsterdam. In 1626 Burlamachi and Calandrini offered to stand as guarantor for £58,400 for Charles I.

Burlamachi proposed the idea of a national clearing bank. This is the first known proposal for a central bank, where the word bank is first used for "a bank for the payment of all large sums of which shall be negotiated". He did concede "the proposal has been formerly made." The idea was originally discussed in the year 1636 and 58 years later, in 1694, the Bank of England was first formed.

Burlamachi is also known for financing the East India Company. and as Postmaster of Foreign posts from 1637 to 1642.

During the Anglo-French War (1627-1629), Burlamachi loaned Charles I the sum of £70,000. Burlamachi was involved in schemes with Philip Calandrini to raise loans for Charles on the security of royal jewels, including the "Three Brothers". The king's inability to repay Burlamachi caused him to go bankrupt in England in 1633.
