= Mirror of Great Britain =

17th-century English crown jewel

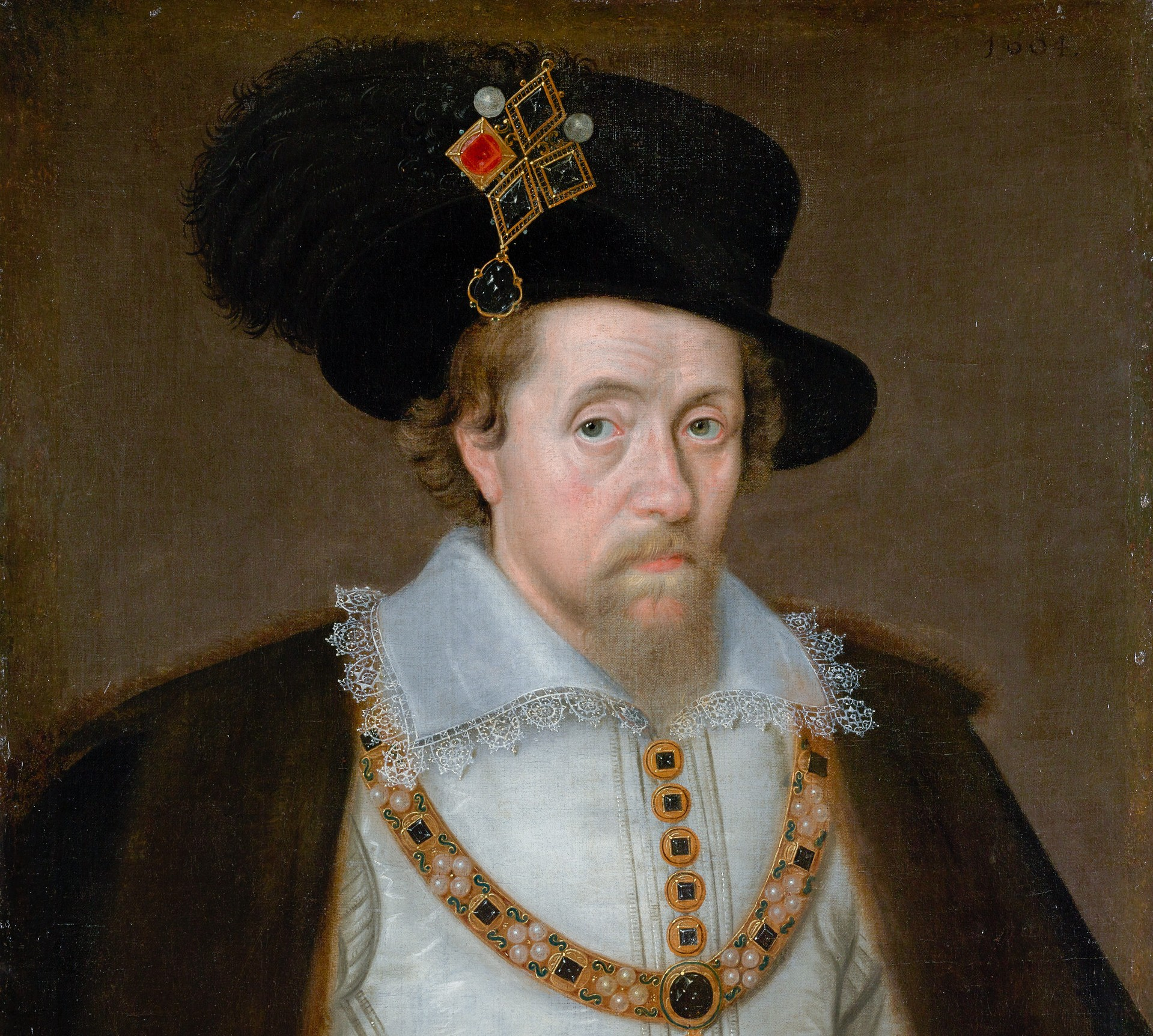
James I and VI wearing the Mirror of Great Britain on his hat, 1604

The Mirror of Great Britain was a piece of jewellery that was part of the Crown Jewels of the United Kingdom during the reign of King James VI and I. It was pawned in 1625 and is considered lost.

== Description ==
The jewel was described in a 1606 inventory as follows:

Item, a greate and riche jewell of gould called the MIRROR OF GREAT BRITTAINE, containing one very faire table diamonde, one very faire table rubie, two other diamonds cut lozengwise, the one of them called the stone of the letter H. of SCOTLANDE, garnished with small diamonds, two rounde pearles fixed, and one fayre diamond cut in fawcetts, bought of Sancy."

The National Galleries of Scotland collection includes a 1604 portrait by John de Critz of James wearing the Mirror of Great Britain as a hat jewel. He wore and was painted wearing other jewels in a similar fashion, such as the Three Brothers, and a "feather" of gold set with diamonds.

== History ==
When Queen Elizabeth I died in 1603 after a 45-year reign, she was the last direct descendant of King Henry VIII, and the 'virgin queen' had been unmarried and childless. King James VI of Scotland seemed to have the best claim on the throne through his great-grandmother Margaret Tudor, and from as early as 1601, English politicians had maintained a secret correspondence with James to prepare for the succession. When James VI ascended to the thrones of England and Ireland as James I in 1603, he was the first monarch to realise the promise of the 1502 Treaty of Perpetual Peace, which had brought the Scottish House of Stuart into the line of succession of the English House of Tudor.

To mark the momentousness of the occasion of this "Union of the Crowns", several pieces of art were commissioned, chief among them the Mirror. The jewel was created around 1603 by an unknown master craftsman – possibly the best-known of James's goldsmiths, Scotsman George Heriot, who had followed the king from Edinburgh to London. To assemble the pieces of the Mirror, James had likely ordered existing Elizabethan jewellery to be broken up.

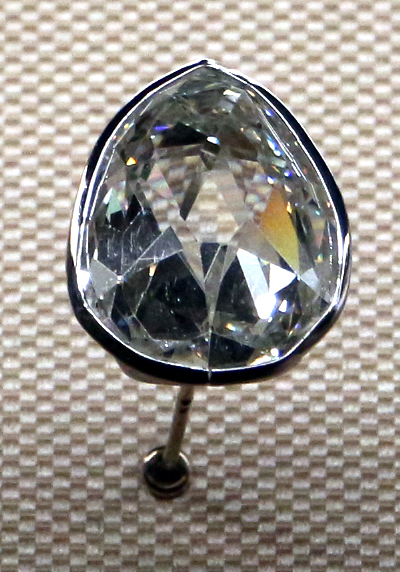
The Sancy diamond, now in the Louvre

The jewel was created in gold with five main stones set into it: four pale diamonds and a red ruby. The ruby and one of the diamonds were table-cut, while two further diamonds were lozenges. One of them was known as the Great H of Scotland or the Great Harry and had belonged to James's mother, Mary, Queen of Scots, who had been gifted the stone by Henry II of France. The final stone – dangling underneath the four other jewels, as can be seen in the 1604 painting – was the Sancy diamond. The Sancy had originally belonged to Charles the Bold, Duke of Burgundy, just like the Three Brothers, another of James' crown jewels. The diamond had acquired its name when it was bought in the 16th century by French diplomat Nicolas de Harlay, seigneur de Sancy, who eventually sold it to James. The Mirror was also decorated with two large pearls and a number of smaller diamonds. A contemporary source estimated the total cost of the Mirror at over £70,000. James would typically wear the piece as a hat jewel, with the ruby at the nine o'clock position to the left of the diamonds.

When James died in March 1625, the jewel passed to his son Charles I. In his decades-long struggle with the Parliament of England that would ultimately lead to the First English Civil War, Charles continuously asserted the divine right of kings, which meant personal ownership of crown jewels such as a Mirror. Plagued by financial difficulties, in 1625 Charles took the drastic step to pawn away several important items of jewellery in the Netherlands, most likely in The Hague, one of the centres of the jewel trade. While Charles managed to eventually scrape together enough money to redeem certain jewels some 14 years later in 1639, the same could not be said for the Mirror. The jewel was likely sold to Hague jeweller and gemstone dealer Thomas Cletcher, who recorded an item very similar to the Mirror in his sketchbook with the note that it had been "commissioned by Coninc Jacobus". The theory is bolstered by the fact that it was also Cletcher who again acted as middleman or buyer when Charles's wife Henrietta Maria attempted to sell off even more of the crown jewels in 1644.

The Mirror's journey as a distinct piece of jewellery ends after the sale, however. It was split up and its constituent stones sold or re-used. The two remaining pearls were appraised by Philip Jacobson in June 1629, and sold off in 1630 by James Maxwell, a groom of the bedchamber. The Sancy diamond was the only piece of the Mirror to ever be reclaimed, but it was eventually pawned again by Charles's son James II, after which it became part of the French Crown Jewels. The Sancy is now in the collection at the Louvre in Paris.
