= Achille de Harlay de Sancy =

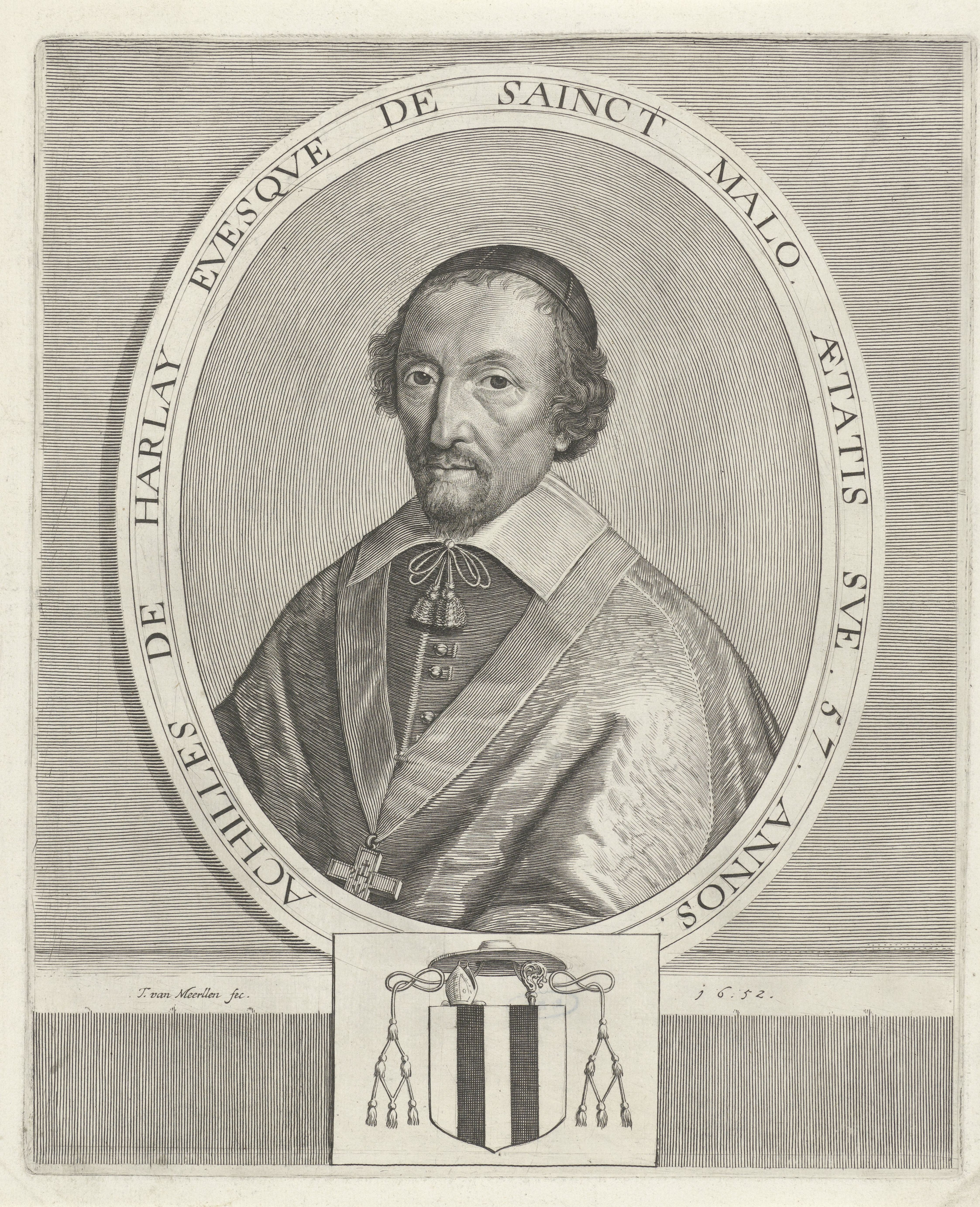
Achille Harlay de Sancy

Achille de Harlay de Sancy, CO (1581, Paris – 26 November 1646), the son of Nicolas de Harlay, seigneur de Sancy, was a French diplomat and intellectual who was noted as a linguist and orientalist. He entered Church service, becoming the Bishop of Saint-Malo.

== Life ==
Harlay was educated for a career in the Roman Catholic Church, but, though he remained a friend to his fellow pupil Armand-Jean du Plessis, who became Cardinal Richelieu, he resigned his vocation to become a soldier after the death of his elder brother in 1601. For several years, from 1610 to 1619, he was French Ambassador to the Ottoman Empire, where he amassed a fortune of some 16,000 sterling by doubtful means, and was bastinadoed by order of Sultan Mustafa I for his frauds. One of his secretaries, named Lefevre, wrote a manuscript Voyage de M. de Sancy, ambassadeur pour le Roi en Levant, fait par terre depuis Raguse jusques à Constantinople l'an 1611.

On his return to France, Harlay joined the French Oratory and became a priest. When François de Bassompierre was sent to England in 1627 to regulate the differences between Queen Henrietta Maria of France and her husband King Charles I of England, Harlay de Sancy was attached to the queen's ecclesiastical household, but the king secured his dismissal.

Harlay was named the Bishop of Saint-Malo in 1631, for which he was consecrated in January 1632. He served in this post until his resignation on 20 November 1646. He died six days later.
