= Great H of Scotland =

Jewel belonging to Mary, Queen of Scots

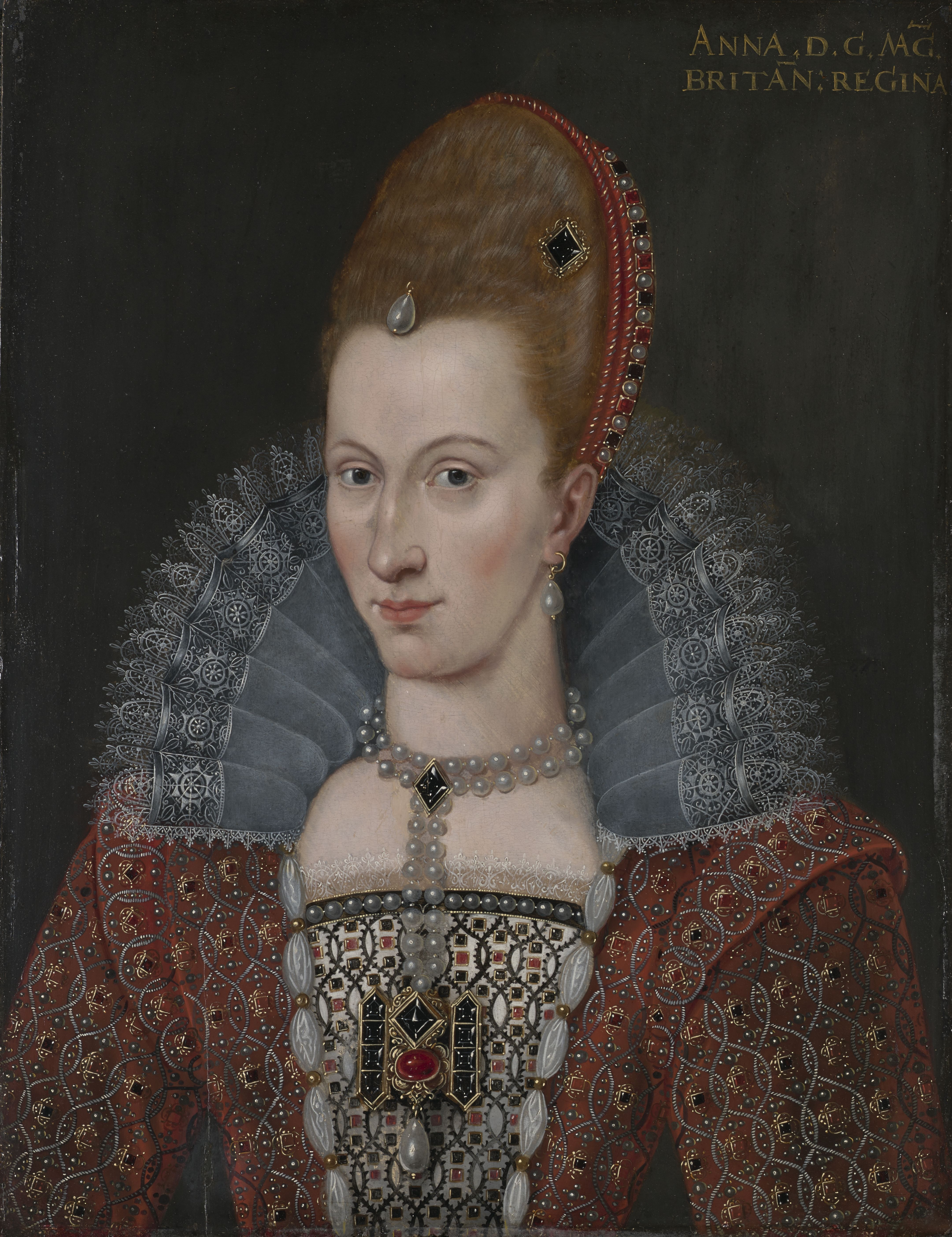
Anne of Denmark depicted wearing a jewel with a large diamond and a cabochon ruby, possibly the Great Harry or H of Scotland, GAC.

The Great 'H' of Scotland was a jewel belonging to Mary, Queen of Scots comprising a large diamond, a ruby, and a gold chain. Also known as the Great Harry, it was broken up in 1604 and made into the Mirror of Great Britain for James VI and I.

== Inventories of Mary Queen of Scots ==
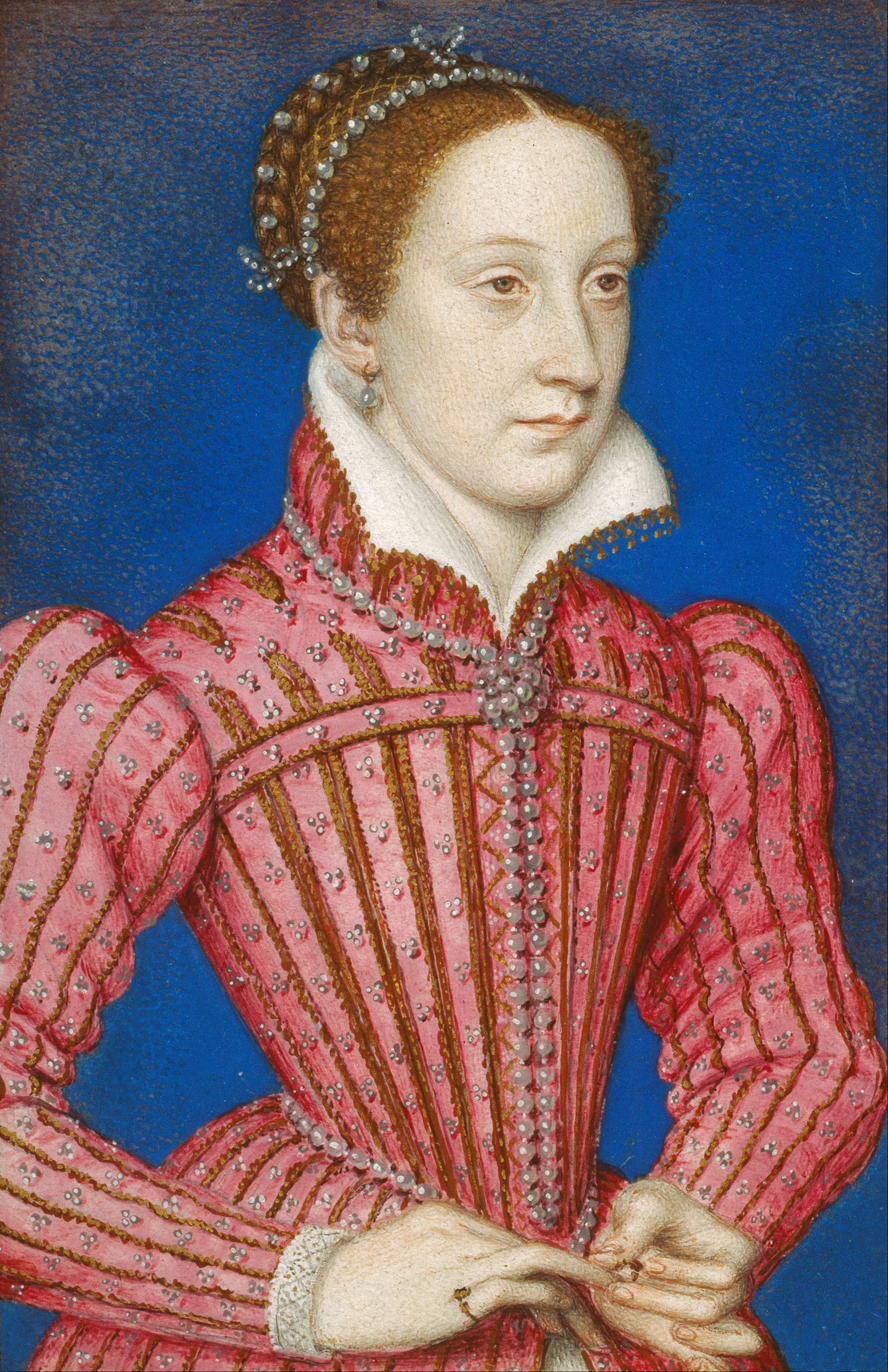
The Great H belonged to Mary, Queen of Scots, but does not appear in her surviving portraits

The "Great H" appears listed in inventories of jewels belonging to Mary, Queen of Scots. Two of its stones are usually mentioned, a large facetted lozenge diamond, and, hanging or set below, a large cabochon ruby. Mary's inventories refer to "Le Henri", and it was described in French as:

Une grosse bague a pendre facon de .h. en laquelle y a ung gros diamant a lorenge taille a face et dessoubz ung gros rubiz chabochon garniz d'une petitte chesne

A large pendant jewel made as an "h" in which there is a large diamond lozenge facet cut and beneath a large cabochon ruby, fitted with a small chain.

== Wedding at Notre-Dame ==
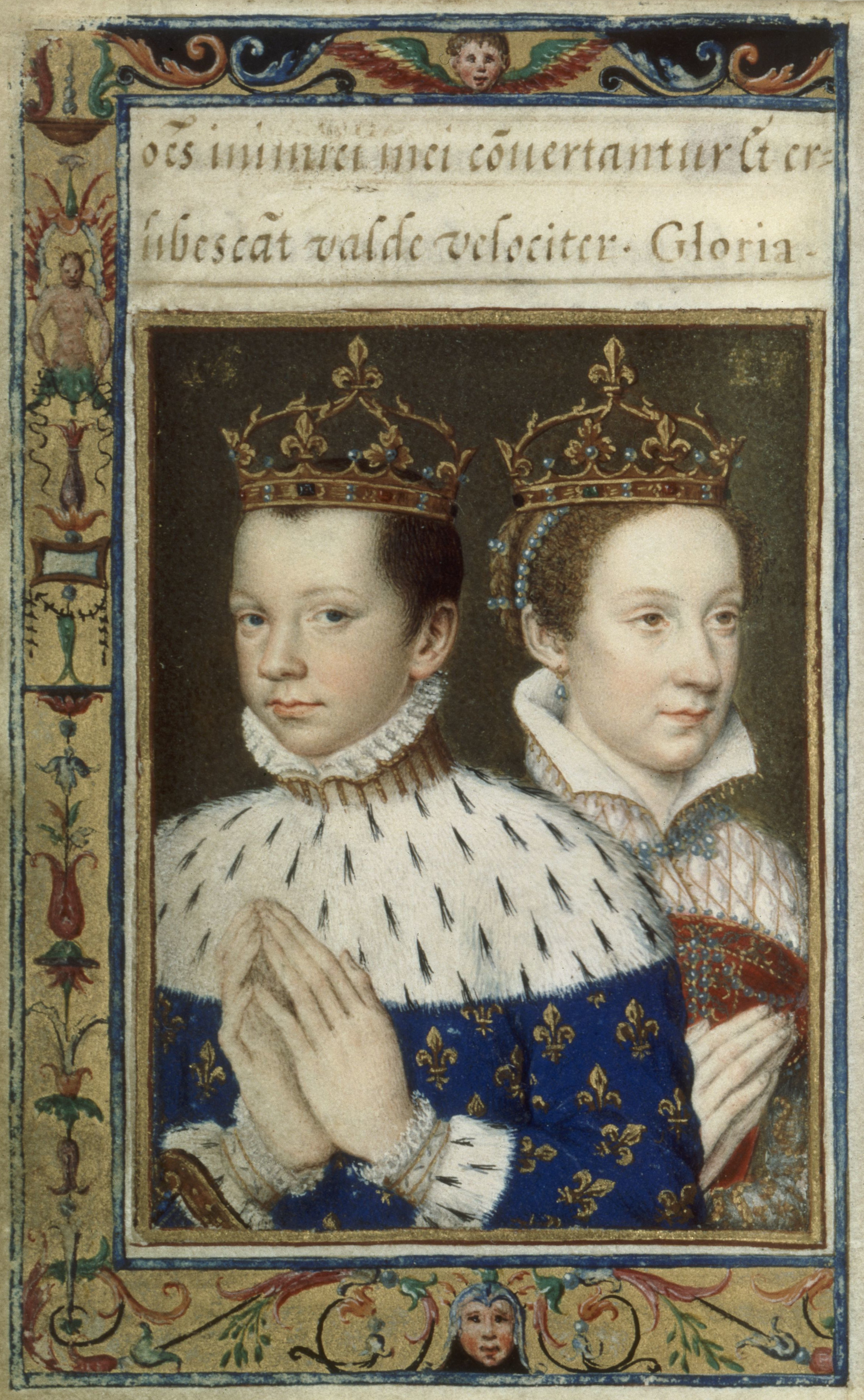
Francis II of France and Mary, Queen of Scots

The Great H may have been the pendant of "incalculable value" which Mary wore at her wedding in 1558 at Notre-Dame de Paris, "a son col pendoit une bague d'une valeur inestimable". Catherine de' Medici bought a diamond for Mary's necklace for her espousal and wedding day from Pierre Vast and Michel Fauré, two merchants from Lyon, for 380 livres, while Jehan Joly supplied a cabochon ruby for the necklace, costing 292 livres. Claude Héry sold Catherine nine large pearls for Mary's necklace, costing 671 livres. Mary's goldsmith, Mathurin Lussault, may have assembled this jewel for the bride. Accounts of the day also highlight a ruby called the "Egg of Naples" serving as a pendant at the front of her crown, an "escharboucle" thought to be worth 500,000 Écu or more.

== In Scotland ==
Scottish inventories mention the great diamond and ruby of Mary's "H", with an associated small gold chain. Mary was allowed to keep this jewel after the death of her husband Francis II of France in 1561 and brought it to Scotland. She had to return the Egg of Naples and other pieces regarded as French crown jewels.

In 1562, the "Great H" was included in an inventory with Mary's pendant jewels, her bacques a pandre. In 1578, the Great 'H' was described in Scots as:

The jowell callit the greit Hary with the letter H contening a grit diament and a grit ruby.

The jewel, as its name suggests, may have been a present from Henri II of France and Catherine de' Medici, and a similar jewel was listed in an inventory of French crown jewels made in 1551, a red-enamelled and diamond-set letter "H" with a cabochon ruby below. It has sometimes been suggested the Great H was a gift from Henry VII to Margaret Tudor, mother of James V of Scotland. James V, Mary's father, owned a different 'H' jewel, a hat badge with a ruby and two figures with the letter 'H', possibly a gift from Henry VIII of England, or a jewel formerly belonging to Margaret Tudor.

Mary hoped to add the "Great H" to the crown jewels of Scotland in memory of her reign (and her French marriage), in a list of potential bequests she made in childbed at Edinburgh Castle in 1566.

Une grosse bacque a pandre facon de / h / en laquelle y a ung groz diamant taille a faces et au dessus ung groz rubiz cabochin garny dune petitte chesne.
Je veulx quelle soys ioint a la Couronne de ce pays pat un acte pour memoyre de moys et du lieu dou je layeue

A large pendant jewel made as an "h" in which there is a diamond cut in facets and below a large cabochon ruby garnished with a little chain
I wish this joined to the Crown of this country as an act in memory of me and the place where I got it.

Mary left a second lesser gold "H" which included a cabochon ruby and a pendant pearl to Lord Darnley.

== Regent Moray and Regent Morton ==
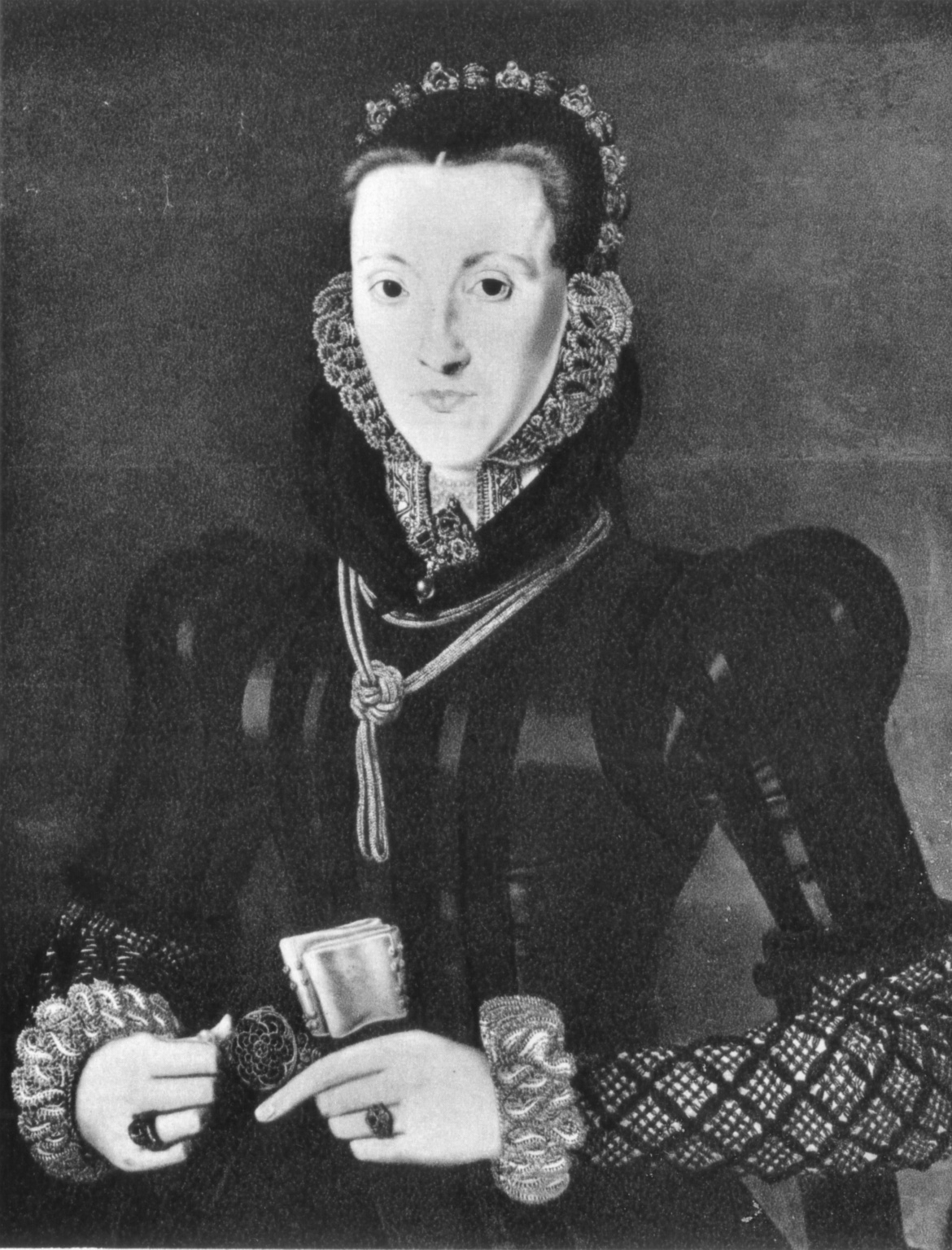
Agnes Keith, Countess of Moray, by Hans Eworth, Darnaway Castle

After Mary's abdication, her half-brother Regent Moray and his secretary John Wood brought the "H" with other jewels to England hoping to sell it. Moray's agent Nicolas Elphinstone sold Mary's pearls to Queen Elizabeth. After Regent Moray was assassinated by James Hamilton of Bothwellhaugh, his widow Agnes or Annas Keith retained the "H" for several years. In March 1570, William Kirkcaldy of Grange, who held Edinburgh Castle where most of Mary's jewels remained in a coffer, noted which jewels he thought she kept:

the Principall jowall callit the H quhilk me Lady Murray hes with xij of the fornamed Rubeis & dyamands with syndrie uthir jowalls as the belt of curell and syndrie uthir stuff that was in Servays keiping

(modernised) the principal jewel called the H which my Lady Moray has with 12 of the forenamed rubies and diamonds with sundry other jewels as the belt of coral and sundry other stuff that was in the keeping of Servais de Condé.

There is no evidence that Moray had given the jewel to his wife as a gift before his death, as the historians Agnes Strickland and Joseph Robertson supposed.

Mary Queen of Scots, and her agent or lieutenant, the Earl of Huntly, requested the Countess return the jewel to her. Mary wrote threateningly "so be sure, if you hold any thing pertains to me from me, you and your bairns (children) and maintainers shall feel my displeasure heavily, nor is wrongous gear profitable". Mary's political opponent in Scotland, Regent Lennox asked for the jewels that Moray had taken to England, and his successor, Regent Morton, asked for the jewels and the "H" on behalf of James VI.

Both the Queen's Party and the King's Party of the Marian Civil War wanted the "H" and other jewels in the countess' hands, including a belt of coral and twelve rubies and diamonds. Agnes Keith looked to England for help in this predicament. She wrote from Dunnotar on 2 November 1570 to William Cecil asking him to intercede with Queen Elizabeth so that Mary would cease from urging Huntly to trouble her and her children for the jewels. She claimed she had not known at first that the jewels were Mary's. She also wanted Elizabeth to write to Regent Lennox, asking him not to requisition the jewels. The English ambassador Thomas Randolph wrote to Cecil on her behalf, saying her friends advised her to yield to neither side. She later claimed that the value of the jewels was just recompense for the expenses her husband had made as Regent of Scotland.

=== Morton horns the Argylls ===
In 1572, Agnes Keith married Colin Campbell, and in 1573 she became the Countess of Argyll. Regent Morton recovered other royal jewels from those who had obtained them as pledges for loans. In February 1574, Morton's Privy Council declared that "Anna Keyth Countesse of Ergyle" still retained the "greit jowell in the forme of ane H set with dymontis" with other gems, and she and her husband had not brought the jewels to the council, and were to be "put to the horn". This was a Scottish legal sanction which could prevent landowners from collecting rents or selling goods. A messenger boy was sent to Dunoon Castle to summon the couple to appear before the council in Edinburgh. The Countess appealed against this action, arguing that the Parliament of Scotland had allowed that Regent Moray should have the jewels. The French ambassador in London, Bertrand de Salignac de la Mothe-Fénelon, reported this news in April, fearing armed conflict. The couple were proclaimed rebels at Edinburgh's Mercat Cross on 24 May.

Morton offered conditions to the Earl and Countess of Argyll in August 1574, and these were recorded in a note made by an English diplomat Henry Killigrew. In response to the correspondence of the Countess with Elizabeth I, Morton would let them retain the Great H and the other jewels. They would have to produce the jewels after he returned to Edinburgh from his progress to Aberdeen, to be "valued and esteemed" by "able men", and at the same "show any manner or cause why they should detain them", and make an undertaking to Morton called a "caution" that the jewels would be available to James VI when required. Morton stated that his ally Elizabeth would be satisfied and "contented" for the Countess of Argyll to retain the jewels under these conditions. If they accepted, he would lift their penalty as technical outlaws, and "relax them from the horn" so they could come to him in person.

Eventually, the Countess returned the "H" and the other jewels to Morton on 5 March 1575. The list of the returned jewels kept by Morton mentions the "H callit the great Hary" with other jewels, three diamonds and three rubies, "ressavit fra the lady Argile". The Countess sent a lawyer, Thomas Craig, to plead on behalf of her daughters Elizabeth and Margaret Stewart that she was still owed money, and was further impoverished by the "letters of horning" raised to recover the Great Harry.

It has been suggested that a portrait of the Countess of Moray depicts her wearing the queen's jewels, with crowns in her hair band, and the jewel worn at her neck includes a large cabochon ruby like that of the Great Harry. However, the picture is usually regarded as a marriage portrait made earlier in the 1560s. More recently the jewellery depicted has been characterised as showing a "costly austerity" in comparison with other renaissance portraits.

== Esmé Stewart, Duke of Lennox and James Stewart, Earl of Arran ==
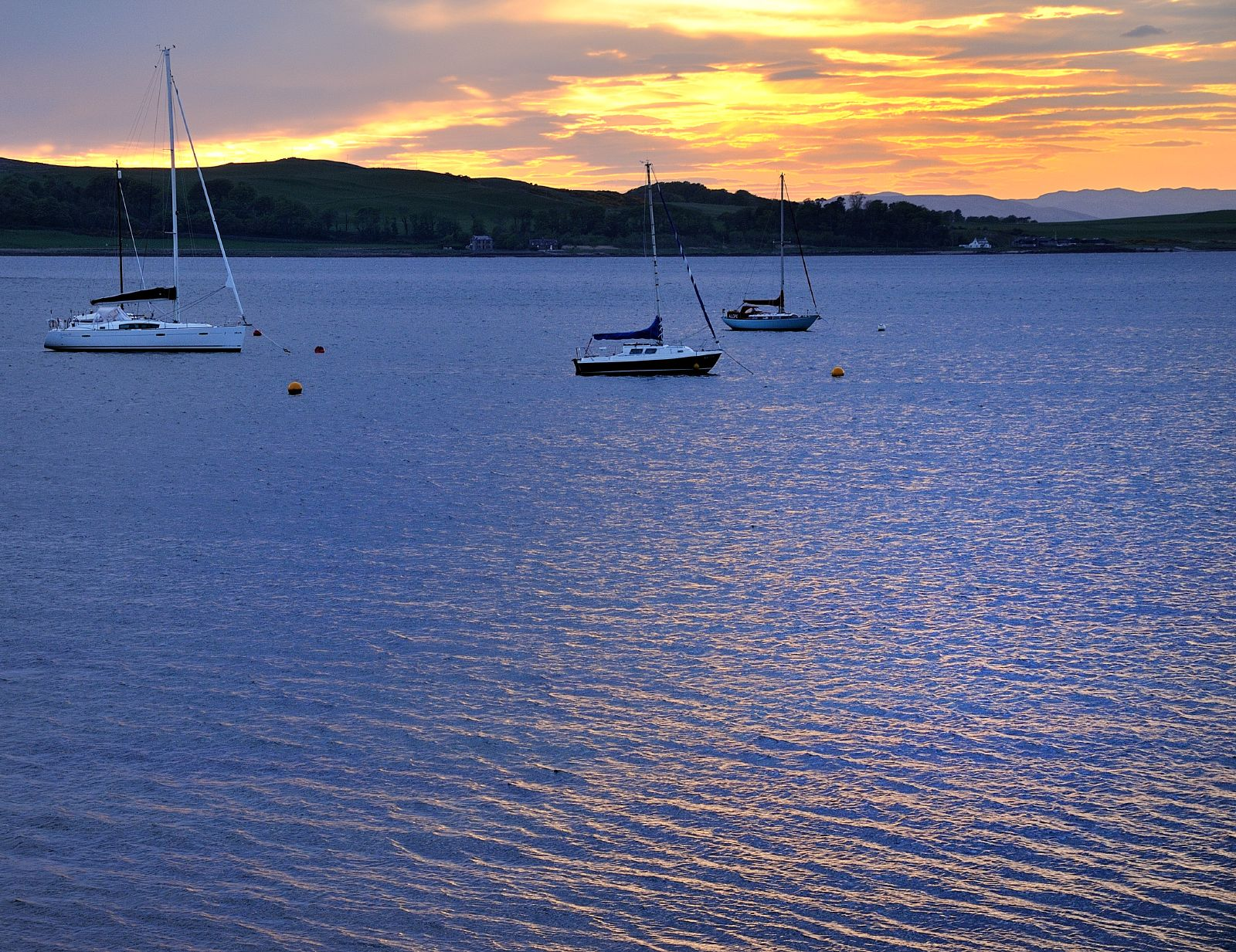
James Stewart, Earl of Arran surrendered the Great H to William Stewart aboard ship at the Fairlie Roads

After James VI came of age, in 1581 he ordered the treasurer, William Ruthven, 1st Earl of Gowrie to give several jewels from his mother's collection to his favourite, Esmé Stewart, 1st Duke of Lennox including, in June, a gold chain of knots of pearls and diamonds. In October Lennox received a gold cross with diamonds and rubies, a chain of rubies, a carcan necklace of diamonds and gold roses, fore and back garnishings for a woman's head dress and other pieces that had belonged to Mary, Queen of Scots, with the Great H, which was again detailed as:

the greit Hary with the letter H contenand a greit dyamant and a greit ruby

The receipt was signed by witnesses including Elizabeth Stewart and Alexander Hay of Easter Kennet. Lennox returned the jewels to James Murray, keeper of the royal wardrobe, when he left for France in 1583.

In 1585, the former royal favourite James Stewart, Earl of Arran was said to have embarked on a boat belonging to Robert Jameson at Ayr carrying royal jewellery including the "Kingis Eitche", but he was forced to give his treasure up to William Stewart aboard ship in the coastal water known as the Fairlie Road. Stewart brought it to the King and the jewel was receipted by Sir George Home. It was noted that William Stewart had negotiated the recovery of the jewels, and delivered the "H" into the "king's own hands". The jewels recovered from the Earl of Arran and his wife Elizabeth Stewart, including the "H" were finally formally returned to the treasurer of Scotland, Robert Melville on 23 February 1586.

== James VI and I ==
James VI gave the 'H' to Anne of Denmark to wear, possibly among a gift of the "greatest part of his jewels" mentioned in December 1593. However, in September 1594 King James pawned the jewel with the goldsmith Thomas Foulis for £12,000 Scots, or £2000 Sterling. With the "H" was a small two inch gold chain. It was noted that the large diamond was in the centre "the middis of the same H". Foulis would be repaid from money sent to James VI by Elizabeth I, now known as the "English subsidy".

=== Slains Castle ===
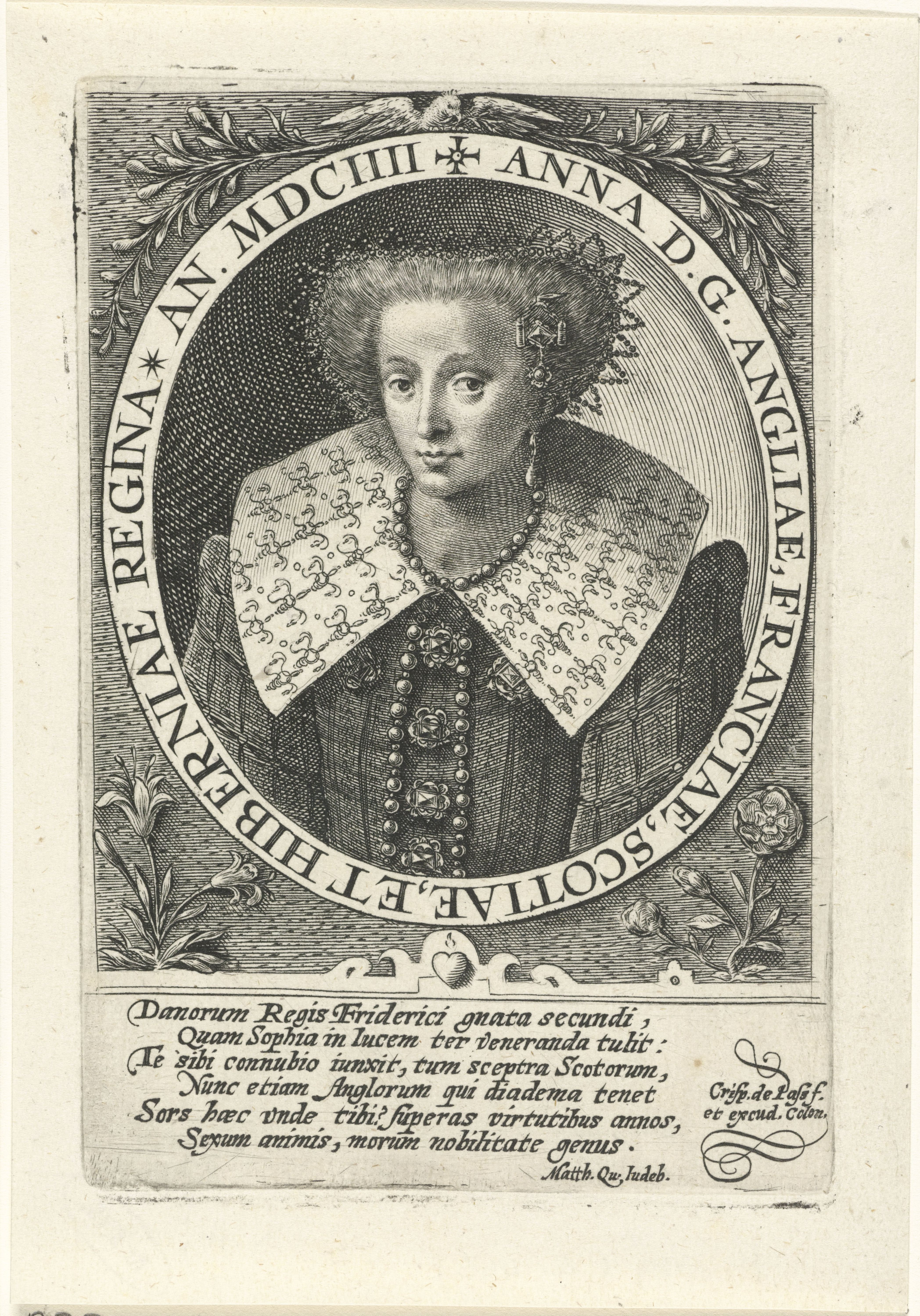
The 1604 engraved portrait of Anne of Denmark by Crispin de Passe, possibly with the Great H worn as a jewel in the hair

James VI needed the money for his military expedition to the north of Scotland against the Earl of Huntly and the Earl of Erroll. The English diplomat George Nicholson heard that Anne of Denmark had offered the "H" to her friend the Countess of Erroll as recompense for the demolition of Slains Castle, and that Foulis had a breakdown in January 1598 when James reclaimed the jewel without payment. Nicolson wrote:

Thomas Fowlis made lately depute-threasurer, fell madd sick this day, some thinck for care of his debtes, others because the King hathe gotten from him the H. which was pawned to him to furnish the Kinges rode last against the papise erles, which H. the King to the Quene who in geistes gave it to the Lady Errol, saying it was litle enoughe that she had it a night for the casting downe of her husbandes house.

=== The Great H and the Mirror of Great Britain ===
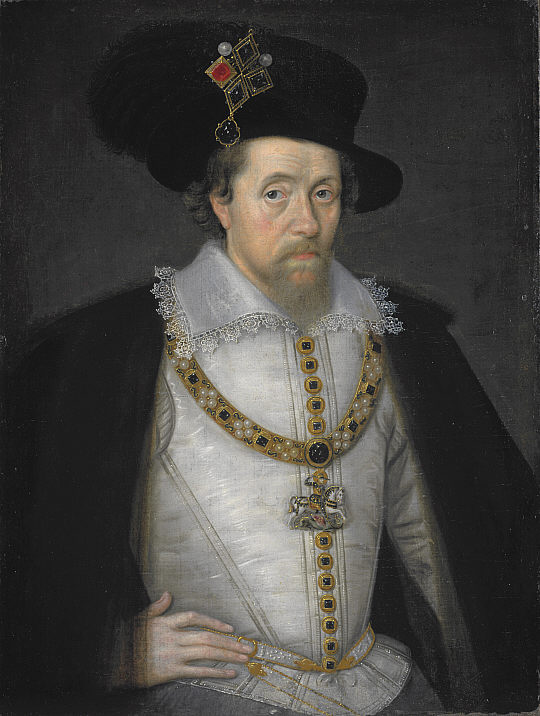
James VI and I wearing the Mirror of Great Britain, including the lozenge diamond of the "H", as a hat jewel, John de Critz, National Galleries Scotland

King James brought the "H" to England, with other jewels deemed to be important, including the "espousall ring of Denmark". Painted portraits of Anne of Denmark made at this time show her wearing a jewel including a large diamond and cabochon ruby, flanked by four precious stones on both sides, worn as a pendant from a necklace. An engraving by Crispin de Passe dated 1604 includes a similar jewel worn in her hair.

In 1604 or 1605 the Great H was dismantled and the large diamond, which was described as "cut lozenge-wise", was used in the new Mirror of Great Britain which James wore as a hat badge. The Mirror of Great Britain was created to commemorate the Union of the Crowns of 1603. It included the Sancy Diamond, for which the French ambassador Christophe de Harlay, comte de Beaumont was paid 60,000 French crowns.

The Mirror of Great Britain, including the ruby of the Great H, was annexed to the crown for posterity by James VI and I in March 1606. The remaining components of the Great 'H' were mentioned in 1606 when George Home, now Earl of Dunbar, gave up the office of Master of the Wardrobe and delivered to James Hay, master of the robes, the rest of the jewel including the chain and ruby.

== Other royal "H" jewels ==
Arbella Stuart had an "H" of gold set with a rock ruby, among jewels bequeathed to her by her grandmother Margaret Douglas. Her mother's executor Thomas Fowler took these pieces to Scotland and died in April 1590 while James VI was in Denmark. Francis Stewart, 5th Earl of Bothwell obtained Arbella's jewels and seems to have delivered them to the king. This "H" may have belonged to Margaret Tudor, sister of Henry VIII, and wife of James IV of Scotland.

King James gave an "old jewel" in the form of an 'H' from the royal collection to Frances Howard, Duchess of Richmond on 11 March 1623. This jewel had two pointed diamonds, six table cut diamonds, and three pendant pearls, and was kept in a crimson box in the secret jewel house of the Tower of London. King James had previously given this jewel to Anna of Denmark in 1607, and she also had another "H" jewel with rubies and diamonds.

Prince Henry had yet another "H" jewel, described after his death as "a ballas ruby in form of an H with pearls upon every side, with a great pearl hanging thereto." It is not clear if this was newly made for Henry or was another heirloom piece.

In 1540 Henry VIII gave Katherine Howard an "hache of gold wherin is vj feir diamondes" with an emerald and four pendant pearls, which differs from the pieces described above. A 17th-century Howard family will mentions an "H" jewel, said to have been Catherine Howard's, with seven diamonds and three pendant pearls. Among jewels with the letters "H" and "K" in a coffer marked as the "Queen's Jewels" in 1547 was an "H" with seven diamonds and three pendant pearls.

Anne Seymour, Duchess of Somerset who died in 1587, owned "a fair square tablet of gold like an H, with four diamonds, and a rock ruby or ballas in the midst, garnished with pearl, with a pearl pendant".
