= Sancy =

Historic diamond once part of English crown jewels

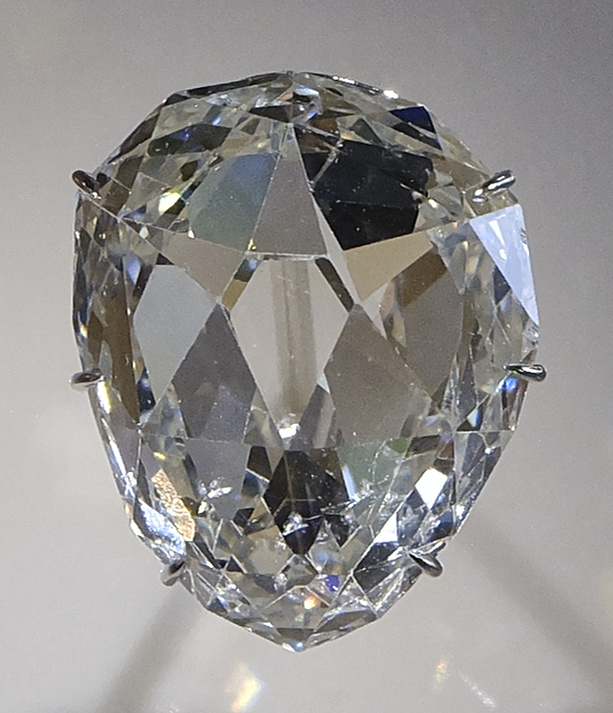
- Sancy diamond
- Weight: 55.23 carats (11.046 g)
- Color: Pale yellow, exact color grade not recorded.
- Cut: Shield-shaped modified brilliant cut
- Country of origin: India
- Discovered: Before 1570
- Owner: The Louvre, Paris, France

The Sancy, a pale yellow diamond of 55.23 carats (11.046 g), was reputed to have belonged to the Mughal emperors, and is at least probably Indian in origin owing to its cut, which is unusual by Western standards. The stone has been owned by a number of important figures in European history, such as Charles the Bold, James VI and I, and the Astor family.

The shield-shaped stone comprises two back-to-back crowns (the typical upper half of a stone) but lacks any semblance to a pavilion (the lower portion of a stone, below the girdle or midsection).

== History ==
The diamond now known as the Sancy began as an even larger diamond called the Balle de Flandres with a possible weight of over 100 carats (20 g). The Balle was part of the dowry of Valentina Visconti when she married Louis I, Duke of Orléans (the younger brother of King Charles VI of France) in 1398. While the precise path of ownership over the next 75 years is uncertain, the stone found its way to Charles the Bold, Duke of Burgundy, who lost it together with an array of other treasures – including his silver bath and the Three Brothers jewel – when he was defeated in the Battle of Grandson in 1476. Balfour (2009) posits that this diamond is the same stone that eventually became the Sancy.

After Charles died, in 1477 the diamond passed to his cousin King Manuel I of Portugal. When Portugal was threatened to come under Spanish rule, claimant António, Prior of Crato fled the country with the bulk of the Portuguese Crown Jewels. He spent his life trying to get allies to regain the Portuguese throne in the French and English courts, and eventually sold the diamond to Nicolas de Harlay, seigneur de Sancy. Other sources claim that the diamond was purchased in Constantinople by de Sancy. He was popular in the French court and was later French ambassador to the Ottoman Empire. Something of a gem connoisseur, de Sancy used his knowledge to prosperous advantage.

Henry III of France suffered from premature baldness and tried to conceal this fact by wearing a cap. As diamonds were becoming increasingly fashionable at the time, Henry arranged to borrow de Sancy's diamond to decorate his cap. Henry's successor Henry IV of France also borrowed the stone, but for the more practical purpose of collateral for financing an army. An apocryphal tale from the time of de Sancy's possession of the stone tells of a messenger carrying the jewel, but never reaching his destination. Nevertheless, de Sancy (by then Superintendent of Finance) was convinced that the man had remained loyal and conducted a search until the messenger was discovered robbed and murdered. When the body was disinterred, the jewel was found in the faithful man's stomach.

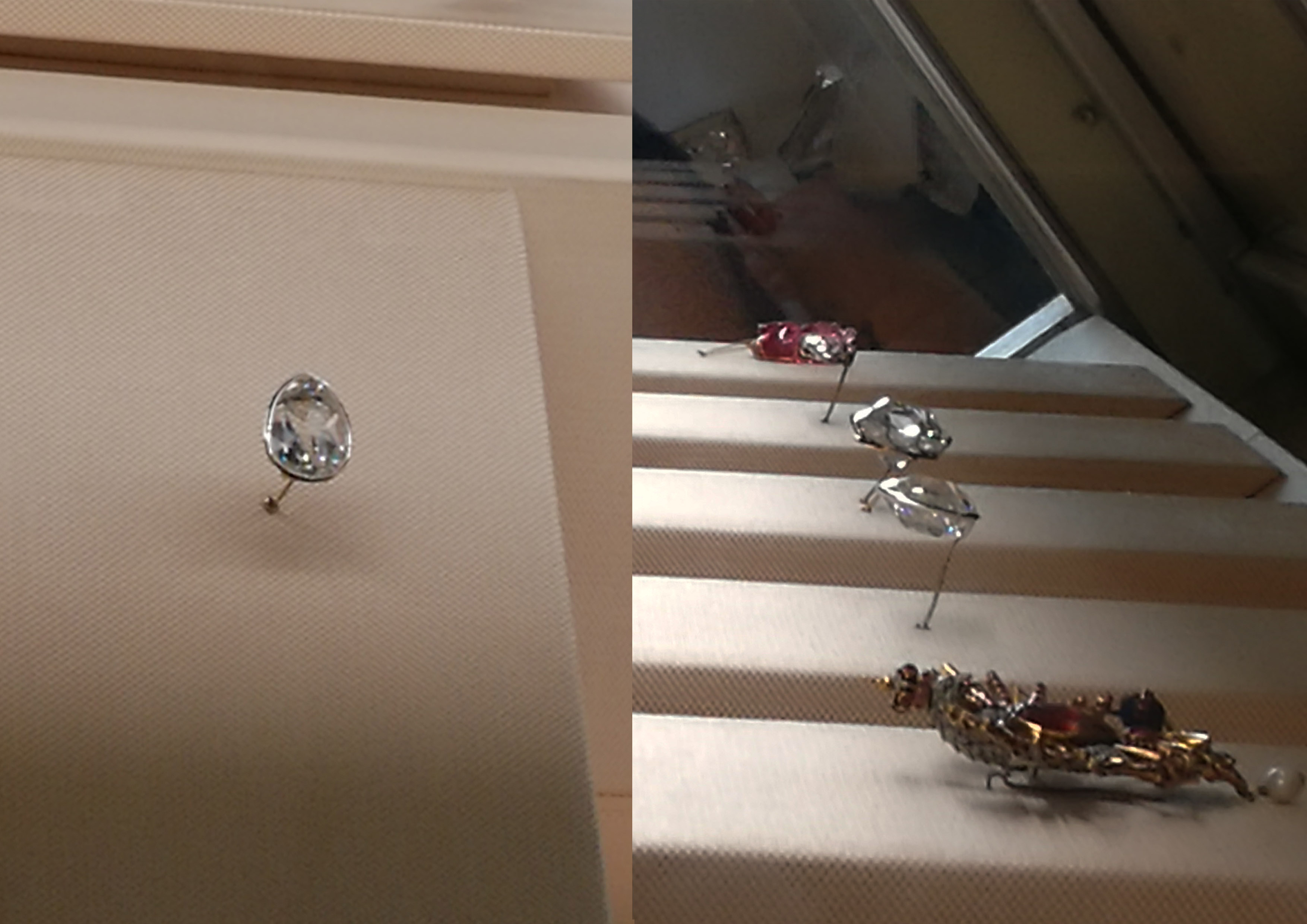
The Sancy in the Louvre

Facing financial difficulties, de Sancy was forced to sell the diamond to King James VI and I in March 1605 when it is thought the Sancy acquired its name. It weighed 53 carats and cost 60,000 French crowns. De Sancy's brother, Robert de Harlay, Baron of Monglat, and his cousin Christophe de Harlay, Count of Beaumont, the French ambassador in London handled the sale. It was described in the Tower of London's 1605 Inventory of Jewels as "...one fayre dyamonde, cut in fawcetts, bought of Sauncy." James had it set into the Mirror of Great Britain, with diamonds from the Great H of Scotland.

The Sancy was briefly possessed by Charles I (King of England, Scotland and Ireland) and then by his third son James II. Beleaguered after a devastating defeat, James took shelter under Louis XIV of France, a fickle host who tired of his exiled guest. Facing destitution, James had no choice but to sell the Sancy to Cardinal Mazarin in 1657 for the reported sum of £25,000 (equivalent to £4.76 million in 2025). The Cardinal bequeathed the diamond to the King upon his death in 1661.

The Sancy was thus domiciled in France but disappeared during the French Revolution when brigands raided the Garde Meuble (Royal Treasury). As well as the Sancy, other treasures stolen were the Regent Diamond, and the French Blue diamond which is known today as the Hope Diamond.

The Sancy was in the collection of Józef Rudanovsky until 1828 when purchased by Prince Paul Demidoff for £80,000 (£7.52 million in 2025). Prince Demidoff gave the Sancy 1836 to his Finnish wife, Aurora Demidoff (Stjernvall), as a morning gift. Prince Demidoff died 1840 and Aurora married again 1846 with Colonel Andrei Karamzin who died 1854 in the Crimean War. Aurora Karamzin had to sell the Sancy in 1865 to Sir Jamsetjee Jeejeebhoy, an Indian Parsi merchant , for £100,000 (equivalent to £10.86 million in 2025) to cover the debts of her son Paul Demidoff. Sir Jamtsetjee sold the Sancy only a year later, creating another gap in its history. It reappeared in 1867, displayed at the Paris Exposition, carrying a price tag of 1 million French francs; the gem then vanished again for forty years.

External image
- Grayscale photo of Sancy diamond at Louvre website; photo's description (in French)

The Sancy next surfaced in 1906 when bought by William Waldorf Astor, 1st Viscount Astor, from famous Russian collector A.K. Rudanovsky. The prominent Astor family possessed it for 72 years until William Waldorf Astor, 4th Viscount Astor sold it to the Louvre for $1 million in 1978 (equivalent to $4.94 million in 2025). The Sancy now rests in the Apollo Gallery, together with the likes of the Regent Diamond and the Hortensia Diamond.

== See also ==
- List of diamonds
