= Cornelis de Neve =

Flemish painter

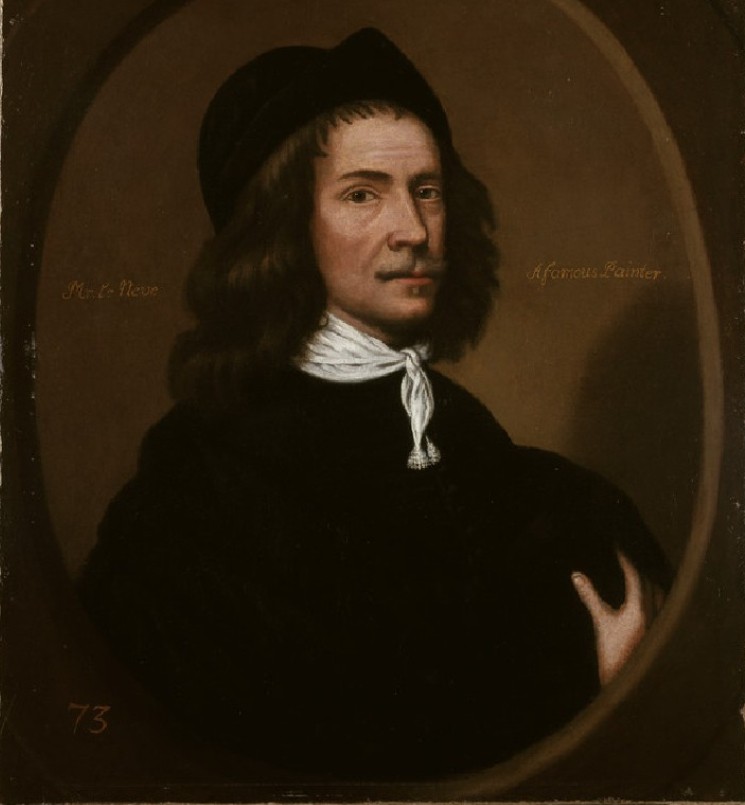
Self-portrait

Cornelis de Neve or Cornelius de Neve (1602 and 1622 – c. 1678) was a Flemish painter who worked for a long period in England as a portrait artist.

== Life ==
Very few details about the life of the artist are known. His father was a painter referred to as Cornelis de Neve the Elder. His father must have moved to London where he died before 1609. Sarah Pookes, the widow of Cornelis de Neve the Elder and the mother of the young Cornelis remarried John de Critz in 1609. John de Critz was a portrait painter who was a prominent member of the Flemish émigré family de Critz. He was also the uncle by marriage of Hester Tradescant.

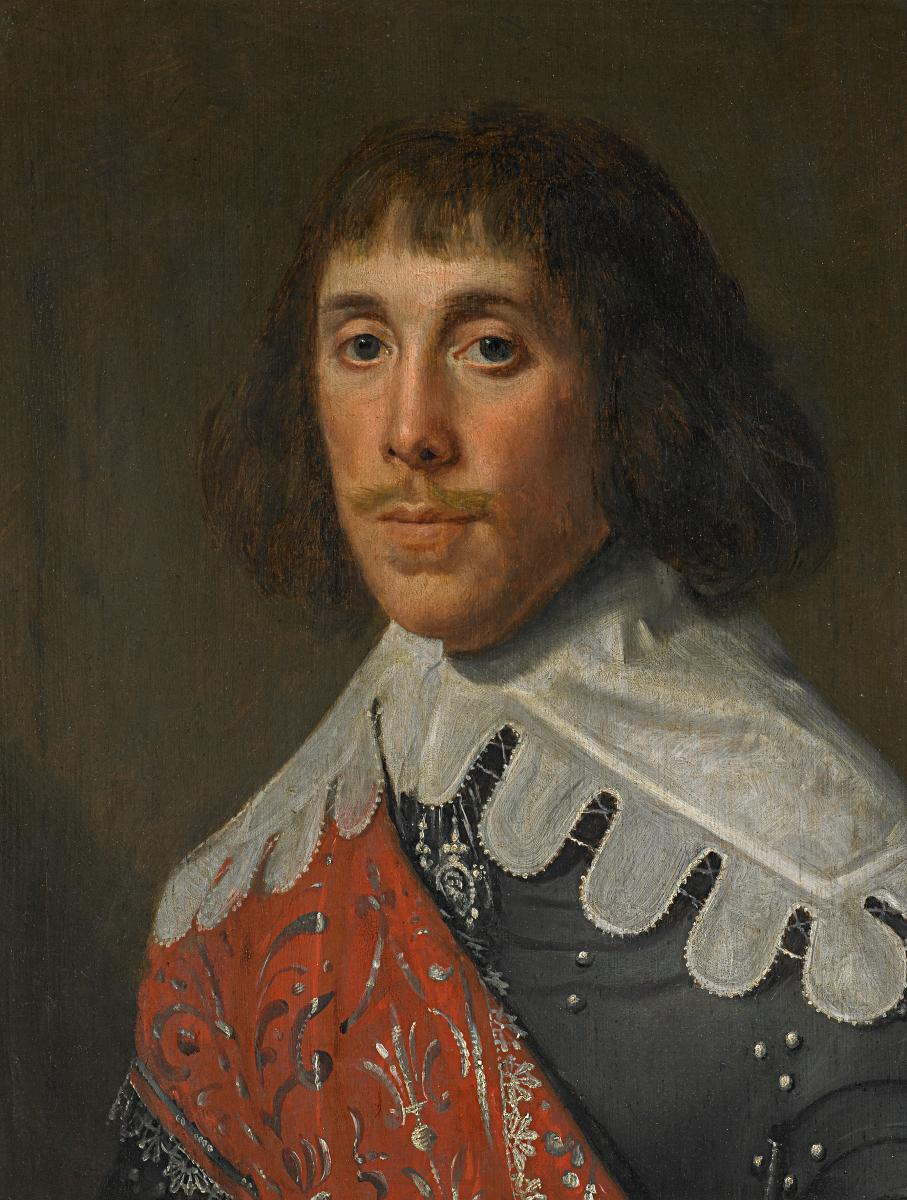
Portrait of an officer

Cornelis de Neve must therefore have been born before 1609. Some art historians believe de Neve may have been a pupil of Anthony van Dyck.

== Work ==
Cornelis de Neve was a specialist portrait painter. His first dated works are from 1627. Only a limited number of works are attributed to the artist. As he was part of the circle of portrait painters of the de Critz family, it has been difficult to attribute particular works to de Neve or a member of the de Critz family. For instance, the Portrait of John Tradescant the elder (Ashmolean Museum) was formerly attributed to Cornelis de Neve but is now given to Emanuel de Critz, son of John de Critz.
