= Dorothy Speckard =

Dorothy Speckard or Speckart or Spekarde née Acton (died 1656) was a courtier, milliner, silkwoman, and worker in the wardrobe of Elizabeth I of England, Anne of Denmark, Prince Henry, and Henrietta Maria. Her husband, Abraham Speckard, was an investor in the Somers Isles Company which colonised Bermuda.

== Career ==
Dorothy Speckard was a daughter of William Acton of Worcestershire. Her family was the Burton branch of the Actons of Sutton near Tenbury Wells, and her second cousin and contemporary Joyce Acton married Thomas Lucy of Charlecote. Another relation, John Acton, a son of Charles Acton of Elmley Lovett, became a goldsmith in London by 1595 and worked for King James and Charles I. She was left the gift of cow by the will of a godparent Richard Upton of Upton court in the parish of Little Hereford in 1588.

She married Abraham Speckard (d. 1642), a gentleman or merchant in London, the couple were wealthy. The historian Patricia Wardle noted a Mary Spekehard, of Flemish origin, working in London selling linen in 1571, who may possibly have been a relation of Abraham Speckhard. Abraham Speckart received a grant of arms in November 1611, and the couple's conjoint heraldry was depicted in a window of St Giles in the Fields.

=== Queen Elizabeth ===
She was ranked as a "Gentlewoman" and participated in gift exchange at Elizabeth's court. At New Year 1599/1600 the Speckards gave Queen Elizabeth a head veil of striped network, flourished with carnation silk and embroidered with metallic "Oes". At the same time, Elizabeth Brydges, a maid of honour presented a doublet of network lawn, cut and tufted up with white knit-work, flourished with silver. In 1605 she gave King James a shirt of fine Holland linen with band and cuffs of cut work. She was also called the queen's "silkewoman", in the king's household she was described as an "artificier", while her husband was the queen's milliner.

She made veils, "tires" and "devices" for the queen and women of the court to wear in their hair, with other accessories including sleeves and ruffs. A particular speciality in the years 1601-1603 were pieces fashioned and woven from hair including; hair-braids, pyramids, globes, loops and tufts, to decorate the queen's wigs. A warrant of 1602 includes "six heads of hair, twelve yards of hair curl, one hundred devices of hair".

In 1601, Speckard washed and mended one the queen's favourite riding outfits, a safeguard and jupe embroidered with stars of Venice silver and gold wheat ears. Customers included Helena, Marchioness of Northampton, and Phillipa Wotton, Lady Bacon for whom she mended a hood.

=== Anne of Denmark ===
Anne of Denmark made her a "chamberer" of the bedchamber and a lady of her privy chamber. According to a surviving wardrobe inventory, she received some of the clothes delivered to the queen, and on 30 May 1610 the queen gave her a black satin gown.

As a New Year's Day gift in January 1605 she gave King James two handkerchiefs embroidered with Venice gold and a cutwork handkerchief. She supplied Anne of Denmark with £350 of goods while the queen was lying in at Greenwich Palace in 1605, pregnant with Princess Mary. In October 1607 Susan de Vere, Countess of Montgomery, a lady-in-waiting to Anna of Denmark took sick-leave from court. Her uncle Robert Cecil, 1st Earl of Salisbury sent her a present for the queen. She wrote that "Mrs Speckerd" would make it up, as he had instructed, and she would present it to the queen when she was well.

She made costumes for the masque Tethys' Festival in 1610.

Speckard was given mourning clothes on the death of Prince Henry in 1612. In 1615 King James granted the couple rights in the Somerset manors of Norton St Philip and Hinton Charterhouse.

In December 1617 the Venetian ambassador Piero Contarini described the appearance of Anne of Denmark at Somerset House. Her hair was dressed with diamonds and other jewels and extended in rays or like the petals of a sunflower with artificial hair. This may have been provided by Speckard, or the Queen's tire-woman in ordinary, Blanche Swansted. Swansted was sent to Edinburgh at the Union of Crowns in 1603 to dress Anne of Denmark's hair and remained in her service.

When Anne of Denmark died in 1619, Dorothy Speckard provided a veil edged with lace for the funeral effigy, and walked in the procession, listed with the ladies of the Privy Chamber. Other servants, suppliers, and workers in the wardrobe such as Blanche Swansted, the laundress Elizabeth Rider, and Esther Le Tellier walked as a group of nine women following the servants of the countesses at court. A version of Anne's household roll written in French in 1619 describes her as late the queen's silkworker, "Dame Suanstel, ouvryer en soye". An inventory was made of the queen's possessions at Somerset House and a red leather case with the queen's embroidered linen waistcoats and silk stockings was noted as "Mrs Speckarts charge", her responsibility.

Abraham Speckard was involved in long-running Chancery case with debtors including Sir John Kennedy, the husband of Elizabeth Brydges. He was an investor in the Somers Isles Company formed to colonise Bermuda. In 1620, he contributed £12-10s to Baptist Hicks as an adventurer in the Virginia Company.

=== Later life ===
She worked as the "queen's starcher" to Henrietta Maria in 1626, and made shirts for Charles I, and was rewarded with a gift of silver plate. Abraham and Dorothy must have managed a large workshop employing several seamstresses.

In 1622 the couple bought land adjacent to the church of St Giles in the Fields in London and built a house. Zachary Bethell, a servant of the queen's wardrobe lived nearby. Abraham Speckard donated a stained-glass window in 1628 depicting "Abraham and Isaac". In 1630 he paid for a new churchyard wall in 1630, in which there was a private door into their garden. In his will, he requested to be buried in the church under his pew, his body to be carried from his lodging "through the back part into the churchyard with decency".

In 1647 she petitioned Parliament on account of her poverty and received a grant of £100, of which she was paid £75 on 16 November 1647.

She died in 1656. The door in the churchyard wall was blocked up in 1670.
