= Oliver de Critz =

English painter (1626–1651)

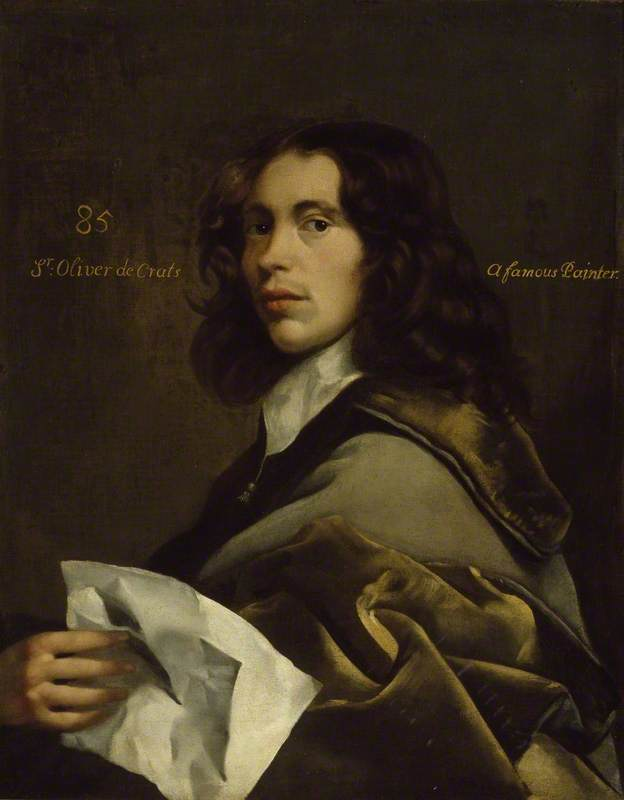
Oliver de Critz, possibly a self-portrait

Oliver de Critz (1626 – 1651) was an English painter.

He was born in London in 1626, the son of John de Critz, a painter of Flemish descent who was the Serjeant Painter of Britain, and his third wife. His relatives Thomas and Emmanuel were also painters. His name is also spelled Oliver Decritz and Oliver de Crats.

A possible self-portrait by Oliver de Critz is in the Ashmolean Museum. In it, he is depicted with a green cloak. In 1646, Oliver de Critz inherited from his grandfather "my greene Cloake". However, this portrait could also be the work of his half-brother Thomas.

He died in London in August or September 1651, and was buried on 27 September 1651.

== Sources ==
- R.L. Poole, An outline of the history of the De Critz family of painters, The Walpole Society 2 (1912-1913), pp. 45–68
- Thieme, Ulrich; Becker, Felix, Allgemeines Lexikon der bildenden Künstler : von der Antike bis zur Gegenwart vol. 8, Leipzig: Seemann (1917), p. 532
- Bénézit, Emmanuel, Dictionnaire critique et documentaire des peintres, sculpteurs, dessinateurs et graveurs de tous les temps et de tous les pays vol. 3, Paris: Gründ (1976), p. 422
- A checklist of painters c1200-1976 represented in the Witt Library, Courtauld Institute of Art, London, London: Mansell (1978), p. 75
