= Matthew Hairstanes =

Scottish courtier

Matthew Hairstanes (who died in 1625) was a Scottish courtier.

His family was from Dumfries.

Hairstanes was a page and groom of the bedchamber to Anne of Denmark, queen consort of James VI and I. He may be the "Matheas" mentioned in records of the Scottish wardrobe. In England his annual salary was £40. He was also described as a "wardrober" to King James. He was rewarded in 1610 for his work as a bedchamber servant to the king and queen with lands at Middilbie in Annandale. Another Scottish servant, the usher James Maxwell, received a similar grant on the same day.

Hairstanes married Elizabeth (Bessie) Gledstanes. He obtained part of the lands of Kelwood and Craig or Craigs south of Dumfries when his wife's father John Gledstanes died in 1619. He was then known as "Hairstanes of Craigs" or of "Kelwood Craigs". He had already purchased the lands and fortalice of Over Kelwood with the chapel of Saint Lawrence in 1612 from a kinsman of his wife, Alexander Gledstanes, a son of the Bishop of St Andrews, George Gledstanes.

It has been suggested that Alexander Gledstanes sold the property to Hairstanes in the hope that the groom could gain the queen's influence to appoint him Archdeacon of St Andrews.

The historian Maureen Meikle suggests that Hairstanes may have been a Roman Catholic servant of Anne of Denmark, among other Catholic bedchamber servants including Jane Drummond, Anne Hay, Anna Livingstone, and Piero Hugon. Matthew Hairstanes lent money to another courtier Claud Hamilton of Shawfield, the debt was recorded in Shawfield's wife's will of 1613. Other members of the family, two brothers John and Robert Hairstanes, attended the Scots College at Douai, a Catholic seminary, in this period.

Hairstanes died in May 1625. His three daughters died in his lifetime, or shortly after, Craigs and his other properties passed to his older brother John Hairstanes.
