= Piero Hugon =

Piero or Pierre Hugon (floruit 1600–1625) was a French servant of Anne of Denmark accused of stealing her jewels.

== Career at the royal court in England ==
Piero Hugon was the first page of the bedchamber and trusted servant of Anne of Denmark, the wife of King James. Amongst the duties of daily attendance, in February 1613 he was sent to give Princess Elizabeth a jewel to wear at her wedding to Frederick V of the Palatinate. He travelled to the Danish court for her in 1618.

He may have been the queen's French servant noted in July 1614. Her brother Christian IV came to London incognito and managed to enter Denmark House (Somerset House) without being discovered. He was recognised in the audience chamber by "Cardel, a dancer" (Thomas Cardell) and the French servant agreed. He went to tell Anne of Denmark, who was dining in the gallery, and she laughed at him, thinking it was a kind of joke. Christian IV then entered the room. She took off a jewel she was wearing and gave it to the French servant.

There was another French-born gentleman servant, Arthur Bodren, who kept some household accounts and gave the architect Inigo Jones money for his work for the queen. Bodren had been a member of the household of the infant Princess Mary. Bodren, and the queen's Danish cook Hans Poppilman, were naturalised as denizens of England in July 1618. One of the pages of the bedchamber, Matthew Hairstanes, was Scottish.

Hugon was described as "her creature and favourite", and according to a letter describing the queen's last days, "Pira, and the Dutch woman that serves her" were the queen's closest attendants at the deathbed, excluding other courtiers from her presence. Named in an inventory as "Mr Pero" and "Mrs Hanna" they took delivery of furnishings sent from Oatlands Palace to Anne at Hampton Court. In the day's after Anne's death, Piero travelled to Oatlands to help inventory her possessions.

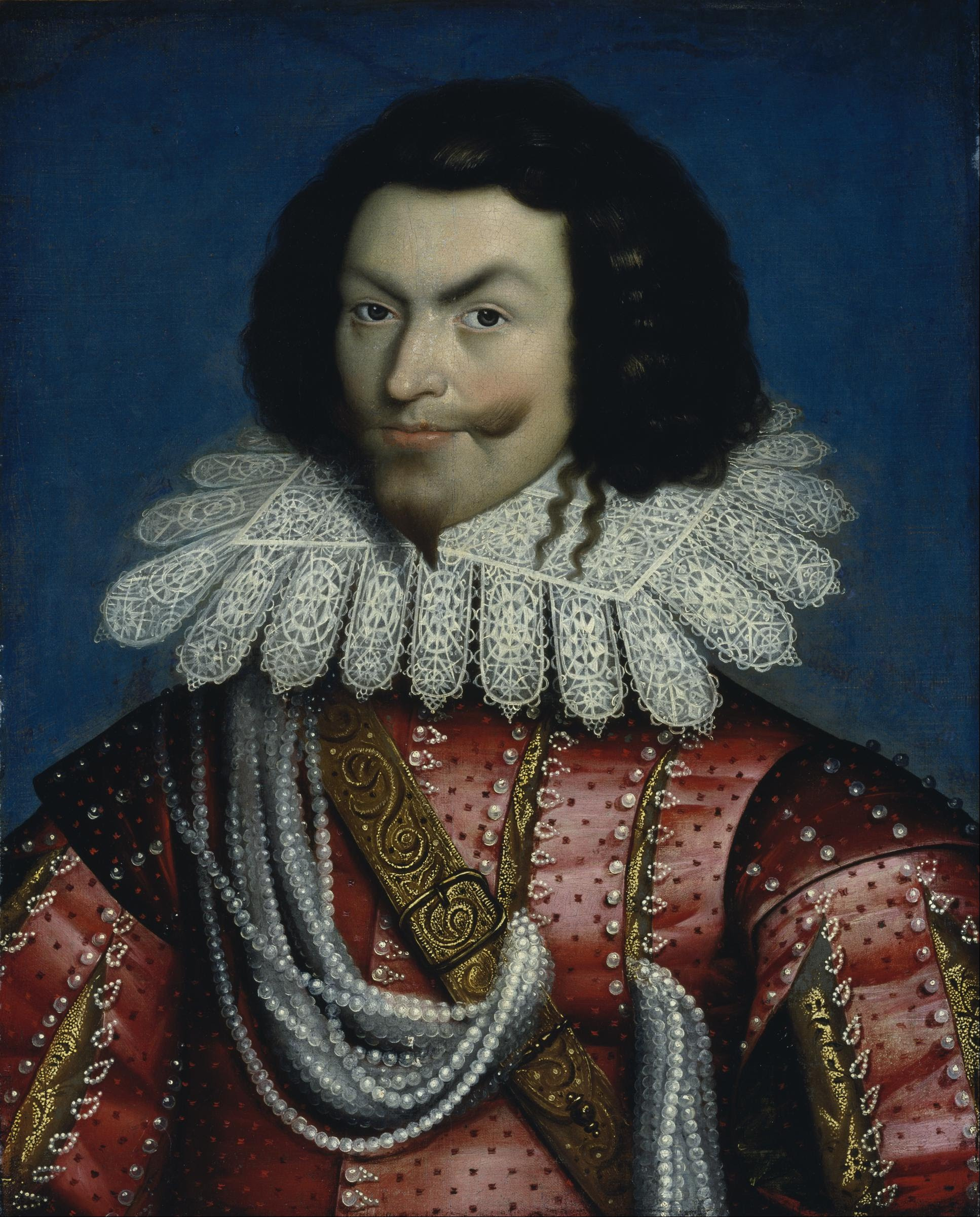
George Villiers, Marquess of Buckingham promised to protect the late queen's page

After Anne of Denmark's funeral in May 1619, Piero Hugon and a "Dutch" servant called Anna were accused of theft. This Anna was perhaps the Danish Anna Kaas who had served the queen since her first days in Scotland, or Hugon's wife Anna who served the Queen as a chamberer.

The theft was discovered by one of the goldsmiths who supplied jewels to the queen, either William Herrick or George Heriot. An inventory of her jewels and plate was made by Sir Lionel Cranfield on 19 April 1619. George Heriot produced "models" or drawings of missing jewels which he had supplied to the queen, said to be worth £63,000.

Dutch Anna and Piero were taken to the Tower of London and charged with stealing jewels worth £30,000. James Howell heard rumours and wrote, "Q. Anne left a world of brave jewels behind, but one Piero, an outlandish man, who had the keeping of them, embezzled many, and is run away."

Piero Hugon had powerful supporters, and soon after the arrest, at Greenwich, the Marquess of Buckingham promised François Juvenal, Marquis de Traisnel, who had come to offer the French king's condolences to James, that he would protect Hugon. The Marquis wrote to Buckingham that Louis XIII was convinced of his innocence. Buckingham and Robert Naunton corresponded with the English ambassador in Paris, Sir Edward Herbert and his brother Henry Herbert.

Another French ambassador François de Bassompierre, Count of Tillières, tried to help Hugon. A draft letter written in answer to Tillières gives more detail of the accusations and proceedings. King James ordered a chest confiscated in Paris from Hugon to be given to Mr (Henry) Herbert, the brother of Sir Edward Herbert, and Hugo was compensated with £500. The missing jewels were worth £60,000. Hugon was also accused of sending the queen's money and some religious items after her death to a nunnery and to some Jesuits to pray for her soul. These accusations were not sent to Tillières, after Hugon was interrogated in the Tower and he made a deal or bargain. Edward Herbert discovered that the brother of Louis Richard, one of the queen's musicians, had carried packages to France for Hugon.

Edward Herbert made an inventory of two chests belonging to Hugon, and the contents were thought to include some of the queen's jewels. He was concerned by various Catholic items he saw. There were many items of jewelry and costume, silverware, a bracelet set with turquoise and diamonds, and two bezoar stones. Attached to a string of pearls was Hugon's note that Anne of Denmark had given them to him on his wedding day with a large diamond, and the pearls should be sold and the proceeds used to say Masses for the queen. Marie de' Medici became involved, who declared via Pierre Brûlart, marquis de Sillery, Viscount Puisieux, that she had always been well-disposed to the service of the late queen Anne. Puisieux believed that Hugon was detained in England by the Spanish-favouring faction at court.

== Analysis ==
Maureen Meikle and Helen M. Payne propose that Hugon had become a significant figure in the queen's household after the departure of Jean Drummond, Countess of Roxburghe. Assuming that many or most of the items in the inventory had belonged to the queen, including Catholic items, they suggest that Anne of Denmark had asked him to take them away to prevent their discovery, although the outcome was the exact opposite. Hugon's confession that money was intended to found a monastery in France ought to be taken as evidence for the queen's Catholic faith. Jemma Field argues from the same evidence that Anne of Denmark maintained a position that was a "middle path" or "via media" in her own religion.

== In France ==
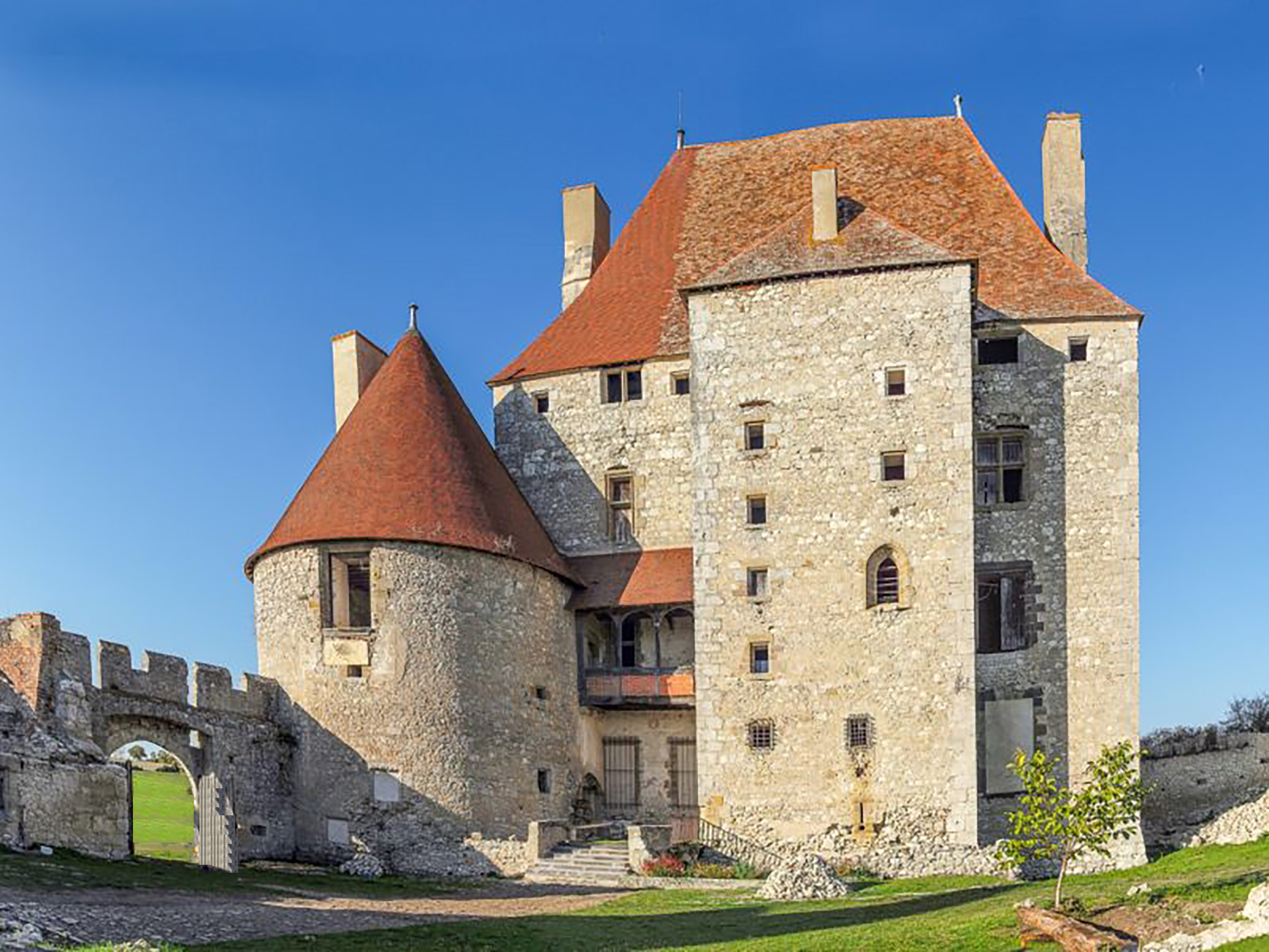
Hugon became the proprietor of Fourchaud

In 1616, following the humble petitions they addressed to Anne of Denmark to inform her of their poverty, the nuns of Yzeure received from her an alms of one thousand livres, which was to be paid to them in Paris. In return, they undertook to have a Mass celebrated in perpetuity on the first Sunday of every month in a chapel of their church dedicated to the Queen, to have her coat of arms displayed there, and to preserve her memory in their regular prayers. The granting of this alms was probably connected with the intervention of Pierre Hugon whose family originated from Yzeure and the surrounding area of Cressanges. The nuns received the sum on 3 September 1616. The chapel was demolished in the 19th century.

Piero Hugon was ennobled in France in 1618 and became the Sieur de Givry, le Breuil et la Fouresthile. He had acquired the Château de Fourchaud (Besson) in 1620 for his wife. He had married Anne Rumler, who was probably a sister of Anne of Denmark's German-born apothecary, John Wolfgang Rumler. They were both naturalized as denizens of England on 4 May 1618. Anne attended the funeral of Anne of Denmark, listed as "Mrs Ann Rubellow" with the ladies of the Privy Chamber.

Hugon chose an armorial reflecting his service to the queen of England. Formerly visible on a fireback from the Château de Fourchaud, now lost. He had further dealings with the Richard brothers in 1620.

Anne Hugon died in 1661, aged 85, at Fourchaud and was buried at Besson. Shortly before her death she renounced the Lutheran faith of her birth. Their eldest son and heir was Gaspard Hugon.

Fourchaud now belongs to Prince Charles-Henri de Lobkowicz.
