= John Tradescant the Younger =

British botanist (1608–1662)

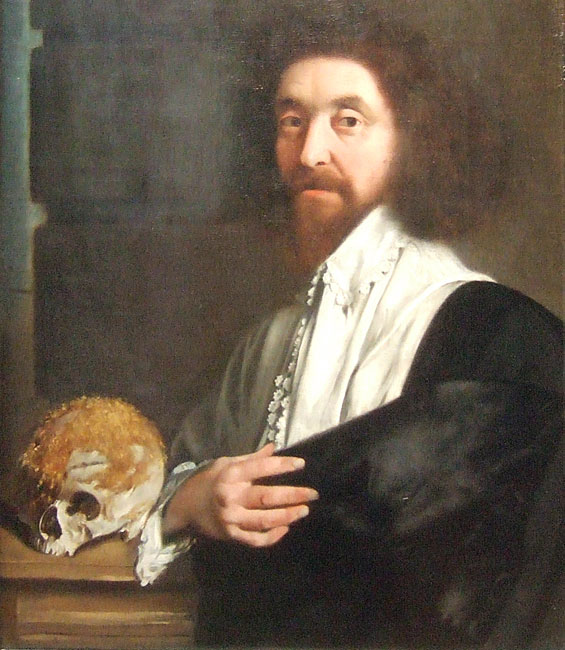
- John Tradescant the Younger, attributed to Thomas de Critz
- Born: 4 August 1608; Meopham, Kent, England
- Died: 22 April 1662 (aged 53); Lambeth, London, England
- Scientific career
- Fields: botany
- Author abbrev. (botany): Trad.

John Tradescant the Younger ( /trəˈdɛskənt/; 4 August 1608 – 22 April 1662), son of John Tradescant the Elder, was a botanist and gardener. The standard author abbreviation Trad. is applied to species he described.

== Biography ==
Son of John Tradescant the Elder, he was born in Meopham, Kent, and educated at The King's School, Canterbury. Like his father, who collected specimens and rarities on his many trips abroad, he undertook collecting expeditions to Virginia between 1628 and 1637 (and possibly two more trips by 1662, though Potter and other authors doubt this). Among the seeds he brought back to introduce to English gardens were great American trees including magnolias, bald cypress and tulip tree, and garden plants such as phlox and asters.

John Tradescant the Younger added his American acquisitions to the family's cabinet of curiosities, known as The Ark. These included the ceremonial cloak of Chief Powhatan, an important Native American relic. South Lambeth Road in Vauxhall was one of the boundaries of the Tradescant estate, where the collection was kept and Tradescant Road was laid out after the estate was built on in the 1870s and named after the family.

When his father died, he succeeded as head gardener to King Charles I and Queen Henrietta Maria, making gardens at the Queen's House, Greenwich, designed by Inigo Jones, from 1638 to 1642, when the queen fled the Civil War. He published the contents of his father's celebrated collection as Musaeum Tradescantianum—books, coins, weapons, costumes, taxidermy, and other curiosities—dedicating the first edition to the Royal College of Physicians (with whom he was negotiating for the transfer of his botanic garden), and the second edition to the recently restored Charles II. Tradescant bequeathed his library and museum to (or some say it was swindled from him by) Elias Ashmole (1617–1692), whose name it bears as the core of the Ashmolean Museum in Oxford where the Tradescant collections remain largely intact.

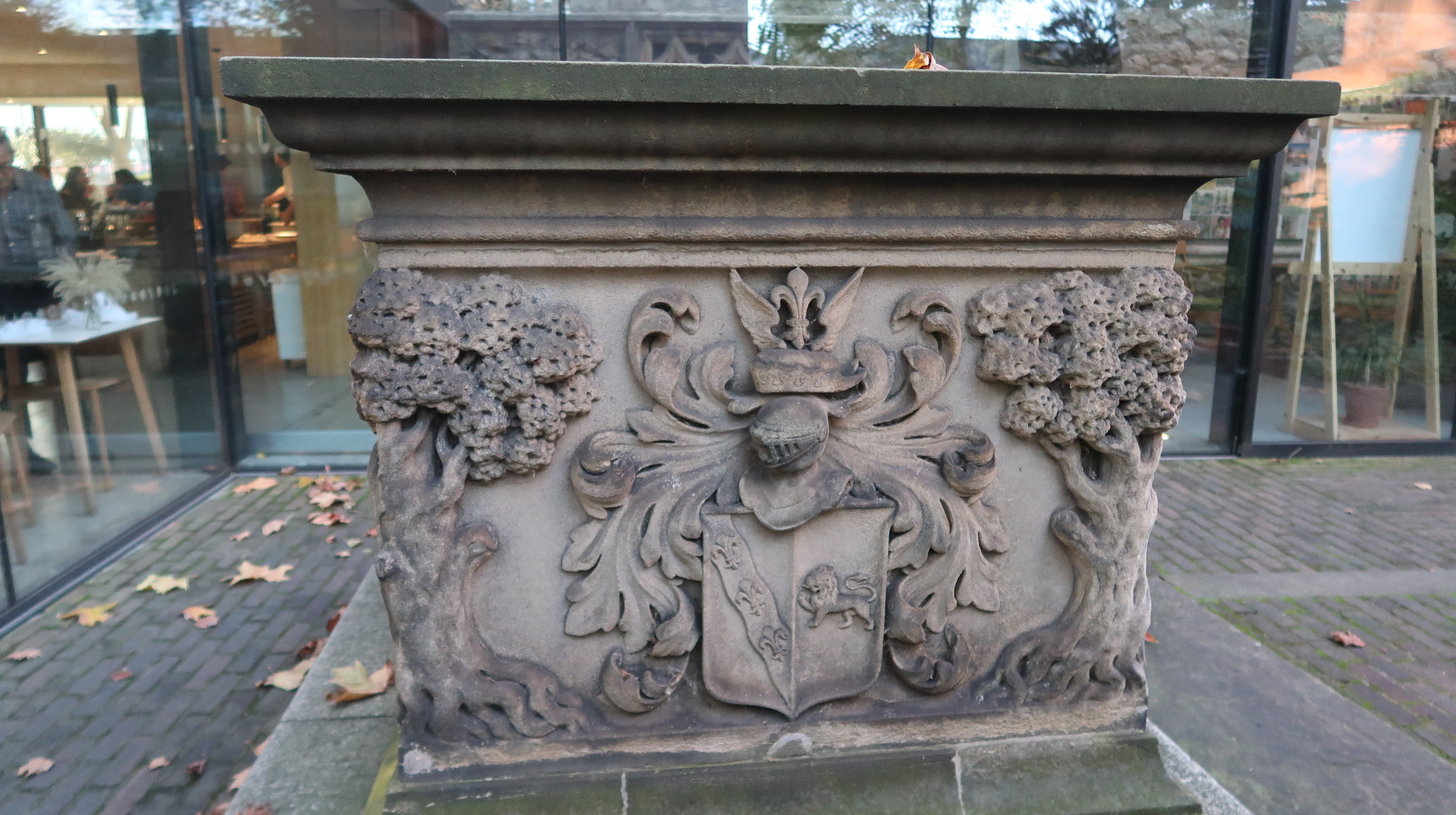
Tomb in the garden of the deconsecrated church of St Mary-at-Lambeth, next to the entrance of Lambeth Palace. London

Tradescant died on 22 April 1662, aged 53, in South Lambeth. He was buried beside his father in the churchyard of St. Mary-at-Lambeth which is now established as the Garden Museum.

== Legacy ==
He is the subject of the novel Virgin Earth by Philippa Gregory, sequel to Earthly Joys about his father. Tradescant is a character in Jeanette Winterson's novel "Sexing the Cherry."

The standard author abbreviation Trad. is applied to species he described.

John Tradescant the Younger is mentioned in Elizabeth Goudge's 1958 novel The White Witch (Part One, Chapter VI "Butterflies", Section 2). He is credited in the novel as the introducer of Michaelmas daisies Aster amellus to English gardens around 1632.

== Marriages and issue ==
1. Jane Hurte, died 1634
  1. John, died age 19
  2. Frances, married Alexander Norman
2. Ester (Hester) Pooks

== Gallery ==
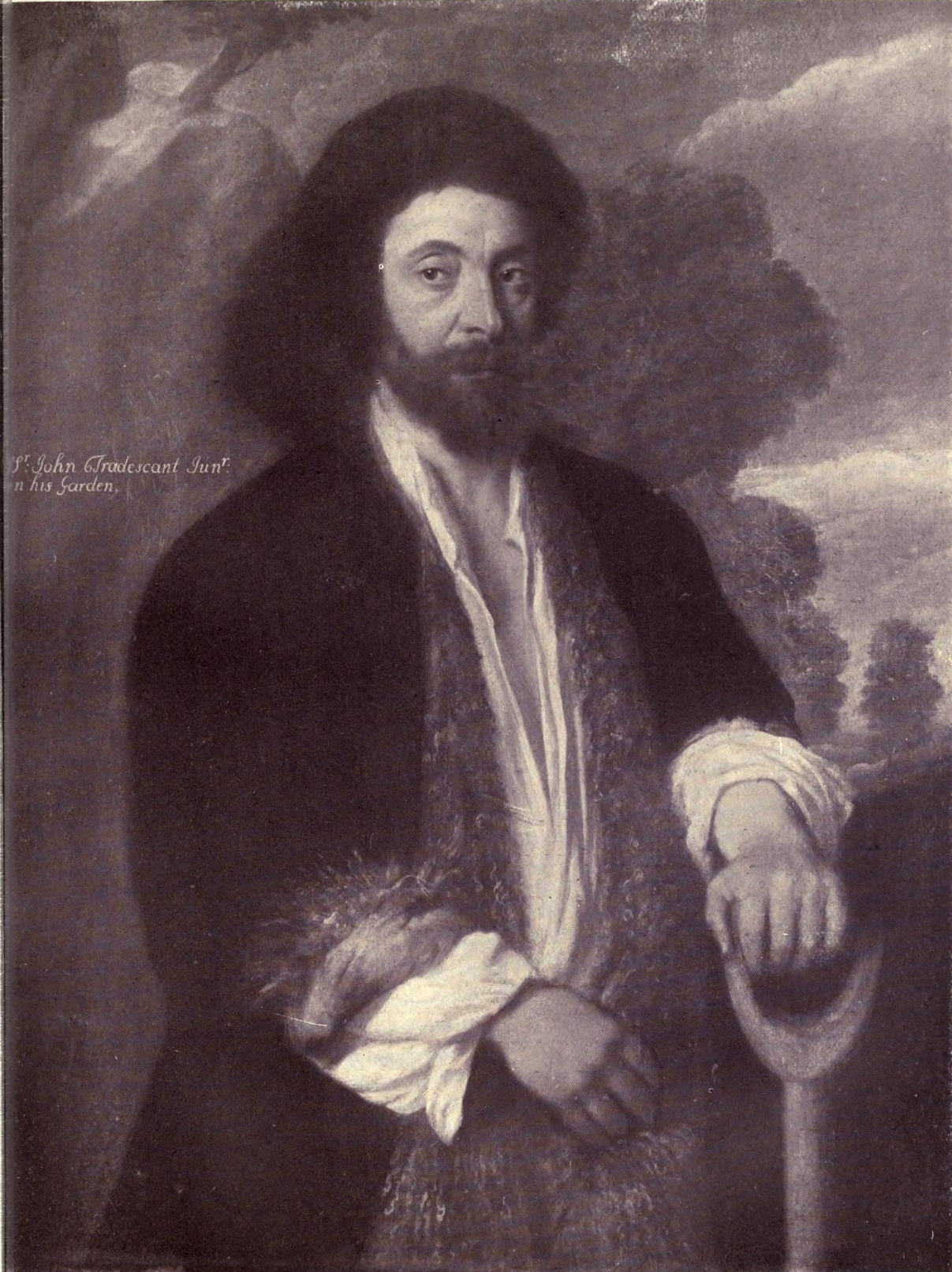
Portrait by William Dobson, circa 1720

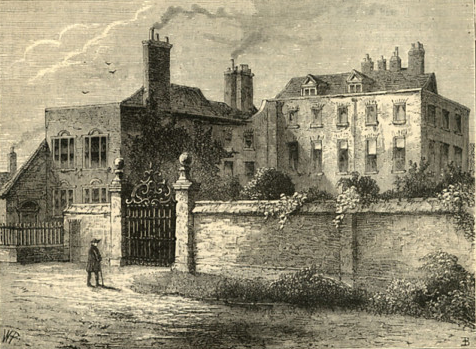
Tradescant's House, Lambeth

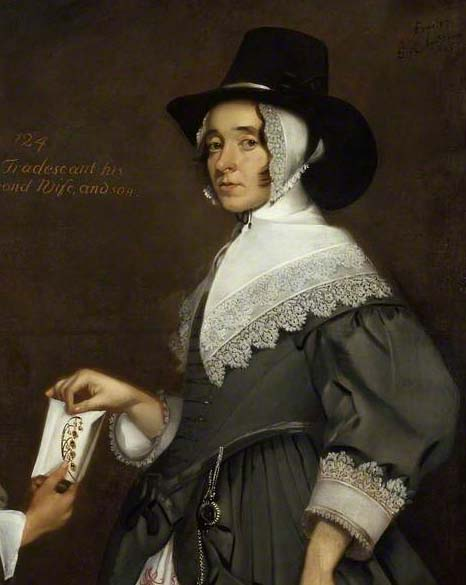
Ester, his second wife, by Thomas de Critz. Ashmolean Museum, Oxford

== Notes ==
Goudge, Elizabeth. The White Witch. Hodder & Stoughton, London, 1958.
