= John Wolfgang Rumler =

John Wolfgang Rumler (died c. 1650) was a German apothecary from Augsburg who served the English royal family in the households of Prince Henry, Anne of Denmark, King James and Charles I of England. He is also credited with making blackface theatrical grease-paint.

== Early life and education ==
Rumler's middle name was sometimes written as "Wolf" and he was sometimes known as "Master Wolf". His father was Macharius Rumler a merchant in Augsburg. His birth date is not known. The physician and writer Johann Udalric Rumler may have been his brother, and their similar names may lead to confusion. He was a son of Anna Gasser, a daughter of the physician and astrologer Achilles Gasser.

John Wolfgang Rumler, like many students of his time, kept a Liber Amicorum, a kind of autograph book, recording people he met during his travels and studies. He studied in Padua and Paris, and visited London. The book is dated 1602 and has the initials "J.W.R.A", the "A" standing for Augsburg. Rumler included a sketch of Elizabeth I and of the Earl of Essex. The book is now held by New York Public Library.

== Johann Udalric Rumler ==
Rumler's brother or relative Johann Udalric Rumler studied at various German and Italian universities, supported by Raymund Fugger, an Imperial Count of the mercantile patriciate of the Fugger family. Rumler received his MD from Caspar Bauhin in Basel. He served more than 33 years as a physician at the city hospital in Augsburg. He wrote up 100 medical cases, entitled Observationes medicae, some of which are dated between 1585 and 1595. Some of these have known medical importance, e.g. Observatio 46 heart block, or Observatio 81 aortic aneurysm, in which he references a letter by Vesalius to his grandfather Achilles Gasser.

== England ==
On 24 July 1604, John Wolfgang Rumler received a royal patent as apothecary to Prince Henry. On 26 November 1604, Anne of Denmark appointed him to provide sweet powders, waters, perfumes and other products. He also became apothecary to the English king and queen with an annual fee of £40 for each post. Rumler's 1606 bill for perfumes and rosewater supplied to Prince Henry over the past three years was certified by the queen's physician Martin Schöner.

On 25 June 1609, Rumler married Anna de l'Obel from Middelburg, Zeeland, a daughter of the Flemish physician and botanist Matthias de l'Obel, in the Huguenot French Protestant Church of London. In July 1610, Rumler and his wife were naturalized as English denizens at the same time as other members of the queen's household; Dorothea Silking and her sister "Engella Seelken" from Gustrow, Katherine Benneken from Garlstorf, and Martin Schöner. Another daughter of Matthias de l'Obel was married to Ludovic Myreus, Lewis Myres, a colleague of Rumler who also worked for Anne of Denmark. Anna Rumler (1576-1661), who married the queen's page Pierre Hugon may have been John Wolgang Rumler's sister. She attended the funeral of Anne of Denmark, listed as "Mrs Ann Rubellow" with the ladies of the Privy Chamber.

In 1613, after the death of Thomas Overbury, Rumler was questioned and testified that his brother-in-law Paul de l'Obel (1570-1621) had been appointed to make physic for Théodore de Mayerne because he lived on Lime Street near the Tower of London, at Mayerne's suggestion, and he had not recommended Paul L'Obel to the king for Overbury's physic.

In 1617, Rumler visited Scotland with the king, and went as far as Aberdeen where he and other courtiers including Edward Zouch, George Goring and Archibald Armstrong were made burgesses of the town. His fee in 1618 was set at £20 yearly.

In her final illness, Anne of Denmark sent a print of her portrait by Crispijn van de Passe to his brother or relative, the Augsburg physician Johann Udalricus Rumler, with a letter in Italian soliciting medical advice, and a miniature medical cabinet called a "pharmothecium". John Wolfgang Rumler took part in Anne of Denmark's funeral procession in 1619.

Anna Rumler, or the queen's "Danish Anna", Anna Kaas, and Piero Hugon were sent to the Tower of London for stealing the late queen's jewels.

== Competing apothecaries and perfumers ==
Rumler wrote to King James about George Shires or Shiers, a former servant of Master Morgan, an apothecary to the late Anne of Denmark. He alleged that Shires had overstated his qualifications to gain the post of "Sergeant of the Confectionary", and had become a "servitour odoriferous" to the king. Shires displaced John Clavie from his position, who allowed him to make waters, perfumes, and odours for the royal family and for the sweetening of linen. Rumler thought that Shires would try to obtain some of his duties. After Clavie died (in 1607), the king had given Rumler his role. The tone of the letter is comic. Shires was a "fresh water soldier" who did even trouble himself to follow the king's progresses. Rumler insisted that Shires was a crafty fox and the "Wolf" should be rewarded and not have to compete to supply the royal family.

In 1621 Rumler petitioned for relief on a bond on £300 contracted with the jeweler John Spilman and Elizabeth Weston, the wife of William Ripplingham.

== Argument at Kenilworth ==
On 20 August 1624 Rumler and Dr James Chalmers, a Scottish court physician, went to an inn called the Red Lion on the green by Kenilworth Castle. They were angry to find no food and drink and left saying they might as well burn the inn's sign. A bystander called Gilbert Tonckes joined in and criticised hospitality in Scotland, where it was thought there were few inns offering hospitality on the English model. Chambers and Rumler, as servants of the Scottish King James took exception to this. The argument was renewed in the evening. Tonckes' speech against the Scots was considered seditious and he was examined by a magistrate and begged for the king's mercy for himself and his wife. Rumler and Chambers had come to Kenilworth in the retinue of Prince Charles during his progress when Ben Jonson's, Masque of Owls was performed.

== Charles and Henrietta Maria ==
Subsequently, Rumler supplied perfumes and waters to Charles I, Henrietta Maria and their children, taking on the role of Jolliffe Lownes. He was appointed on 18 December 1626 to supply "perfumes, sweet powders, and other odoriferous things" to Henrietta Maria. Rumler and William Harvey attended Charles at Newmarket in 1633.

Rumler became a founder member of the Worshipful Society of Apothecaries.

== The Gypsies Metamorphosed ==
In the text of the "Windsor Epilogue" of Ben Jonson's 1621 masque, The Gypsies Metamorphosed, Rumler is said to have provided make-up to darken the actors' faces. He was described as "Master Wolf", the court "lycanthropos" or werewolf, and as a "mere barber".

The masque was produced by George Villiers, Marquess of Buckingham in celebration of his marriage to Lady Katherine Manners, first staged at Burley-on-the-Hill, and again at Belvoir Castle and Windsor Castle. The Gypsies of the masque are inhabitants of the Scottish borders. Rumler's innovative "ointment" was washed from the faces of the courtly masquers to reveal their true and stable noble identities. This theatrical makeup may also be considered as a contribution to the development of blackface.
