= Anna Kaas =

Danish lady in waiting

Anna Kaas was a Danish lady in waiting or chamberer serving Anne of Denmark, queen consort of James VI and I.

== Identity ==
Anna Kaas was a member of the Danish Kaas family and a relation of the politician Niels Kaas. She came to Scotland in May 1590 in the household of Anne of Denmark. She may have been the queen's personal maid and a lifetime servant of the queen.

In 1603, when Anne of Denmark came to England at the Union of the Crowns, it was said that she had only brought two aristocratic Scottish women with her. Dudley Carleton wrote that the queen said she had not been allowed more than two Danish attendants when she came to Scotland in 1590, to refuse various aristocrats who wished to join her. The remark seems to refer to Anna with a "Sophie Kaas" and Cathrina Schinkel, her principal attendants in 1590.

== Career in Scotland ==
At first, in Scotland, Anna Kaas was accompanied by Sophie Kaas, perhaps her sister, who was a connection of Breide Rantzau. Sophie was listed in a roll of the queen's household in 1591. She is identified as Sophie Eriksdatter Kaas, a daughter of Erik Kaas of Gjelskov and Anna Emmiksen, and a maid of honour to Anne of Denmark. Sophie Kaas intended to marry a Scottish courtier but he died before the wedding, and she returned to Denmark. Some older genealogies state that Sophie Kaas married the diplomat Andrew Sinclair, but his bride was her sister, Kirsten Eriksdatter Kaas.

A description of the coronation of Anne of Denmark on 17 May 1590 mentions that Anna Kaas and Cathrina Schinkel entered Holyrood Abbey in procession following the Scottish countesses attending the queen. It also mentions that Sophie Kaas and Cathrina Schinkel rode into Edinburgh in procession with the queen during her formal entry to Edinburgh on 19 May. Sophie Kaas was unmarried, described as a "Jomfru" and Cathrina or Karen Schinkel as a married woman, a "Fru".

Sophie Kaas and Cathrina Schinkel were called "her majesty's two Dutch gentlewomen" in the wardrobe account of 1590. They wore similar gowns, and their outfits reflected the queen's costume, with matching hats and taffeta hoods or caps made by another member of the household Elizabeth Gibb. In May 1593 Anna Kaas, described as "her majesty's maiden Anna", with Anna Meuteris and Christene Berie, the maidens or damsels of the queen's chamber, were given summer gowns of silk chamlet. The matching clothes highlighted group identity in the household.

The English ambassador Robert Bowes mentioned in a letter of July 1591 that the Danish diplomat Paul Knibbe arrived in Scotland with some Danish gentlemen who came to escort two of the queen's gentlewomen home. They brought another courtier, possibly Margaret Vinstarr. Possibly, Sophie Kaas and Cathrina Schinkel left Scotland at this time. Anna Kaas is thought to have remained with Anne of Denmark until the queen's death in 1619 and there are references to Danish or "Dutch" Anna which appear to refer to her. There were other women in the household called Anne or Anna, including Anna Meuteris, Danish "Little Anna" who married the preacher John Sering, the German Anna Rumler who married Piero Hugon, and for a time, the young Scottish courtiers Anne Hay and Anne Livingstone.

== In England ==
A "Dutch woman", usually thought to be Anna Kaas, attended the queen's deathbed at Hampton Court in 1619, accompanied by the French servant, Piero Hugon. "Mistress Anna" was said to have been given the queen's valuable linen at her death, despite being "so mean a gentlewoman". Soon after, "Dutch Anna" and Hugon were arrested for stealing some of the queen's jewels.

The date of the death of Anna Kaas is unknown.
