= Death and funeral of Anne of Denmark =

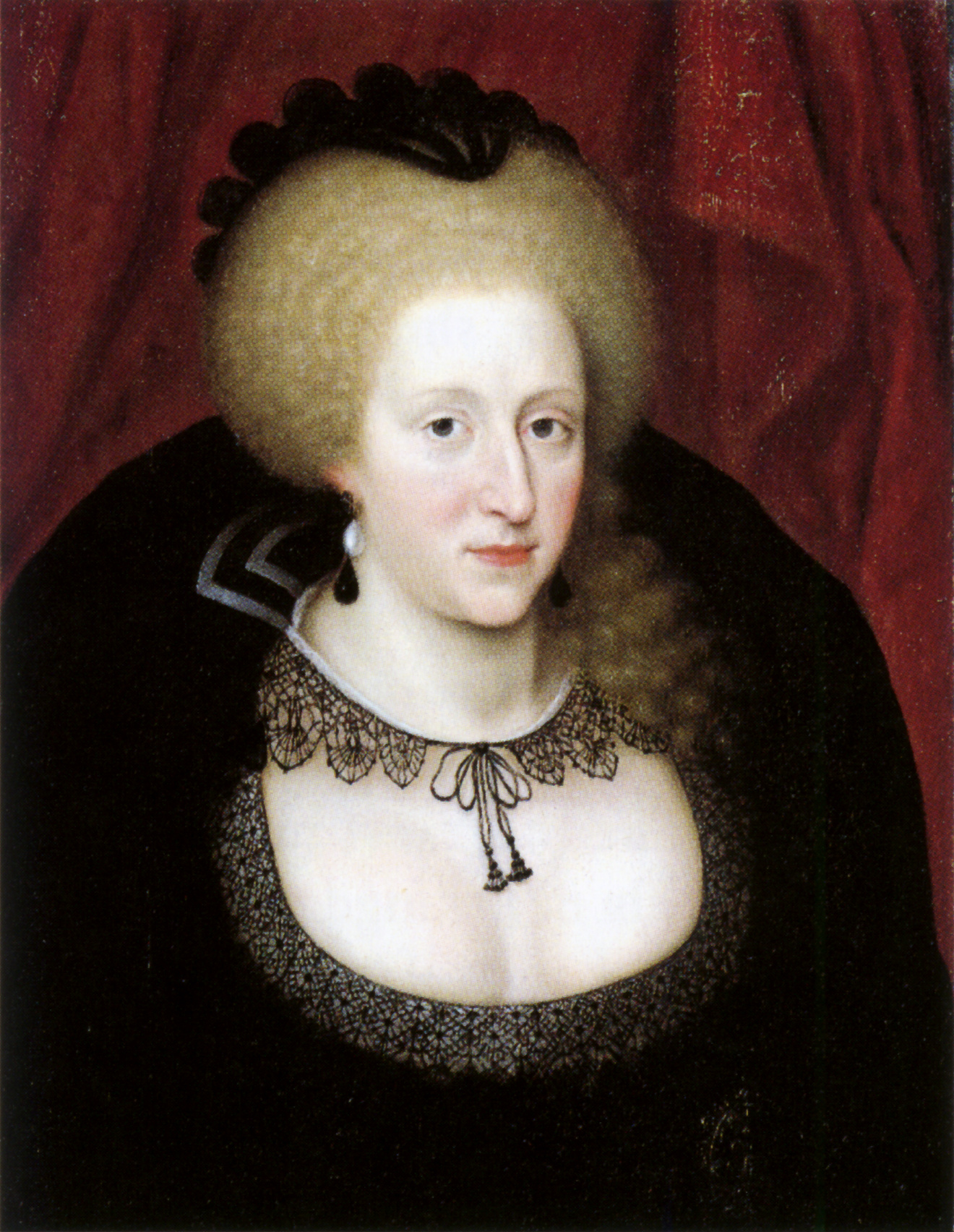
Anne of Denmark

Anne of Denmark (1574–1619) was the wife of James VI and I, and queen consort of Scotland from 1589, and queen consort of England and Ireland from the union of the Scottish and English crowns in 1603 until her death on 2 March 1619 at Hampton Court. She was buried at Westminster Abbey on 13 May.

== Final illnesses ==
Several letters mention the illnesses of Anne of Denmark and the royal physician Theodore de Mayerne left extensive Latin notes describing his treatment of Anne of Denmark from 10 April 1612 to her death. From September 1614 Anne was troubled by pain in her feet and swellings, which were a form of gout and dropsy and restricted her movements, as described in the letters of her chamberlain Viscount Lisle and the countesses of Bedford and Roxburghe. She was well enough to go hunting in August 1617, but later in the year, Anne's bouts of illness became debilitating. The letter writer John Chamberlain noted, "the Queen continues still ill disposed and though she would fain lay all her infirmities upon the gout yet most of her physicians fear a further inconvenience of an ill habit or disposition through her whole body."

Anne of Denmark received "great good" from recipes provided by Walter Raleigh, and wrote to King James in 1618 that he should not be executed. She had a nosebleed at Oatlands in September 1618 that confined her to bed and disrupted her travel plans. Lucy, Countess of Bedford, thought it had weakened her, and she appeared "dangerously ill". Still unwell at Hampton Court, she kept to her bedchamber and was attended by the physicians Théodore de Mayerne and Henry Atkins.

In November 1618, a comet was interpreted as a portent of her death, but she was reported to be in good health and had watched a fox hunt from her bedroom window. In December 1618, Frances Southwell, a gentlewoman of her privy chamber, wrote a note to Ralph Dison a keeper of Oatlands Palace, requesting a group of six paintings with religious subjects which Anne of Denmark wanted to display in her gallery at Hampton Court.

== Death at Hampton Court ==
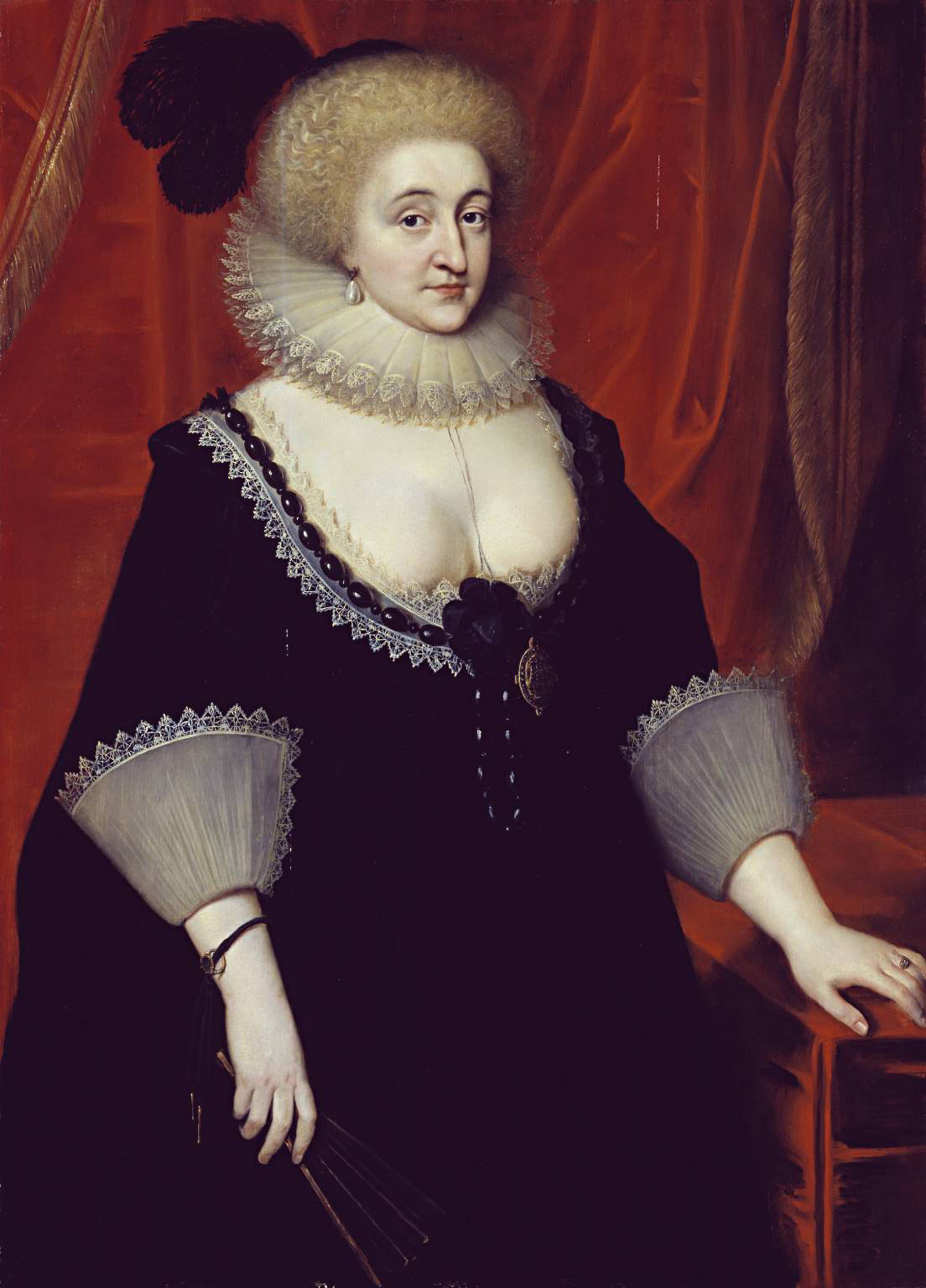
Elizabeth Grey, Countess of Kent, known as Lady Ruthin attended Anne at Hampton Court

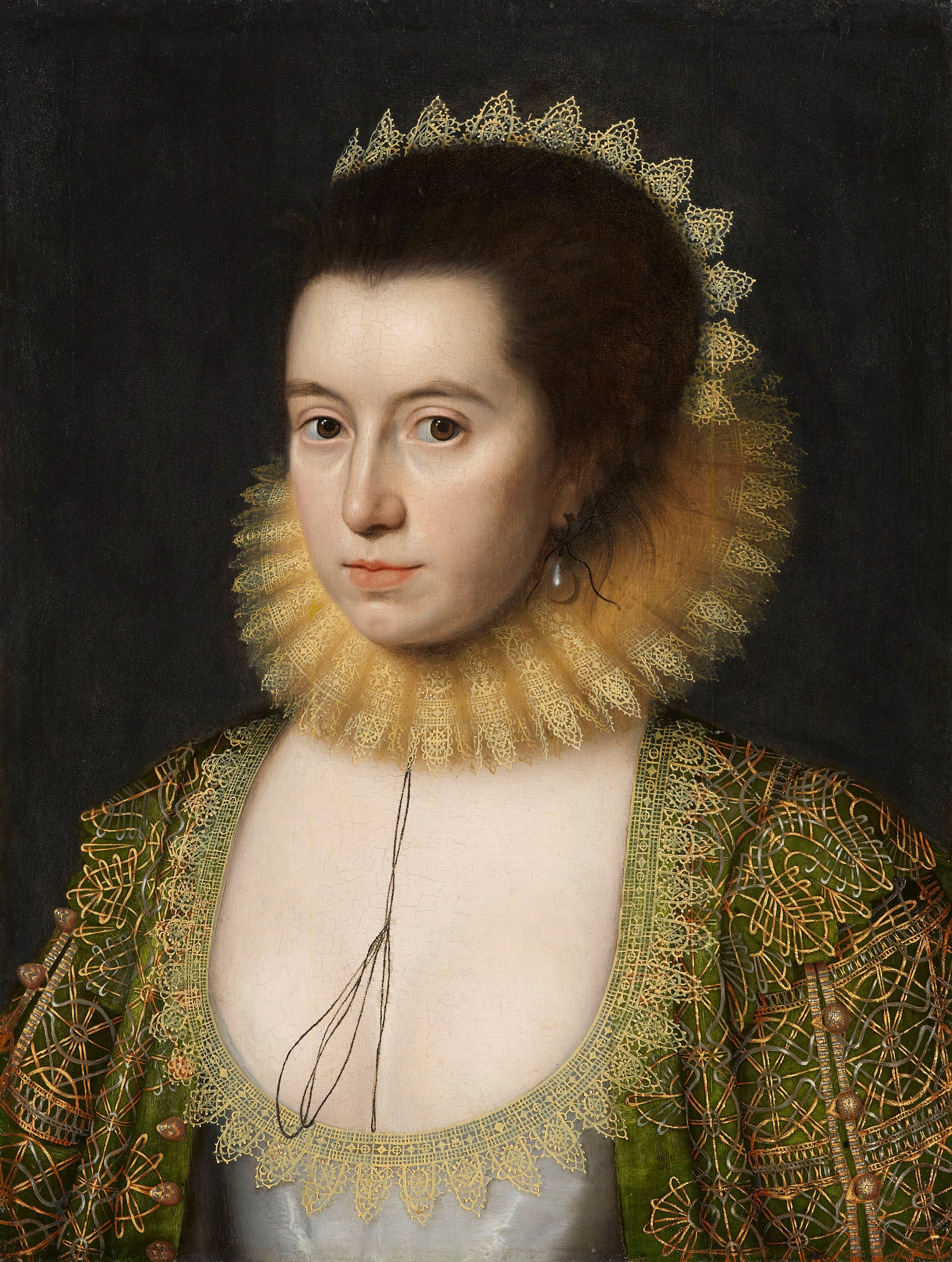
Lady Anne Clifford bought mourning clothes to watch the queen's body at Somerset House

In January 1619, Mayerne instructed Anne to saw wood to improve her blood flow, but the exertion served to make her worse. Mayerne attributed the queen's ill-health to her cold and northerly upbringing. Anne moved to Hampton Court and was attended by Mayerne, Henry Atkins, and, according to Gerard Herbert, Turner, a physician recommended by Walter Raleigh. Her brother, Christian IV of Denmark wrote to Mayerne, thanking him for his work. Christian IV also wrote to Anne's companion, Lady Grey of Ruthin, to encourage Anne who was thought to be melancholy and solitary. Gerrard Herbert wrote that Anne was in a "fairer way to recovery".

The queen's symptoms included a "flux" and a cough, which seemed to be a consumption. King James and Prince Charles were anxious that Anne should make a will, but she would not co-operate. According to a letter describing the queen's last days, "Pira, and the Dutch woman that serves her" were the queen's closest attendants at the deathbed, mostly excluding other courtiers from her presence. These two attendants were probably the French servant Piero Hugon and the Danish chamberer Anna Kaas. Named in an inventory as "Mr Pero" and "Mrs Hanna" they took delivery of furnishings sent from Oatlands Palace to Anne at Hampton Court.

Anne of Denmark died in the same room as Jane Seymour, where she had installed her favourite bed, after calling for a glass of Rhenish wine and then a glass of water. The ladies in waiting and female aristocrats attending in the final days were the Countess of Arundel, the Countess of Bedford, Lady Ruthin, Lady Cary, and the Countess of Derby. Danish Anna was with her at her last moments, and it was said the queen became blind shortly before her death.

== The comet ==
King James remained at Theobalds, and was unwell himself. He recovered and wrote a poem, comparing Anne's life to the appearance of the great comet in 1618:

Thee to invite the great God sent his star,
Whose friends they run the race of men and die
Death serves but to refine their majesty
So did my queen from hence her court remove
She's changed, not dead, for sure no good prince dies,
But as the sun, sets, only for to rise.

James Howell wrote "Queen Anne is lately dead of a dropsy in Denmark-house, which is held to be one of the fatal events that followed the last fearful comet that rose in the tail of the Constellation of Virgo".

== At Somerset House or Denmark House ==
Anne's body was embalmed by the apothecary Lewis Lemire and sealed in a lead coffin by Abraham Green, the sergeant plumber, and on 9 March taken by barge to Somerset House, sometimes called "Denmark House", where she lay in state attended by her ladies in waiting. The queen's lodgings were draped with black cloth and her bedchamber with black velvet. A tournament or tilt on 24 March to mark the anniversary of the accession of James VI and I was cancelled.

Lady Anne Clifford sat by the queen's body on 19 April, and afterwards took her cousin on a tour of the palace. She watched the body all through the night of 23 April, with Lady Elizabeth Gorges and others.

A large of number of heraldic pennants and banners were made by the workshop of the painter John de Critz for use at Denmark House and at the Abbey. The display included the arms of the House of Oldenburg and her wider family connections. There had been a similar display celebrating her ancestry and lineage outside St Giles at her Scottish coronation in May 1590.

== Funeral ==
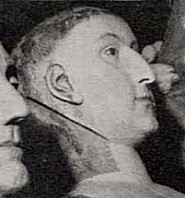
Funeral effigy of Anne of Denmark.

King James ordered the funeral should be "most honourably solemnized and in such manner in all things as was Queen Elizabeth's late Queen of England". The cost of the funeral has been estimated at £30,000. The expenses were managed by Lionel Cranfield, and the costs of black mourning cloth seem to have been the cause of the delay, until 13 May.

Maximilian Colt made a life-like effigy of the queen for use at Denmark House and during the service in Westminster Abbey. The naturalistic effigy, called a "representation" was clothed in crimson robes and a crimson velvet gown, and a "pair of bodies" or stays. The crown and a sceptre for the effigy were probably painted and gilded by John de Critz. Dorothy Speckard dressed the effigy's head with a veil edged with lace. The costume of this "representation" was perfumed by Mary Cob with musk, civet, and ambergris.

The "hearse", the catafalque, used in the funeral in the Abbey, was also designed by Colt. This was destroyed during the English Civil War. Inigo Jones had provided an alternative design with more complex sculptural symbolism than Colt's. Benjamin Henshawe, a silkman, provided gold fringes and trimmings for the velvet cushion on the hearse, on which the effigy was placed.

During the planning of the funeral, the Scottish courtier Margaret Howard, Countess of Nottingham was considered as the chief mourner, but other aristocrats including Alethea Howard, Countess of Arundel and Dorothy Percy, Countess of Northumberland refused to give her precedence. One solution suggested was to make Helena, Marchioness of Northampton the chief mourner. The Earl of Nottingham had been Admiral, the highest rank in the nobility, and there was now talk of making him "Constable of England". The Countess of Arundel was appointed as Chief Mourner.

The procession from Denmark House to the Abbey included her household and many aristocratic women, all dressed in black mourning clothes in quantities and qualities according to their status. Also present and dressed in black were the queen's jewellers, George Heriot, William Herrick, John Spilman, and Abraham Harderet, and the painters Peter Oliver, Marcus Gheeraerts, and Paul van Somer, and many of the artificiers and tradesmen who had contributed to the magnificence of her court.

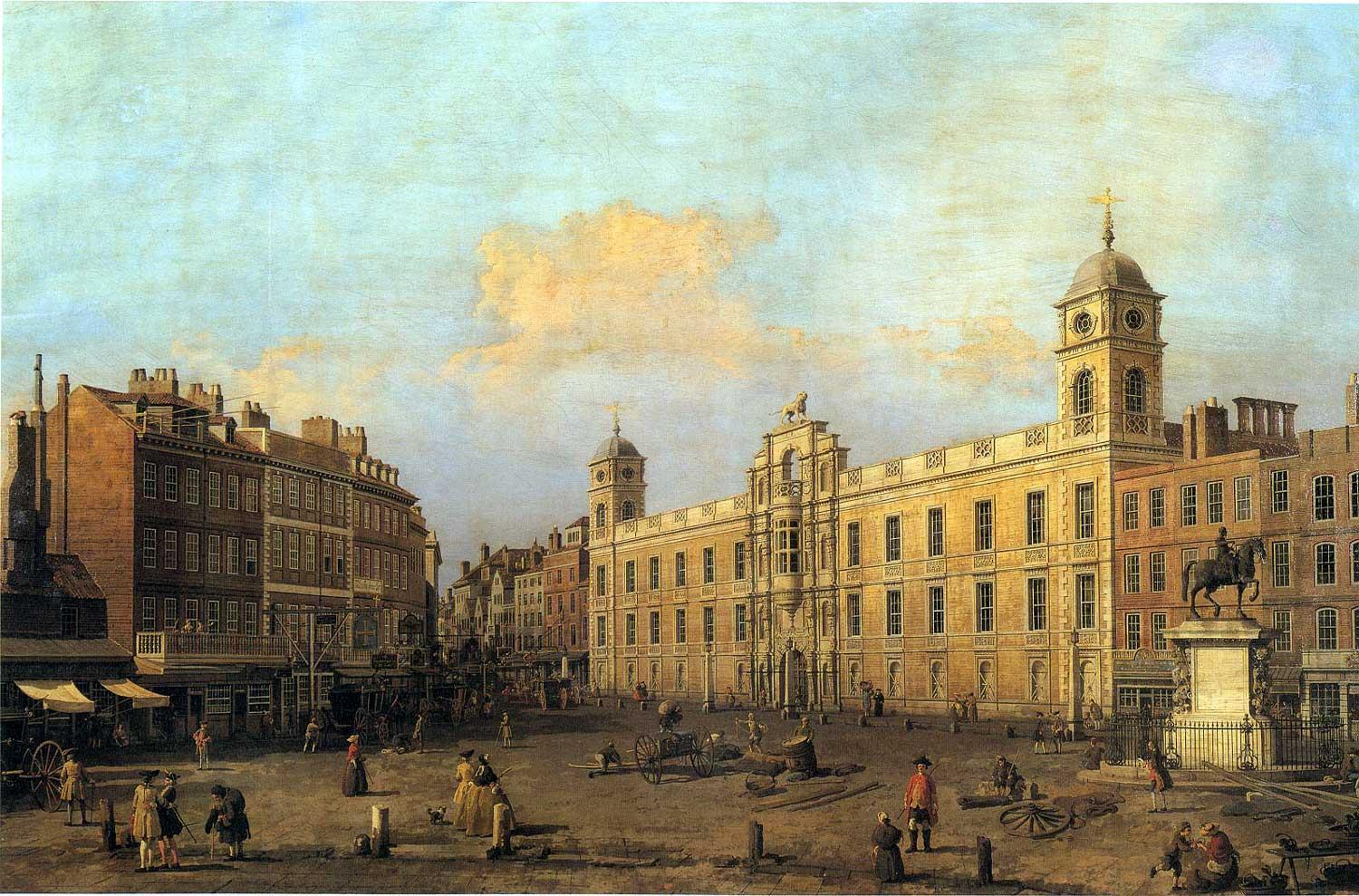
Spectators dislodged masonry from the balustrade of Northampton House during the funeral procession.

John Chamberlain provided a satirical account of the procession, "a drawling tedious sight", "laggering all along, even tired by the length of the way and the weight of their clothes, every lady having twelve yards of broadcloth about her and the countesses sixteen". Another spectator, William Applegard of Lynn, was killed by a piece of masonry falling from Northampton House. According to Nathaniel Brent, the stone was a letter "S", a part of a motto forming the roof-line balustrade, and was "thrust down by a gentlewoman who put her foot against it, not thinking it had been so brickle" [brittle]. Brent was impressed by the "excellent equipage" of the chariot carrying the queen's effigy through the streets of London. He also reported that the ceremonies and heraldic duties were better performed than at the funeral of Prince Henry's funeral, but the procession was not so great as that at the funeral of Elizabeth I. Although the numbers of mourners in black was large, the king's servants had not joined the procession.

The sermon was given by the Archbishop of Canterbury, George Abbott. Anne of Denmark's body was buried privately in the evening at Westminster Abbey on 13 May, after the funeral, by the Knight Marshal Edward Zouch.

During works in the Abbey in 1718, the antiquary John Dart saw a labelled urn containing the embalmed organs of Anne of Denmark, which he thought had been moved in 1674 during the reburial of the Princes in the Tower. The urn was first deposited in the vault on 5 March 1619, after Anne was embalmed.

King James remained at Greenwich Palace while Prince Charles attended the funeral. Sir Edward Harwood summed up the day, "the Queen's funerals were yesterday solemnised, not exceeding expectation, and yet great".

== Aftermath ==
Soon after Anne's funeral, King James had her jewels brought in carts from Denmark House to Greenwich Palace. "Dutch Anna" and Hugon were arrested for stealing some of the queen's jewels. The jewels were recovered in Paris by Edward Herbert, who made a detailed inventory.

A number of suppliers and artisans petitioned for payment, including Blanche Swansted a hair dresser who had attended the funeral. The furniture painter and gilder, Thomas Capp and seven associates petitioned King James for payment of £1600 for household work supplied to the queen. His co-petitioners were; William Thompson, joiner; Isobell Shawe and Christopher Shawe, embroiderers; Jasper Heely, silkman; John Salusbury, Thomas Edwards and Gilbert Hart upholsterers. Cranfield was later accused of profiting from the sale of black cloth.
