= Elias Le Tellier =

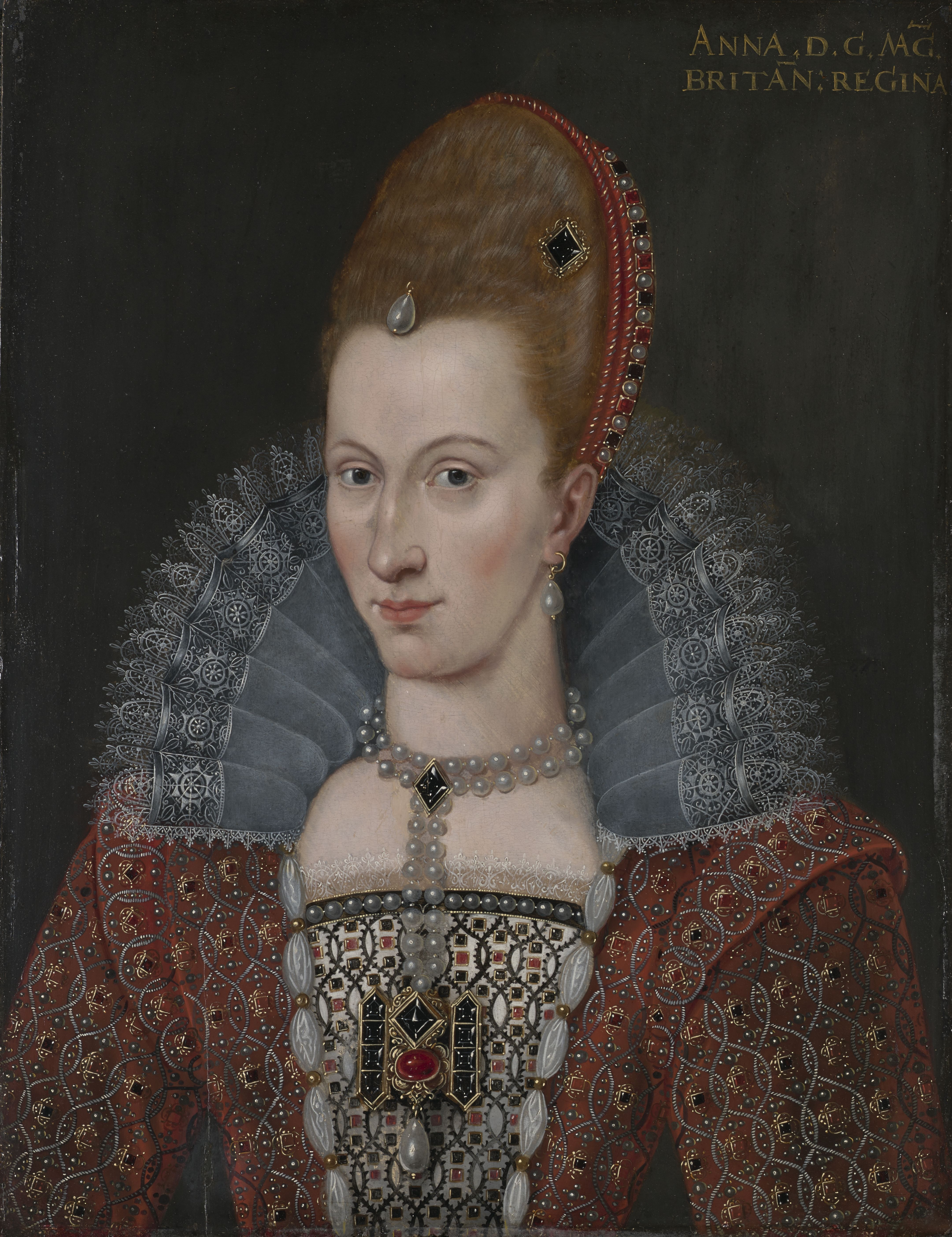
Elias Le Tellier and his wife Esther Le Tellier worked for Anne of Denmark

Elias Le Tellier was a French goldsmith who worked for Anne of Denmark in Edinburgh and moved to London at the Union of the Crowns in 1603. His first name was sometimes recorded as "Elie", as the French form "Élie", and his last name written as "Laiteller" or "Taylor".

== Career ==
In 1597, Elias Le Tellier carried messages and money for the English ambassador in Scotland Robert Bowes in association with Bowes's servant Christopher Shepherdson. The money was a reward from Elizabeth I for Andrew Knox. In July 1597, George Heriot was appointed goldsmith to Anne of Denmark. According to Robert Birrel's Diary, Heriot displaced a French goldsmith called "Clei", pehaps a reference to "Élie". Anne of Denmark had previously employed a German-born goldsmith Jacob Kroger.

At the same time, James or Jacques Le Tellier worked as a goldsmith for James VI. The historian Winifred Coutts discovered court records mentioning the Le Tellier and Des Granges families, which possibly indicate that they faced difficulties as foreign workers in Edinburgh's Canongate. They were not members of the Edinburgh incorporation of Goldsmiths. Elias is described as "Elias Litillier, Frenchman goldsmyth to the Quenis Majestie". Elias and his son Harry Le Tellier, with a colleague Samson des Granges, quarrelled with an Edinburgh goldsmith, James Crawfurd. Anne of Denmark's chamberlain, the master of work, William Schaw was able to intervene in the legal action resulting from their feud.

Elias Le Tellier lived in a tenement in the Canongate and the owner, a merchant Robert Johnston, sought to have him and his wife and children evicted. James Le Tellier twice attended baptisms as a witness in the Canongate in 1600 and 1601. Elias Le Tellier and his wife Esther moved to London at the Union of the Crowns. He was made a denizen of England in December 1605, and gave his place of birth as Dieppe. He resided at Charing Cross and at St Giles in the Field, and continued to be associated with George Heriot. Mary Smith from Southwark was accused of stealing part of a silver salt and two spoons from him.

Samson des Granges, whose father Nicolas was from Guernsey, also moved to London and was the father of the painter David des Granges. In London, Anne of Denmark bought fabrics from "Elias Tillier" or "Filliar", a linen draper.

=== Esther Le Tellier ===
Elias' wife Esther des Granges or Hester Le Tellier was a silkwoman to Anne of Denmark. She came to London in 1603, and accounts record that she delivered "diverse parcels of lawn, cambric, needlework, purls, bone lace" and other materials to the lady in waiting Jane Drummond.

In 1606 she received an annual wage of £20. She was a member of the Granges family and has been identified as the aunt of the painter David des Granges. She attended his christening in 1611. The registers of the French Church in Threadneedle Street also show that she attended christenings with the goldsmith Abraham Harderet. In 1613, Elias and Esther tried to recover money they had lent to James Douglas of Spott by appealing to the Privy Council of Scotland. "Mrs Tillier", with the hairdesser Blanche Swansted and others, took part in the funeral procession of Anne of Denmark in 1619.
