= John de Critz =

English painter (1551/1552–1642)

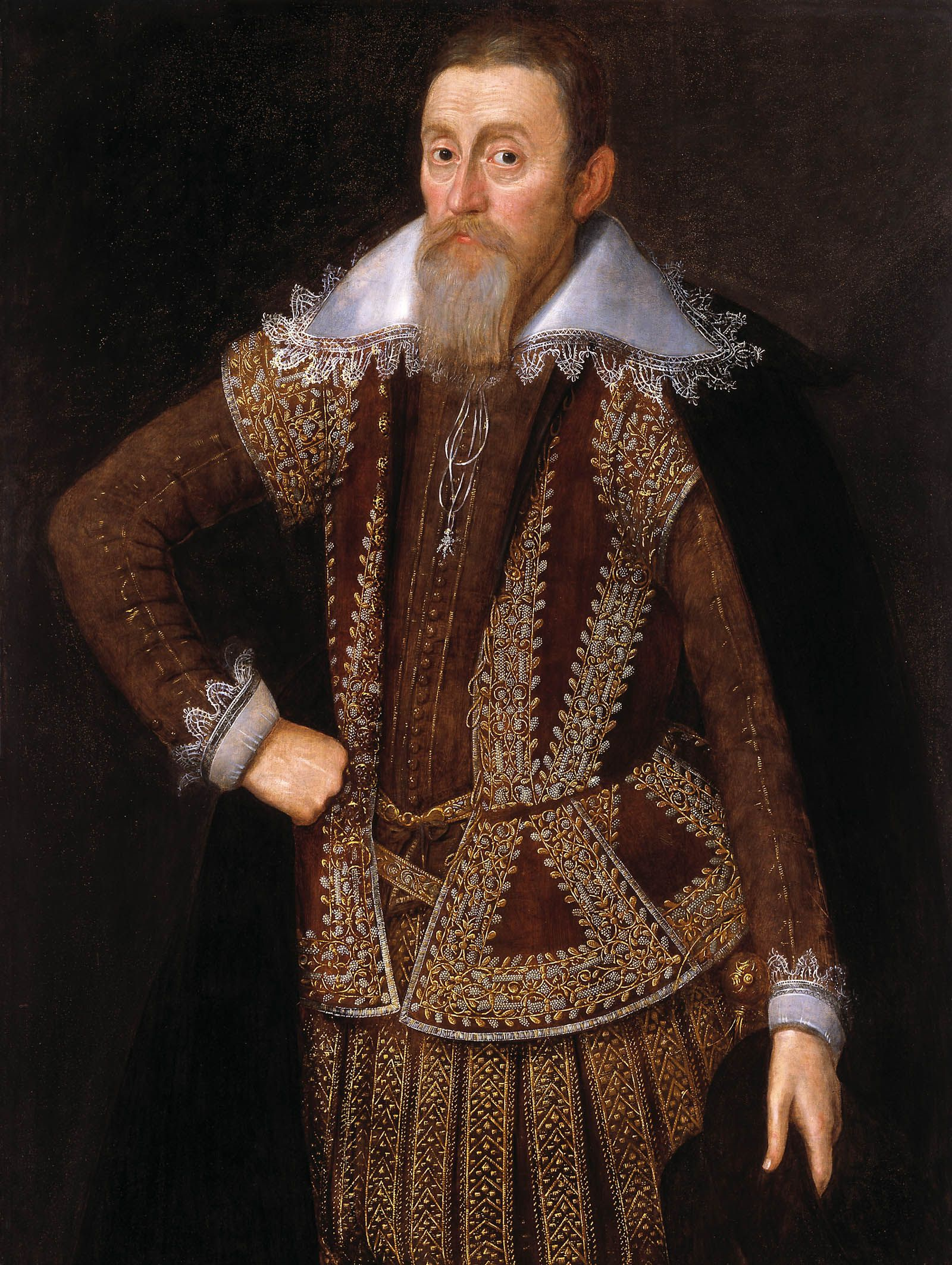
William Parker, 4th Baron Monteagle. Attributed to John de Critz, c. 1615.

John de Critz or John Decritz (also "De Critz", 1551/2 – 14 March 1642 (buried)) was a Flemish portrait painter active at the English royal court during the reigns of James I of England and Charles I of England. He held the post of Serjeant Painter to the king from 1603, at first jointly with Leonard Fryer and from 1610 jointly with Robert Peake the Elder.

His son John de Critz the Younger was also a painter in England, so the father is often referred to as John de Critz the Elder.

== Family ==
John de Critz's father was Troilus de Critz, a goldsmith from Antwerp, where he was born. His Flemish parents brought him as a boy to England, during the Spanish persecution of Protestants in the Habsburg Netherlands. He was apprenticed to the artist and poet Lucas de Heere, a Flemish painter from Ghent, who may have taught members of the Gheeraerts family and Robert Peake as well.

De Critz had established himself as an independent artist by the late 1590s.

His sister Magdalena married Marcus Gheeraerts the Younger, another Flemish court painter, who may also have been a pupil of de Heere. De Critz was succeeded as Serjeant Painter by his son John the Younger (b. before 1599), who had been involved in the work for many years—his father died at about 90. John the Younger was killed shortly afterwards in the fighting at Oxford. Other painters from the family include John the Elder's sons Emmanuel (1608–65), who also worked for the court, and Thomas (1607–53), to whom many portraits of their Tradescant relations are now attributed. Thomas also worked for the Crown between 1629 and 1637. Oliver de Critz (1626–51) was a son of John the Younger by his third wife; his portrait in the Ashmolean Museum may be a self-portrait.

== Life and work as a Serjeant Painter ==
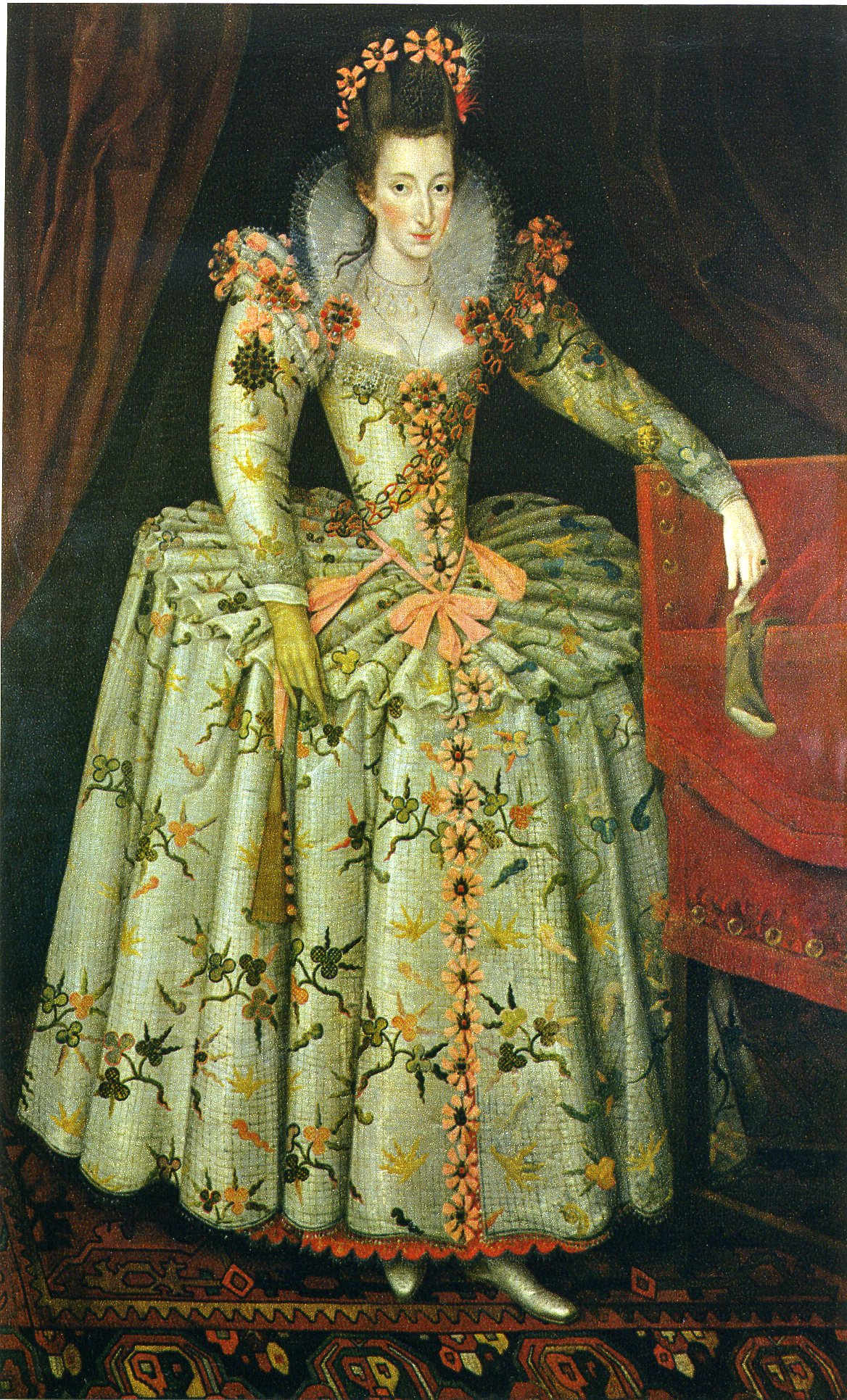
Anne Vavasour, her first lover was Elizabethan courtier and poet Edward de Vere, 17th Earl of Oxford, by whom she had a son. For that offence, both were sent to the Tower of London by the orders of Queen Elizabeth. She was the inspiration, protagonist, and possibly the actual author, of the poem, Anne Vavasour's Echo. Painting attributed to John de Critz, c. 1605

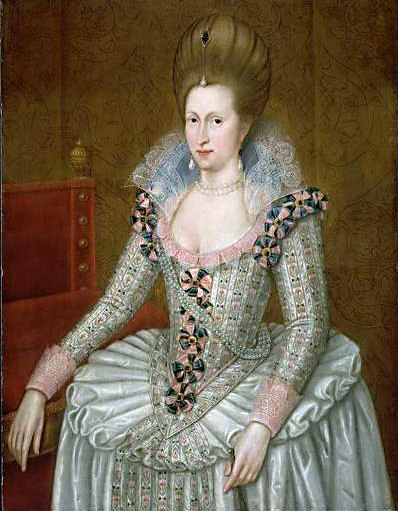
Anne of Denmark, John de Critz, c. 1605

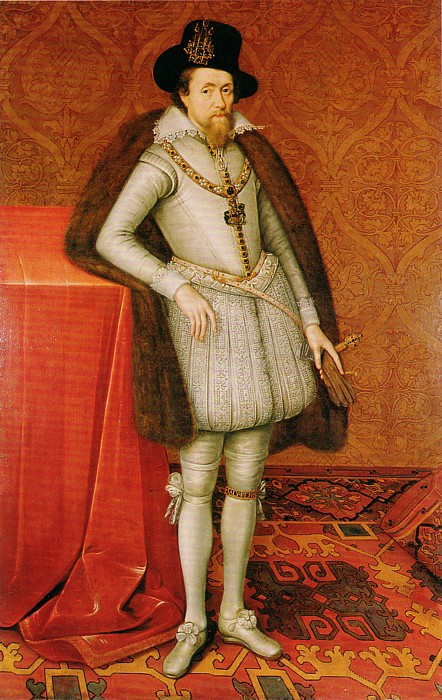
James I, attributed to John de Critz, c. 1606

John de Critz was appointed Serjeant Painter to the king in 1603. De Critz's duties as the Serjeant Painter entailed making portraits, the restoration of the decorative detail, the painting and guilding of royal coaches and barges, and individual tasks such as painting the signs and letters on a royal sun-dial. He also painted "bravely" for court masques and dramatic spectaculars which required elaborate scenery and scenic effects.

The post of serjeant-painter came into being with the appointment of John Browne in 1511–12, and the last known holder was James Stewart, of whom no records are available after 1782, though it is not clear whether the post was ever actually abolished. A patent issued on 7 May 1679 for Robert Streater, gives a list of previous serjeant-painters, including "John Decreetz & Robert Peake" as joint-holders of the post. De Critz was given the post in 1603 but is first described as sharing the office with Leonard Fryer, who had held it since 1595. Robert Peake the Elder was appointed jointly with de Critz in 1607, or 1610. A payment made to de Critz in 1633 shows that he was paid a retainer of £40 a year.

The role of the serjeant painter was elastic in its definition of duties: it involved not just the painting of original portraits but of their reproductions in new versions, to be sent to other courts. King James, unlike Elizabeth, was markedly averse to sitting for his portrait. In August 1606 de Critz was paid £53-6s-8d for full length portraits of James, Anne of Denmark, and Prince Henry to send to the Archduke of Austria. The sergeant-painters copied and restored portraits by other painters, and undertook decorative tasks including scene painting and the painting of banners.

Horace Walpole provided information about some of the tasks de Critz performed in his Anecdotes of Painting in England, which he based closely on the notes of George Vertue, who had met acquaintances of de Critz and his family. Walpole quoted from a scrap of paper, a "memorandum in his own hand", on which de Critz wrote bills for jobs completed. On one side was his bill for work on a sun-dial:

For several times oyling and laying with fayre white a stone for a sun-dyall opposite to some part of the king and queen’s lodgings, the lines thereof being drawn in severall colours, the letters directing to the bowers guilded with fine gould, as alsoe the glory, and a scrowle guilded with fine gould, whereon the number and figures specifying the planetary howers are inscribed; likewise certain letters drawne in black informing in what part of the compasse the sun at any time there shining shall be resident; the whole worke being circumferenced with a frett painted in a manner of a stone one, the compleat measure of the whole being six foote.

On the other side is a demand for payment for work on the royal barge:

John De Critz demaundeth allowance for these parcells of Worke following, viz. For repayreing, refreshing, washing and varnishing the whole body of his Majesty’s privy barge, and mending with fine gould and faire colours many and divers parts thereof, as about the chaire of state, the doores, and most of the antiques about the windowes, that had bene galled and defaced, the two figures at the entrance being most new coloured and painted, the Mercury and the lion that are fixed to the sternes of this and the row barge being in several places repayred both with gould and colours, as also the taffarils on the top of the barge in many parts guilded and strowed with fayre byse. The two figures of Justice and Fortitude most an end [sic] being quite new painted and guilded. The border on the outside of the bulk being new layd with faire white and trayled over with greene according to the custom heretofore—and for baying and colouring the whole number of the oares for the row barge being thirty-six.

John de Critz's final bill for painting these barges and their carvings by Maximilian Colt in 1621 was over £255. Walpole noted that John de Critz painted a gilded "middle piece" for a ceiling at Oatlands Palace, repaired pictures, and decorated royal carriages: "To John De Critz, serjeant-painter, for painting and gilding with good gold the body and carriages of two coaches and the carriage of one chariot and other necessaries, 179l.3s.4d. anno 1634."

In 1606, De Critz decorated the new Banqueting House at Whitehall Palace. De Critz gilded Maximilian Colt's marble effigy for the tomb of Elizabeth I, completed in 1606, which had been painted by Nicholas Hilliard. All traces of the painting and gilding have now disappeared. Later in the same year he painted and gilded the tomb of Princess Sophia.

In 1611 he decorated a fireplace for Anne of Denmark's "tiring chamber", her dressing room at Somerset House, with various kinds of marbling and imitation stone. He painted "antique work" in Anne of Denmark's apartment in Whitehall Palace, and in 1614 painted black and white marble in the chapel at Oatlands. De Critz and his workshop painted heraldic banners for the funeral of Anne of Denmark in 1619, which were displayed at her lying in state at Somerset House and at Westminster Abbey. He seems to have painted the crown and a sceptre for her funeral effigy.

Walpole said of de Critz that "His life is to be collected rather from office-books than from his works or his reputation"; and the comparative mundanity of some of the tasks he undertook has led to a downplaying of the artistic role of the serjeant-painter. Art historian William Gaunt describes de Critz's role as "mainly that of a handyman". A Burlington Magazine editorial remarked: "A great deal of easy fun has been poked at the institution of the serjeant-painters, because these had to attend to tasks such as downright house-painting, the painting of barges and coaches, the provision of banners and streamers, and so on".

It is not certainly known where in London de Critz had his studio, but he moved to the parish of St Martin-in-the-Fields before his death in 1642. He stated in his will that he had previously lived for thirty years in the parish of St Andrew, Holborn. George Vertue recorded there had been three rooms full of the king’s pictures at de Critz’s house in Austin-friars. De Critz was entered in a subsidy roll for the parish of St Sepulchre-without-Newgate in 1607 and again in 1625; and since this parish adjoins St Andrew, Holborn, he possibly had his studio in St Sepulchre. He died in London in 1642; the exact date is unknown.

== Royal Portraits and the Spanish Embassy of 1604 ==
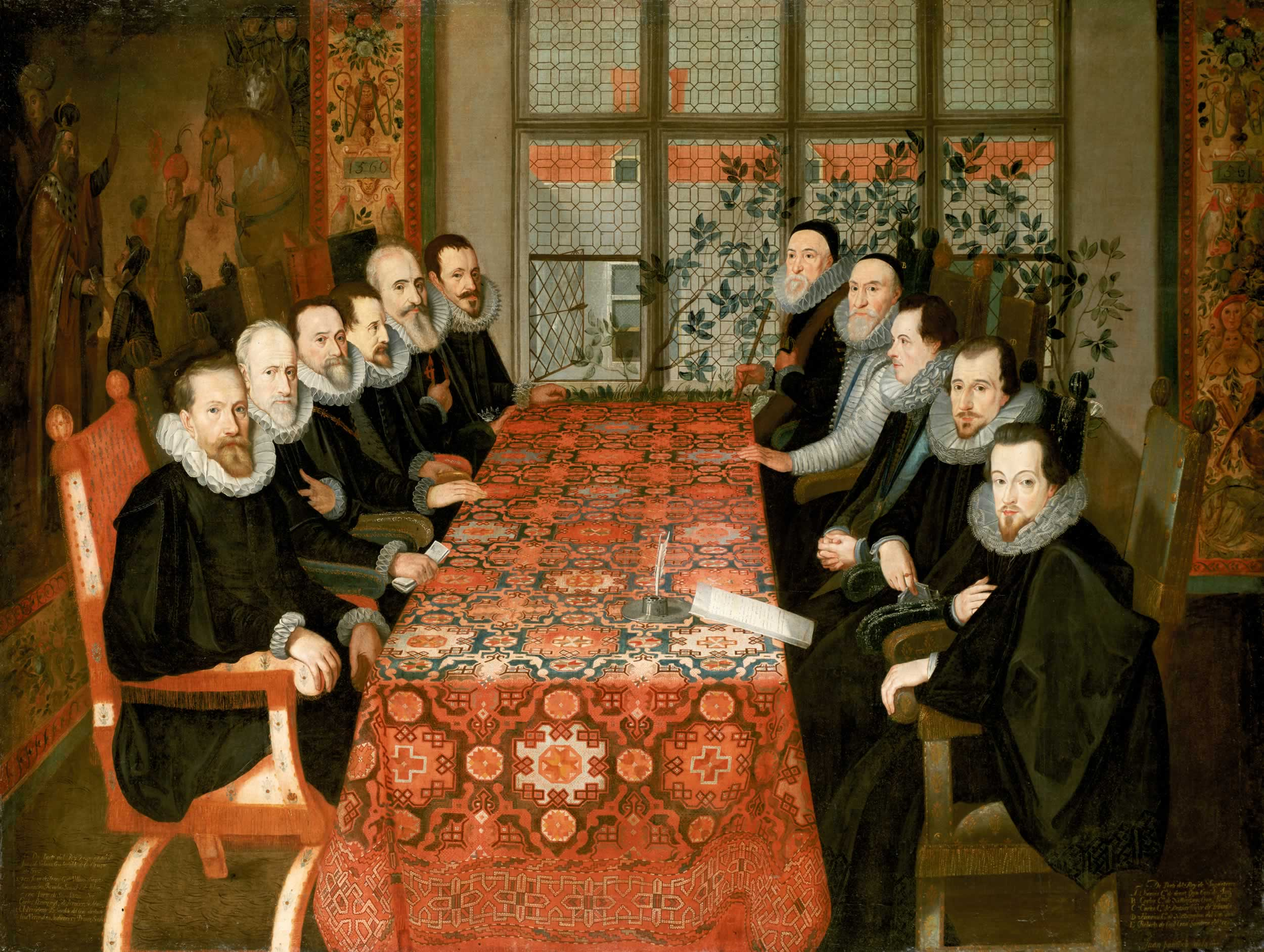
The Somerset House Conference, painted ?1604. National Portrait Gallery, Robert Cecil is seated front right

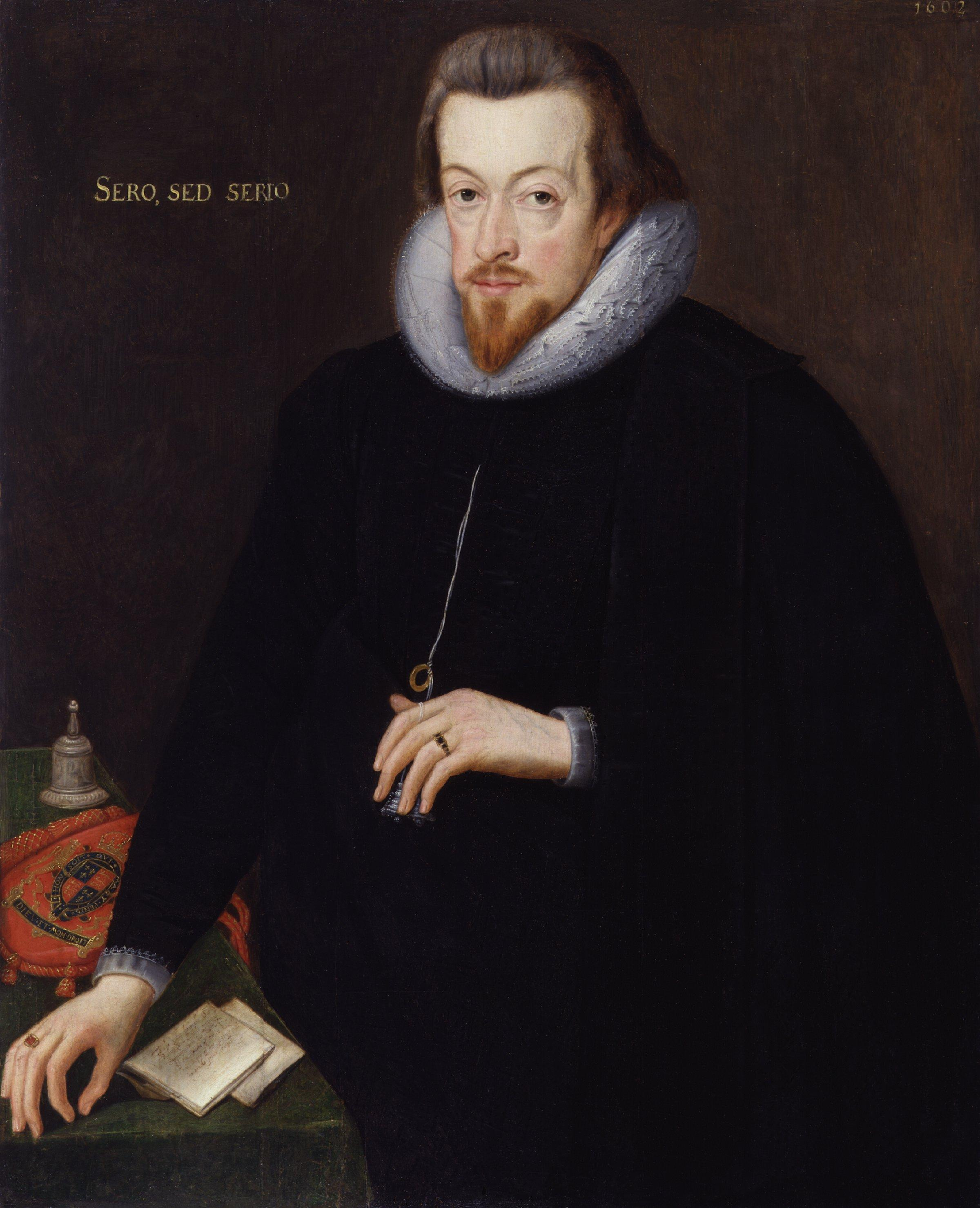
Robert Cecil, later 1st earl of Salisbury, attributed to John de Critz, 1602.

Although de Critz was a prolific painter, few of his works have been clearly identified. Elizabethan and Jacobean portrait painters often made multiple versions not only of their own paintings but of those of their predecessors and contemporaries, and rarely signed their work. Portraits by different artists often share poses or iconographical features. Although many paintings are attributed to de Critz, full authentication is unusual. The art historian and critic Sir John Rothenstein summed up the problems:

To make definitive attributions is a difficult undertaking. This is due to a variety of causes, the most important being the practice of successful painters of employing assistants. Another confusing factor is the tendency on the part of members of the artistic families to intermarry with one another; Marc Gheeraerts the elder and his son and namesake, for example, both married sisters of John de Critz.

As part of the monarchy's advancement of its political and dynastic aims, copies of standard portraits were required for presentation as gifts and transmission to foreign embassies. De Critz was commissioned to make such portraits, including portraits of King James, Anne of Denmark, and Prince Henry, for £53-s-8d on 20 August 1606, to be sent to the Archduke of Austria.

Gustav Ungerer has studied the interchanges of portraits, jewellery and other gifts during the negotiations and celebrations which surrounded the Treaty of London, a peace treaty signed with Spain in August 1604 during the conference at Somerset House, when diplomatic exchanges of miniatures and full-length portraits took place in a sustained show of brilliant self-representation. Ungerer discusses the contested authorship of the famous painting of the two sets of negotiators sitting opposite each other at the conference table, The Somerset House Conference, a work in which John de Critz may have had a hand, either directly or as a source for the copying of figures.

Both versions of the painting, at the National Portrait Gallery and National Maritime Museum, Greenwich, are signed by the Spanish court painter Juan Pantoja de la Cruz. However scholars disagree about whether he was the artist since, although the signatures appear authentic, he was never in London. It is possible that either the works are by a Flemish artist, possibly Frans Pourbus, or John De Critz, or were copied by Pantoja from a Flemish artist who was in London at the time. Pantoja may have worked up the likenesses of the English negotiators by "copying the faces of the delegates either from miniatures or from standard portraits given to him or to the constable in London or sent to Valladolid...He obviously used a Cecil portrait as model for The Somerset House Conference which was Cecil's standard type of portrait attributed to John de Critz". It is certainly on record that the leader of the English negotiating team, Sir Robert Cecil, gave the leader of the Spanish negotiators, Juan Fernández de Velasco, 5th Duke of Frías and Constable of Castile, his stock portrait as duplicated in the workshop of John de Critz. Pantoja's depiction of Charles Howard, earl of Nottingham, also looks as if it has been duplicated from a standard portrait. Apart from the heads, the picture shows signs of workshop painting by assistants, perhaps revealing that numerous versions were produced, as there would have been many demands from those involved for duplicates of the painting, for purposes of historical record. The painting sheds light on the piecemeal process of constructing group portraits at this time.

== See also ==
- Artists of the Tudor court
