= Thomas de Critz =

English painter

Thomas de Critz (1 July 1607 – 22 October 1653) was an English painter.

He was born in London, the son of the Flemish-born painter John de Critz. He worked for the English court and was entrusted with the restoration and cleaning of Charles I's paintings. Decritz also painted the coffered ceiling of the 1653 Double Cube Room at Wilton House, showing the story of Perseus.

Thomas de Critz died in London.

== Gallery ==
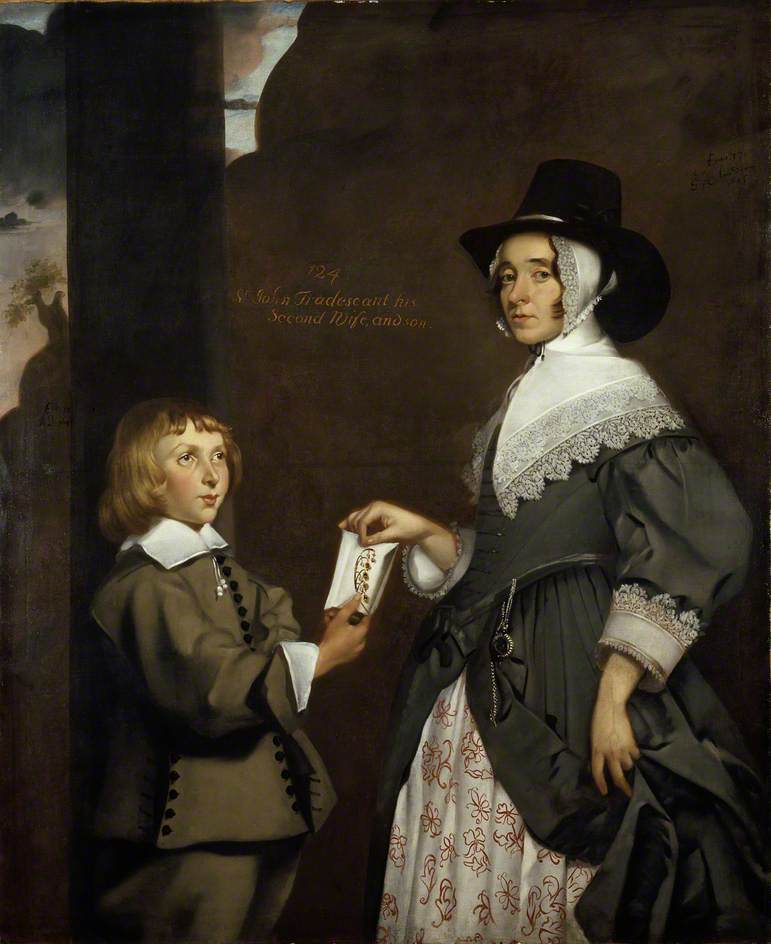
Hester Tradescant and her stepson John Tradescant III, attributed to Thomas de Critz

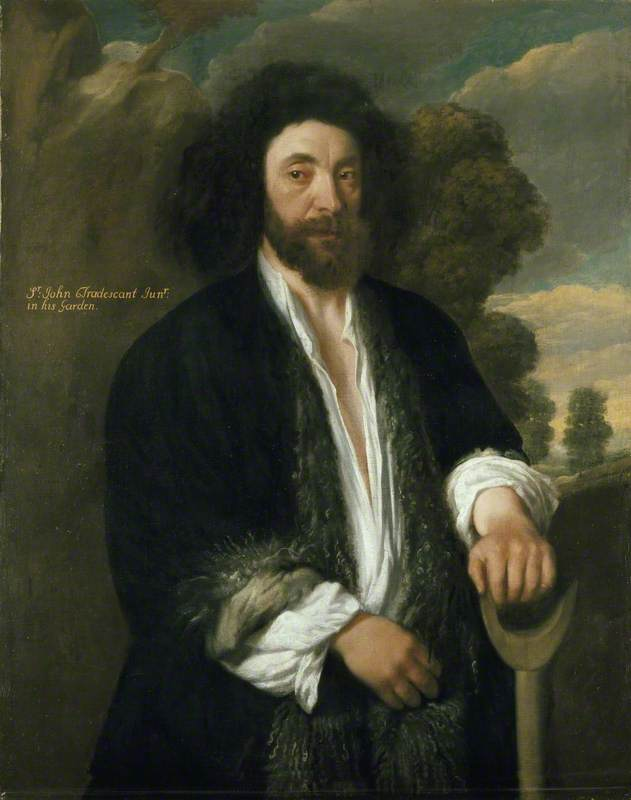
John Tradescant the Younger (1608–1662), attributed to Thomas de Critz

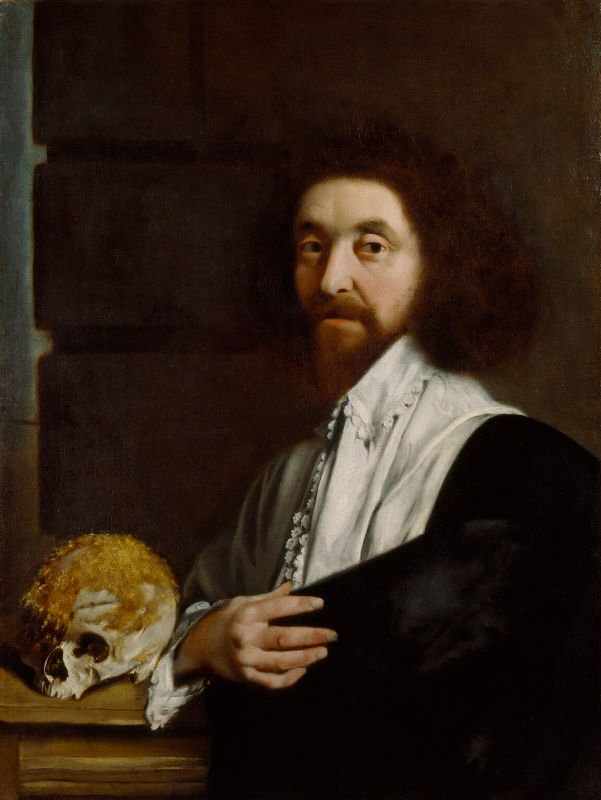
John Tradescant the Younger

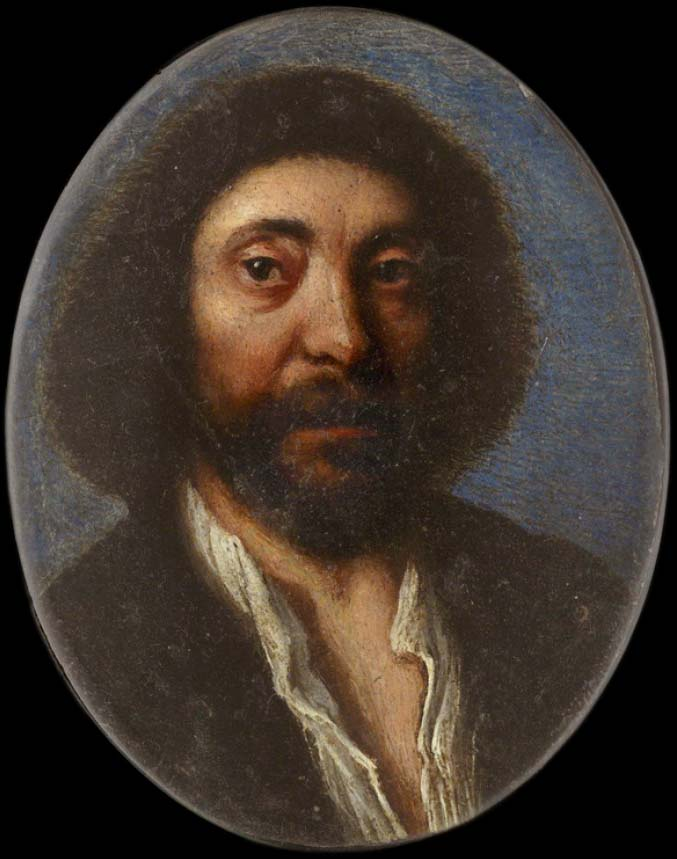
John Tradescant the Younger

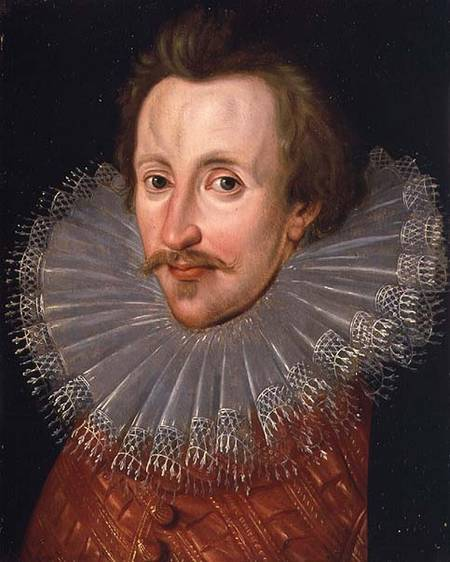
Posthumous portrait of Sir Philip Sidney (1554–1586)
