= Blanche Swansted =

Royal hairdresser

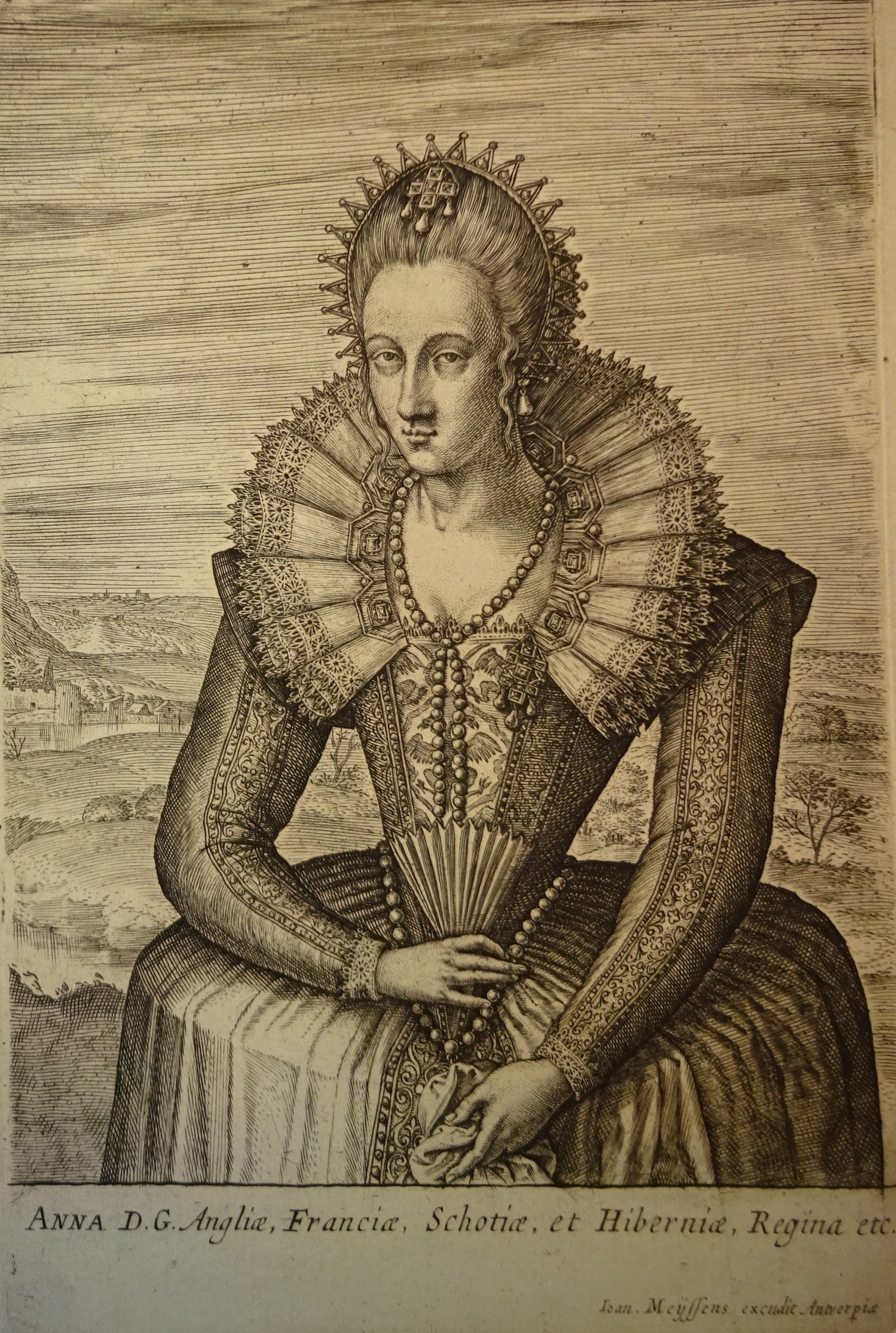
Anne of Denmark wearing an "attire".

Blanche Swansted or Swanstead was a hairdresser, tirewoman, and perruquière to Elizabeth I, Anne of Denmark, and Princess Elizabeth. In May 1603, she travelled to Berwick-upon-Tweed to meet Anne of Denmark, the queen consort of James VI and I.

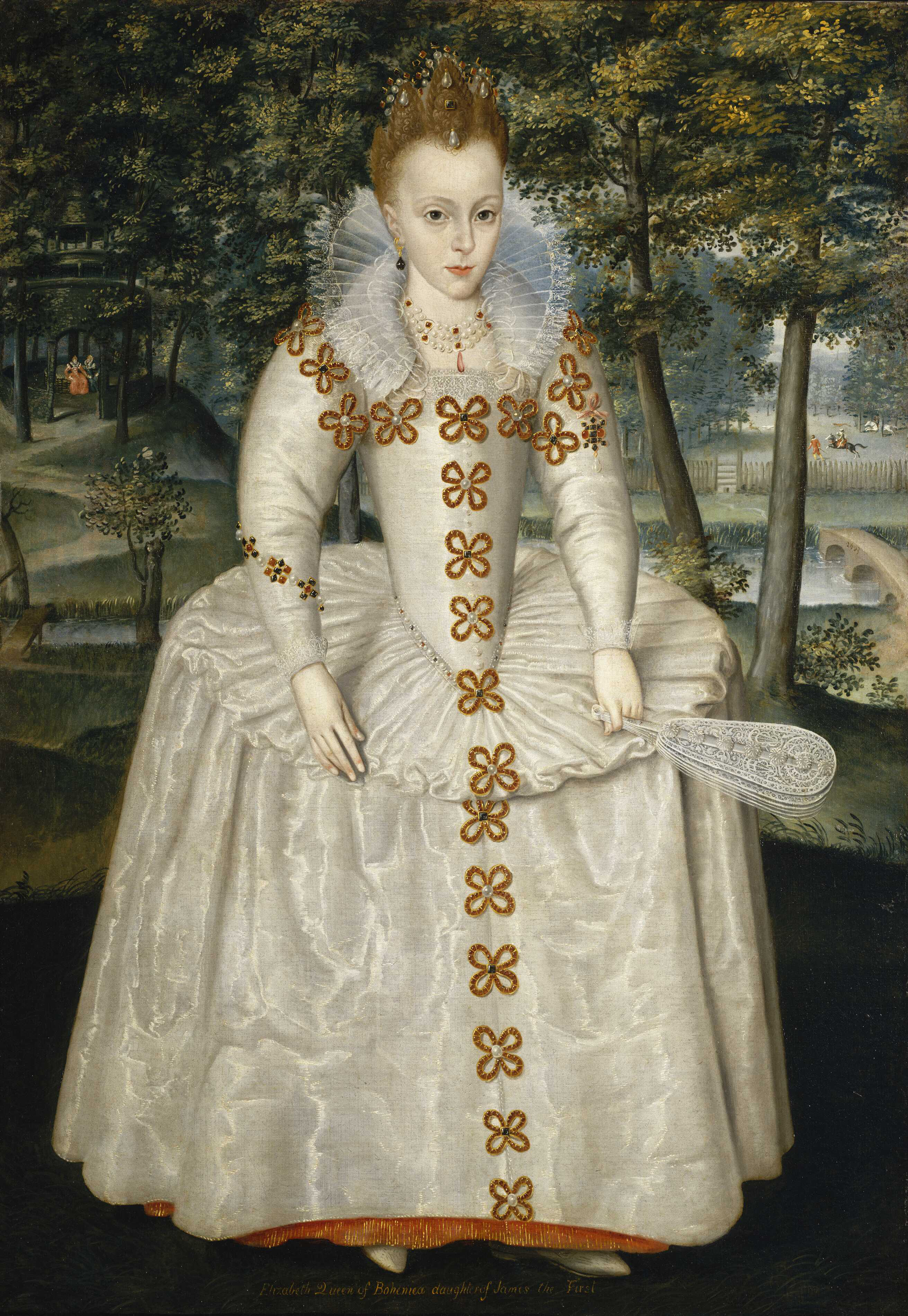
Princess Elizabeth wears a pearl tire

A tire was a dressing for hair including a wire frame, jewels, and ribbons. Much of what is known about Blanche Swansted comes from the petitions she wrote for payment following the death of Anne of Denmark in 1619 and in 1620s. She had been a tirewoman to Princess Elizabeth and had a fee of two pence daily.

The petition in The National Archives gives more information on her career. At the Union of Crowns in 1603, James VI and I travelled to London from Scotland, leaving Anne of Denmark and his children in Scotland. In April 1603 he ordered that some of Elizabeth's jewels, and a hairdresser, Blanche Swansted, should be sent to Berwick-upon-Tweed so that Anne of Denmark would appear like an English queen as she crossed the border. James reiterated this request, explaining the jewels were to be selected by Elizabeth's household attendants for Anne's "ordinary apparelling and ornament". Swansted's petition for payment explains that she had travelled north to meet the new queen and joined her service as "tirewoman in ordinary".

Anne of Denmark appointed a Scottish "attire-maker" James Taylor, confirmed by privy seal letter on 17 May 1603 in Edinburgh.

A young Scottish woman in Princess Elizabeth's household in England, probably Anne Livingstone, kept an account book. She wore the same hairstyles as the Princess, and bought "a tire of pearl to wear on my head", "a wire to my head with nine peaks" and, "a periwig of hair to cover the wire" and, "a French wire to my head with an hoop of hair". She paid for "dressings" to be made up with emeralds, pearls, garnets, green silk and feathers. The pearls and precious stones were her own. Swansted or another tire-maker got between 9 and 20 shillings for making these dressings, depending on how much material they added and sold. Swansted's annual wage in Princess Elizabeth's household was £9-2s-6d.

In December 1617, the Venetian ambassador Piero Contarini described the appearance of Anne of Denmark at Somerset House. Her hair was dressed with diamonds and other jewels and was extended in rays, or like the petals of a sunflower, with artificial hair. Blanche Swansted appears in a version of Anne's household roll written in French in 1619, listed as "Dame Suanstel, perruquiere". With the silkwoman Esther Le Tellier and others, she took part in the funeral procession of Anne of Denmark in 1619.
