= Emmanuel de Critz =

English painter

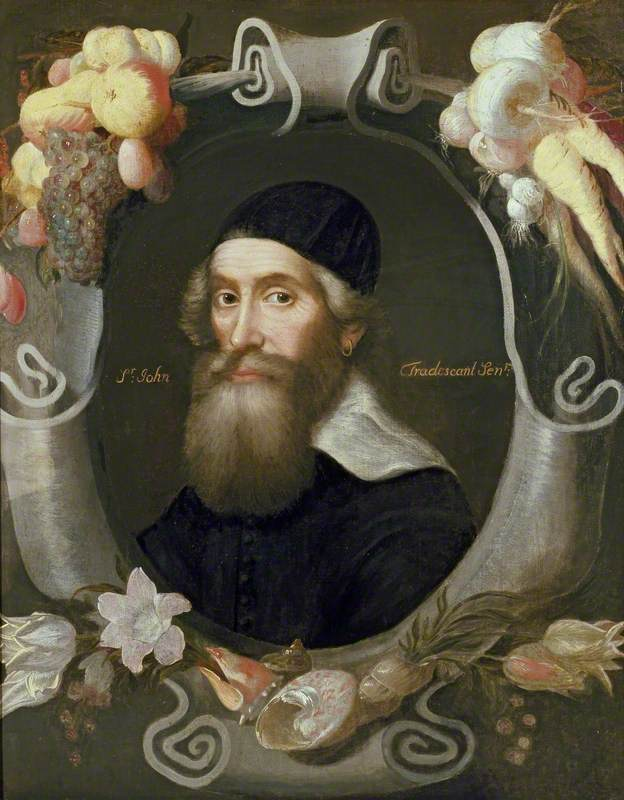
John Tradescant the Elder, attributed to Emmanuel de Critz

Emmanuel de Critz (25 September 1608 – 2 November 1665) was an English painter. He was called the "best portraitist in London" by Robert Walker.

He was born and baptized in London on 25 September 1608, as the younger son of John, a painter of Flemish origin active at the English royal court during the reigns of James I of England and Charles I of England, who held the post of Serjeant Painter to the king.

He painted scenes for masques, at the time very popular at court. In 1657 he made a portrait of Sergeant Sir John Maynard.

He is considered the author of the central ceiling panels with the Perseus narratives in Wilton House.

In 1650 he purchased a considerable number of artworks after the dispersal of the collection of Charles I. He kept his acquisitions in his house in Austin Friars. However, some items acquired by Critz (perhaps including Bernini's Bust of King Charles I) were apparently blocked by Oliver Cromwell, with de Critz petitioning the council in 1660. At the Restoration he then petitioned the king for reimbursement.

In the latter part of his life he lived in the parish of St. Margaret's, Westminster. He was buried there on 2 November 1665.

A son or nephew of his was also a painter.

== Gallery ==
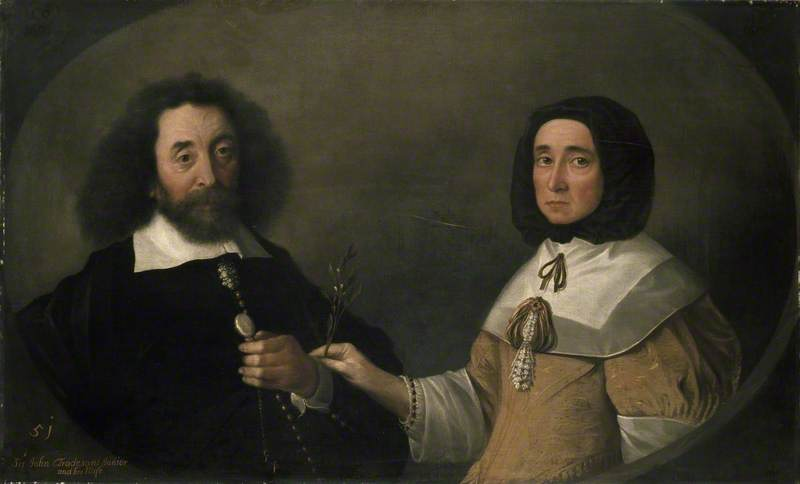
John Tradescant the Younger and Hester, attributed to Emmanuel de Critz

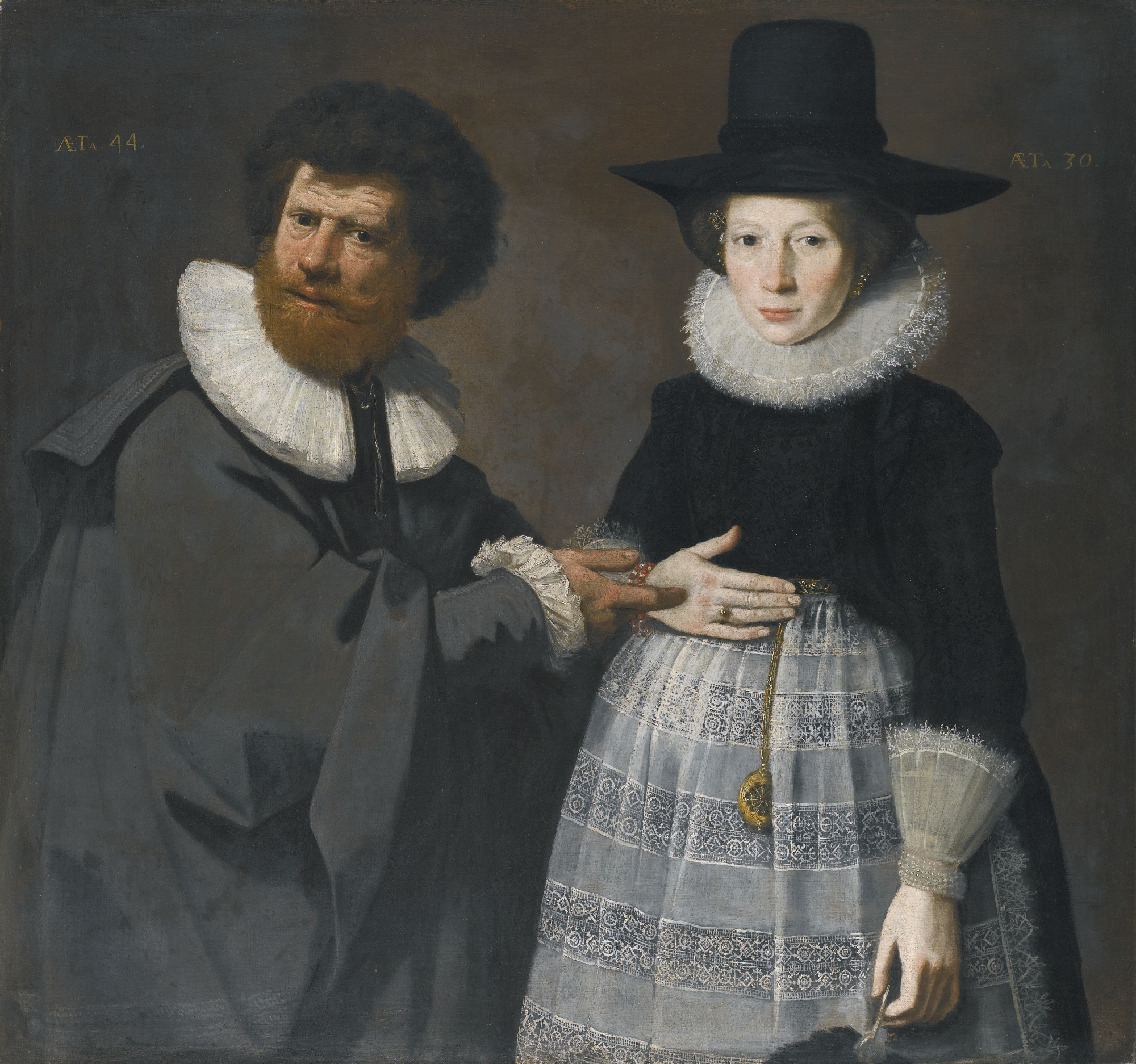
Portrait of a lady and a gentleman, attributed to Emmanuel de Critz
