= Maureen Meikle =

Scottish historian (1961–2023)

Maureen M. Meikle at Riddle's Court

Maureen M. Meikle (1961 – 31 December 2023) was a Scottish academic historian.

Her 1988 PhD thesis at the University of Edinburgh was titled 'Lairds and gentlemen: A study of the landed families of the Eastern Anglo-Scottish Borders c.1540-1603'. Maureen Meikle was a Fulbright Visiting professor of British History at Westminster College, Fulton, Missouri, between 1993 and 1995.

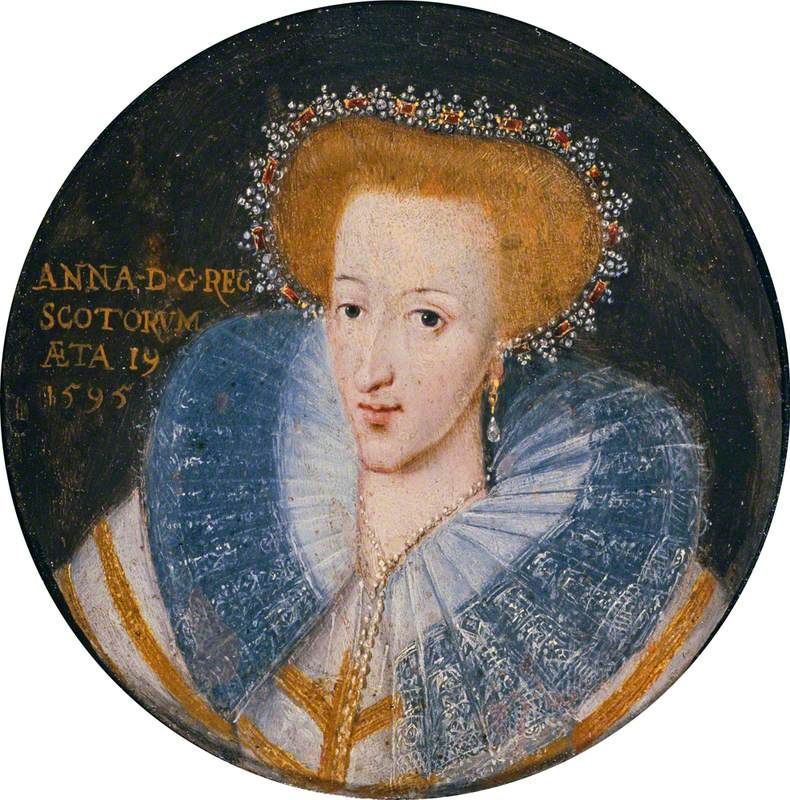
Anna of Denmark, studio of Adrian Vanson

She was Senior Lecturer in History at the University of Sunderland, and appointed Head of Humanities at Leeds Trinity University in 2009. Latterly, writing a new biography of Anne of Denmark, Anna of Denmark 1574-1619: Britain’s First Queen Consort, like many recent historians she preferred "Anna" for the queen's forename.

In 2015, Meikle was a historical consultant to the Border Reiver "Beyond the Border" project at Hexham Old Gaol project based on the stories of 16th-century prisoners chosen by groups from three prisons in the North East, funded by the Heritage Lottery Fund.

== Later career ==
Professor Emerita Maureen Meikle gave a paper at Jesus College, Oxford, on 11 May 2019 at the conference "Crossing the North Sea: Anna of Denmark, Cultural Transfer and Transnational Politics". She gave a public lecture titled "Anna of Denmark as Queen of Scots, 1590–1603", at the Patrick Geddes Centre at Riddle's Court in Edinburgh on 30 October 2019. These events commemorated the 400 year anniversary of the death of Anne of Denmark.

Meikle died on 31 December 2023, at the age of 62.

== Selected publications ==
- Meikle, Maureen M. (2019). "Once a Dane, Always a Dane? Queen Anna of Denmark's Foreign Relations and Intercessions as a Queen Consort of Scotland and England, 1588–1619". The Court Historian. 24 (2): 168–180. doi:10.1080/14629712.2019.1626121.
- The Scottish People, 1490-1625 (Lulu, 2013). ISBN 978-1291518009 (Paperback); ISBN 978-1291985665 (E-book).
- Meikle, Maureen M.; Payne, Helen M. (2013). "From Lutheranism to Catholicism: The Faith of Anna of Denmark (1574–1619)". The Journal of Ecclesiastical History. 64: 45–69. doi:10.1017/S0022046911000868.
- 'Scottish reactions to the marriage of the Lady Elizabeth, "first dochter of Scotland"', Sara Smart & Mara R. Wade, The Palatine Wedding 1613: Protestant Alliance and Court Festival (Wiesbaden: Harrassowitz in Kommission, 2013), pp. 131–143
- 'Anna Of Denmark’s Coronation And Entry Into Edinburgh, 1590: Cultural, Religious And Diplomatic Perspectives', Sixteenth-Century Scotland: Essays in Honour of Michael Lynch (Brill, 2008), pp. 277-294
- A British Frontier? Lairds and Gentlemen in the Eastern Anglo-Scottish Frontier, 1540-1603 (Tuckwell: East Linton, 2004)
- 'A meddlesome princess: Anna of Denmark and Scottish court politics 1589–1603, Julian Goodare & Michael Lynch, The Reign of James VI (Tuckwell: East Linton, 2000), pp. 126–140.
- 'Holde her at the Oeconomicke rule of the house': Anna of Denmark and Scottish Court of Finances, 1589-1630', Elizabeth Ewan and Maureen M. Meikle, Women in Scotland c.1100-c.1750 (Tuckwell: East Linton, 1999).
