= Charles Weatherby =

English cricketer and publisher

Personal information
- Full name: Charles Thomas Weatherby
- Born: 7 May 1860; Kensington, Middlesex, England
- Died: 24 June 1913 (aged 53); Lindfield, Sussex, England
- Batting: Right-handed
- Relatives: Francis Weatherby (brother); John Weatherby (brother); John Atkinson-Clark (nephew)

Domestic team information
- Years: Team
- 1882: Marylebone Cricket Club

Career statistics
Competition	First-class
Matches	1
Runs scored	16
Batting average	8.00
100s/50s	–/–
Top score	15
Catches/stumpings	–/–
- Source: Cricinfo, 17 June 2021

Charles Thomas Weatherby (7 May 1860 – 24 June 1913) was an English first-class cricketer and publisher.

The eldest son of Edward Weatherby, he was born at Kensington in May 1860. He was educated at Winchester College, where he played for the cricket eleven. He was described by Lillywhite's Companion as "a fair bat and field" while at Winchester. From Winchester he went up to New College, Oxford. He played cricket for New College, but did not represent Oxford University Cricket Club in first-class cricket. He did however play one first-class match for the Marylebone Cricket Club against Oxford University in 1882, a year after his graduation from New College. He batted twice in the match, being dismissed for scores of 1 and 15 by Edward Peake and Charles Godfrey respectively. After graduating from Oxford, he worked for the family business, Weatherby & Sons, which was responsible for publishing the Racing Calendar. Weatherby died suddenly in June 1913 at Lindfield, Sussex. His brothers, Francis and John, both played first-class cricket, as did his nephew John Atkinson-Clark.
