= Weatherby (surname) =

Weathersby
- Language: English

Origin
- Meaning: A person from Wetherby
- Region of origin: West Yorkshire

Other names
- Variant forms: Weatherby, Weatherbee, Weatherbie, Wetherby, Wetherbee, Wethersby, Witherby

Weatherby, Weatherbee, Weatherbie, Wethersby, Wethersbee, and Wetherby are related English surnames, originally given to people from Wetherby, West Yorkshire. The place name, in turn, derives from Old English terms derived "from Old Norse veðr 'wether (sheep)' + býr 'farmstead'". People with the surnames include:

== Weatherby ==
- Charles Alfred Weatherby (1875–1949), American botanist
- Delia L. Weatherby (1843–1916) American social reformer, author
- Dennis Weatherby (1959–2007), American inventor, scientist, and university administrator
- Sir Francis Weatherby (1885–1969), English cricketer, soldier and horse racing official
- James Weatherby (fl. 1770s–1790s), founder of Weatherbys Group, a UK conglomerate
- John Weatherby (1870–1948), English cricketer
- Meredith Weatherby (1915–1997), American publisher
- Roy Weatherby (1910–1988), American gunsmith, founder of the Weatherby gun company

== Weathersby ==
- Carl Weathersby (born 1953), American blues musician
- Davis Weathersby, American football coach
- Dennis Weathersby (born 1980), American football player
- Thomas Weathersby Sr. (born 1944), American politician
- Toby Weathersby (born 1996), American football player

== Weatherbee ==
- Artemus E. Weatherbee (1918–1995), American Assistant Secretary of the Treasury
- Rogelio Weatherbee (born 1955), Mexican weightlifter
- Randolph Weatherbee (1907–1976), justice of the Maine Supreme Judicial Court

== Wetherby ==
- Lawrence Wetherby (1908–1994), Governor of Kentucky

== Weathersbee ==
- Louis Weathersbee (fl. 1960s), NASCAR Grand National Series race car owner

== See also ==
- Mr. Weatherbee, fictional character in the Archie Comics universe
- Weatherby (disambiguation)
