= Francis Weatherby =

English cricketer, soldier, and horse racing official

Personal information
- Full name: Francis Weatherby
- Born: 15 August 1885; Oatlands, Surrey, England
- Died: 17 November 1969 (aged 84); Ettington, Warwickshire, England
- Batting: Right-handed
- Relatives: Charles Weatherby (brother); John Weatherby (brother); John Atkinson-Clark (nephew)

Domestic team information
- Years: Team
- 1904: Oxford University
- 1902: Buckinghamshire

Career statistics
Competition	First-class
Matches	4
Runs scored	69
Batting average	11.50
100s/50s	–/–
Top score	24
Catches/stumpings	2/–
- Source: Cricinfo, 27 June 2011

Sir Francis Weatherby MC (15 September 1885 – 17 November 1969) was an English cricketer, later a soldier and horse racing official.

== Cricket ==
Weatherby was a right-handed batsman. He was born in Oatlands, Surrey and educated at Winchester College, where he played for the college cricket team.

Weatherby made a single Minor Counties Championship appearance for Buckinghamshire in 1902 against Berkshire. Weatherby made his first-class debut for Oxford University against the Gentlemen of England in 1904. He made 2 further first-class appearances for the university in 1904, against Somerset and Yorkshire. In his 3 first-class matches for the university, he scored 54 runs at an average of 13.50, with a high score of 24. He made a final first-class appearance for the Gentlemen of England against Oxford University in 1905. In this match, he scored a single run in the Gentlemen first-innings, before being dismissed by Francis Henley. In their second innings, he scored 14 runs before being dismissed by Trevor Branston.

== Later life ==
During World War I Weatherby served with the Queen's Own Oxfordshire Hussars and was awarded the Military Cross in 1918 "for conspicuous gallantry and devotion to duty."

Weatherby was a member of the family that owned and ran Weatherbys, the company that administers British horse racing. Francis Weatherby was Secretary to the Jockey Club from 1930 to 1952 and after retiring was knighted in the 1953 New Year Honours.

== Family ==
Weatherby came from a family with a strong cricketing connections. His brothers Charles and John played first-class cricket, as did his nephew John Atkinson-Clark. Weatherby died in Ettington, Warwickshire on 17 November 1969.
