= William Harbord =

William Harbord may refer to:

- William Harbord (cricketer) (1908–1992), cricketer for Yorkshire, Oxford University and MCC
- William Harbord (politician) (1635–1692), English politician and diplomat
- William Harbord, 2nd Baron Suffield (1766–1821), noble and cricketer for MCC
- Sir William Harbord, 1st Baronet (died 1770), Norfolk country gentleman and Member of Parliament
