= John Weatherby =

English cricketer

Personal information
- Full name: John Harry Weatherby
- Born: 13 February 1870; Oatlands, Surrey, England
- Died: 6 February 1948 (aged 77); Leamington Spa, Warwickshire, England
- Role: Occasional wicket-keeper
- Relatives: Charles Weatherby (brother); Francis Weatherby (brother); John Atkinson-Clark (nephew)

Domestic team information
- Years: Team
- 1896–1898: Buckinghamshire
- 1901/02–1903/04: Europeans (India)

Career statistics
Competition	First-class
Matches	11
Runs scored	430
Batting average	25.29
100s/50s	–/3
Top score	74
Balls bowled	–
Wickets	–
Bowling average	–
5 wickets in innings	–
10 wickets in match	–
Best bowling	–
Catches/stumpings	8/–
- Source: ESPNcricinfo, 27 June 2011

John Harry Weatherby (13 February 1870 – 6 February 1948) was an English cricketer. Weatherby's batting and bowling styles are unknown, but it is known he fielded occasionally as a wicket-keeper. He was born in Oatlands, Surrey and educated at Winchester College, where he played for the college cricket team.

Weatherby made his first-class debut for RS Lucas' XI during the team's tour of the West Indies in early 1895. He made his debut against Barbados, and played seven further first-class matches on tour, the last coming against Jamaica. In his 8 first-class matches on the tour, he scored 248 runs at an average of 22.54, with a single half century score of 56, which he made against Trinidad.

In England, Weatherby made his debut for Buckinghamshire in the 1896 Minor Counties Championship against Oxfordshire. He played Minor counties cricket for Buckinghamshire from 1896 to 1897, making 3 further Minor Counties Championship appearances. Later, when in the British Raj, Weatherby played first-class cricket for the Europeans, twice against the Parsees in 1901 and again against the same opposition in a single match in 1903. Weatherby scored 182 runs for the Europeans at an average of 30.33, with a further two half-centuries. It was for the Europeans that he scored his highest first-class score, making 74 in 1901.

He came from a family with strong cricketing connections. His brothers Charles and Francis played first-class cricket, as did his nephew John Atkinson-Clark. Weatherby died in Leamington Spa, Warwickshire, on 6 February 1948.
