= Lupold von Wedel =

German travel writer

Lupold von Wedel (25 January 1544 – 13 June 1612/1615) was a German travel writer, mercenary leader and landowner.

== Career ==
He was the son of Kurt (Curdt) von Wedel (died 1552) and his second wife Anna von Borcke (died 1573). After the death of his father, he attended school for a short while in Stargard, but soon became a squire to the mercenary leader Vollrad von Mansfeld (1520-1578) and traveled and fought at his side all over Germany. This was to shape the rest of his life.

In the years from 1561 to 1606 he traveled the world as a soldier, later as a mercenary leader, a war reporter and travel writer. In 1566 he took part in the campaign against the Turks in Hungary. He also fought on the side of the Protestants in 1575 and 1591 in the Huguenot Wars in France, the Cologne War 1583-1584 and the Strasbourg Bishops' War 1592-1593. He traveled to the Holy Land, to Egypt (1578-1579), Italy, Spain and Portugal (1580-1581) and from August 1584 to May 1585 to England and Scotland. His notes about his stays in Franconia (1593) and Karlsbad are also historically valuable.

Wedel was only married at the age of 54, on 13 September 1598, to Anna von Eickstedt (1560-1629), the daughter of the Pomerania chancellor Valentin von Eickstedt (1527-1579), lord at Klempenow, and Anna von Jasmund (1539-1607).

== England and Scotland ==
This is a summary of Gottfried von Bülow's 1895 translation of Wedel's journal of his 1584-1585 travels in England and Scotland. Wedel and his companion Ewald von der Goltz sailed from Flushing on 14 August 1584 and up the Thames towards London. He wanted to get an English passport for Scotland from Queen Elizabeth at Oatlands, so he took a small boat up the Thames, visiting Richmond Palace and Hampton Court where he was particularly impressed by the fish ponds. At Oatlands, Wedel's interpreter forwarded his petition for the passport to Francis Walsingham, who came to speak with him, and gave him a passport. This was not routine, and other travellers had been refused passports for Scotland because of political troubles.

Wedel returned to London and watched dog and bear fights in a round theatre on 23 August. The next day, St Bartholmew's fair, he saw the Lord Mayor preside over wrestling. On 25 August he sat in the Coronation Chair at Westminster Abbey then visited Bridewell Palace and the Tower of London, where he was more impressed with the beds and tapestry than any armour. On 26 he went to Whitehall Palace and saw an anamorphic portrait of Edward VI and the banqueting house for embassies hung with tree branches.

On 29 August he set off for Scotland with Goltz, Francis von Trotha, Wulf Sigismund von Honsberck and John Wachendorf, a resident of the German merchant Steelyard who could speak Scots, staying the first night at Ware. Riding north, at Ferrybridge, Trotha's tutor fell off his horse and badly injured his face. They brought a letter from Sir Peter Middleton to his steward who arranged a day's hunting at Stockeld Park near Wetherby and saw five Roman columns near Boroughbridge. At Berwick upon Tweed they showed their passports to the governor Henry Carey, 1st Baron Hunsdon. On 11 September they crossed the border and met their Scottish escort, as arranged by Hunsdon, a mile from Berwick.

In Scotland Wedel saw the usual sights, and went to Perth where James VI was staying at Ruthven Castle, and he saw the king in church on 20 September, dressed in red in the Italian fashion with a diamond cross in his hat, with the young Duke of Lennox standing beside him. The cross had been sent to James VI at Perth from Edinburgh on 31 August, and was recorded as a gold cross with seven diamonds and two rubies.

Wedel noted that the Earl of Arran was keeper of Edinburgh Castle and very powerful, and he met Colonel William Stewart and his wife, Erika, the widow of Willem van Bronckhorst-Batenburg. In Edinburgh he stayed with Janet Fockart, and her son the poet William Fowler rode with Wedel, and he learnt that Fowler was a favourite with the king for teaching him the art of memory. Wedel went to Musselburgh and visited a house which he called "Zidon" (possibly Seton Palace or Pinkie House), and enjoyed the garden and admired the tall hedges, but could not get in. Wedel and his friends rode to London and continued their sight-seeing.

On 18 October 1584 he saw the queen at Hampton Court, wearing black velvet as mourning for the deaths of William the Silent and Francis, Duke of Anjou, embroidered with silver and pearls. On 12 November Elizabeth came to St James Palace, riding in an open gilt carriage, drawn by four horses, under a canopy of red velvet embroidered with gold and pearls. The Earl of Leicester rode beside the carriage and twenty four ladies-in-waiting followed on horseback. On 14 November he went to Tower of London to see the treasury. Wedel saw a tournament on 17 November, Queene's Day. The Queen and her ladies watched from the windows of Whitehall Palace, anyone else could watch from stands below for a shilling. A week later he saw the opening of Parliament. The queen arrived in a sedan-chair like a half-covered or half-roofed bed carried between two horses. He left London on 23 April 1585.

== Publications ==
- Max Bär (ed.): Lupold von Wedel’s Beschreibung seiner Reisen und Kriegserlebnisse, nach der Urhandschrift herausgegeben und bearbeitet, Stettin 1895. Link
- Gottfied von Bülow (transl.): 'Journey Through England and Scotland Made by Lupold von Wedel in the Years 1584 and 1585', in Transactions of the Royal Historical Society, vol. 9 (London, 1895), pp. 223-270.
