= Wetherby (disambiguation) =

Wetherby is a market town and civil parish in the City of Leeds, West Yorkshire, England.

Wetherby may also refer to:

- Wetherby (film), a 1985 British drama film
- Wetherby (surname), a surname
- Wetherby (ward), an electoral ward of Leeds City Council, West Yorkshire

== See also ==
- Weatherby (disambiguation)
- Weatherbee, a surname
