= Jewels of James VI and I =

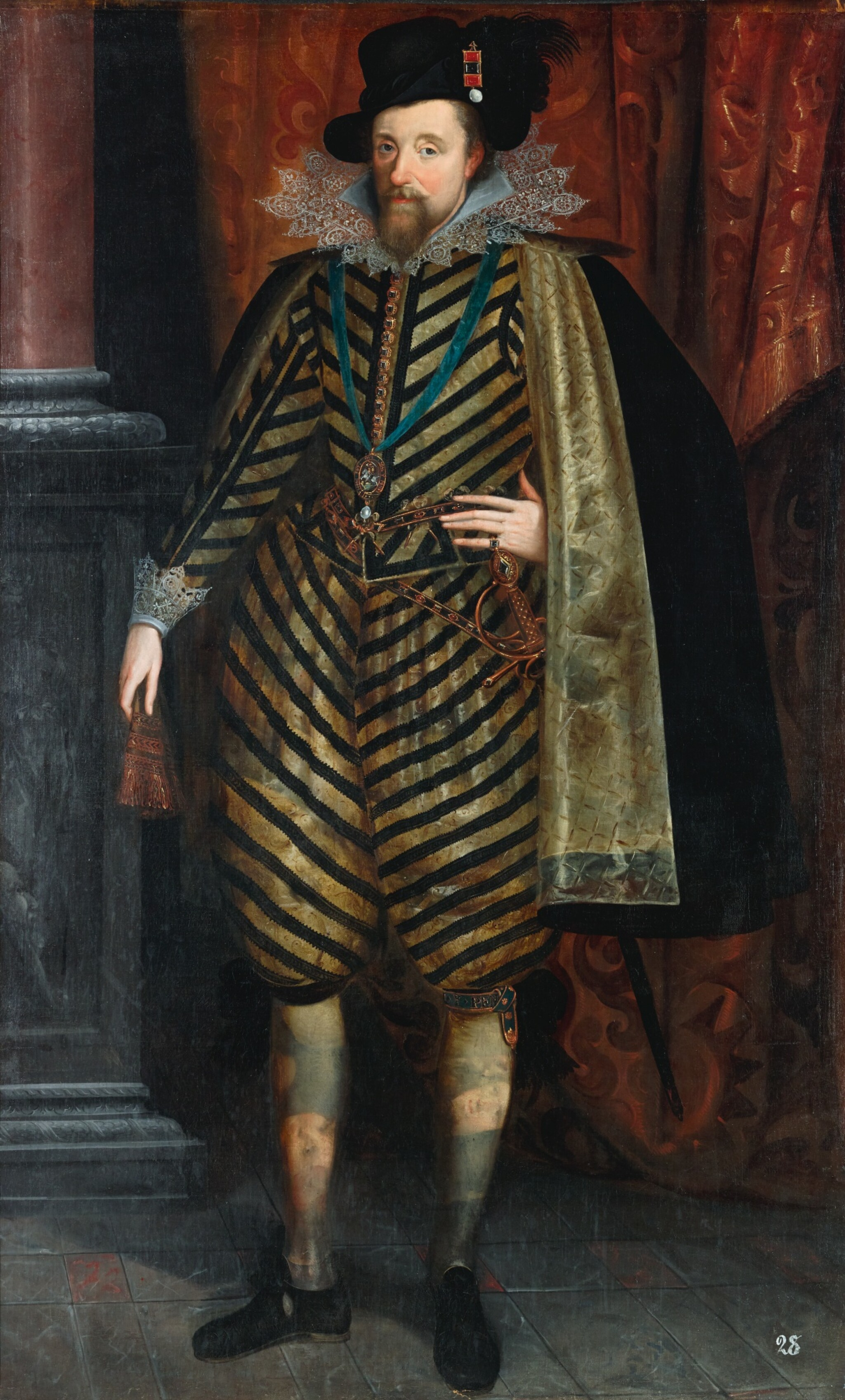
James VI and I wears a pendant hat badge featuring two rubies and a table diamond and diamond and ruby buttons on his doublet.

James VI and I (1566–1625), King of Scotland from 1567, and King of England from 1603, had a large collection of jewels. Many were inherited from his mother Mary, Queen of Scots, or recovered from her supporters after the end of the Marian Civil War in 1573. James bought more jewels from goldsmiths. He wore them to emphasise his majesty, gave them as gifts to his favourites, commissioned their depiction in his portraits, and occasionally pawned them with goldsmith-financiers to fund his rule. At the Union of Crowns in 1603, James obtained the jewels of the English monarchy. James favoured hat jewels set with large precious stones.

== Jewels throughout a reign ==
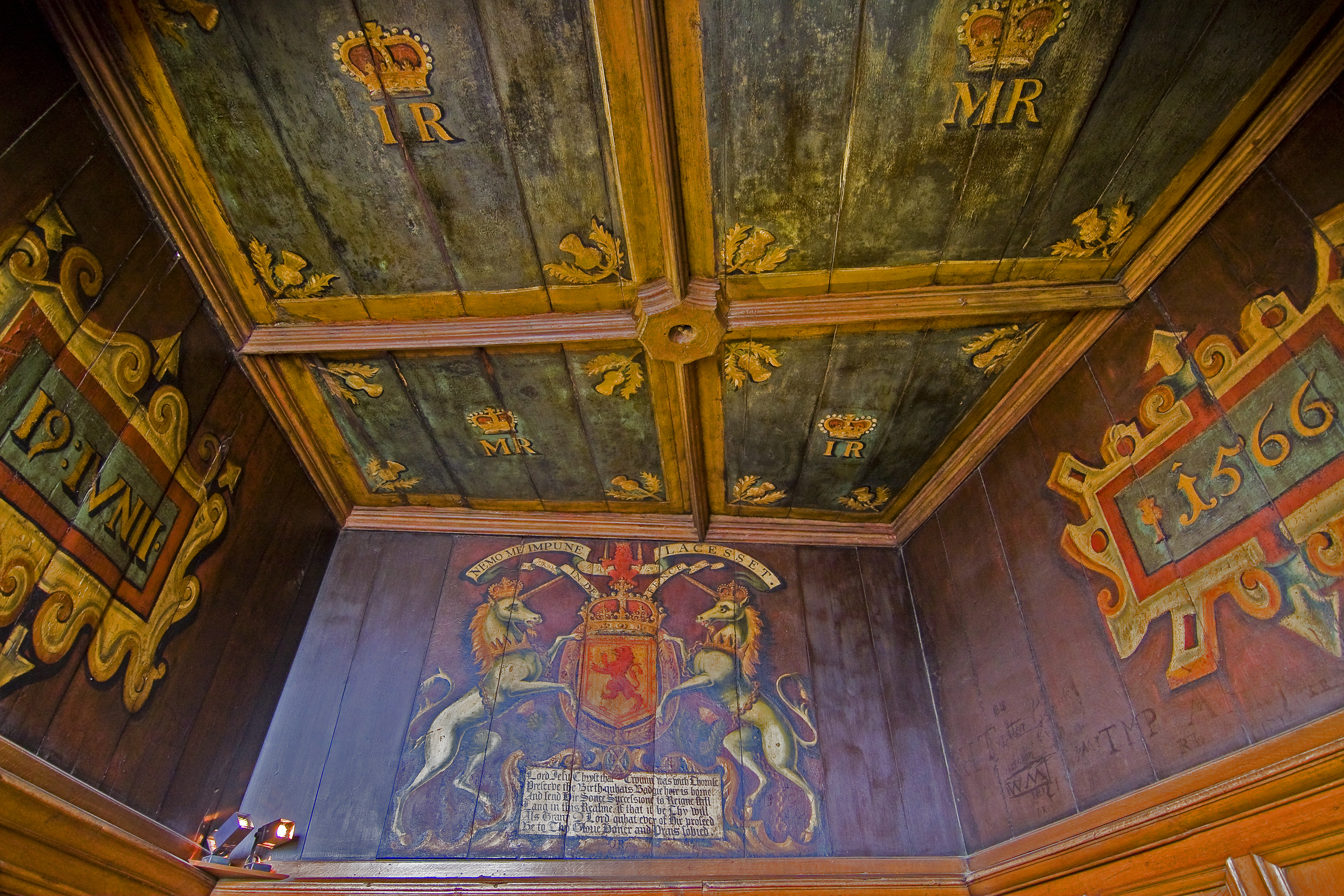
Mary, Queen of Scots, fixed a diamond cross to the swaddling clothes of the infant Prince James in her chamber in Edinburgh Castle.

Anthony Standen, an English servant of James' father Henry Stuart, Lord Darnley, wrote that Mary, Queen of Scots, showed him James in his cradle at Edinburgh Castle. The infant Prince was asleep, a cross of diamonds fixed on his breast.

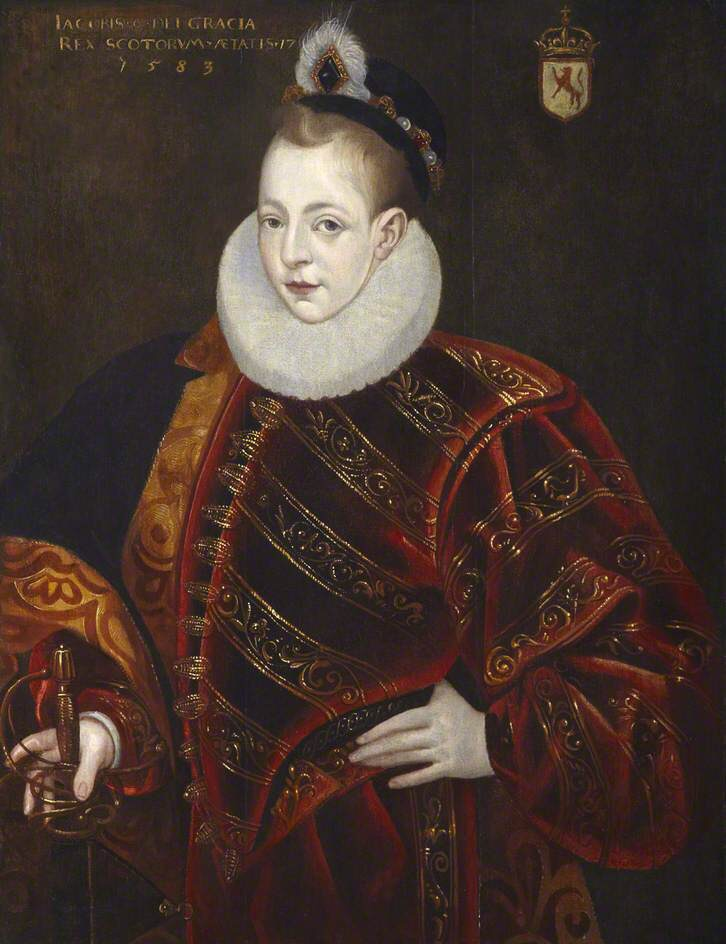
James VI and I in 1583 (Dunfermline Carnegie Library), the Countess of Arran ordered that precious stones worn on Mary's French hood should be sewn on his cloak in May 1585.

=== Childhood at Stirling Castle ===
After Mary was deposed in 1567, James was brought up at Stirling Castle, in a household managed by Annabell Murray, Countess of Mar. In January 1570, Mary, Queen of Scots, who was in captivity in England at Tutbury Castle, sent a present of clothes to James VI. She wanted these to be his first proper clothes, his first "doublet and long hose" provided by his mother. In her letter to the Countess of Mar, Mary said the gift did not include essential buttons, which with the rest of her jewels were kept from her, "whereto there wants such buttons as were worthy to garnish it, thanks to them who withholds from us suchlike and better." Mary's buttons were obtained for James three years later, when William Kirkcaldy of Grange surrendered Edinburgh Castle.

A coffer containing the jewels of Mary, Queen of Scots, was recovered from Edinburgh Castle, and Regent Morton obtained other jewels which had been pawned by William Kirkcaldy of Grange. On 28 July 1573, Morton sent some of these jewels to Annabell Murray to be sewn on the king's clothes, including gold buttons enamelled in white and red, and white and black, and sets of large "horns" or "points" with enamel and engraving. Morton also had 60 new gold and silver buttons made for James VI. Annabell Murray received a variety of jewels over the subsequent years until 1579 when the King was declared an adult and moved to Edinburgh. These included a fossil shark tooth or "serpent's tongue" mounted in gold as an amulet intended to neutralise any poisons in the king's food.

On 16 September 1577, Mungo Brady was appointed as the King's goldsmith, Brady made gold rings for the King to give as New Year's Day gifts, and silver-gilt buckles for the King's boots. Elizabeth I, Queen of England, sent King James a hat badge set with diamonds and rubies, which was described in Scots as "ane litle targett on his Majesties bonatt send to him be the Quene of England sett with litle diamantis and sparkis of rubyis". James VI was declared an adult ruler in October 1579, and rewarded a workmen who brought the coffer of jewels from Edinburgh Castle to Holyrood Palace with three shillings.

James exchanged rings with his mother in January 1581, sending her a letter in French. A postscript refers to his faithful little monkey that stays beside him and would often bring news. This seems to refer to an actual monkey given to James by Mary, though it has also been suggested as a reference to a messenger like George Douglas.

=== Esmé Stewart and a diamond cross ===
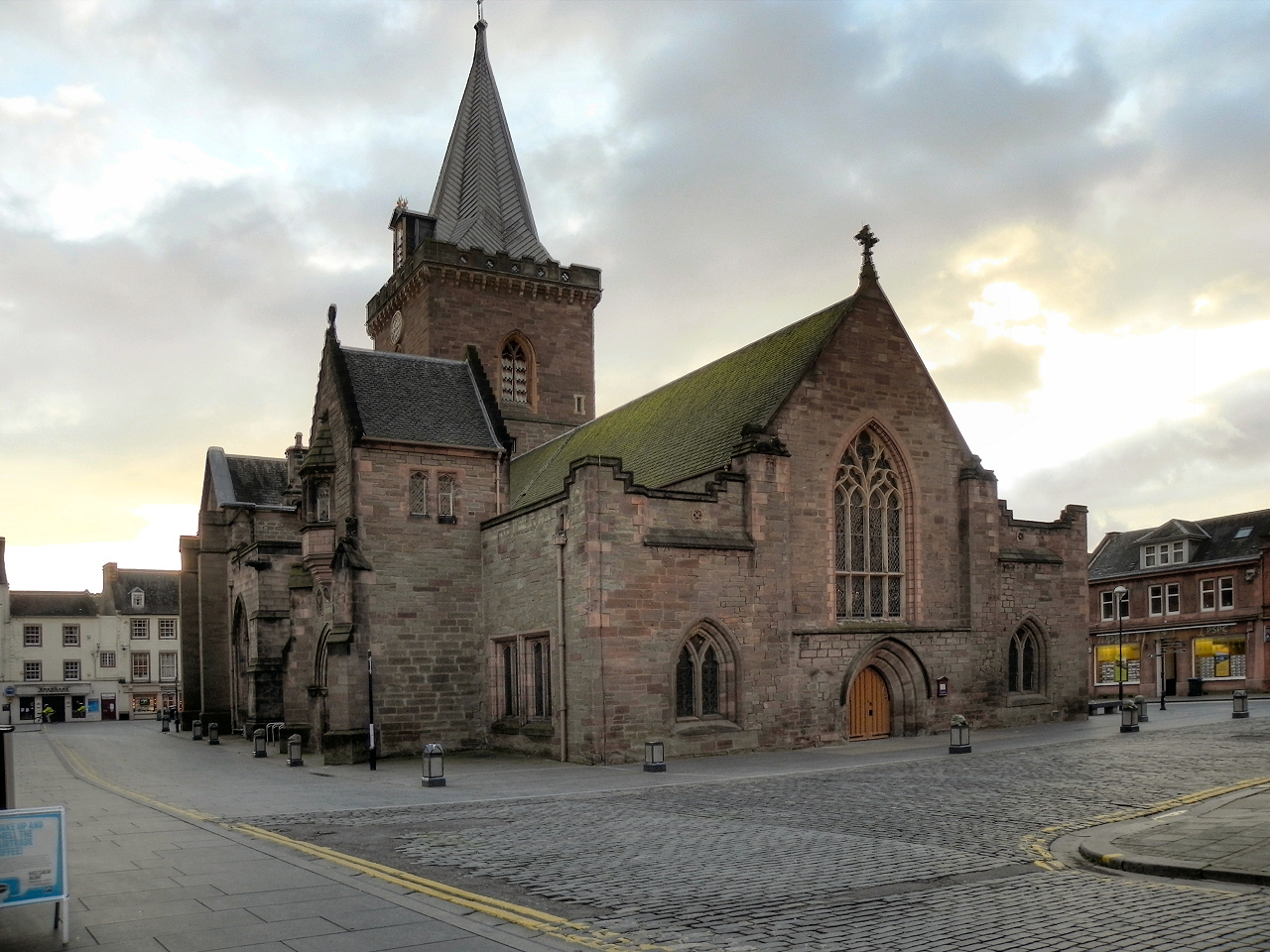
James VI wore a diamond cross at St John's Kirk in Perth.

James gave several of his mother's jewels to his favourite Esmé Stewart in October 1581, including the "Great H of Scotland" and a gold cross set with seven diamonds and two rubies. He was a second cousin to James and Master of the Wardrobe. Esmé returned the jewels before he left Scotland for ever.

In the weeks before the end of the Gowrie Regime, James sent James Murray secretly to France with a gold button from his doublet for Lennox, one that he had worn next to his heart.

In August 1584, William Davison heard that Elizabeth Stewart, Countess of Arran had new keys made for the coffers in Edinburgh Castle containing the jewels and clothes of Mary, Queen of Scots. She was said to have tried on many of the queen's garments to see if they fitted her, and chosen what she liked. She passed sets of pearl, ruby, and diamond buttons or settings from the garnishings for a French hood to the Master of Gray, who was master of the king's wardrobe. The precious stones were sewn on the king's cloak.

In September 1584, a German travel writer Lupold von Wedel saw James, who was staying at Ruthven Castle, wearing the cross on his hat ribbon in St John's Kirk in Perth. James was accompanied by Esmé Stewart's son Ludovic Stewart, 2nd Duke of Lennox. In October, the king's valet John Gibb returned the cross to the Master of Gray, the newly appointed Master of the Royal Wardrobe. It may have been the same diamond and ruby cross that his grandmother, Mary of Guise, had pawned to John Home of Blackadder for £1000 when she was Regent of Scotland, and Mary, Queen of Scots, had redeemed. Possibly the same gold cross, with seven diamonds and two rubies, was pawned by Anne of Denmark to George Heriot in May 1609.

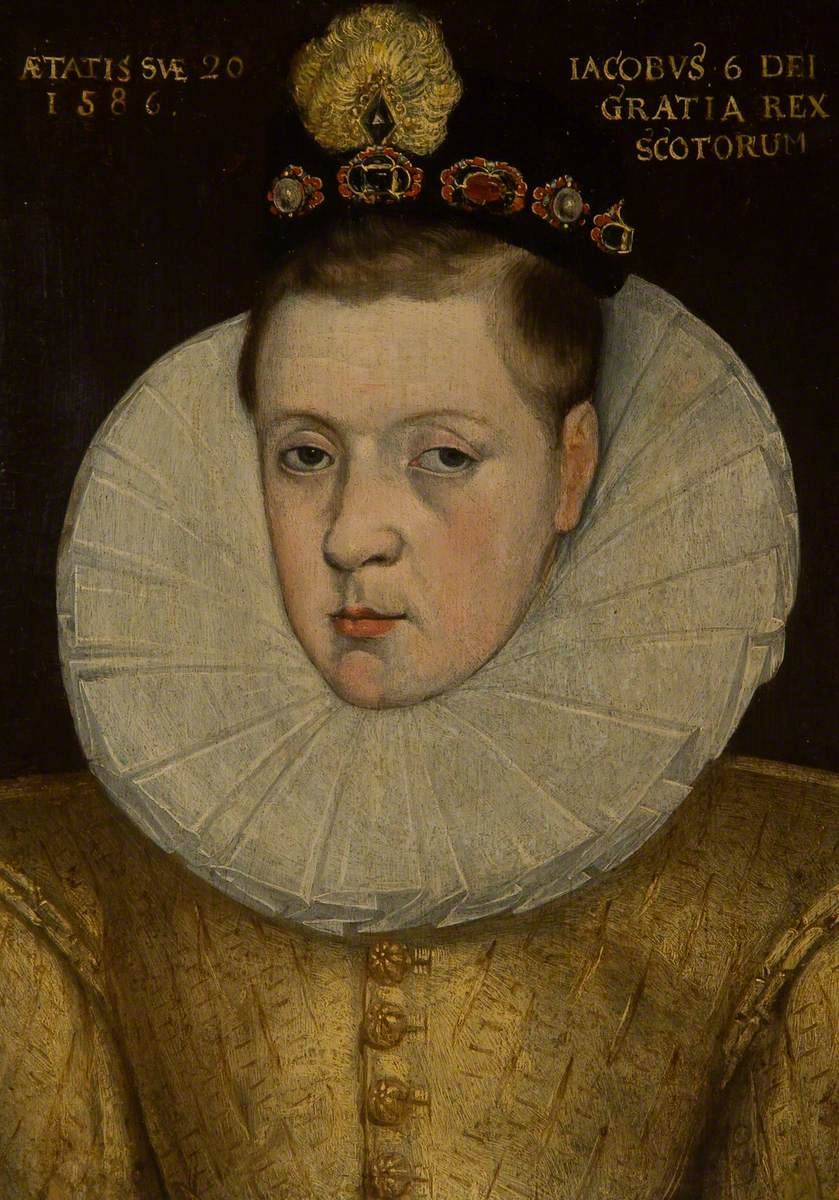
James VI and I aged 20 in 1586, NTS, Falkland Palace.

=== Jewels of Arbella Stuart ===
The King's cousin, Arbella Stuart, was bequeathed jewels by her grandmother Margaret Douglas, Countess of Lennox in 1577. Thomas Fowler, the executor of the Countess of Lennox, brought some of these jewels to Scotland. When Fowler died in 1590, the jewels were obtained by Francis Stewart, 5th Earl of Bothwell, who seems to have passed them on to James.

== Adrian Vanson and Thomas Foulis ==
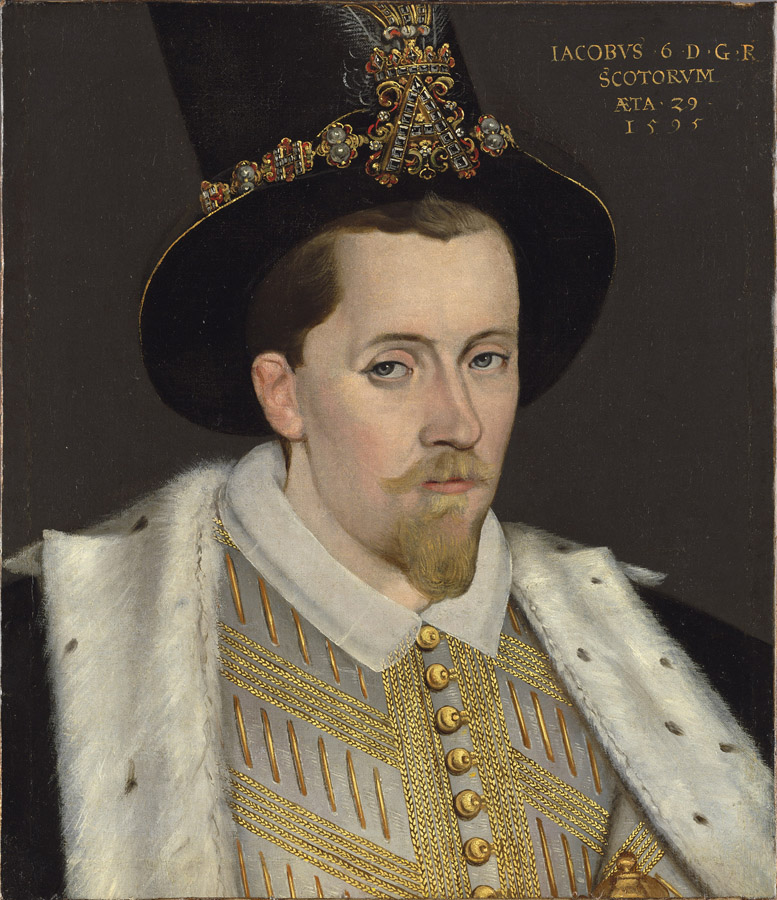
James VI and I by Adrian Vanson (1595) wearing the "A" hat badge and a diamond "H" in his hat band.

King James employed two Flemish painters, Arnold Bronckorst and Adrian Vanson to paint his portraits. The French ambassador in London, Michel de Castelnau sent Mary, Queen of Scots, a portrait of James in a new style in October 1582.

Elizabeth sent James her portrait and a jewel, perhaps a portrait miniature, as a New Year's Day gift for January 1583. According to Robert Bowes, James showed her "portraiture" to noblemen and others of his chamber.

In 1586, a French diplomat Charles de Prunelé, Baron d'Esneval wrote to Catherine de' Medici about plans for James to marry. He heard that a new portrait was being made by the best painter in Edinburgh ("n'est retrouvir que luy en tout Lyslebourg"), and hoped to obtain a copy for Mary, Queen of Scots. The painter meant was probably Adrian Vanson. The National Trust for Scotland displays a portrait from this period at Falkland Palace, it shows James with a hat band of diamonds, pearls, and rubies in gold collets, with a large lozenge diamond with plumes of feathers as a hat badge.

=== Catherine of Bourbon ===
A diplomat from Navarre Guillaume de Salluste Du Bartas was given a gold tablet with the king's portrait in August 1582. William Melville returned with him to collect a portrait of Catherine of Bourbon. James decided not to marry her.

=== A jewelled clock salt ===
In September 1583, James gave George Carey, an English ambassador, a salt and clock of gold set with diamonds and rubies. Carey bequeathed this item, or £100 as a cash equivalent, to his daughter Elizabeth Berkeley by his 1599 will. Thomas Randolph had previously presented a clock described as a "horologe or motion" to James as a gift from Elizabeth I.

=== John Maitland and Jean Fleming ===
George Keith, 5th Earl Marischal bought a jewel at Elsinore to give to Anne of Denmark at her proxy wedding to James VI. When James VI went to Norway and Denmark in 1589 to meet his bride Anne of Denmark, he made arrangements for gifts of jewellery for the Danish royal family. The Chancellor of Scotland, John Maitland of Thirlestane received from the Master of the Wardrobe William Keith of Delny four great table diamonds set in gold and two great table cut rubies to be set in rings for Sophie of Mecklenburg-Güstrow and Christian IV of Denmark and "other princes our allies". The rings were probably made in Edinburgh by Thomas Foulis.

Maitland was the administrator of funds for the royal wedding. Maitland's wife Jean Fleming, sometimes known as the "Lady Chancellor" and reputed to be "a wise woman and half chancellor", kept an account of royal money with the goldsmith Thomas Foulis. The account is held by the National Library of Scotland. She herself was given a ring set with an amethyst, and her account mentions rings given to the French diplomats Jean Hotman and "Monsieur Leill" (Jérôme Groslot).

=== Foulis at the Shore of Leith ===
James VI had sent Foulis and Robert Jousie to London in July 1589 to buy clothes and ornaments in preparation for his marriage. In pledge of payment for these purchases and for jewels and silver plate made in Foulis's workshop, James gave him two cut rubies and three cabochon rubies set in gold "chatons" or buttons, enamelled with red, white and black. Foulis returned these royal jewels to the depute-treasurer Robert Melville in October 1589, when James VI sailed to Norway. At the Shore of Leith, Foulis returned a large table cut diamond which he had held in pledge from King James since January 1586 for jewellery supplied to the king for New Year's Day gifts.

=== Initial "A" ===
David Gilbert, a nephew of the wealthy Edinburgh goldsmith Michael Gilbert, was commissioned by William Fairlie to remodel a royal jewel presented to Anne of Denmark during her Entry to Edinburgh in 1590. Its velvet presentation case featured her initial "A", and this "fair jewel" was "called the A". Portraits by Vanson and his workshop include such jewels as an "A" for Anne of Denmark and an "H" for Prince Henry" set in diamonds on the King's hat badge and band, so establishing his family as a dynasty.

=== Jewels for James and Anne ===
King James was highly interested in clothes and his appearance, as shown by his wardrobe account held by the National Records of Scotland, although in 1584 a French diplomat Albert Fontenay wrote that he despised daintiness in dress at court, especially wearing earrings. In his Basilikon Doron, James counselled a casual approach as "occasion serveth". In reality, exchequer officials were perplexed by the costs of his and Anna's clothes, in 1591 advising savings so "that this matter be reformit, according to the lovable examples of your guidsire & hir moder". James's grandfather, James V was held to have been a model of financial responsibility, cited for his "lovable order" in household matters in May 1580, while Anna's mother Sophie of Mecklenburg-Güstrow was supposed to be one of the richest women in Europe, and at her death reputed the "richest Queen of Christendom".

Wardrobe accounts for clothing during the 1590s were kept by a textile merchant Robert Jousie throughout most of the 1590s. He worked with the goldsmith Thomas Foulis and their accounts show that most of expense was met from the subsidy sent to James by Queen Elizabeth.

When Anne of Denmark was pregnant in December 1593, it was said that James VI gave Anne of Denmark the "greatest part of his jewels", When Prince Henry was born at Stirling Castle on 19 February 1594, Foulis provided a great opal ring for James to send to Anne of Denmark as a "token", and he set two large rubies and 24 diamonds in a gold "garnishing" for a gift to her on 8 April 1594.

At the time of the baptism of Prince Henry, James VI pawned jewels for £2000 sterling to fight the rebel northern Catholic earls. On 3 October 1594, while his lieutenant Archibald Campbell, 7th Earl of Argyll fought the battle of Glenlivet, James ordered his goldsmith Thomas Foulis to give Adrian Vanson a gold "medal" with his portrait and the portrait of his wife Anne of Denmark which Vanson had probably designed. James signed a precept for Foulis, which survives today in the National Records of Scotland:

Thomas Fowlis, our goldsmyth, It is our will and we command yow, That upon sicht heirof ye anser our painter Adriane of our pictour weyand twentie crownis gold

Foulis supplied jewels to James VI and Anne of Denmark, while his business partner Robert Jousie supplied clothes and fabrics, paid for in part by a subsidy or annuity provided by Queen Elizabeth, and the rent or "tack" which Foulis owed for running the Scottish gold mines. James VI gave Esmé Stewart's daughter Marie Stewart, Countess of Mar, a ring provided by Foulis in May 1595, set with 11 diamonds and worth £300 Scots. In January 1597, Foulis was paid for a diamond and ruby ring, a ring with a great table cut diamond, a ring set with seven diamonds, a ring with eleven diamonds, a tablet or locket with an emerald and ten diamonds, and a "carcan" necklace with diamonds rubies and pearls. The total value was 790 crowns or £2,765 Scots. James VI had given some of these rings and jewels as New Year's Day gifts to his courtiers. Thomas Foulis sent silverwork including a candlestick and salt cellar to furnish the lodging of Prince Henry at Stirling Castle. The Prince was in the care of John Erskine, Earl of Mar and his mother, Annabell Murray.

Foulis had taken the "Great H" as security for a loan to James in 1594, but in January 1598 his financial empire collapsed and the jewel was returned to James and Anne. Foulis made a partial recovery and had a "tack" of the royal mint with Robert Jousie.

=== Jewels pledged for loans in London ===
Thomas Foulis took some royal jewels to pawn with goldsmiths in London to ease the King's finances, but details of these transactions are lacking. The diplomat James Hudson wrote in May 1598 that Foulis had pawned a gold lion set with a ruby worth £400 with the London goldsmith Robert Brook of Lombard Street. Hudson suggested this jewel belonged to James VI. Robert Jousie was unable to pay Brook's interest or other sums due to be paid by Hudson, and Hudson considered having Jousie arrested for debt in London.

In July 1598, James VI ordered his treasurer to pay 3,000 merks to redeem two of Anne of Denmark's pawned jewels. From time to time James would leave jewels with John Erskine, Earl of Mar, the husband of Marie Stewart, for safety and as pledges for loans. Some jewels were pledged for a loan in London. The diplomat David Foulis wrote to Mar from London in December 1601 that the jewels were "delivered in their full integrity". On 28 December, Mar returned a cross set with seven diamonds and two rubies, a hat string with 89 diamonds, and the "feather" jewel to wear in a hat made in the shape of a capital letter "A" (for Anne of Denmark) made with 110 diamonds, with other pieces. In Scots, the feather was described as "ane fedder for ane hatt maid in the forme of an A, contening ane hundreth and ten diamondis, small and grit".

James continued to pay for jewels from the annuity or subsidy provided by Elizabeth I, allocating £400 to the goldsmith and financier George Heriot in February 1600 or 1601. Heriot provided James with a jewel costing £1,333 Scots to be a New Year's Day gift to Anne of Denmark, and a great gold chain with the king's portrait, a miniature or medal presumably designed by Adrian Vanson. This was to be sent as a diplomatic gift to Ulrich, Duke of Mecklenburg, Anne's grandfather. Heriot was paid £611-13s-8d Scots for the chain.

=== Foreign lapidaries in Edinburgh and Leith ===
Two lapidaries, who worked cutting and engraving precious stones and agate in Edinburgh are associated with James VI and George Heriot around 1601. Cornelius Delgrain or Dregghe from Brabant had been working in London where he engraved a sapphire portrait cameo (depicting Elizabeth I) supplied to Anne of Denmark by Thomas Foulis. There are records of similar sapphire portraits. In 1594, Lord Howard gave Elizabeth a headdress including "her Maiesties pycture Cutt uppon A Safyor in the Middest". A sapphire portrait of Elizabeth I with a Scottish provenance survives, albeit in a later setting.

In Edinburgh, "Cornelius Draggie, Dutchman" tried unsuccessfully to exploit a commercial advantage offered to Flemish weavers and obtained a licence from King James. Local craftsman deprecated his qualifications as a weaver. For a time, his wife managed a weaver's shop, although Cornelius was not a weaver but a practitioner of the "airt of lapidarie". George Heriot and another goldsmith Daniel Craufurd were witnesses at the baptism of Daniel, the son of "Mr Cornelius Dalgraine lapitidar in the Cannogait" on 25 January 1601. A "Cornelis Dregge" from Antwerp was working as a stone cutter for the London goldsmith William Layton from 1567, and it is unclear if this was the same artisan.

Palamedes Stevens (Palamedes Willemsz. Stevens), originally from Delft, married Maria Van Arten or Van Narsone in Leith on 6 January 1601. She was a member of an immigrant merchant community including Gilliame Van Narsone who manufactured laundry starch, known as "amedone or stiffing" in Leith. Their children included the painters Anthonie Palamedesz. and Palamedes Palamedesz. (I) both baptised in Leith. The register of baptisms notes that he used "Willemz." as an alias, "Wm.Soun". The register does not record Stevens' profession, but Arnold Houbraken and later biographers of his sons state that he was a lapidary working for James VI turning cups from agate and other hard stones. Agates were engraved to make portrait jewels, and contemporary Scottish jewellery featured carved agates. Annabell Murray, Countess of Mar owned a locket with "the piktur of an aggett anammallit" in 1602.

Only one early cameo of James from this period survives, an onyx cameo of James VI wearing a tall hat documented in the Royal Collection since 1660, which seems to follow the portrait type made Adrian Vanson in 1595.

=== An exchange of rings ===
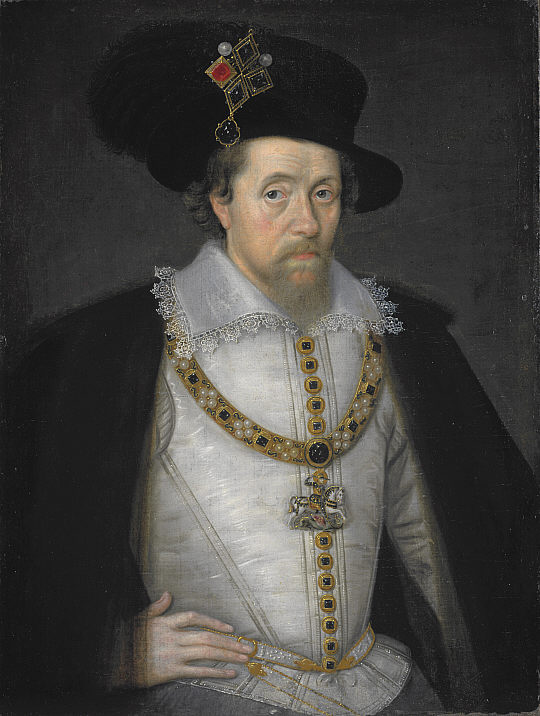
James VI and I wearing the Mirror of Great Britain, by John de Critz, National Galleries of Scotland.

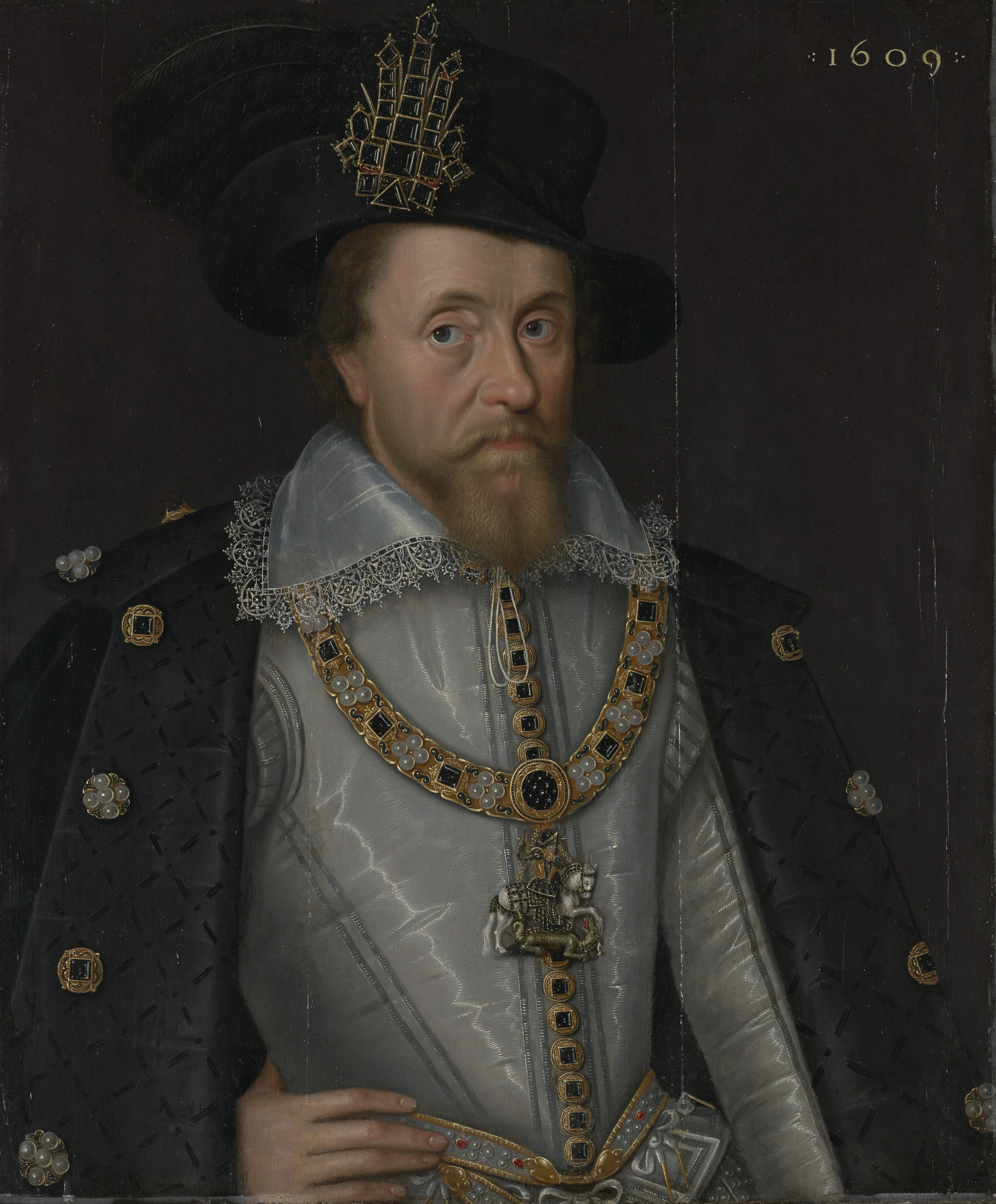
James VI and I wearing a diamond feather hat badge, GAC.

In January 1581, James exchanged rings with his mother. In May 1583, James had sent a diamond ring to Elizabeth I, and she wrote that she would "wear it as an earnest of sincere faith valued more than any Indian gold, ... The diamond is more likely to become malleable than my thoughts turn from respect for your honour and safety".

James bought diamond rings for the use of his diplomats, including one for David Foulis in July 1595. The ring was "to be employed as we have given direction", given as a gift in London. James sent a ruby as a token to Henry Howard, 1st Earl of Northampton, a prospective courtier involved in his "secret correspondence". The Earl wore it set in a jewel with two other stones.

Following the death of Elizabeth I in March 1603, Robert Carey rode to Edinburgh with the news, carrying a sapphire ring. Rings were exchanged as gifts and tokens of esteem and affection, and James had previously sent the ring to Robert's older sister Philadelphia Scrope with his diplomat James Fullerton.

=== Union of the Crowns ===
At this Union of the Crowns, James travelled to London without his family. As soon as he reached Berwick-upon-Tweed, on 6 April 1603, he ordered the Privy Council of England to select jewels from the Tower of London to send to his wife Anne of Denmark, when she crossed the border at Berwick. In a second letter, James requested that the jewels were to be selected by the "ladies attendant" of the late queen, and "meet for the ordinary apparelling and ornament of her". A hairdresser or "tire-woman", Blanche Swansted, who had worked for Elizabeth I, was also sent north to meet her. Anne would thereby come to represent England's queen.

The Venetian diplomat in London Giovanni Carlo Scaramelli first saw James in May 1603. The king wore a suit of silver grey satin and a black cloak, with a chain of diamonds around his neck, and a great diamond in his hat, appearing much as in his portrait by John de Critz. Scaramelli said the effect was not unlike the more modest of his courtiers, an impression which James cultivated, but for the jewels. The large diamond was said to have been from the Portuguese crown jewels, pledged by Don António of Portugal in 1581 for 80,000 crowns. The Sancy diamond, discussed below, was said to have similar provenance.

William Herrick and John Spilman made and refurbished jewels for James and Anne of Denmark in 1603 and 1604. Their bill survives in the collections of the University of Edinburgh. They made a "J" or "I" shaped hat badge which included two balas rubies and a great and a small diamond, and a lozenge diamond taken from a jewel in Anne of Denmark's collection. Herrick and Spilman provided imitation stones set in gold and silver-gilt collets to embroider a cloth-of-estate for the coronation on 25 July 1603 in Westminster Abbey.

Spilman and Herrick were involved in the valuation and disposal of the late Queen Elizabeth's jewels. One piece was sent to the goldsmith and financier Peter Vanlore in exchange for a new jewel including a large rectangular ruby and two lozenge diamonds. Spilman and Herrick also valued a collection of jewels that had been kept by Mary Radcliffe for the Queen's immediate use.

Jewels were prominently featured in the January masque entertainments at court, starting with the 1604 The Masque of Indian and China Knights at Hampton Court. In the performance, William Herbert, 3rd Earl of Pembroke, gave an expensive jewel to the king, but in reality James had the jewel on approval from the financier Peter Vanlore. The masque was produced by Esmé Stewart's son, Ludovic Stewart, 2nd Duke of Lennox. The jewel, which impressed the eye of the French ambassador Christophe de Harlay, Count of Beaumont, was perhaps a great diamond with a pendant pearl delivered by Peter Vanlore with a ruby ring to the king on 1 January, which cost £760.

=== Mirror of Great Britain ===
Soon after, the Mirror of Great Britain was created, using stones taken from the pendant known as the "Great H" or "Great Harry of Scotland", which had a been a wedding present to Mary, Queen of Scots, in 1558, with the Sancy diamond, and other elements presumably from the legacy of the jewels of Elizabeth I. The Mirror represented the kingdoms of England and Scotland, and the traditional claim to the French throne.

The distinctive many facetted 53 carat Sancy diamond was suspended below the four main stones of the Mirror. James had bought Sancy diamond in London from the French ambassador in London, Christophe de Harlay, Count of Beaumont, and his cousin, Robert de Harlay, Baron de Monglat, who was a brother of the owner Nicolas de Harlay, seigneur de Sancy. They showed the diamond to Robert Cecil, and King James bought it for 60,000 French crowns.

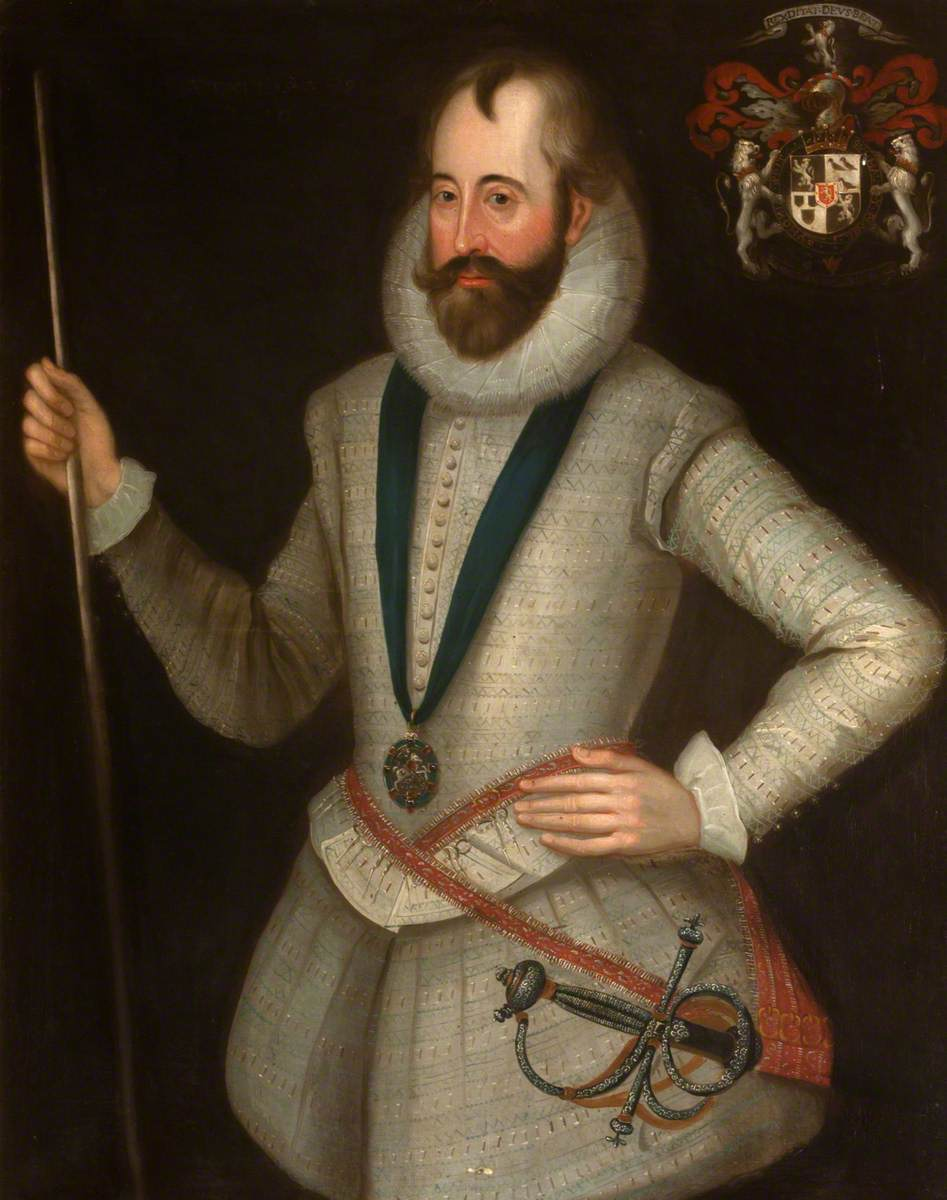
George Home, 1st Earl of Dunbar, was in charge of the royal wardrobe, the diamond feather, and key Scottish jewels, (Paxton House).

John de Critz painted James' portrait with the Mirror of Great Britain, and the feather hat jewel. Several contemporary versions, workshop copies, and copies of these portraits were made. A 1606 schedule of royal jewels mentions the Mirror of Great Britain, the "J", and the feather with its "fayre table diamond in the middest and five and twentie diamonds". One version of the portrait with the feather is held at Dulwich Picture Gallery, another is now displayed at Edinburgh Castle. In the 1630s, the painter Gonzales Coques made miniature versions of the de Critz portraits, some showing James wearing the Mirror of Great Britain.

The making of jewelled aigrettes and "diamond feathers" is associated with the goldsmith Arnold Lulls, whose manuscript book of designs is kept at the Victoria and Albert Museum in London. James gave Anne of Denmark the ruby from the Mirror of Great Britain as a New Year's Day gift in January 1608, set in an aigrette with twenty eight small diamonds. In February 1610, the Venetian diplomats Francesco Contarini and Marc' Antonio Correr noted King James wearing on his hat a jewel "made of five diamonds of extraordinary size" at dinner in February 1610, perhaps the Mirror of Great Britain in an alternative configuration or another jewel. Daniël Mijtens's 1621 portrait of King James displayed at the National Portrait Gallery, London, shows such a jewel as the Mirror of Great Britain on the king's hat resting on a table beside him.

=== Annexed to the Kingdom of this Realm ===
On 27 March 1606, King James declared that a group of "royal and princely ornaments and jewels" were "individually and inseparably for ever hererafter annexed to the Kingdom of this Realm". His mother had included a similar provision in the schedule of Scottish jewels in her 1566 will. The annexed jewels were listed in a schedule and included the Three Brothers, which James "did use to wear upon his hat", the imperial crown of England, the jewel-studded circlet made for Anne of Denmark's English coronation, a collar with the initials "P&M" which had belonged to Mary I of England, a long diamond found at Hampton Court, the "J" hat badge, the diamond set feather, and the newly made Mirror of Great Britain. The schedule was prepared by Vincent Skinner for the Earl of Dorset as Lord Treasurer and was a step towards creating a group of inalienable crown jewels.

=== George Home and the Scottish jewels in the Tower of London ===
George Home, 1st Earl of Dunbar was keeper of the royal wardrobe, and signed Spilman and Herrick's bill in June 1604. An inventory of royal jewels made by the auditor Francis Gofton mentions that he had been the keeper of James' diamond feather jewel.

In July 1606, the office of keeper of the wardrobe in Scotland was given to Sir James Hay, a gentleman of the king's bedchamber. The Earl of Dunbar was receipted for jewels from the Scottish collection held in the Tower of London and elsewhere, including; the ruby and chain from now the (dismantled) pendant called the "Great Harry of Scotland", a hat badge with the crowned monogram "J.A.R" in diamonds with three pendant pearls, a gold ring with five diamonds and clasped hands called the "espousal ring of Denmark", a band for hat or cap with 23 links including twelve pieces with two pearls and six pieces with letters made of diamonds, and a cross with five diamonds. These were pieces which had been brought from Scotland with James for their value and significance, "the jewels of most importance and value that were brought forth of that our kingdom with us".

=== The Lyte jewel ===
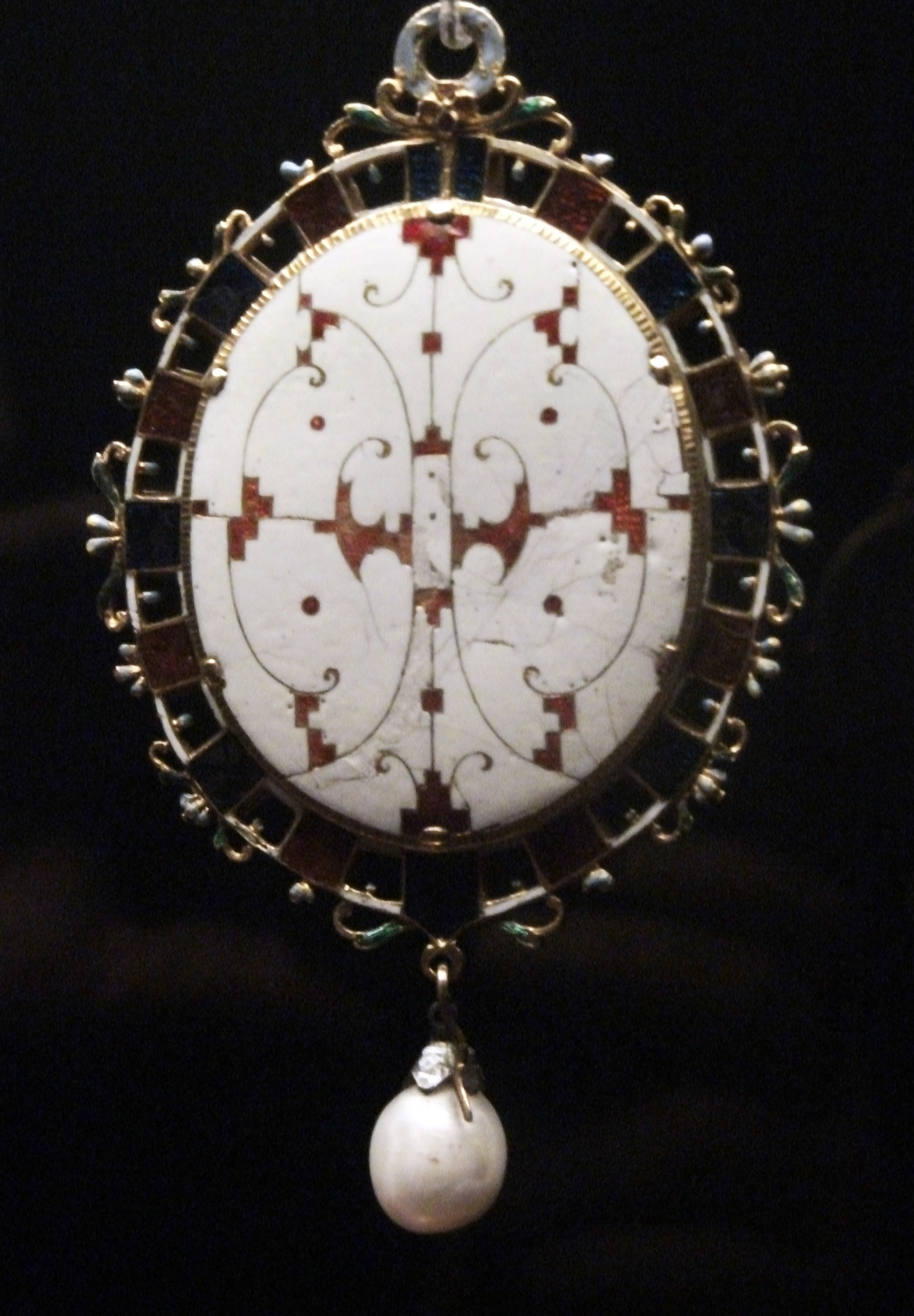
The Lyte jewel, Waddesdon Bequest

In 1610, James gave a locket, now known as the Lyte jewel, to Thomas Lyte who drew up a flattering illustrated royal pedigree. The jewel has a miniature portrait of James by Nicholas Hilliard encircled with diamonds. A gold openwork cover set with diamonds includes the royal cipher "IR". The back is predominantly white enamel with a red motif, and the reverse of the settings of the diamonds show blue and red.

=== Gold medallions ===
James also had gold medals with his portrait made, to serve as diplomatic gifts. A 1616 warrant for payment to the goldsmith John Williams includes "33 medalls of gold, with his Majestie's picture, weying 58 ounces 4 dwt (pennyweight) and 11 graines, at 3l. 8s (£3. 8 shillings) the ounce, given to sundry gent[lemen] and others, attending ambassadors".

=== Ruby buttons and Elizabeth of Bohemia ===
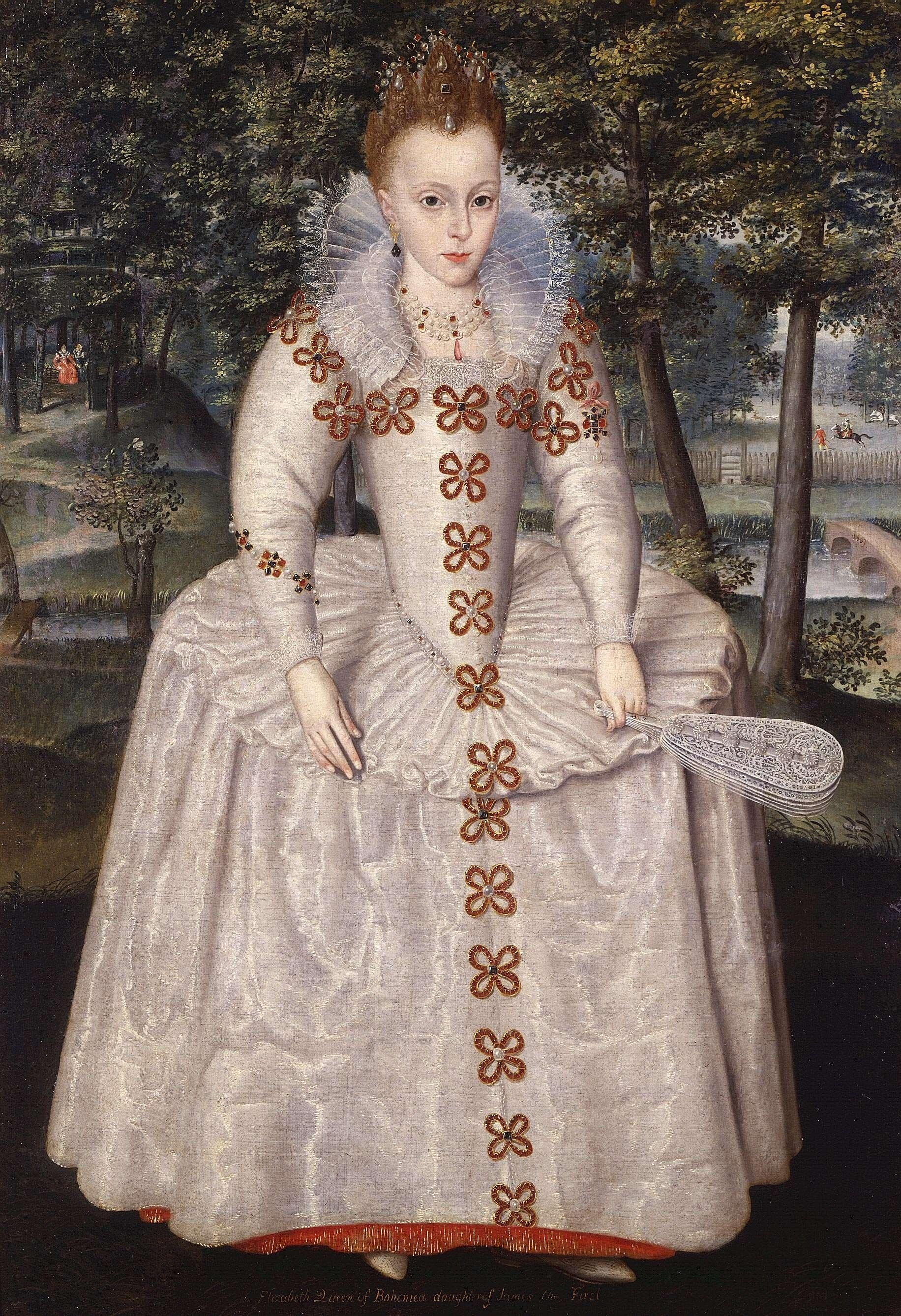
In 1615, James was concerned that his daughter Elizabeth Stuart, Queen of Bohemia had given away ruby buttons and pawned a royal jewel, (Royal Museums Greenwich).

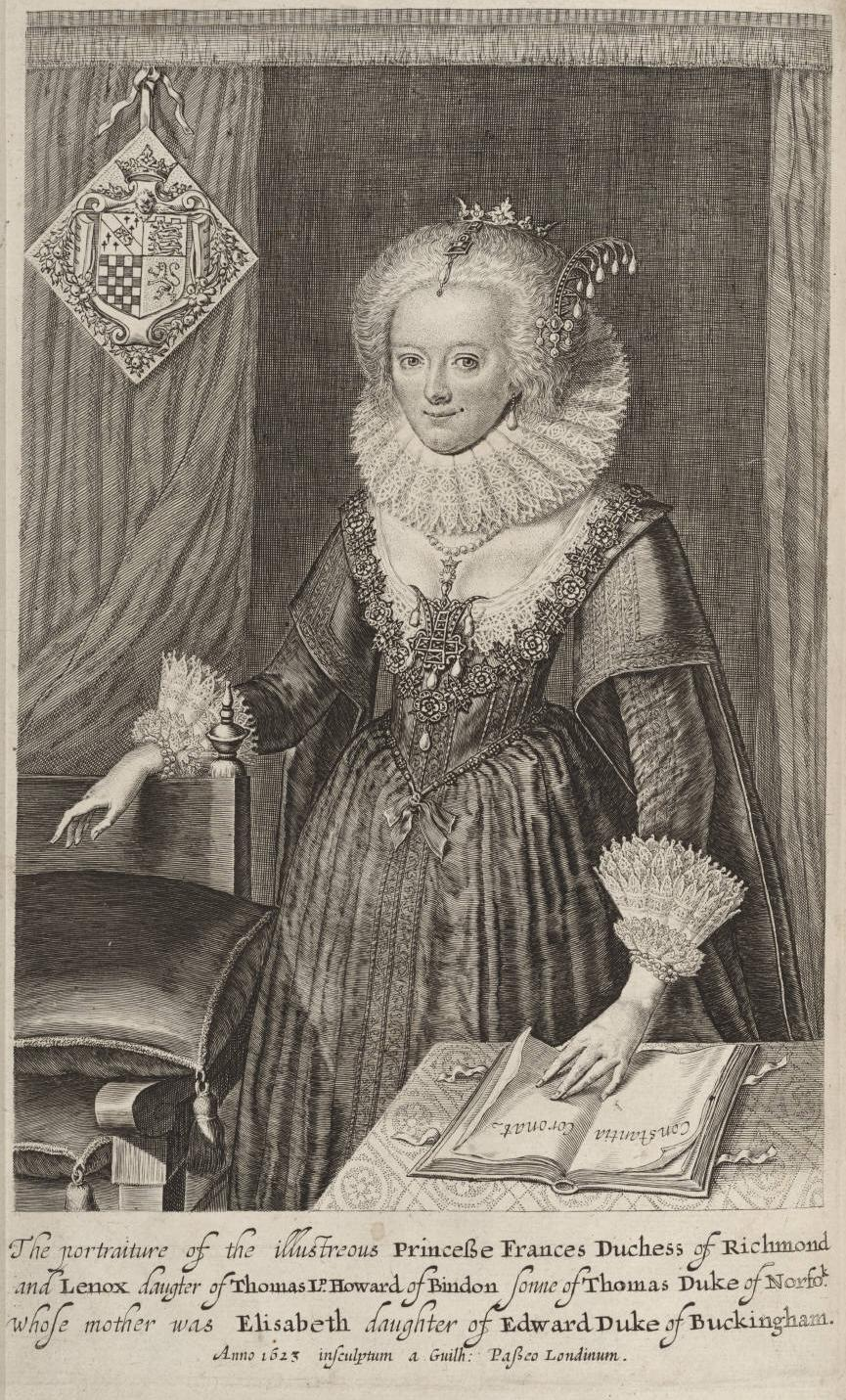
Frances Stewart, Duchess of Lennox wearing jewels gifted to her by King James

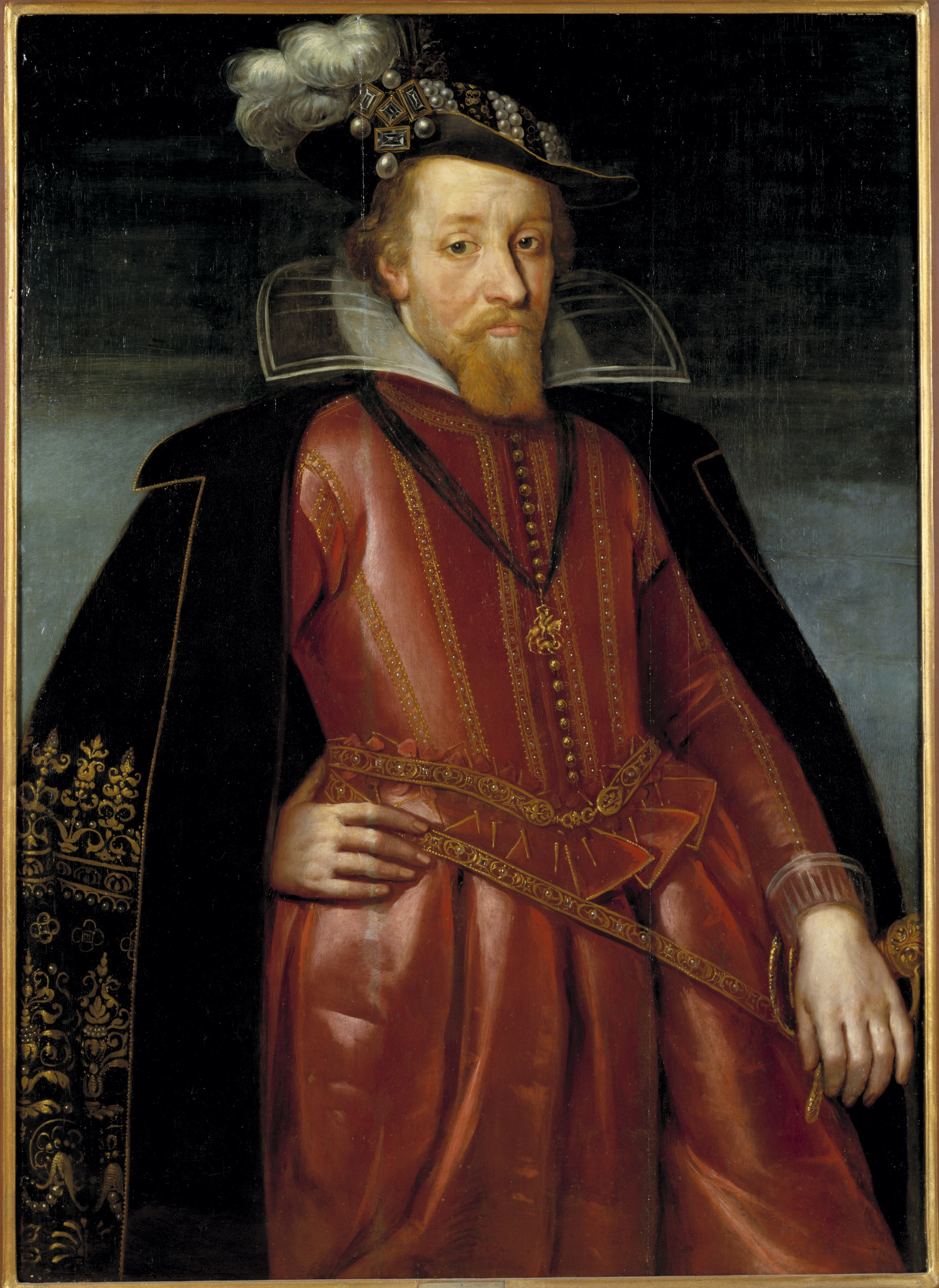
James VI and I wearing the Three Brothers jewel, Nationalmuseum, Gripsholm Castle.

When Princess Elizabeth, later Queen of Bohemia, was at York in June 1603, on her way from Scotland, James VI sent her a chain of pearls (which presumably had belonged to Elizabeth I). Elizabeth swopped the pearls with her mother, Anna of Denmark, for a set of ruby buttons. These ruby buttons may be the four-leafed roses of rubies depicted on a portrait of Elizabeth at the National Maritime Museum at Greenwich. Elizabeth was sent to live at Coombe Abbey, near Coventry, and in 1607 her father sent her a jewel consisting of a diamond, a ruby, and a pendant pearl.

James wore a black suit and a "diamond in his hatte of a wonderfull greate value" at her wedding in 1613. Afterwards, Elizabeth gave the set of ruby buttons to her maid of honour Frances Tyrrell. Tyrrell left Elizabeth's service in 1615 and travelled to London. King James discovered that she had a set of ruby studded buttons which Elizabeth had given to her, was displeased, and made enquiries. Elizabeth explained in a letter to Ralph Winwood that she had given Tyrrell the buttons in recompense for her service. Elizabeth offered to take the buttons back and give Tyrrell the money instead. Her master of household, Hans Meinhard von Schönberg, made the arrangements for Tyrrell to receive £300. George Calvert brought the buttons back to Heidelberg. Many years later, Elizabeth wrote to Frances, now Lady Broughton, at Marchweil, and mentioned the "business of the buttons".

James was also unhappy to hear that Elizabeth had pawned a royal jewel with Jacob Harderet, to cover her expenses travelling to Heidelberg in 1613 and giving gifts to her many well-wishers. Before she left England, Elizabeth had sent some of Jacob Harderet's bills for the tokens given to her "affectionate friends" to Sir Julius Caesar, the Chancellor of the Exchequer, hoping that they would be allowed for payment by her father.

It was reported in June 1620 that James VI had given jewels to the secretary Baron Dona, an envoy of Frederick V of the Palatinate, to be pledged to raise money.

=== Jewels and the Duchess of Lennox ===
Joseph Mead related a story of life at court in May 1622, concerning Frances Stewart, Duchess of Lennox, the third wife of Esmé Stewart's son Ludovic Stewart, 2nd Duke of Lennox. King James asked for a gold chain to give to an ambassador as a parting gift. A chain that had belonged to Anne of Denmark was brought for his approval, but he thought it was too valuable. Prince Charles suggested that he should instead present this chain to Frances Stewart, the new Duchess of Lennox. The King agreed, and Charles presented the chain to her and placed it around her neck. According to Joseph Mead, this made Mary Villiers, Countess of Buckingham jealous and she decided to acquire the chain by sending a messenger to the Duchess, pretending the King had asked for its return. Frances Stewart was surprised, and questioned the messenger and the fraud was exposed. The Countess of Buckingham was asked to leave court for a while. Mead wrote that this court gossip came from Sir William Bourser of Uppingham.

However, the story Mead heard was likely a rumour to discredit the Countess of Buckingham, based on well-documented gifts of jewellery at court. Records show that the Duchess of Lennox was given a jewel set with diamonds in the form of the letter "H" around this time (which had belonged to Anne of Denmark), and she had already been given a New Year's Day gift of a gold collar set with rubies, diamonds, and pearls, (which represented the roses of York and Lancaster). The Countess of Buckingham also received a gold collar at New Year.

=== Spanish Match ===
In 1623, Prince Charles travelled with the Duke of Buckingham to Spain to attempt to contract a marriage with Maria Anna of Spain, an adventure known as the Spanish Match. Thomas Edmondes and George Heriot chose jewels from the Jewel House at the Tower of London, and Heriot refurbished them. James sent Charles and Buckingham parcels of jewels, including several pieces that had belonged to his wife, Anne of Denmark, to wear and give to Spanish royals and courtiers.

Robert, Lord Carey of Leppington took jewels to Spain, including the Three Brothers or the "Three Brethren, newly set" (by George Heriot), and a second parcel was entrusted to a distant cousin, Francis Stuart, who served in the navy. Stuart sailed to Castile in the St George with a parcel of jewels that included the jewelled sword presented to Henry Frederick, Prince of Wales during the masque Tethys' Festival, the "Portugal diamond", the "Cobham pearl", jewelled head attires, and a ring with a diamond frog and a ruby set in its head.

James wrote letters to Charles and Buckingham giving advice about their gift giving. A locket with his portrait and a mirror was intended for the Infanta's girdle. The largest pear pendant diamond should be worn at the "midst of her forehead". James noted that Buckingham's wife Katherine Villiers, Duchess of Buckingham, had included a pearl chain which had been his gift to her, and it would be unlucky to give away his presents to her. Among six jewels sent to be their parting gifts at the Spanish court, James advised a watch was "richest and fittest" for an old lady and a ring was the "noblest".

Charles wrote two warrants in Madrid at the end of August 1623 with the names of the potential Spanish recipients of his gifts, and jewels described in detail, and these were published by William Prynne in his Hidden Workes of Darkenes Brought to Publike Light (1645). According to these warrants, Inés de Zúñiga y Velasco, Countess of Olivares, would have received an "I" made of two table diamonds and a diamond cut in facets, also described as a "column", with a pendant pearl and diamond. Charles bought a diamond cross from one his companions, Edmund Verney, as a gift for Don Maria de Lande. The cross was a vintage piece, said to have belonged to Verney's ancestor Anne Weston who had been a servant of Elizabeth of York and Catherine of Aragon.

A list of gifts exchanged were published in a French pamphlet in 1623 as Presens admirables du Roy d'Espagne au prince de Gales et ceux du prince de Gales reciproquement faicts au Roy d'Espagne, à l'Infante Dona Maria, which includes an anchor set with five diamonds for the Infanta valued at 8,000 ducats and a cross for the Countess of Olivares valued at 6,000 ducats. Buckingham received a diamond hat band valued at 24,000 ducats. Charles received crossbows, pistols, and a picture of Venus by Titian.

James Howell described the return of some the jewels in a letter included in his Epistolae Ho-Elianae. Howell said Charles and Buckingham left the jewels with a Spanish secretary of state until the wedding day, the Infante "waiving to receive them". As the marriage plan foundered the jewels were returned. Howell mentions a great table diamond of 18 carats intended as a gift for Gaspar de Guzmán, Count-Duke of Olivares, this was the "Portugal diamond". When the convoy of ships, including the Mary Rose, carrying the jewels landed at Plymouth there was a tempest. Howell rode to James at Theobalds with the news that the jewels were safe.

In 1625, Buckingham requested James send a valuable jewel shaped like an anchor, which would outshine a recent gift from the son of Duke of Savoy, as a present for Henrietta Maria newly betrothed to Prince Charles. Thomas Carey was sent to France with a "rich and rare Jewel".

=== Buckingham and Sackville Crowe ===
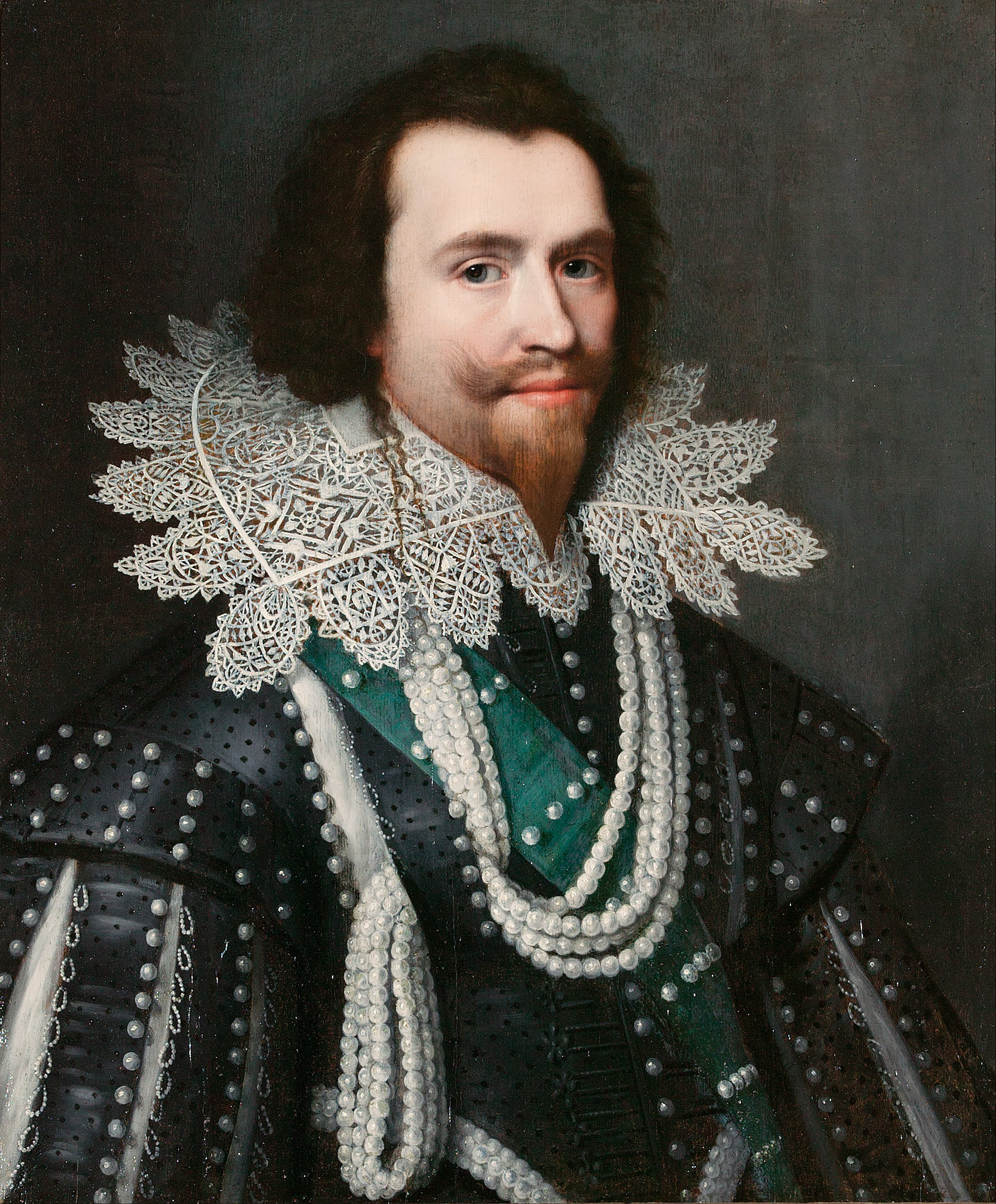
George Villiers, 1st Duke of Buckingham tried to sell the royal jewels to raise funds.

After the death of King James, some of his jewels and plate, with jewels which had belonged to Anne of Denmark, were sent to the Low Countries and The Hague to raise money for Charles I, to fund the navy and the alliance in the Thirty Years War made by the Treaty of The Hague (1625). There was already a long history of pawning royal jewels. This scheme was devised by the Duke of Buckingham. In October 1625, the auditor Francis Gofton was asked to make a list of suitable jewels. Fulke Greville, 1st Baron Brooke, the former Chancellor, was asked for any jewels remaining in his custody, and Henry Mildmay, Master of the Jewel House was asked for jewels of value.

On 8 November, Spencer, Lord Compton, who served as Master of the King's Robes delivered jewels to two courtiers of Charles I, Lord Conway and Endymion Porter, at Hampton Court. These included the famous diamond hat jewel known as the Mirror of Great Britain (now configured with a diamond instead of a ruby, which James had given to Anne of Denmark), a gold feather set with diamonds, a jewel called the "Brethren" or the "Three Brothers", collets (segments set with precious stones) from collars with the ciphers of Anne of Denmark and James, a hatband of two ropes of pearls, and the jewel in shape of an initial "J" or "I". It was hoped the jewels could be mortgaged for £300,000.

A few of these pieces and some of Buckingham's own jewels and some royal silver plate were pawned by the Duke of Buckingham and his agent Sackville Crowe. The Venetian ambassador in the Netherlands, Alvise Contarini, noted that Henry Mildmay came to Amsterdam with Crowe. Crowe took charge of the potential pledges at The Hague on 29 November 1625. Crowe and a merchant financier in Amsterdam, Philip Calandrini, obtained money from Frederick V of the Palatinate. The money was supposed to be paid to Christian IV of Denmark for his involvement in the Hague alliance, and two regiments would be recruited for him in Scotland. The Scottish-born Danish diplomat Robert Anstruther pursued these commitments. To help secure the Scottish troops for Denmark, Buckingham arranged the marriage of his niece Ann Villiers to Robert Douglas, the son of William Douglas, 7th Earl of Morton.

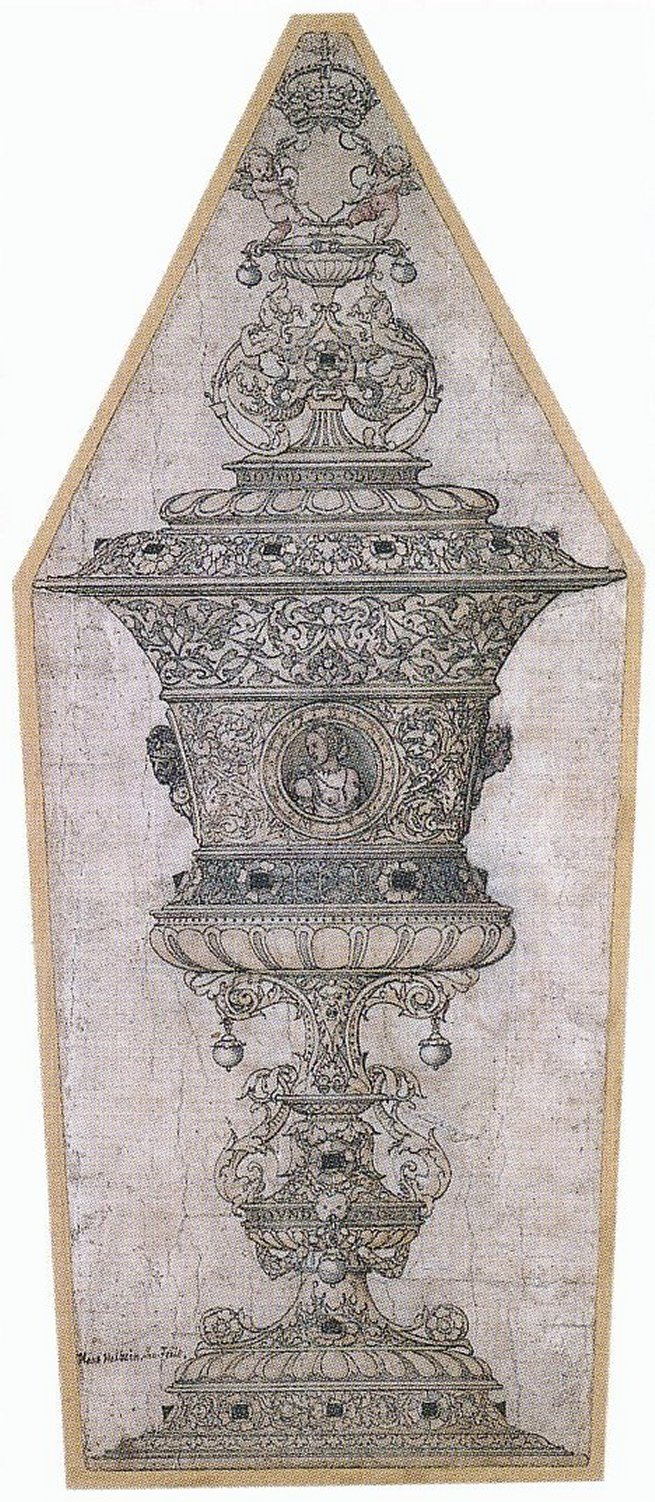
Tudor heirlooms sent to Amsterdam to be pawned or sold in 1625 included Jane Seymour's cup, designed by Hans Holbein, Ashmolean

The jewels selected at the Tower on 26 October 1625 "to be carried into Holland" included a consignment of forty items of gold and silver gilt plate set with jewels, luxurious tableware to be displayed on cupboards rather than costume accessories. A set of twelve gold fruit dishes were engraved with the arms of Denmark, and a gold cup had been a gift to King James, a gold cup presented by the Inner Temple as a New Year's Day gift in 1610. Another gold cup in the list had the arms of Jane Seymour and can be related to a drawing by Hans Holbein. One vintage piece was a vessel called a "laire" or "layer" which comprised a gold mounted nautilus shell with a handle formed of an "antique man" and a spout set with diamonds. Sackville Crowe later recorded that this "laire" was pawned to Samuel and David Godyn or Godin, and was subsequently sold in 1629 to William Scarborow for £2390. The Godyn brothers gave loans on several other Tudor heirlooms, such as a looking glass set with a clock and the armorial of Elizabeth I which had originally belonged to Henry VIII. Crowe pawned a fabulous gold cup known as the "Dream of Paris" with the Judgement of Paris and his horse modelled on its cover to Nicholas Sohier and Samuel Becker. Sohier was a merchant and a noted art-collector, and a friend of Constantijn Huygens, his house, the Huis met de Hoofden, can still be seen in Amsterdam.

Between £30,000 and £58,400 was raised by Buckingham and Crowe's efforts. Most of the jewels sent to the Low Countries in 1625 could not be sold or pawned. On 8 February 1626, Sackville Crowe and Philip Calandrini made a protest to the States General at The Hague, showing that Charles I could not meet his treaty commitments without the money. Dudley Carleton thought the most "vendible" jewels would realise £40,000 with the help of Vanlore and Burlamachi's network of financiers. Sackville Crowe reported that the Dutch were unwilling to purchase the royal jewels, believing they belonged to the crown rather than King Charles, and the forthcoming Parliament might object. Sir John Eliot, formerly an ally of Buckingham, argued that James should not mortgage the jewels for wars in Parliament. The ships The Nonsuch and The Garland with an escort were sent to bring Crowe and the remaining jewels back from Amsterdam in May 1626.

According to Joseph Avery, in 1627 a collar of great balas rubies with knots of pearls, which had been sent to Spain and may have belonged to Henry VIII, was to be pledged on behalf of Christian IV to support the soldiers of Charles Morgan. Christian IV was disappointed with this arrangement, writing "Let God and the world judge whether this be answerable or Christian-like dealing", and it was suggested the money from the pledged jewel could be used in an arrangement with the Dutch East India Company instead. Subsequently, this same Tudor ruby collar was used as a pledge in 1641 for a loan brokered by Jonas Abeels, an associate of Philip Calandrini and the financier Philip Burlamachi, who worked for Henrietta Maria.

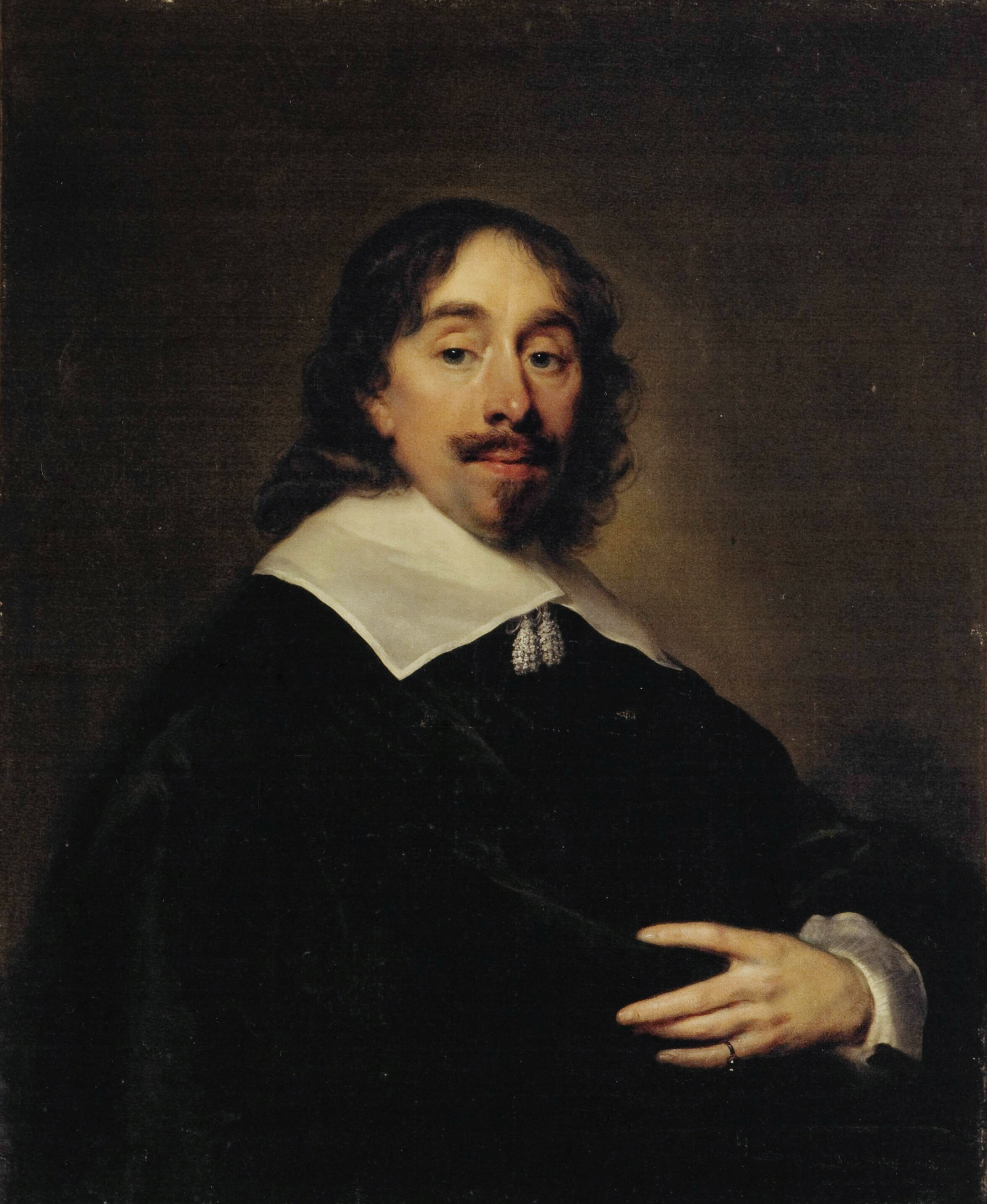
Thomas Cletcher or Cletscher.

Philip Jacobson, the court jeweller, appraised more items to be pawned with or by Philip Calandrini in June 1629, including the two "great halfround pearls" from the Mirror of Great Britain. In 1634, some of the pieces pledged by Crowe, including the "Three Brothers", were in the hands of Garret van Schoonhoven and Francis Vanhoven of Amsterdam. Charles I gave Sir William Boswell and the London goldsmith Nathaniel Gerrard a commission to redeem and dispose of some of these jewels. Gerrard quarrelled with the financier Philip Burlamachi over the value of the jewels.

=== Cletcher's book ===
Some of the jewels from the court of James VI and I were recorded in an illustrated manuscript made by Thomas Cletcher (1598–1668), a nephew of the court painter Daniël Mijtens. The jewels were brought to The Hague by Henrietta Maria of France in 1642, despite the opposition of Parliament. Cletcher worked with Joachim de Wicquefort (a brother of Abraham de Wicquefort) to market the jewels. Cletcher's book is held by the Museum Boijmans Van Beuningen in Rotterdam.

The Cletcher drawings include; a diamond hat jewel made for James, similar to the Mirror of Great Britain, which can be related to the workshop of Arnold Lulls; the Sancy diamond; the diamond known as the "Mirror of Portugal"; and the Cobham diamond. The Sancy diamond, once part of the Mirror of Great Britain, is now displayed in the Galerie d'Apollon of the Louvre Palace.

== External links and portraits ==
- 1580s portrait of James VI displayed at Edinburgh Castle attributed to Adrian Vanson
- 1580s engraved portrait of James VI by Jean Rabel
- 1580s engraved portrait of James VI by Jean Rabel, another version
