= Weatherby (disambiguation) =

Weatherby is an American gun manufacturer.

Weatherby may also refer to:

== Places ==
- Weatherby, Missouri, a village in DeKalb County, Missouri, United States
- Weatherby, Oregon, an unincorporated community in Baker County, Oregon, United States
- Weatherby Lake, Missouri, a city in Platte County Missouri, United States

== Characters ==
- Weatherby, a character in the 2006 film DOA: Dead or Alive
- Weatherby Swann, a character in Disney's Pirates of the Caribbean movies
- Weatherby, the name Barty Crouch Sr. calls Percy Weasley in the Harry Potter series, because he always forgets that his last name is "Weasley"

== Other ==
- Weatherby (surname)

== See also ==
- Weatherbys central administration for British horseracing
- Weathersby, a surname
- Weatherbee, a surname
- Wetherby (disambiguation)
