= Treaty of The Hague (1625) =

Treaty of mutual defence between the Stuart Kingdoms, the Dutch Republic, and Denmark-Norway

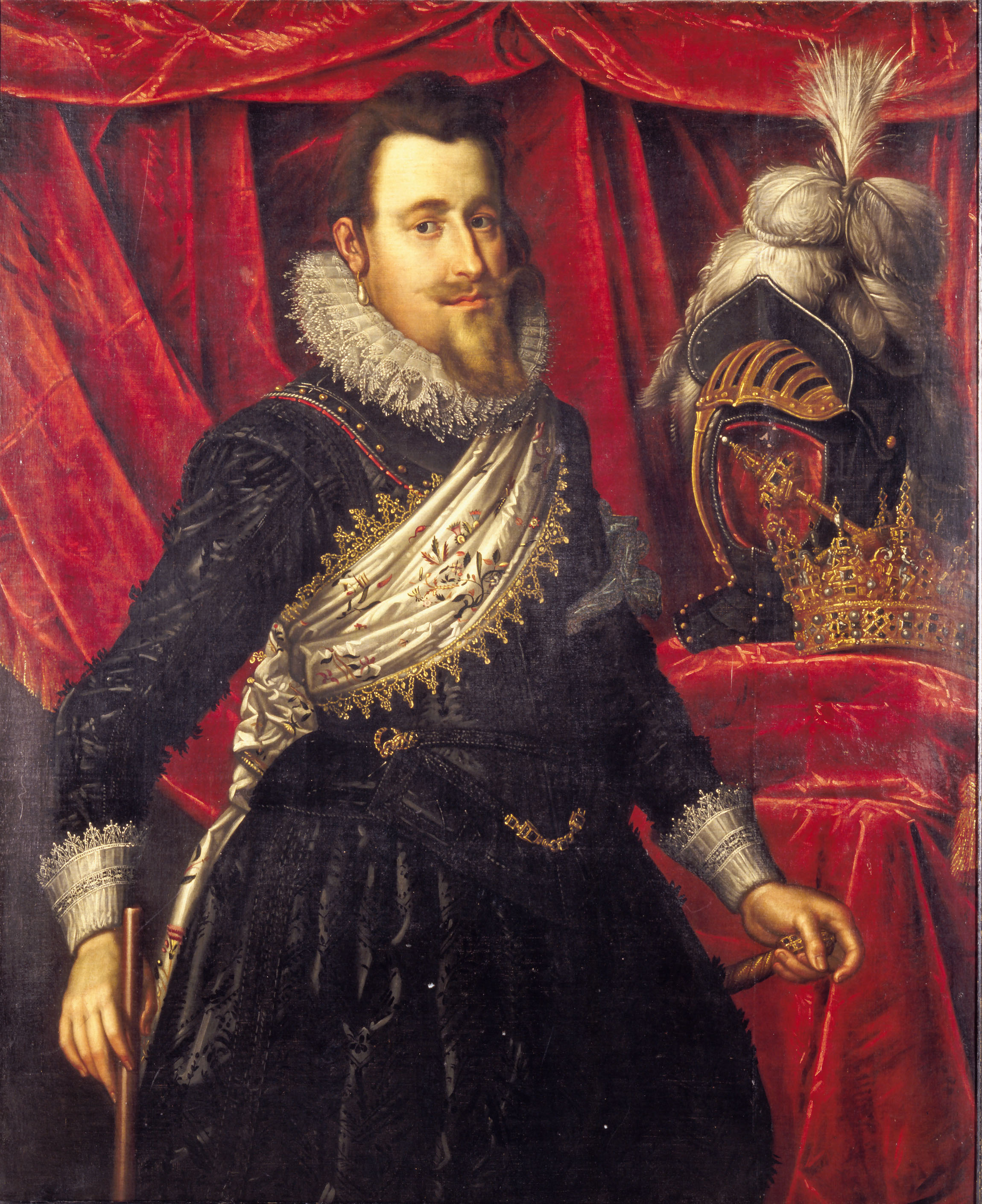
- Christian IV of Denmark-Norway
- Signed: 9 December 1625
- Location: The Hague
- Negotiators: (Kingdom of England) Dudley Carleton, George Villiers
- Original signatories: (Denmark–Norway) Christian IV; (Dutch Republic) Frederick Henry
- Parties: England; Dutch Republic; Denmark–Norway
- Languages: French

The Treaty of The Hague (1625), also known as the Treaty of Den Haag, was signed on 9 December 1625 between England, the Dutch Republic and Denmark-Norway.

Under the treaty, the English and Dutch provided Christian IV of Denmark-Norway with financial support for Danish intervention in the Thirty Years War. Intended as the basis of an international coalition against Emperor Ferdinand II, additional parties were invited to join, including France, Sweden, the Republic of Venice, Savoy, Transylvania, and any other members of the Holy Roman Empire, although they failed to do so.

George Villiers, 1st Duke of Buckingham and his agent Sackville Crowe attempted to raise money for the alliance by pawning royal jewels and plate in The Hague and Amsterdam, but were not wholly successful and many of the jewels were returned to England.

== See also ==
- List of treaties
- Thirty Years' War

== Sources ==
- Davenport, Frances Gardiner (1917). European Treaties Bearing on the History of the United States and Its Dependencies (2014 ed.). Literary Licensing. ISBN 978-1498144469
