= Wetherbee =

Wetherbee is a surname, a variant of Weathersby. Notable people with the surname include:

- Emily Greene Wetherbee (1839-1897), American poet, author and educator
- Fritz Wetherbee (born 1936), American writer and television host
- George Faulkner Wetherbee (1851–1920), American painter
- Jim Wetherbee (born 1952), American astronaut

== See also ==
- Mr. Weatherbee, Wendy Weatherbee, and Tony Weatherbee; characters in Archie Comics
