= Nicholas Eversfield (MP for Hastings) =

English politician

Nicholas Eversfield (c.1584–1629) was an English landowner and politician who sat in the House of Commons between 1624 and 1629.

Eversfield was probably the son of Thomas Eversfield of Grove, Hastings. He matriculated from Trinity College, Cambridge in about 1595 and was awarded BA in 1599. He was admitted at Gray's Inn on 3 May 1602.

He was High Sheriff of Sussex for 1619–20. In 1624, he was elected Member of Parliament for Hastings in the Happy Parliament. He was re-elected MP for Hastings in 1625, 1626 and 1628 and sat until 1629 when King Charles decided to rule without parliament for eleven years.

Eversfield married Dorothy Goring, daughter of Edward Goring of Oakhurst. His sons Edward, John, Anthony and Thomas became MPs.

Parliament of England
Preceded by Samuel Moore; James Lasher	Member of Parliament for Hastings; 1624–1629; With: Samuel Moore 1624; Sackville Crowe 1625; John Ashburnham 1628-29	Parliament suspended until 1640
