= Sir Sackville Crowe, 1st Baronet =

English politician

Sir Sackville Crowe, 1st Baronet (7 December 1595 (baptised) – 27 October 1671) was an English politician.

== Family background ==
He was born in Brasted, Kent, in around 1595, the son of William Crowe of Socketts or Stockets, and Anne, daughter of John Sackville. Early in 1617, he secured a reversionary lease of the former Perrot lordship of Laugharne from Charles, Prince of Wales which grant fell in on the death of Dorothy Percy, Countess of Northumberland, in April 1619 and he took up residence there.

Sackville Crowe married Mary Manners (born 1612), a daughter of Sir George Manners of Haddon and Grace, a daughter of Sir Henry Pierrepont. They had one son, also named Sackville, born around 1636 and who died in 1706.

== Career ==
He was a Member of Parliament for Hastings in the 1625 Parliament (the "Useless Parliament") and for Bramber in the 1628-9 Parliament.

The Duke of Buckingham sent him to Amsterdam in 1625 with some of his jewels and the jewels of James VI and I to try to raise money for the navy and fund the alliance made by the Treaty of The Hague (1625). He was accompanied by the Master of the Jewel House, Henry Mildmay. On 8 February 1626, Sackville Crowe and the financier Philip Calandrini made a protest to the States General at The Hague, showing that Charles I could not meet his treaty commitments without the money.

Crowe was Treasurer of the Navy from 5 April 1627 to 21 January 1630; on 8 July 1627 he was created a baronet. The King nominated Sir Sackville to be ambassador at Constantinople on 19 November 1633 during the personal rule. Royal instructions were delivered on 14 July 1638.

In 1636 he obtained a share of a lease on the Crown's ironworks in the Forest of Dean for twenty-one years, which he later tried to sell; this caused some great legal trouble, and had to be brought before Parliament. Nonetheless, it did not prevent Sir Sackville sailing for Constantinople in October 1638.

He later served as the Ambassador to the Ottoman Empire at Constantinople. James Howell wrote to him in August 1639 describing naval battles. In April 1642 the records of the House of Commons mention objections made to Crowe's "meddling" by the Levant Company. By 1646 they had progressed to formally requesting a letter of withdrawal be sent, citing his "seizing the Estates, and imprisoning the Factors and Servants, of the said Company, at Constantinople and Smyrna". Crowe was recalled after nearly a decade by Parliament in January 1647. Perhaps the ambassador had not received news of Royalist defeat because he did not finally depart until 23 November.

He was brought back in April 1648, as a prisoner in the ship Margaret and consigned to the Tower of London to await trial. In March 1652 he was bailed on a £2000 bond; by September 1658 the Levant Company had dropped all charges and he petitioned the Lords to annul his restraints.

== Account book ==
One account book kept by Sackville Crowe was copied by an antiquary Ralph Thoresby. Thoresby's copy was purchased by Horace Walpole and is now held as British Library Additional Manuscript 12528. The account, covering the years 1623 to 1627, is an important source for historians, giving details of payments which Crowe made on behalf of the Duke of Buckingham.

Parliament of England
Preceded by Nicholas Eversfield; Samuel Moore	Member of Parliament for Hastings; 1625; With: Nicholas Eversfield	Succeeded by Nicholas Eversfield; Sir Dudley Carleton
Preceded by Sir Thomas Bowyer; Walter Barttelot	Member of Parliament for Bramber; 1628–1629; With: Sir Thomas Bowyer	Parliament suspended until 1640
Political offices
Preceded by Sir William Russell	Treasurer of the Navy; 1627–1630	Succeeded by Sir William Russell
Diplomatic posts
Preceded by Sir Peter Wyche	British ambassador to the Ottoman Empire c. 1641–1646	Succeeded by Sir Thomas Bendish
Baronetage of England
New creation	Baronet (of Llanherne); 1627–1671	Succeeded by Sackville Crowe
