= Crowe baronets =

Hereditary title in the Baronetage of England

The Crowe Baronetcy, of Llanherne in the County of Carmarthen, was a title in the Baronetage of England. It was created on 8 July 1627 for the politician Sackville Crowe. The title became extinct on the death of his son, the second Baronet, in 1706.

== Crowe baronets, of Llanherne (1627) ==
- Sir Sackville Crowe, 1st Baronet (died 1683)
- Sir Sackville Crowe, 2nd Baronet (c. 1637–1706)
