= William Harbord (cricketer) =

English cricketer

Personal information
- Full name: William Edward Harbord
- Born: 15 December 1908; Manton, Rutland, England
- Died: 28 July 1992 (aged 83); Harrogate, Yorkshire, England
- Batting: Right-handed

Domestic team information
- Years: Team
- 1929 to 1935: Yorkshire

Career statistics
Competition	First-class
Matches	21
Runs scored	512
Batting average	18.28
100s/50s	1/1
Top score	109
Balls bowled	24
Wickets	0
Bowling average	–
5 wickets in innings	–
10 wickets in match	–
Best bowling	–
Catches/stumpings	9/0
- Source: Cricinfo, 5 June 2019

William Edward Harbord (15 December 1908 – 28 July 1992) played first-class cricket for Yorkshire County Cricket Club as an amateur player between 1929 and 1935. He also played once for Oxford University in 1930 and for the Marylebone Cricket Club (MCC) in 1934 and 1935. He appeared for Yorkshire's Second XI in the Minor Counties Championship competition between 1928 and 1933, and for a Minor Counties representative side in a non-first-class match in 1934.

Born in Manton, Rutland, Harbord was a right-handed batsman, who scored 512 runs at 18.28 with his top score, his only century, 109, coming for Yorkshire against Oxford University in 1930. He also scored 63* against Cambridge University. He was one of the few Yorkshire players not born in the county in the years before the club lifted this restriction in 1992.

Harbord went on two international cricket tours: with H. M. Martineau's side to Egypt in 1934, and then with the official MCC side to the West Indies in 1934–35. Four Tests were played on that West Indies tour, but Harbord did not play in any of them, although he did appear in four other first-class matches there. He was twelfth man for the first two Tests, then interrupted his tour to take a private trip to Miami.

He served on the Yorkshire committee for many years, becoming a vice-president. His brother-in-law, John Atkinson-Clark, played eight games for Middlesex from 1930 to 1932.

Harbord was married and divorced twice. Each marriage produced two children. He was deputy chairman of John Smith's Brewery in Tadcaster.

He died in Harrogate, Yorkshire. Harbord's great grandfathers include abolitionist and prison reformer Edward Harbord, 3rd Baron Suffield and Edward Wyndham Harrington Schenley.
