= Racing Calendar =

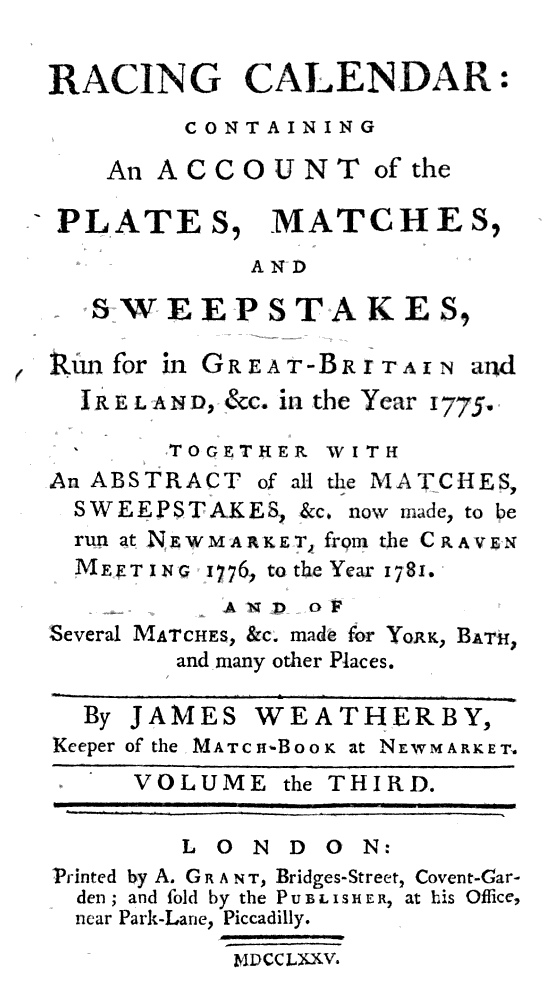
Racing Calendar (1775)

Racing Calendar is the official horseracing publication of the Jockey Club.

Its first predecessor came when John Cheny (fl.1727–1750) published the first calendar in 1727, titled An Historical List of Horse-Matches Run, and maintained annual publication until his death in 1750. Reginald Heber took over publication in 1751, with his final volume being published in 1768. Benjamin Walker kept the publication going for two more years. Several other competing calendars appeared after Cheny's death, by various publishers, including John Pond's Sporting Kalendar, published 1751–1757, and William Tuting and Thomas Fawconer's The Sporting Calendar, published until 1772.

In 1773, James Weatherby, who in 1770 had been appointed at Keeper of the Math Book for the Jockey Club, began publishing the Racing Calendar. His nephew, also James Weatherby, helped with the publishing, establishing the family business of Weatherbys, which continued to own and publish the calendar until 1902 when the Jockey Club finally purchased it.
