= Thomas Lyte (antiquary) =

Jacobean antiquary and historian

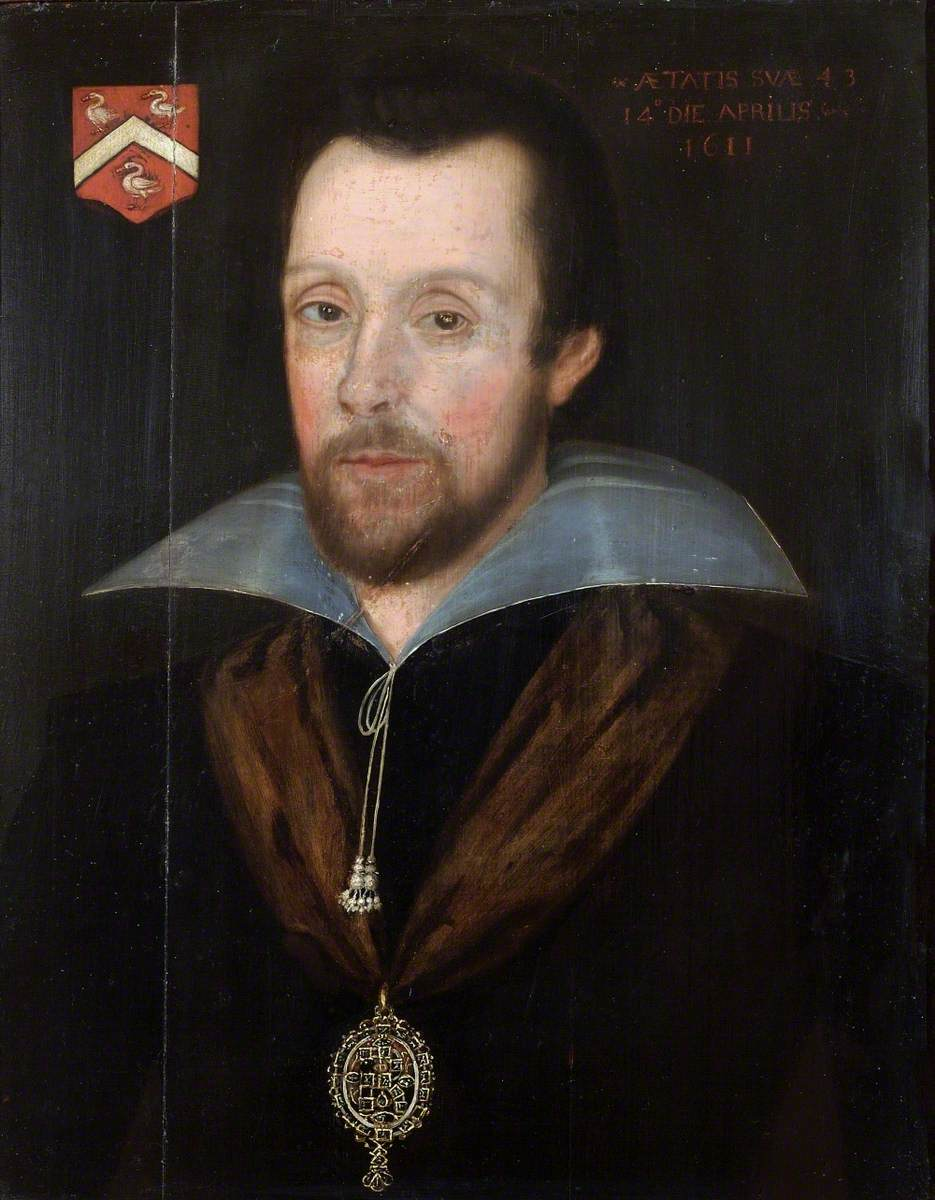
Thomas Lyte in 1611, shown wearing the Lyte Jewel.

Thomas Lyte (1568–1638) of Lytes Cary was a Jacobean antiquary and historian.

== Background ==
Thomas Lyte was the son of Henry Lyte of Lytes Cary in Somerset. He was educated at Sherborne, and a member of Clifford's Inn and Middle Temple.

== Antiquary and historian ==
A student of history and antiquity, Lyte is best remembered today for drawing up a most royally ennobled genealogy of James I, known as the Lyte Pedigree, which he presented to the king. In return James I gave Lyte a pendant jewel containing a miniature portrait of himself as a young man by Nicholas Hilliard in an oval gold frame set with twenty-five square table diamonds and four rose diamonds, with a cover in open-work with diamonds on the outside and enamel within. Known as the Lyte Jewel, the picture formed part of the Waddesdon Bequest and is now in the British Museum.

The antiquary Anthony Wood of Oxford described Lyte as "a gentleman studious of all good knowledge".
