= Witherby =

Witherby is a surname, and may refer to:

- Harry Forbes Witherby (1873–1943), British publisher and ornithologist
- Russ Witherby (born 1962), American figure skater
- Thomas Witherby (1719–1797), of London, founder of Witherbys, one of the UK's oldest publishers now known as the Witherby Publishing Group
