= John Atkinson-Clark =

English cricketer

John Cecil Atkinson-Clark (9 July 1912 – 2 October 1969) was an English first-class cricketer active 1930–32 who played for Middlesex.

Atkinson-Clark attended Eton College. He married Molly Harbord, sister of the cricketer William Harbord, in 1953. They had one child, a son.
