= Oatlands, Surrey =

Village in Surrey, England

Coordinates: 51.373°N 0.438°W

Oatlands
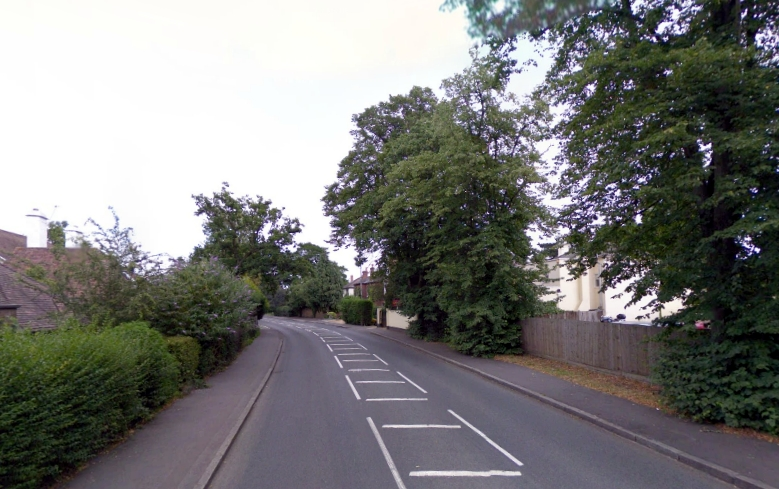
- Weybridge end of Oatlands Drive

- Location within Surrey
- Area: 2.07 km^{2} (0.80 sq mi)
- Population: 6,352 (2011 census)
  - Density: 3,069/km^{2} (7,950/sq mi)
- OS grid reference: TQ 088 649
- Civil parish: n/a
- District: Elmbridge
- Shire county: Surrey
- Region: South East
- Country: England
- Sovereign state: United Kingdom
- Post town: Weybridge
- Postcode district: KT13
- Dialling code: 01932
- Police: Surrey
- Fire: Surrey
- Ambulance: South East Coast
- UK Parliament: Esher and Walton

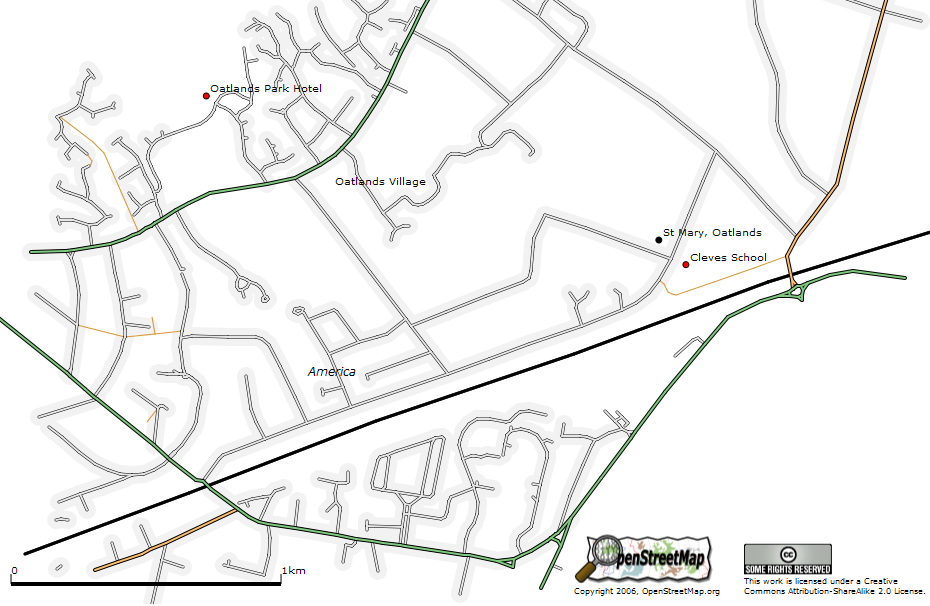
Oatlands Village is defined by the roads north of the South West Main Line between Walton on Thames and Weybridge town centres, widely shown by road signs and road names containing the word 'Oatlands'

Oatlands is a village in the north of the English county of Surrey, contiguous with the towns of Weybridge to the west and Walton on Thames to the east, and set on low, verdant ridges partially overlooking the River Thames. Oatlands acquired its name from the Royal Tudor and Stuart Oatlands Palace, which was built for Henry VIII to the north of Weybridge town centre. (Note: Oatlands Park Hotel was built in the former deer park of Oatlands Palace.) Before acquiring its first place of worship it was part of Walton on Thames, and shortly after thereby becoming a village did not qualify for post town status and instead its post town became Weybridge. The towns it adjoins have their centres 1 mile (1.6 km) away. Oatlands has a park, parade of shops, one pub, one Working Men's Club, and three schools.

Administratively its borough of Elmbridge electoral ward is Oatlands Park, and its Surrey electoral division is Walton South and Oatlands.

== Geography ==
The village is elevated from the London Basin and has gentle slopes down to the old village in a slight dip and to Walton-on-Thames. The roads are characterised by many avenues and garden-fronted properties surrounded by parkland, no intersection by any major roads, with low rise apartments being a relatively common feature. The Weybridge Club spa resort and Broadwater lie to the north of the Oatlands Park Hotel within the lower London Basin. Several fine elevated views can be enjoyed from apartments on Oatlands Drive, reflected in names such as Ridgemount, Broadwater Place, Lakeside, Oakhill Gardens and Tower Grove. The architecture across the village is predominantly of classical, Georgian inspiration to complement the small group of terraced houses dating from the 18th and 19th centuries and grander, detached Georgian houses bordering on the approach to Monument Hill, which links Oatlands to Weybridge town centre. There are no dual carriageways around or within the village. The closest railway station is Walton-on-Thames, 1/2 mile (800 m) from St Marys, Oatlands church to the south-east of the village, with a 25-minute one stop service in the mornings and evenings to London Waterloo.

=== Soil ===
The soil even in the majority of the upland parts has few pockets of sand (supporting fern, gorse, bog and conifers) compared to Weybridge Heath and the large areas of West Surrey former proper heath on the Bagshot sand, with the general mixture of gravel and alluvial deposits producing medium fertility and naturally conducive to open pasture or orchards.

== Amenities ==
In an approximately 4 acres (1.6 ha) park with outdoor pool and play areas, Oatlands Park is set back on its own drive on the south side of Oatlands Drive. This is opposite the Oatlands Park Hotel, the 19th Century building sited in the grounds of the former royal palace. There is a parade of cafés, fishing and hunting shop, boutiques and a traditional pub in a very small suburban vale in the district. Oatlands Infants school and Cleves School Junior School are within Oatlands.

The district of Oatlands contains an Iron Age burial ground, believed to be in the vicinity of St Mary Oatlands church.

== Places of worship ==
The parish of Oatlands exists in the Anglican church also known as St Mary Oatlands. Originally a chapel built in 1862, the parish church was ordained in 1867 and the parish of St Mary Walton in Walton-on-Thames was divided to reflect the increase in population owing to local industrialisation and commuter villas. Vicars have changed in 2005 (Revs Malcolm Anker, Andrew Parsons) and in 2010 (Rev Steve Brunn). In 2012 St Mary celebrated 150 years. On 4 July 2017, Revd. Folorunso (Folli) Olokose was installed as the Vicar of the church by Rt Revd Andrew Watson, Bishop of Guildford.

The Christian Science Church founded by Mary Baker Eddy (not to be confused with The Church of Scientology) has a major centre of worship on Oatlands Drive in Oatlands.

The North West Surrey Synagogue is in Rosslyn Park, Oatlands.

== Demography and housing ==
2011 Census Homes
Output area	Detached	Semi-detached	Terraced	Flats and apartments	Caravans/temporary/mobile homes	shared between households
(ward)	923	298	651	790	0	0

The average level of accommodation in the region composed of detached houses was 28%, the average that was apartments was 22.6%.

2011 Census Key Statistics
Output area	Population	Households	% Owned outright	% Owned with a loan	hectares
(ward)	6,352	2,662	39	38	207

The proportion of households in the village who owned their home outright compares to the regional average of 35.1%. The proportion who owned their home with a loan compares to the regional average of 32.5%. The remaining % is made up of rented dwellings (plus a negligible % of households living rent-free).

== Notable residents ==
- Henry Stuart, Duke of Gloucester (1640–1660), at Oatlands Park.
- William Boteler (fl. 1640s and 1650s), lived at Oatlands Park in the 1660s, he was a member of the Parliament and one of the major-generals during the Rule of the Major-Generals
- Princess Frederica Charlotte of Prussia (1767–1820), Duchess of York, at Oatlands Park (House).
- Madeleine Albright, 64th United States Secretary of State, went to the school in Oatlands which has been converted into flats next to a large pub/restaurant, The Oatlands Chaser – formerly known as the Badger's Rest and The King's Manor.
- William Chapman Hewitson (1806–1878), naturalist and lepidopterist. From 1848 lived in Oatlands Park and built a house there.
