= Weatherbys =

British conglomerate

Weatherbys Ltd.
- Type: Private
- Industry: Conglomerate
- Founded: 1770; 254 years ago
- Headquarters: Wellingborough, Northamptonshire, England
- Number of locations: Wellingborough; London; Edinburgh; Ireland; Newmarket; Penrith; Swindon
- Key people: Martin Radvan (Chairman); Russell Ferris (CEO)
- Services: Private banking; Financial planning; Wealth management; Asset finance; Insurance broking; Racing banking; Horseracing administration; Thoroughbred registration; Publishing; Bloodstock data; Genomic testing
- Number of employees: Approximately 500
- Subsidiaries: Weatherbys Bank Ltd; Arkle Finance Ltd; Weatherbys Hamilton LLP; Weatherbys Ltd; Weatherbys GSB Ltd; Weatherbys Ireland GSB Ltd; Point-to-Point Racing Co Ltd; Weatherbys Scientific
- Website: weatherbys.co.uk

Weatherbys Ltd is a UK conglomerate involved in a wide range of activities largely within banking and horse racing. The original business was founded by James Weatherby in 1770.

== History ==
James Weatherby was appointed to serve the Jockey Club as its secretary and stakeholder in 1770. He was an able and entrepreneurial man and over the next 25 years laid strong foundations for the business.

Under his aegis, his first racing calendar was published in 1773, followed, in 1791, by the publication of the General Stud Book, a definitive record of the pedigrees of approximately 400 horses which became the foundation for all thoroughbred bloodstock worldwide. He was assisted in this by his nephew, whose work on racehorse pedigrees dovetailed neatly with James's racing work.

Weatherbys has continued in the role of administrators to the Jockey Club. Today, every data detail relating to horses, owners, trainers, jockeys, stable employees and races is processed through Weatherbys. All of the 10,500 Thoroughbred races held in Britain each year are drawn together at the company's Northamptonshire HQ. The firm still owns and publishes the General Stud Book, recording the production of thoroughbred bloodstock in Britain and Ireland.

=== Weatherbys Bank ===
For the principal participants in the sport, Weatherbys offered accounting facilities and could hold their winnings to fund their future race entries. By the 1980s, the firm was effectively offering racehorse owners a current account alongside an option for short-term borrowing. Discussions with the Bank of England in 1994 resulted in Weatherbys acquiring a banking licence and the founding of their banking division.

For the first few years, Weatherbys Bank served its traditional client cohort – racehorse owners, breeders, trainers and a payroll office for jockeys. The banking licence enabled a full suite of financial offerings. Clients had chequebooks, debit cards, loans, term deposits and foreign exchange services.

In 1997, Arkle Asset Finance, a 100% subsidiary of Weatherbys Bank, was established to provide commercial asset finance services. By 2006, Weatherbys Bank split into Weatherbys Private Bank and Weatherbys Racing Bank. An office was opened in central London, and Weatherbys Private Bank was devised with wealth criteria applying, but the requirement for clients to have a Thoroughbred connection removed. Weatherbys Bank continued to provide services for those engaged in racing and breeding, with approximately 10,000 owners, trainers and jockeys on the books today. The majority of Weatherbys Private Bank's clients are now unconnected to racing.

=== Other businesses ===
Weatherbys print the Racing Calendar and racecourse racecards, as well as publications entirely divorced from racing and breeding. The company owns a genomic-testing facility for equine and agricultural stock.

In 2012, the insurance broking business Weatherbys Hamilton was constituted as a partnership with a number of partners providing brokerage services for bloodstock, property and liability insurance.

== Current operations ==
=== The Racing Division ===
Weatherbys Ltd is the founding company which today is primarily responsible for providing racing services to the British Horseracing Authority (BHA), along with racecard production, pedigree research, printing, publishing, marketing and ticketing services to a range of clients.

Weatherbys GSB Ltd is responsible for General Stud Book registrations, administration and publishing in Great Britain. 100% subsidiary of Weatherbys Ltd.

The Point-to-Point Racing Company Ltd provides publishing, administrative and editorial services to the sport of point-to-point (steeplechase) horse racing in Great Britain. In 2010, half of the business was bought by the Point-to-Point Authority and this shared ownership (Weatherbys/PPA) remains in place.

Weatherbys Ireland Ltd provides laboratory and other commercial services, largely to the Irish equine industry, as well as DNA and genomic testing services for agricultural stock.

Weatherbys Ireland GSB Ltd is responsible for General Stud Book registrations, administration and publishing in Ireland. 100% subsidiary of Weatherbys Ltd.

=== The Banking Division ===
Weatherbys Private Bank provides banking services and investment and wealth advice to private individuals. Authorised and regulated by the PRA and FCA, the bank has offices in London, Wellingborough and Edinburgh.

Weatherbys Racing Bank provides banking services to those engaged in horse racing. Authorised and regulated by the PRA and FCA, its employees are based at the Wellingborough HQ.

Arkle Finance Ltd Incorporated in 1997 to provide commercial asset finance services. 100% subsidiary of Weatherbys Bank.

Weatherbys Hamilton LLP was constituted as a partnership in 2012, drawing together 45% involvement from Weatherbys Bank Ltd and 50% from individual partners. Provides brokerage services for bloodstock, property and liability insurance. Offices in Wellingborough, London, Newmarket, Penrith and Swindon.

== See also ==
- Racing Calendar
- "Roger Weatherby: The Importance Of Relationship Banking In A Digital World" on YouTube
