= Benjamin Henshawe =

British merchant tailor

Benjamin Henshawe (1585–1631) was a London merchant tailor and silkman who supplied fabrics and passementerie for costume and furnishings for the royal court. His widow, Anna Henshawe, continued in business with William Geere.

== Background ==
Henshawe supplied the tailors working for Henrietta Maria and Jeffrey Hudson

He was a son of Thomas Henshawe (died 1611), silkman of Milk Street, London, and his wife, Flower Gouldesborough Henshawe, a sister of Godfrey Goldsborough, Bishop of Gloucester. His sister Flower Henshaw married John Backhouse in 1615. His mother, Flower Henshawe, died intestate in March 1616.

Thomas Henshawe sold lace, silk, ribbons, and fringes to Anne Sidney, the wife of William Fitzwilliam, in 1588. He supplied fabrics to Anne of Denmark. In 1606 he received payments for his bill of £4,967 from the Queen's vice-chamberlain, George Carew, and he supplied fabrics for The Masque of Beauty, The Masque of Queens, and Tethys' Festival. Thomas Henshawe was an "incorporator" of the East India Company in 1609.

Silkmen typically supervised weavers in-house, or used outworkers, who completed their products with silk supplied by the silkman. Nicholas Herman, a silkman based in Perth in the 1630s had a workshop with three silk trimming mills and five looms to make passementerie.

== Career ==
Like his father, Benjamin Henshawe supplied gold spangles, and spangled lace, for masques in 1613 at the wedding of Princess Elizabeth and Frederick V of the Palatinate. Spangles and oes were early types of sequin. He supplied "Venice gold twist" and "gold edging lace" to the embroiderer William Broderick, to make wall-hangings for the bridal chamber, silk ribbons to the upholsterer John Baker, and spangles to William Cookesbury who made plumes of feathers for the bed. The list of items supplied for the apparel of Elizabeth and her attendants includes "ten dozen of very rich gold and silver high sugar loaf buttons, wrought with pearl and oes". He delivered sewing silk for four ladies of the bedchamber, silver loop lace for eleven bridesmaid's gowns, and materials for the liveries of footmen and coachmen.

For the funeral of Anne of Denmark in 1619, Benjamin Henshawe provided gold fringes and trimmings for the velvet cushion on the hearse, on which an effigy of the queen was placed. Henshawe did not receive payment for goods supplied to Anne of Denmark worth £30,000 until May 1625. The historian Malcolm Smuts, noting that Henshawe supplied goods to the value of £45,000 to the king and queen between 1616 and 1618, wrote that his contribution to court culture had "been forgotten even by experts".

Fabrics for Anne of Denmark's clothes had been supplied by Baptist Hicks and William Stone (died 1607). Stone, Master of the Company of Clothworkers, was paid £6,108 by the queen's chamberlain George Carew in January 1605.

In 1620, Henshawe's servant Richard Jones billed Edward Herbert, 1st Baron Herbert of Cherbury for "greedaline" gold and silver lace, buttons, and loops for a night gown of "silver stuff" which Herbert intended to take to Paris. Henshaw worked with the upholsterer Ralph Grynder in the 1620s, making beds, couches, chairs, and cushions.

Henshawe was a member of the Honourable Artillery Company, and was known as "Captain Henshawe". He became a supplier of trimmings to Henrietta Maria and supplied lace to the tailors Gilbert Morrett and George Gillin who made clothes for the two dwarfs in her household, Jeffrey Hudson and Little Sara. After his death in 1631, his widow Anne or Anna Henshaw continued the business for a time, and received payment for an order for the masque Chloridia, which included copper lace for two "maskinge suttes for Jefferye".

Some editions of Geralds Meditations translated by Ralph Winterton include a dedication to Benjamin Henshaw and his brothers (1638), or to Henshaw and members of his wife's family, (1627).

== Wealth and corruption ==
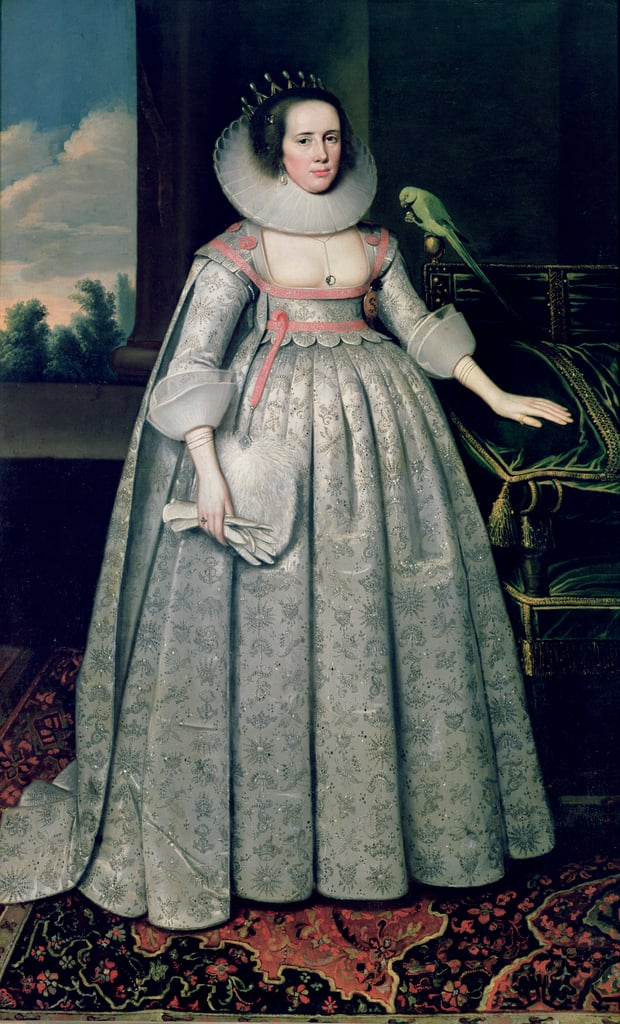
Katherine Knyvett, Countess of Suffolk by Paul van Somer

Henshawe was wealthy enough to donate windows for the chancel of St Mary Magdalen, Milk Street in 1619. Henshawe and another textile merchant Baptist Hicks were involved in a corruption court case brought against Thomas Howard, 1st Earl of Suffolk, due to a large sum of money owed to him by James VI and I. Henshawe's brother-in-law, Sir John Bingley (husband of Anne Henshaw, who died in 1615), was an exchequer official, and had brokered a series of transactions with Catherine Howard, Countess of Suffolk in 1617. A percentage of money owed to Henshawe for materials supplied to the royal wardrobe was diverted to the countess.

Henshawe and other suppliers including Oliver Browne were questioned on 26 April 1624 about goods supplied to the royal wardrobe under Lionel Cranfield, 1st Earl of Middlesex. Henshawe had bought the position of receiver of revenue from Dorset and Somerset crown lands from Cranfield in 1613 for £1000. As Cranfield became short of money he mortgaged manors to Henshawe.

== Anna Henshawe and William Geere ==
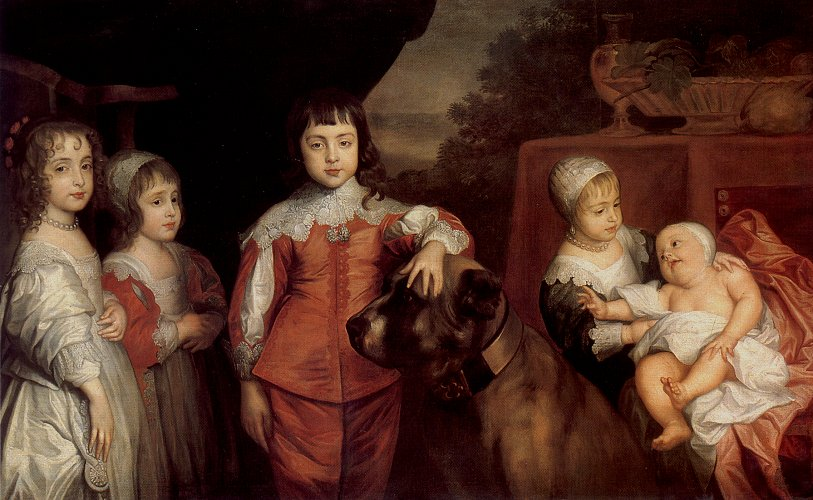
William Geere obtained Van Dyck's portrait The Five Children of Charles I

As the "executrix" of her husband, the widowed Anne Bonham Henshaw made payments to David Cunningham of Auchenharvie. The money was owed by her late husband as a receiver of royal income from Somerset. She continued to serve Henrietta Maria as a silkwoman. With William Geere, a London draper, she supplied "deep gold and silver French caulworke" fringes set with 100 silver roses to edge carnation velvet table carpets, chairs, and stools, completing a suite of furniture matching a bed. They also provided "fingerwork string" cords and tassels for the chapel at Somerset House. Geere and Anna Henshawe sold goods worth £1000 to Theophilus Howard, 2nd Earl of Suffolk.

Geere also worked for the Countess of Arundel at Tart Hall. He worked with Ralph Grynder to supply "flatt finger worke stringe" for the Queen's House at Greenwich. Geere, a warden of the Company of Drapers and an investor in the East India Company, was like Henshawe, a captain of the Artillery Company. Geere had attracted criticism in 1623 from the newly formed incorporation of the Gold Wire Drawers of the City of London for selling quantities of inferior products. He bought Lauderdale House at Highgate in 1632, and sold or mortgaged the property to Mary Sutton, Countess of Home, the mother-in-law of John Maitland, 1st Duke of Lauderdale. When the Earl of Lauderdale was declared "delinquent" in 1648, his furnishings in London were sold and Geere was made to repay £1,700 which he had from the Countess of Home. A delay to the sales was ignored. According to Bulstrode Whitelocke, officers from Haberdasher's Hall who came to collect Lauderdale's goods were resisted by a "file of musquetiers".

Anne Henshawe and William Geere were involved in the affairs of James, Earl of Suffolk in November 1648. He claimed that his father, Theophilus, Duke of Suffolk, had owed them £1,000 and made a bond for repayment. The bond had been transferred to Charles I and it was threatened that the Earl would have to sell lands to meet the debt.

Geere obtained significant furnishings and art works from the royal collection in 1650 in recompense of debts. Geere bought cloths of estate and Anthony van Dyck's portrait of The Five Children of Charles I. He died in 1654. Anna Henshawe petitioned to recover debts due to her, and an annuity sequestered by Parliament. She had one of her petitions printed in 1654, and was awarded £8,000 in December 1655.

== Family ==
The children of Benjamin and his wife Anna, daughter of the vintner William Bonham, included:

- Thomas Henshaw (1618–1700), alchemist
- Anne Henshawe (baptised 6 June 1619)
- Charles Henshaw (1630–1665), merchant and Consul to Genoa
- Nathaniel Henshaw (died 1673), physician
