= The Vision of the Twelve Goddesses =

Play written by Samuel Daniel

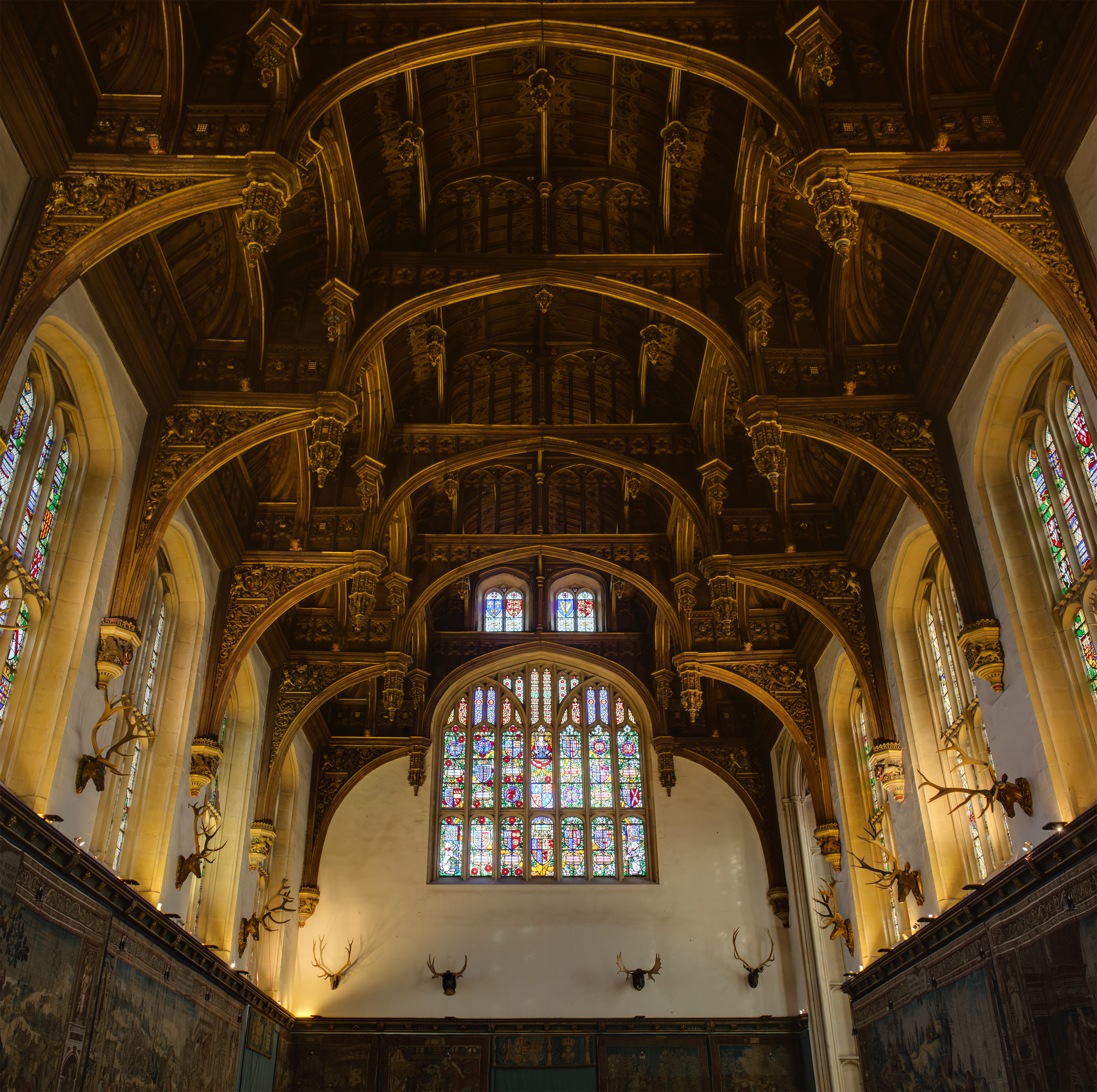
The ceiling of the Great Hall where the masque was performed

The Vision of the Twelve Goddesses was an early Jacobean-era masque, written by Samuel Daniel and performed in the Great Hall of Hampton Court Palace on the evening of Sunday, 8 January 1604. One of the earliest of the Stuart Court masques, staged when the new dynasty had been in power less than a year and was closely engaged in peace negotiations with Spain, The Vision of the Twelve Goddesses stood as a precedent and a pattern for the many masques that followed during the next four decades.

== Design and music ==
The name of the masque's designer is not recorded in the historical sources; some scholars have argued that he may have been Inigo Jones, who had recently returned to England from the royal court of Anne of Denmark's brother Christian IV, and so had a connection with her courtly establishment. The stage set had clear similarities with Jones's later masque work; the set for The Vision consisted of a large mountain, plus a Temple of Peace and a Cave of Sleep at the opposite end of the hall.

Thomas Edmondes wrote that Anne of Denmark's preparations for the new masque required the "use of invention" and the services of Hugh Sanford, who was to "direct the order and course for the Ladies [masque]". This may mean that Sanford directed the production, or perhaps coached the movement and choreography of the masquers. No payments to Sanford for this role have been found in the surviving records.

Anne of Denmark's privy purse accounts include payment to Alfonso Ferrabosco the younger, an Italian musician in the service of Prince Henry, for "making the songs". Another 29 musicians, not named, were paid for playing in the "rock" and "temple" and dancing. This was the second masque of the season, following The Masque of Indian and China Knights performed on 1 January 1604. On 6 January there was a masquerade performed by Scottish courtiers in the Queen's presence involving a sword dance, said to be comparable to a Spanish "matachin". There was also an equestrian show of running at the ring, in "honour of those goddesses", for which a "standing" or grandstand was built for Anne of Denmark.

== The show ==
Daniel's text draws on classical mythology. The presenters are Iris, the Graces, a Sybil, and personifications of Night and Sleep. (These speaking roles were taken by boys and men who were not aristocrats but lower Court functionaries. Aristocratic participants in Court masques generally did not take speaking roles.) The musicians who played cornets were dressed as satyrs.

In the masque, Night appears and awakens her son, Sleep, who calls forth a vision for the spectators with his wand (and promptly goes back to sleep). Iris appears at the top of the artificial mountain, and descends to the Temple of Peace, where she tells the Sybil about the coming of the goddesses. The Graces appear on the mountaintop and descend to the floor below, followed by twelve goddesses, descending three by three, to the music of the satyrs. Each goddess is followed by a torchbearer, dressed in white with gold stars. The dozen aristocrats parade to the Temple of Peace as the Graces sing; the main dances ensue.

Among allusions to the recent Union of Crowns of England and Scotland, Venus gave Anne of Denmark an "all combining scarf of Amity". The Scottish lady in waiting, Margaret Stewart, Countess of Nottingham, played Concordia, dressed in national red and white colours, embroidered with a device of clasped hands, presented part-colours roses at the Temple of Peace. Tethys was described as the ocean goddess who encircles the dominion.

== Cast ==
The performance featured Anne of Denmark, the queen consort of King James I, and eleven of the queen's ladies in waiting. They were attired as classical goddesses and danced in the masque; the Queen, curiously, did not take the obvious role of Juno, queen of the gods, but rather Pallas Athena. The dozen noble participants and their roles were:

- Queen Anne ................. Pallas
- Countess of Suffolk ........ Juno
- C. of Hertford ................ Diana
- C. of Bedford ............... Vesta
- C. of Derby ............ Proserpine
- C. of Nottingham ..... Concordia
- Lady Rich ..................... Venus
- Lady Hatton ................ Macaria
- Lady Walsingham ........ Astraea
- Susan Vere ..................... Flora
- Dorothy Hastings ............ Ceres
- Elizabeth Howard .......... Tethys

== Costumes and suppliers ==
The ladies' costumes were sumptuous: "Juno" wore a "sky-colored mantle" embroidered with gold and peacock feathers, with a crown also of gold; "Diana" was dressed a "green mantle" embroidered with silver half moons, "with a croissant of pearls on her head." The costumes were created by ransacking the wardrobe of the dead Queen Elizabeth. Arbella Stuart reported that Anne of Denmark sent Audrey Walsingham and Lady Suffolk to choose fabrics. According to Dudley Carleton the old gowns supplied embroidered satins, cloth of silver, and cloth of gold for the goddesses. Elizabeth I had allowed the use of some of the clothes of Mary I of England in court drama, but there are very few other records of the re-use and recycling of clothes and masque costume at court in the 17th-century.

Anne of Denmark also spent at least £1000 on new fabrics for the masque. She wore a blue mantle with silver embroidery depicting cannon and weapons of war. Dudley Carleton described Anne's costume as Pallas, "her clothes were not so much below the knee but that we might see a woman had both feet and legs which I never knew before. She had a pair of buskins sett with rich stones, a helmett full of jewells, and her whole attire [helmet] embossed with jewells of severall fashions".

William Cookesbury supplied feathers for the masque costumes to Audrey Walsingham and Elizabeth Carey. Accounts for the masque show that Mary Mountjoy (Shakespeare's landlady) provided a helmet for the queen; James Duncan, tailor, made the queen's costume; Mrs Rogers made "tires" or headdresses; Christopher Shawe was the embroiderer; Thomas Kendall provided costumes for the professionals; Richard French, haberdasher, provided cloth for the goddess's mantles; Thomas Wilson made the queen's shoes and buskins; Edward Ferres, draper; George Hearne was the painter; William Portington was carpenter and made the temple and rock; Robert Payne was in charge of some of the professional actors; Audrey Walsingham and Elizabeth Carey signed wardrobe acquisitions; John Kirkton was orderer and director of the works (financial director).

The masque cost between two and three thousand pounds to stage. Lady Penelope Rich reportedly wore £20,000 worth of jewels while appearing the masque – though she was outdone by the Queen, who sported fully £100,000 in gems. (This kind of extreme display became characteristic of the courtly masques during the Stuart era, and was a focus of controversy and deep disapproval by wide segments of the public.)

The courtier Roger Wilbraham wrote a summary of his impressions of the entertainments at court in January 1604 and their costs, "King James was at his court at Hampton, where the French, Spanish, and Polonian ambassadors were severallie solemplie feasted, many plaies & daunces with swordes, one mask by English & Scottish lords, another by the Queen's Maiestie & eleven more ladies of her chamber presenting giftes as goddesses. These maskes, especially the laste, costes £2000 or £3000, the aparells, rare musick, fine songes, and in jewels most riche £20,000, the least to my judgment, & [jewels for] her Majestie £100,000, after Christmas was running at the ring by the King & 8 or 9 lords for the honour of those goddesses & then they all feasted together privatelie."

== Diplomacy ==
Attendance at the masque was highly coveted, and grew to be a bone of contention among the Court's foreign ambassadors – another element that would become typical of future masques. The competition was so intense that the French ambassador, Christophe de Harlay, Count of Beaumont, actually threatened to kill his Spanish counterpart Juan de Tassis, 1st Count of Villamediana in the King's presence if he wasn't invited. The French ambassador was invited instead to a Scottish masquerade or sword dance and a play in the Queen's presence, and court protocol deemed it appropriate that the Spanish ambassador attend the Queen's masque in the absence of his French counterpart. At the masque Villamediana was "taken out" to dance by Lucy, Countess of Bedford, and Susan de Vere danced with Polish ambassador, Stanislaus Cikowski de Voislanice. Villamediana sent a script of the masque to Philip III.

== Publication ==
Daniel's text for the masque was published in a 1604 quarto by the bookseller Edward Allde. This was an unauthorised and defective printing; Daniel countered it with an authorised and accurate octavo edition in the same year, issued by the stationer Simon Waterson. That edition bears Daniel's dedication of the work to his patroness Lucy Russell, Countess of Bedford, who had recommended him to Queen Anne for the commission; the dedication, at 210 lines, is the longest in English Renaissance drama. The text was reprinted in quarto in 1623.

== Aftermath ==
Daniel did well from the masque; he was made, firstly, a Groom of the Queen's Chamber and later a chamberlain; and the Queen gave him the job of licensing plays for the Children of the Chapel, the troupe of child actors that Anne had just taken into her patronage as the Children of the Queen's Revels. His ascendancy was brief, however: later in 1604 Daniel got into trouble with the Privy Council over a performance of his play Philotas, which was seen as a too-friendly commentary on the Essex rebellion of 1601. Daniel bowed out of further masque-writing for the Court – though commentators wonder how voluntary his action was. Ben Jonson quickly took over as the principal (though not the sole) masque writer for the Stuarts. Daniel did make one more venture in masquing prior to his 1619 death; he composed Tethys' Festival for its summer 1610 performance.

== Sources ==
- Ungerer, Gustav. "Juan Pantoja de la Cruz and the Circulation of Gifts Between the English and Spanish Courts in 1604/5", in Shakespeare Studies, John Leeds Barroll, ed.; Fairleigh Dickinson University Press, 1998. ISBN 0-8386-3782-5.
- Bergeron, David Moore. Textual Patronage in English Drama, 1570–1640. London, Ashgate, 2006.
- Chambers, E. K. The Elizabethan Stage. 4 Volumes, Oxford, Clarendon Press, 1923.
- Daniel, Samuel. The Vision of the Twelve Goddesses. Edited and with an Introduction by Ernest Law. London, Bernard Quaritch, 1880
- Cano-Echevarria, Berta & Mark Hutchings, 'The Spanish Ambassador and Samuel Daniel's Vision of the Twelve Goddesses: A New Document [with Text]', English Literary Renaissance, 42:2 (Spring 2012) pp. 223–257. doi:10.1111/j.1475-6757.2012.01105.x
