= Christopher Shawe =

English embroiderer and textile artist

Christopher Shawe or Shaw (died 1618) was an English embroiderer and textile artist who worked on masque costume for Anne of Denmark. He was a member of the Worshipful Company of Broderers.

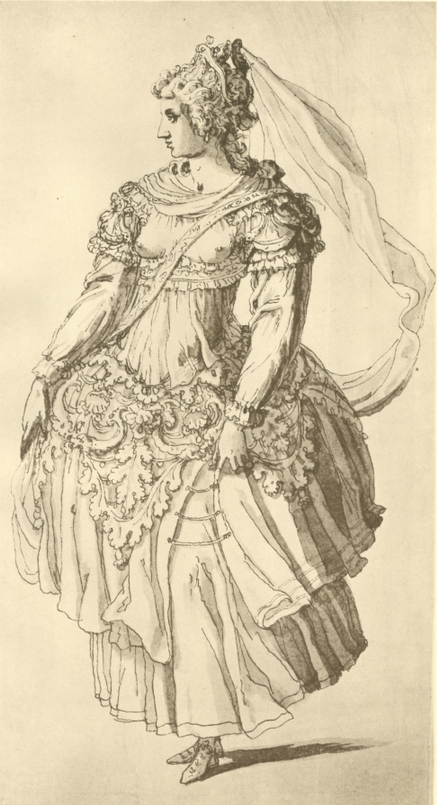
Christopher Shawe realised the costume designs of Inigo Jones

== Career ==
In September 1589, Shawe married Isobel Buttes, originally from Streatham, at St Benet's, Paul's Wharf, the church used by the College of Arms.

Shawe worked on masque costume in December 1603 for the female dancers in The Vision of the Twelve Goddesses, and presumably other masques of the season. Some of the costume was recycled from the wardrobe of Elizabeth I. He also worked on other "parcels" (orders) of embroidery for Anne of Denmark supplied to Audrey Walsingham.

"Master Shawe" was paid £106-7s for work on costumes for The Masque of Beauty in January 1608. He worked on costumes for the masque Tethys' Festival in 1610 and his bill detailing his work survives. He embroidered cobweb silver lawn with veins of silver and sea green silk, sewed motifs with silver and gold oes, and embroidered a pair of sea green satin dancing shoes. At least one of the costumes he worked on features in an inventory of Anne of Denmark's wardrobe.

His bill of 5 June 1610 included:

Item, for inbrathring vij [7] yards of Copwede lane [cobweb lane] withe vaines of scilver and segrene and scilver oose and Carn[a]tion scilke, for working scilver and scilke vij. li [£7]
Item, for inbrawthering xxviij yards of tiffenne vere riche with oose goold, for working, scilke and goold oose xviij. li. [£18]
Item, for inbrawthering a peare of shues of segrene satten [sea green satin] vere riche, for workeng, goold and scilke iij. li. [£3]

The costume and shoes were for Anne of Denmark herself, who played the Titan sea goddess Tethys with her ladies as rivers personified. A drawing by Inigo Jones of a costume for Tethys or a nymph with "shoes of satin, richly imbrodered" survives.

The seven yards of embroidered cobweb lawn were probably for the queen's veil. Cobweb lawn and net lawn were fine linens suitable for veils. Male performers in Jonson's Masque of Hymen wore crowns with veils of carnation and silver net lawn. Anne of Denmark owned a number of mantles, made of the lightweight fabrics tiffany, tinsel, and cobweb lawn.

During the masque Tethys gave Prince Henry an embroidered scarf, figuratively or literally representing Britain, a "zone of love and amity". It is not clear if Shawe embroidered this prop, and some 19th-century writers including Agnes Strickland, Charlotte Mary Yonge, and Robert Folkestone Williams assumed that Anne of Denmark had made it herself.

Shawe was not paid in full and petitioned for payment for work on the masque and other embroidery for the queen.

Shawe died on 31 July 1618 and was buried at St Margaret's Chipstead, where an inscription records him as a Citizen of London and "Imbrodorer".

The names of other court embroiderers of this period are known, including James Freeland, the queen's embroiderer, Edmund Palmer, described as embroiderer to the queen and Prince Henry, and John Parr (died 1607), John Shepley, and William Broderick (died 1620), were embroiderers to King James. They employed numbers of workmen. Ribbons and passementerie were provided by silkmen, including Benjamin Henshawe.

== Charitable bequests ==
By his will of 5 October 1617 he bequeathed an annuity of 20 shillings from his Chipstead property, Sturrock Crofts, and his tenement in London, the Barge in St Benets, administered by the London Embroiderer's Company, to be given in bread to the poor of the parish of Chipstead, and £3 to the schoolmaster at Market Harborough. He left 20 shillings yearly for the churchwardens of St Benets to give to the poor on 5 November in memory of the discovery of the Gunpowder Plot.

== Family and Christopher Shawe junior ==
He had two daughters and three sons, including Christopher Shawe, younger, who worked with him as an embroiderer for Anne of Denmark and had a house in St Benets at "Audlyn Hill", now Addle Hill. The king's embroiderer William Brotherick lived next door, conveniently sited for the royal Great Wardrobe. The younger Shawe's widow and executrix, Margaret Shawe, petitioned William Juxon and other officials for payment of £439-12s after his death. She mentioned that she had three young children at the time of Christopher Shawe's death. The petitions refer to him as Christopher Shawe, younger, servant of Anne of Denmark. While adjudicating a similar petition, Juxon consulted Zachary Bethell's account book of "Queen Anne's Robes".
