= The Masque of Indian and China Knights =

1604 court performance in Richmond, England

The Masque of Indian and China Knights was performed at Hampton Court in Richmond, England on 1 January 1604. The masque was not published, and no text survives. It was described in a letter written by Dudley Carleton. The historian Leeds Barroll prefers the title, Masque of the Orient Knights.

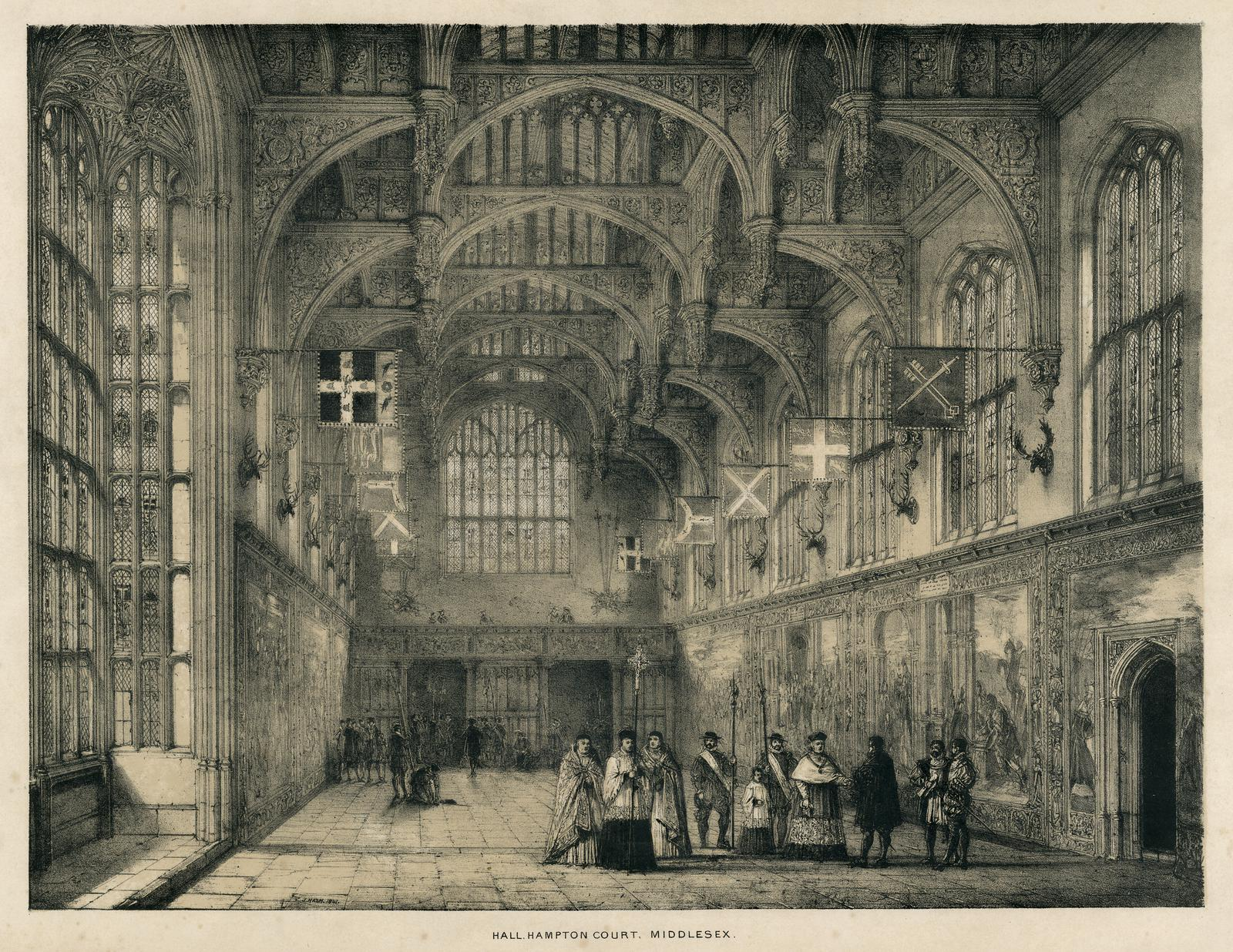
Eight courtiers masqueraded as Indian and Chinese knights in Great Hall of Hampton Court on New Year's day 1604

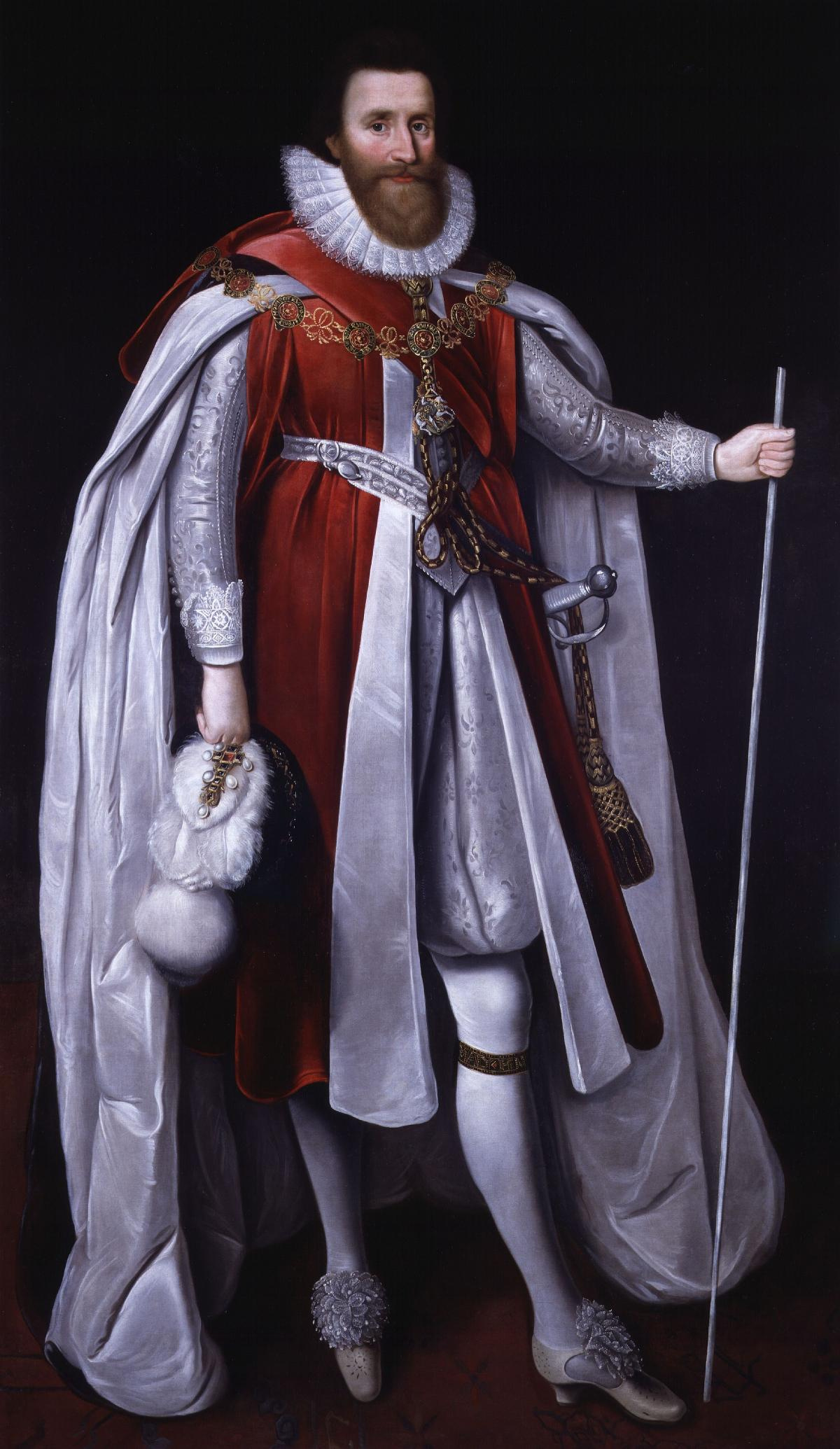
The Masque of Knights was produced by Ludovic Stewart, 2nd Duke of Lennox

== Background ==
This masque marked the return of the royal households to London after an outbreak of plague. The households of Anne of Denmark and Prince Henry had travelled to Winchester, and entertained themselves in October with the masque, Prince Henry's Welcome at Winchester. The French ambassador, Christophe de Harlay, Count of Beaumont, heard that Anne of Denmark was planning more superior and costly events for Christmas time, to be realised as this masque and The Vision of the Twelve Goddesses. There was also an equestrian show of running at the ring, and a special "standing" was built for Anne of Denmark to use as a grandstand.

=== Merry gentlemen ===
A letter written by Arbella Stuart appears to identify the Masque of Knights and another masque as the invention of a group of male courtiers rather than the queen's personal production, writing on 18 December 1603 that she was their confidante, "Certain noblemen (whom I may not yet name to you because some of them have made me of their counsel) intend another. Certain gentlemen of a good sort another". On 21 December Dudley Carleton wrote that the Duke of Lennox was the deviser or producer of the masques to be performed by men, "We shall have a merry Christmas at Hampton Court, for both male and female masques are all ready bespoken, whereof the Duke is rector chori of the one side, and the Lady Bedford of the other".

The French ambassador, Christophe de Harlay, Count of Beaumont, and the Spanish ambassador Juan de Tassis, 1st Count of Villamediana competed for precedence at court. Beaumont was invited to Lennox's masque and Villamediana was invited to the more prestigious twelfth night masque, The Vision of the Twelve Goddesses. Beaumont took this as a slight, but was compelled to attend the gentleman's masque or sword dance. The controversy delayed the production of The Vision of the Twelve Goddesses.

=== Travellers from afar ===
The general theme of the masque is a visit of knights from distant lands to the new Stuart court in England. Their foreigness may have been intended to put into perspective differences between Scottish and English courtiers. The representation of a Chinese magician in the masque can be seen as an example of cultural appropriation, while the imagined country he describes seems, from Carleton's report, to be a kind of fictionalised Utopia.

English court masques had previously featured arrivals, in January 1512 twelve masquers in disguise, "after the manner of Italy", and in January 1527 Henry VIII and courtier shepherds arrived at Hampton Court. Precedents can also be found in the records of the Scottish court. Shepherds arrived at Castle Campbell for a wedding masque in January 1563. The Navigatioun by Alexander Montgomerie was probably performed in the Christmas season 1579/80. This masque involved the torchlit entrance at Holyrood Palace of a narrator and his three companions, a "Turk, the More, and the Egyptien". The court musicians were bought "mask claithis" comprising red and yellow taffeta with swords and daggers. Montgomerie's prologue alludes to the Magi and Epiphany to represent James VI as the Northern Star. James was also characterised as Solomon. The masque was followed by dancing. The king's favourite, Esmé Stewart, 1st Duke of Lennox may have been involved in this entertainment; the narrator describes himself as "german born", meaning he is a cousin.

At the masque celebrating the baptism of James VI in 1566, Indian nereids had used compasses to navigate their way to Stirling Castle following the Great Bear from the New World. The Indian knights at Hampton Court may have represented Indigenous peoples of the Americas. During the inaugural Entry of Anne of Denmark into Edinburgh in May 1590, actors portrayed the "Moirs of Ind", who dwelt in harmony and abundance by "Synerdas", and had sailed to Scotland to offer her the wise counsel of their "most willing minds".

=== Role of the Duke of Lennox ===
The performance at Hampton Court may have been influenced by French practice, the ambassador the Comte de Beaumont said Lennox's ballet was organised à la Française and the Earl of Worcester described another of the January masques as a "ballet" rather a masque. Beaumont also mentions a third masque, a ballet d'Écossais, the Scottish masque. Carleton says this was a masquerade on 6 January by "Scotchmen" in the Queen's presence involving a sword dance comparable to a Spanish matachin. There are some similarities in Carleton's description of the Masque of Knights with the Ballet des Princes de la Chine performed at the French court in 1601. One of the 1604 masquers, Lord Aubigny, younger brother of Lennox, may have attended this ballet in person.

David Bergeron notes in connection with the Masque of Knights that the Duke of Lennox had previously helped to plan the reception of Anne of Denmark in May 1590 and the masque at the baptism of Prince Henry at Stirling Castle in 1594, and mentions that Lord Aubigny hosted Ben Jonson from 1604 onwards.

== The show ==
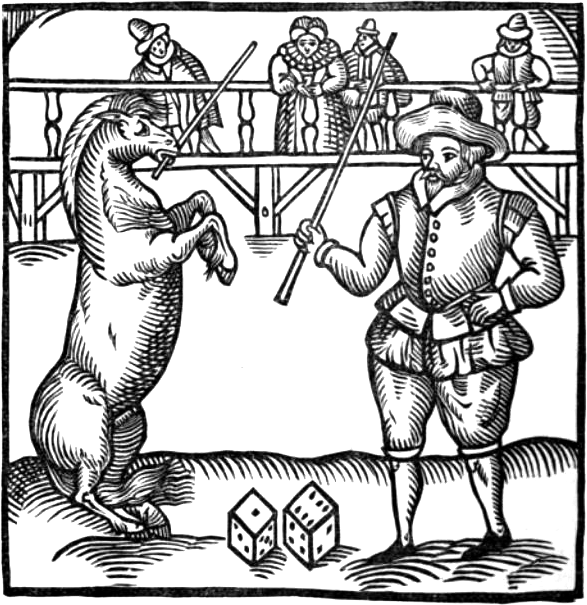
King James reminded the audience of a famous performing horse, Marocco

According to the report of Dudley Carleton, the masque was staged at night after a performance of a Robin Goodfellow play, probably A Midsummer Night's Dream. The scene opened with Heaven, built in the hall, from where a Chinese magician made a long speech describing his country, comparing it "for strength and plenty" with England. He announced the arrival of "certain Indian and China knights", whom he had magically conveyed on clouds to Hampton Court. A curtain or "traverse" was pulled back to reveal the masquers playing the knights and carrying torches and lanterns. After some songs, the masquers approached the king in turn.

William Herbert, Earl of Pembroke, presented James VI and I with a shield bearing an impresa or poem, which he explained. He gave the king an expensive jewel. Dudley Carleton wrote that King James was planning to buy this jewel from the financier Peter Vanlore. The jewel cost "a great sum of money", although the price mentioned by Carleton, £40,000, seems far too high. The jewel was perhaps a diamond with a pendant pearl delivered with a ruby ring to the king on 1 January, which cost £760. Soon after King James obtained a large table ruby and two lozenge diamonds, for which he sent Vanlore a parcel of Queen Elizabeth's jewels worth £5492–11s–2d in part-payment.

The other masquers presented shields with emblems. Philip Herbert's shield depicted a horse in a green field, which he explained was descendent of Alexander's Bucephalus. The king made a joke about a showman called Bankes whose act involved a dancing and calculating horse, and then on cue, the formal dance of the masque took place. Next, Anne of Denmark and her ladies in waiting joined in the dancing, "taken out" of the audience by the masquers. Carleton mentions the Countess of Bedford, the Countess of Hertford, Susan Vere, Penelope Rich, and Lady Southwell the elder. The event ended with the return of the magician who dissolved the entertainment by revealing the identities of the eight masqued English and Scottish courtiers.

Some surviving music was copied by Nicholas Le Strange from the January 1604 masques at Hampton Court. William Bankes and his famous horse had visited Edinburgh in April 1596.

The courtier Roger Wilbraham wrote a summary of his impressions of the entertainments at court in January 1604 and their costs;

King James was at his court at Hampton, where the French, Spanish, and Polonian ambassadors were severallie solemplie feasted, many plaies & daunces with swordes, one mask by English & Scottish lords, another by the Queen's Maiestie & eleven more ladies of her chamber presenting giftes as goddesses. These maskes, especially the laste, costes £2000 or £3000, the aparells, rare musick, fine songes, and in jewels most riche £20,000, the least to my judgment, & [jewels for] her Majestie £100,000, after Christmas was running at the ring by the King & 8 or 9 lords for the honour of those goddesses & then they all feasted together privatelie."

== The masquers ==
The eight courtiers wore robes of crimson satin embroidered with gold and dressed with silver lace over silver doublets, with swords and hats with an Indian bird feather. These costumes, according to Dudley Carleton, were too cumbersome for dancing. They were four English and four Scottish courtiers, possibly representing the themes of political union:

- Thomas Somerset
- Henry Goodere or Goodyer
- William Herbert
- Philip Herbert
- Ludovic Stewart, 2nd Duke of Lennox
- Esmé Stewart, Lord Aubigny
- James Hay
- Richard Preston
