= Oes =

Decorative metallic rings in textiles

Oes or owes were metallic O-shaped rings or eyelets sewn on to clothes and furnishing textiles for decorative effect. Made of gold, silver, or copper, they were used on clothing and furnishing fabrics and were smaller than modern sequins. They were made either from rings of wire or punched out of a sheet of metal.

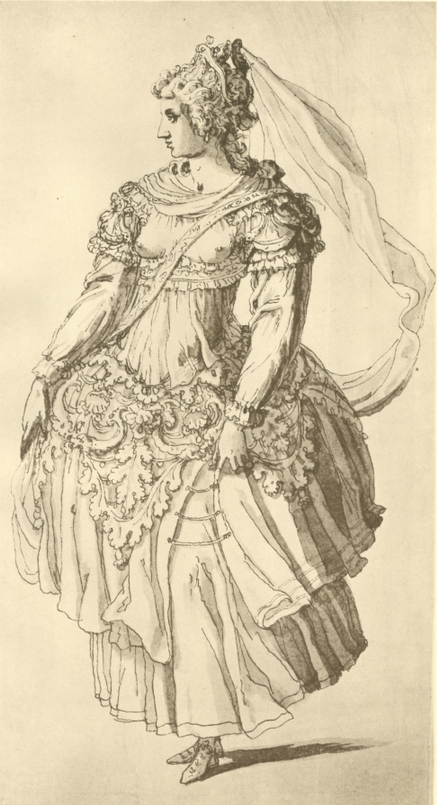
Christopher Shaw stitched silver "oes" on costumes designed by Inigo Jones

== Making and metals ==
Robert Sharp obtained a patent to make gold oes and spangles (another early variety of sequin) in 1575. They were also made from silver and copper. Oes were made either from rings of wire wound around a dowel, or by punching flat rings out of a sheet of metal.

Goldsmiths including Cornelis Hayes made spangles for the court. Spangles or "spangs" were mentioned in connection with head dresses worn by the maids of honour, set on wires and known as "hanging spangles". In 1596, the embroiderer John Parr sewed spangles on the bodice and sleeves of gowns, and set "hanging spangles" on the stomachers. Garments, especially the foreparts of skirts, were listed in Elizabeth's inventories decorated with both spangles and oes, and there may not always have been a clear distinction.

Policy makers worried about the supply of precious metal bullion and restricted the making of gold and silver oes and similar products by patent to the Company of Wire Drawers. In July 1624, their manufacture was forbidden for a time.

=== Fraud ===
Some London hat band makers were prosecuted and fined in 1631 for the fraud of using gilt copper oes and claiming their wares employed only gold oes and thread. Imitation silver or gold oes sold openly were called "counterfeit oes" or "Alchemy oes", and appear as "Olcamee oes" in the 1643 inventory of a Worcestershire mercer Thomas Cowcher. Thomas Knyvett sent his wife and Aunt Bell 12 ounces of counterfeit oes and oes of "right silver" in paper wraps in 1623. He offered to buy oes of a different size if required. There were three kinds of oes available. A paper of oes contained 40 oes weighing 2 ounces.

== Use ==
Oes were used to decorate hairnets called "crespines" or "crippins", an item of clothing worn by women of the Tudor court and Elizabeth I. Some of her doublets were decorated with "squares of silver owes". An inventory of 1626 mentions a white satin crippin embroidered with gold oes and a green satin crippin with silver oes. As a New Year Day's gift in January 1600, Dorothy Speckard and her husband gave Queen Elizabeth a head veil of striped network, flourished with carnation silk and embroidered with oes.

Norwich tailor Edmund Peckover, in his very long and detailed 1592 bill to Nathaniel Bacon of Stiffkey, Norfolk, charged xjs iijd (11 shillings and 3 pence) for an ounce and a half of oes to decorate three ladies' gowns and/or stomachers; 5 shillings and 6 pence for three-quarters of an ounce of silver oes for a ladies gown; and eight shillings for an ounce of silver oes for another gown. Gold or gold-coloured oes were 7 shilling and sixpence the ounce.

Edmund Palmer embroidered a purple satin suit for Prince Henry with silk thread, silver thread, and silver oes. Oes were stitched by embroiderers to form patterns. The Earl of Northampton owned a sweet bag embroidered with knots of silver oes and burning hearts.

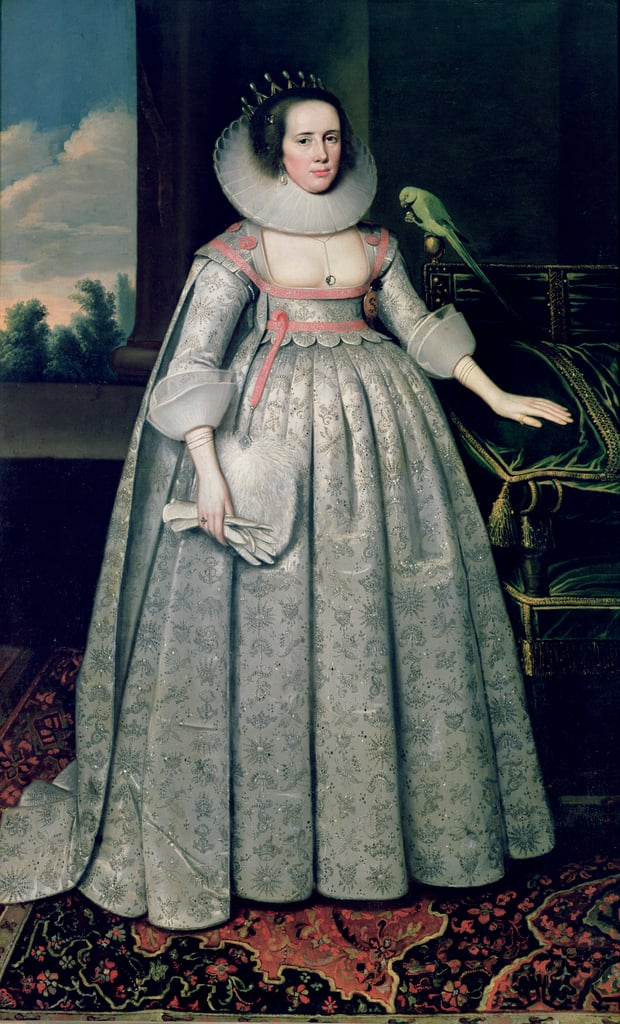
Katherine Knyvett, Countess of Suffolk by Paul van Somer

An inventory of the clothes of Anne of Denmark includes a gown and bodice embroidered with "silver purl plate and oes". A portrait of Catherine Howard, Countess of Suffolk by Paul van Somer shows her dressed in a silver satin gown embroidered with emblems and insects using spangles or oes. It has been suggested the embroidered motifs depicted in the painting derive from Henry Peacham's Minerva Brittana.

Oes were used in masque costume. In 1610 the embroiderer Christopher Shawe worked on the skirts for the dancers in the masque Tethys' Festival, sewing on silver "oes", and embroidering gold "oes" on tiffany fabric. The grass-green and sea-green costumes made for this masque and Love Freed from Ignorance and Folly match the advice of Francis Bacon, who wrote "colours that show best by candlelight are white, carnation, and a kind of sea-water green; and oes and spangs as they are of no great cost, so they are of most glory". Bacon was probably writing from his own experience, after funding The Masque of Flowers.

In February 1613, the character of Honor in Chapman's The Memorable Masque of the Middle Temple and Lincoln's Inn wore a "vaile of net lawne, embrodered with Oos and Spangl'd". In literature, oes and spangles could be associated with vain luxury and the glittering stars of the night sky. Henry Hawkins wrote of the sky "beset with siluer-oes" and the stars as "siluer Oes, al powdred heer and there, or spangles sprinckled ouer the purple Mantle or night-gowne of the heauens".

Purchases of oes are recorded in the household book of Lord William Howard of Naworth Castle. He ordered silver and gold oes from London in 1620 for Mistress Marie, copper oes for his children's clothes in 1621, and gold oes in March 1634 for the tailor making clothes for his wife Elizabeth Dacre.

Used on furnishing fabrics, oes sometimes appear in inventories. At Westmorland House in London in the 1620s, a London home of Francis Fane, 1st Earl of Westmorland and Mary Mildmay Fane, Countess of Westmorland, there was a couch in the best withdrawing room set in a canopy with curtains, embellished with embroidered slips and gold oes. A couch beonging to the Countess of Home at Twickenham Park in 1624 had a secondary covering of blue and white tufted taffeta set with silver oes. Old inventories describe "oes" decorating the surviving "Spangled bed" at Knole.

In French, the equivalents of spangles and oes were known as paillettes or papillottes. Mary, Queen of Scots, had gold and silver papillottes for her masques costumes as a girl in France. She requested silver papillottes for her embroidery from the diplomat Mothe Fénélon in 1574, as delicate and beautiful as he could find. 18th-century furnishing bills include references to functional "oes", round eyelets used to guide curtain cords.
