= James Duncan (tailor) =

Scottish tailor and landowner

James Duncan of Ratho (died 1639) was a Scottish tailor and landowner who worked for Anne of Denmark in England.

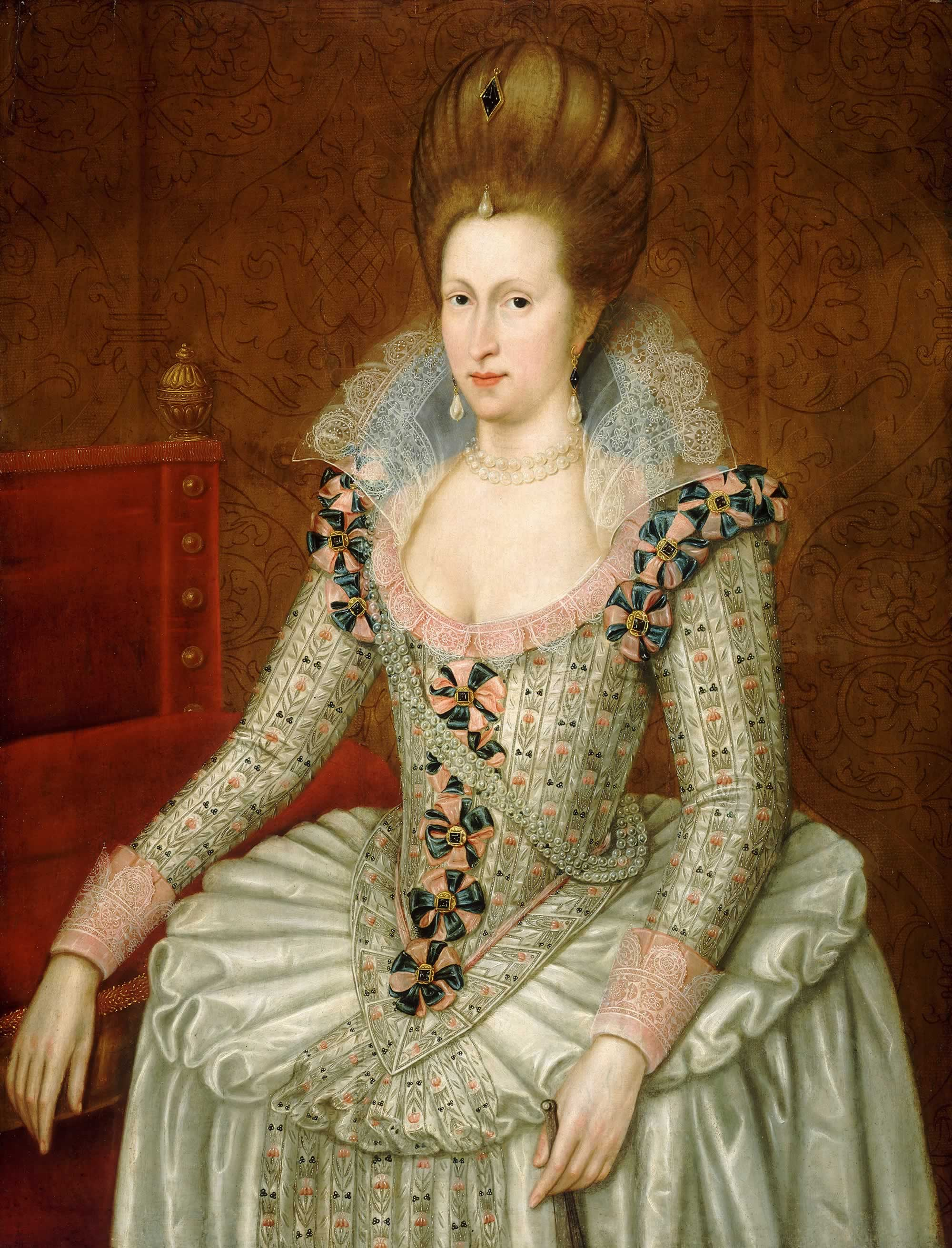
James Duncan supplied clothes and costumes for masques to Anne of Denmark

== Costume ==
Duncan had family connections at Colpy near Culsalmond in Aberdeenshire, in the lands of Henrietta Stewart, a favourite of Anne of Denmark, and her husband George Gordon, 1st Marquess of Huntly, and at the Mote of Errol and Gourdiehill in Perthshire.

After the Union of the Crowns in 1603, Duncan came to England and was appointed a yeoman of the robes and master tailor to Anne of Denmark, the wife of James VI and I. An account made by a member of Princess Elizabeth's household, Anne Livingstone, or by the Princess herself, records payments to "James Duncan's man" for carrying gowns from Winchester and Salisbury to Nonsuch and Oatlands.

As well as working on the queen's clothes, her robes and "bodies", Duncan supplied costume for her masques, including The Vision of the Twelve Goddesses in January 1604. His work for the masque may have involved selecting garments from the wardrobe of Elizabeth I with the Countess of Suffolk and Audrey Walsingham to be cut up and recycled.

Duncan received £5 yearly as a fee as a yeoman of the wardrobe, and £36 as the master tailor by letters patent. In July 1614 he was given an allowance for livery for life. He was also paid for work and materials supplied to the queen.

His English will was proved in June 1639, giving his London residence as the parish of St Ann Blackfriars. His wife was Ellen Duncan, and they had three daughters, Isobel, Sara, and Lucie. His kinswoman Christian Kalehoose lived with them.

== Landowner ==
Duncan bought land and houses around Edinburgh and in East Lothian. He acquired lands in Monktonhall in 1612 and a servant of another court tailor, Alexander Miller, was a witness to the transaction. He bought the estate of Bonnington and Hillhousefield (in Pilrig and North Leith) from Sir Lewis Craig in 1621. He also acquired lands in Ratho from Thomas Otterburn of Redhall and John Marjoribanks, and was known as "James Duncan of Ratho". His house at Ratho, the Place of Ratho, was called "Marjoribanks", a name and surname supposedly derived from a grant of the Ratho lands to Marjorie Bruce, a daughter of Robert the Bruce.

James Duncan placed his properties in the hands of his heirs, his cousins, James Duncan (died 1641), a son of Gilbert Duncan in "Colpnay" near Culsalmond, and Robert Duncan, a son of Peter Duncan in Gourdhill. Duncan had already transferred his property in Monktonhall, which was within the dower lands of Anne of Denmark in Musselburgh, to his cousin James Duncan in 1620. This James Duncan became the second "James Duncan of Ratho". His son, the third James Duncan of Ratho (died 1646), married Isabella Foulis. They had a daughter, Elizabeth Duncan. Following his death, Isabella, Lady Ratho, married Major William Murray at Ratho in 1648.
