= Tethys' Festival =

17th century English Masque

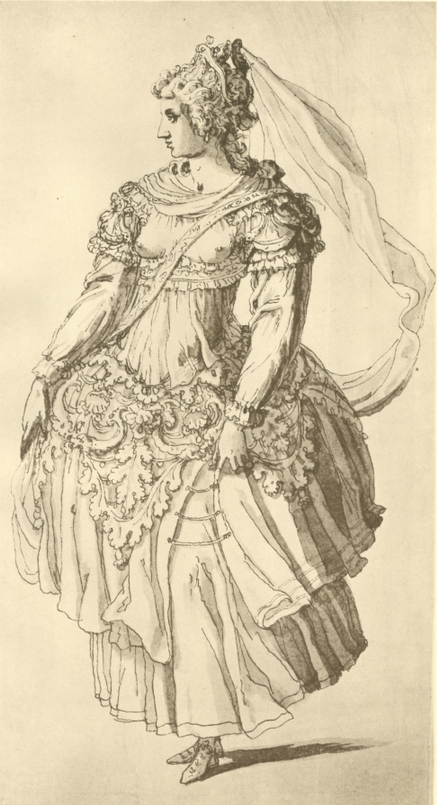
Inigo Jones costume for a nymph in Tethys' Festival

Tethys' Festival was a masque produced on 5 June 1610 to celebrate the investiture of Prince Henry (1594–1612) as Prince of Wales.

Prince Henry, the son of James VI and I and Anne of Denmark, was made Prince of Wales in June 1610. Among the formalities and festivities of the occasion, the masque Tethys' Festival was performed by courtiers at Whitehall Palace. The script was written by Samuel Daniel at the request of the queen, who appeared in person as Tethys, a goddess of the sea. Inigo Jones designed the staging and scenery. A narrative of the masque was printed and a courtier also wrote a description of the event. The City of London had staged their pageant London's Love to Prince Henry on the Thames on 31 May.

During the performance Anne of Denmark gave Prince Henry an engraved sword, which may be the jewelled sword surviving in the Wallace Collection. The sword, set with diamonds, was supplied by the goldsmiths George Heriot and John Spilman, and described in inventories of the prince's jewels.

== Summary ==
The stage was set with a representation of Milford Haven, a Welsh port, with boats bobbing in the harbour, framed by giant statues of Neptune and Nereus. The setting evoked Henry's Tudor ancestry, as Henry VII had landed at Milford Haven. Perhaps as an heir to a Tudor Arthurian tradition, during the masque Henry was to be presented with a sword by his mother.

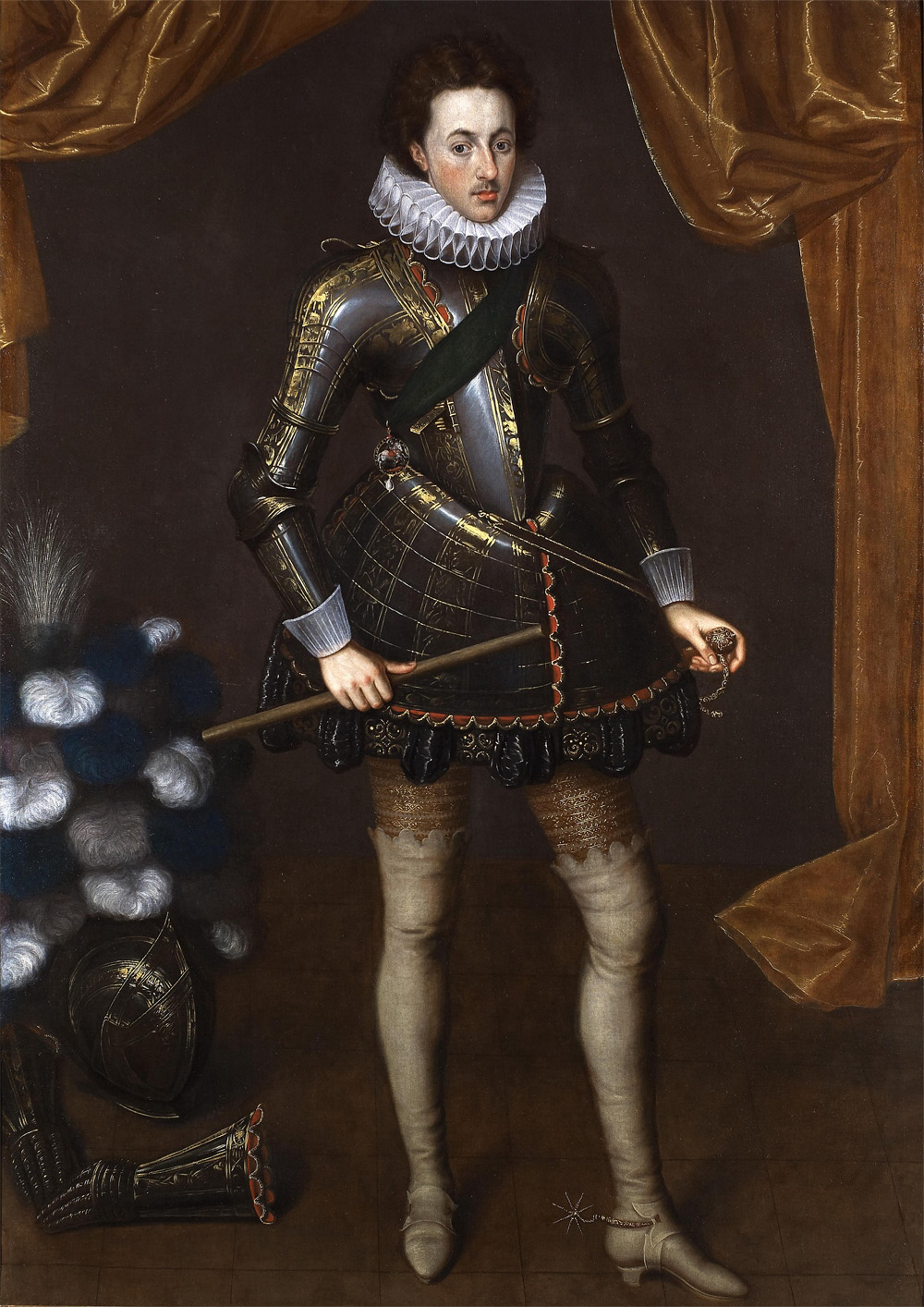
Prince Henry by Robert Peake

First Prince Charles took the part of "Zephyrus", the messinger of spring, wearing fairy wings. He was flanked by two muscular "sea slaves" or Tritons, accompanied by eight young aristocratic women or naiads, to a song describing how Tethys brought blessings to the Ocean King, who was King James. Next one of the Tritons explained the idea of the masque to James and Prince Henry, while the other gave a sword to Prince Charles. Charles got up and gave the sword to Henry, which was understood to be a gift from Tethys or rather Anne of Denmark, and also the sword of Astraea, a goddess of justice associated with Queen Elizabeth.

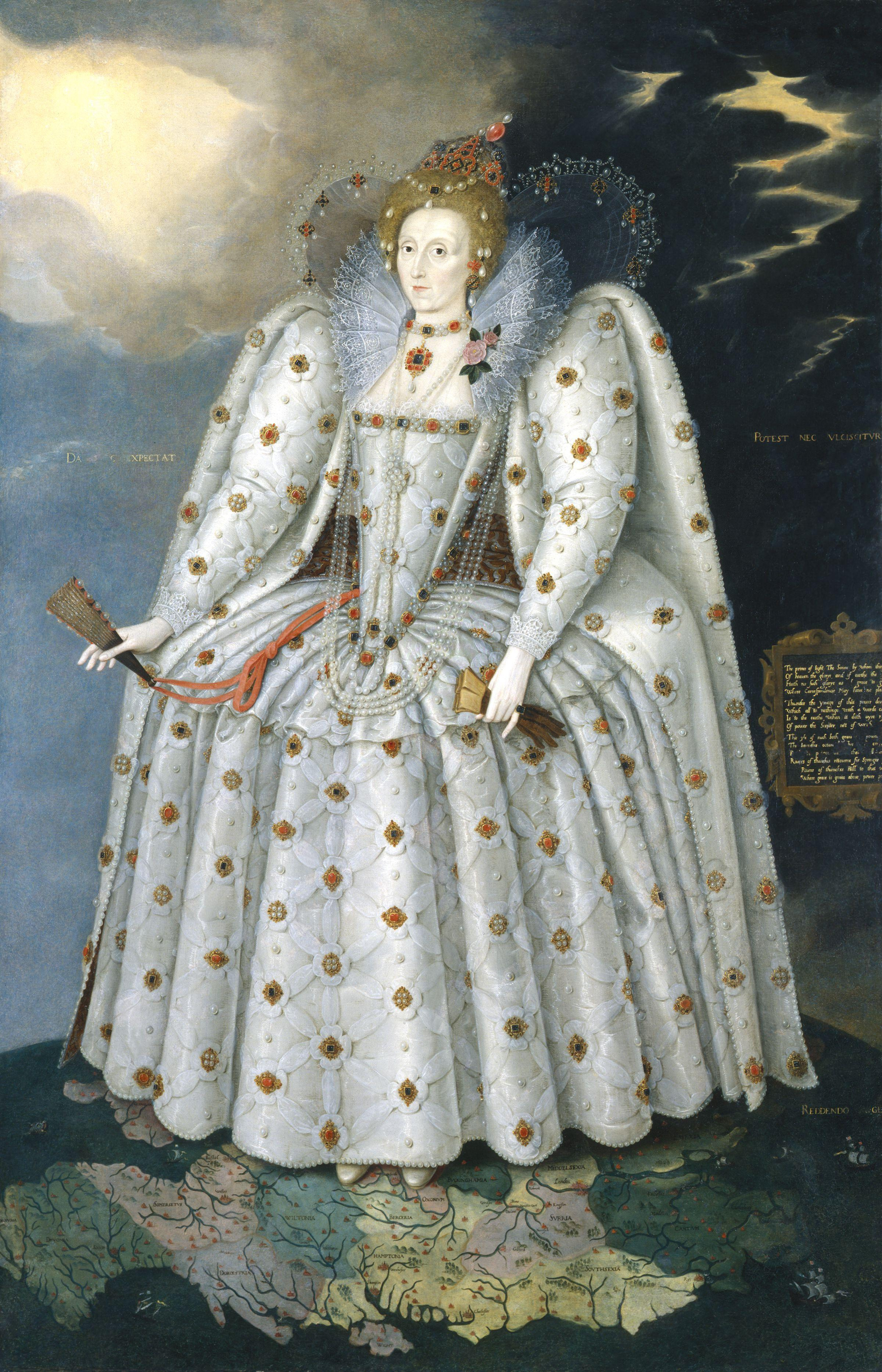
Elizabeth I dominates a map of England in her Ditchley Portrait.

Henry also received a scarf of "Love and Amity" which represented the British Isles. James got a trident representing rule over the kingdoms of England, Scotland and Wales. In his speech the Triton explained the particular significance of Milford Haven as a harbour in Wales where Henry VII began his Union of York and Lancaster. After this gift exchange, Charles returned to his position while twelve maidens, "all of them daughters of earls and barons", danced around him.

Next in the harbour appeared Anne of Denmark seated on a raised throne with a back made like a silver scallop shell draped with gold cloth, set around with lanterns that showed liked jewels. Princess Elizabeth, as the nymph of Thames, sat at the queen's feet. On either side in caves or niches were six women masquers who represented the nymphs or guardian spirits of various rivers. They came down from their caverns one by one and marched in a meandering path towards the Tree of Victory where they offered flowers to the Ocean King. Tethys danced and then reposed under the Tree of Victory, twice. The nymphs then began to take out men from the audience to dance with.

Near the end of the show, one of the tritons reappeared to prevent the audience making for the refreshments. Mercury descended from the roof to announce that Charles and six companions should follow him to bring back the queen and her companions, and restore them from their fishy forms. A scene resembling a wood appeared, from which the queen and her ladies were reunited with the king by Charles and his companions.

The nautical theme included topical allusions in support of British fisheries and the herring industry, and an appeal against attacks on Spanish shipping. The allusions to the geography of the British isles seems a conscious reference to the iconographic programmes of Elizabeth I, as seen in her Ditchley Portrait.

== Cast ==
Prince Charles was Zephyrus. Anne of Denmark was Tethys. Princess Elizabeth appeared as the companion or daughter of Tethys, the "Nymph of Thames". King James was addressed as Oceanus, King of the seas.

The account by a spectator and the 1610 publication name the other women who appeared in Milford Haven harbour as; Arbella Stuart the "Nymph of Trent"; the Countess of Arundel the "Nymph of Arun"; the Countess of Derby the "Nymph of Derwent"; the Countess of Essex the "Nymph of Lee"; the Countess of Dorset the "Nymph of Air"; the Countess of Montgomery the "Nymph of Severn"; the Countess of Haddington the "Nymph of Rother"; Elizabeth Grey the "Nymph of Medway".

Four sisters, daughters of Edward Somerset, 4th Earl of Worcester danced as rivers of Monmouthshire; Lady Catherine Windsor the "Nymph of Usk"; Katherine Petre (1575–1624) the "Nymph of Olwy"; Elizabeth Guildford the "Nymph of Dulesse" (Dulas); and Mary Wintour the "Nymph of Wye".

== Costumes ==
A handful of drawings by Inigo Jones for costumes survive. Daniel described the costumes in detail in his publication Tethys' Festival, or The Queen's Wake (1610). The river nymphs wore head-attire that appeared to be made from shells and coral, with veils attached. Their upper garments were of sky-blue taffeta embroidered with maritime motifs. They had half-skirts of silver cloth worked with gold (the groundwork cut-away), and longer underskirts called "bases" in the sky-blue taffeta. Around the hem of the skirt was a meander of lace like a river with sedge and seaweed banks in gold. At the shoulder was the same work as the half-skirts, with ruffed-out upper sleeves. The lower sleeves matched the bodice with maritime motifs. The satin shoes were embroidered like the short skirts.

Some costume from Tethys' Festival appears in an inventory of Anne of Denmark's wardrobe now held in the library of the University of Cambridge, which lists:

one maskeinge gowne of satten: the bo: [bodies] jagges and tagges of white sattine imbroydery verye riche with gold purle plaett and owes, the skertes of grasse greene satten imbroydery with silver owes alover cutt rounde belowe with peakes and scallops and edged with a silver frenge linde with greene sarsnett.

Costume suppliers included Dorothy Speckard and the Queen's silkman Thomas Henshawe (died 1611). The embroiderer Christopher Shawe worked on the skirts and produced cobweb silver lace with veins of silver and sea green silk, stitched with silver "O" shapes or "oes", and embroidered gold "oes" on tiffany. He also embroidered a pair of sea green satin shoes with gold and silver. Shaw later petitioned for payment for work done for the masque and other embroidery for the queen.

An usher, Peter Frank, prepared the Queen's Majesty's "Tyring roomes, againste the maske".

== Bibliography ==
- Samuel Daniel, Tethys festival, or, The Queenes wake (John Budge, London, 1610).
- David M. Bergeron, 'Creating Entertainments for Prince Henry's Creation (1610)', Comparative Drama, vol. 42, No. 4 (Winter 2008), pp. 433–449.
- John Pitcher, '"In those figures which they seeme", Samuel Daniel's Tethys' Festival', in David Lindley, The Court Masque (Manchester, 1984), pp. 33–46.
