= Elizabeth Howard (d. 1658) =

British noble, courtier to Anne of Denmark (1586–1658)

Elizabeth Howard, Lady Knollys
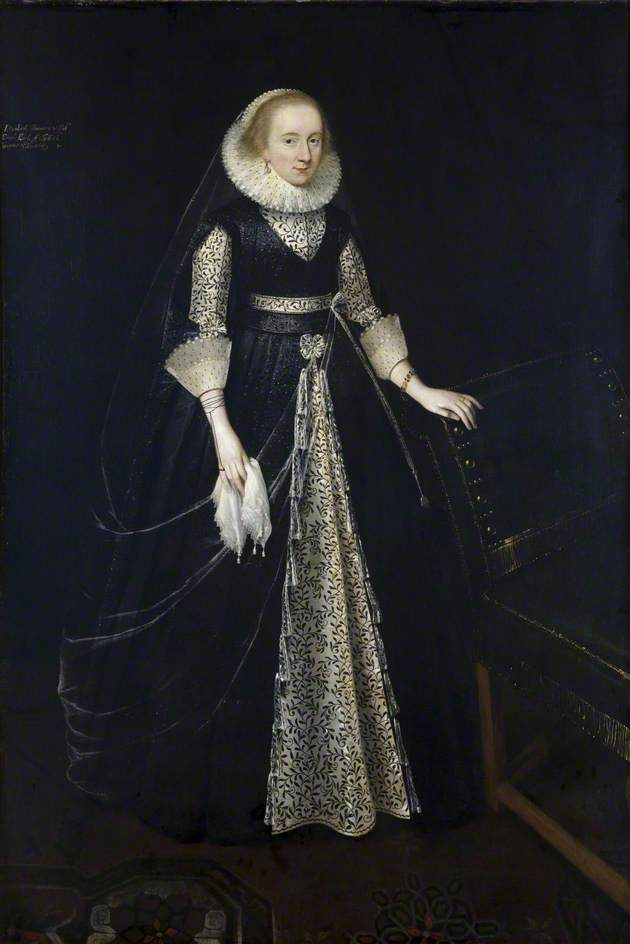
- Born: 1586
- Died: 17 April 1658 (aged 71–72)
- Resting place: Dorking, Surrey
- Title: Viscountess Wallingford, Later Countess of Banbury
- Children: Edward, Nicholas

Elizabeth Howard, Lady Knollys (1586 – 17 April 1658), was a courtier to Anne of Denmark.

Elizabeth Howard was a daughter of Thomas Howard, 1st Earl of Suffolk and Katherine Knyvett. She was born at Audley End and baptised at Saffron Walden on 11 August 1586.

== Dancing at Court ==
Howard had no formal or salaried position in the household of Anne of Denmark, but was often present at court.

She danced as Tethys in Samuel Daniel's masque The Vision of the Twelve Goddesses on 8 January 1604 at Hampton Court dressed in a dark green mantle embroidered with waves, with a headdress of reeds, carrying a trident. On 6 January 1605 she performed as Glycyte, "a cloud full of rain, dropping", in The Masque of Blackness. She also danced in Hymenaei on 5 January 1606 as one of the eight faculties of Juno, who descended from the roof of the old banqueting house in two mechanical clouds, a masque written by Ben Jonson for the marriage of Robert Devereux, 3rd Earl of Essex and her sister Lady Frances Howard.

== Lady Knollys and Countess of Banbury ==
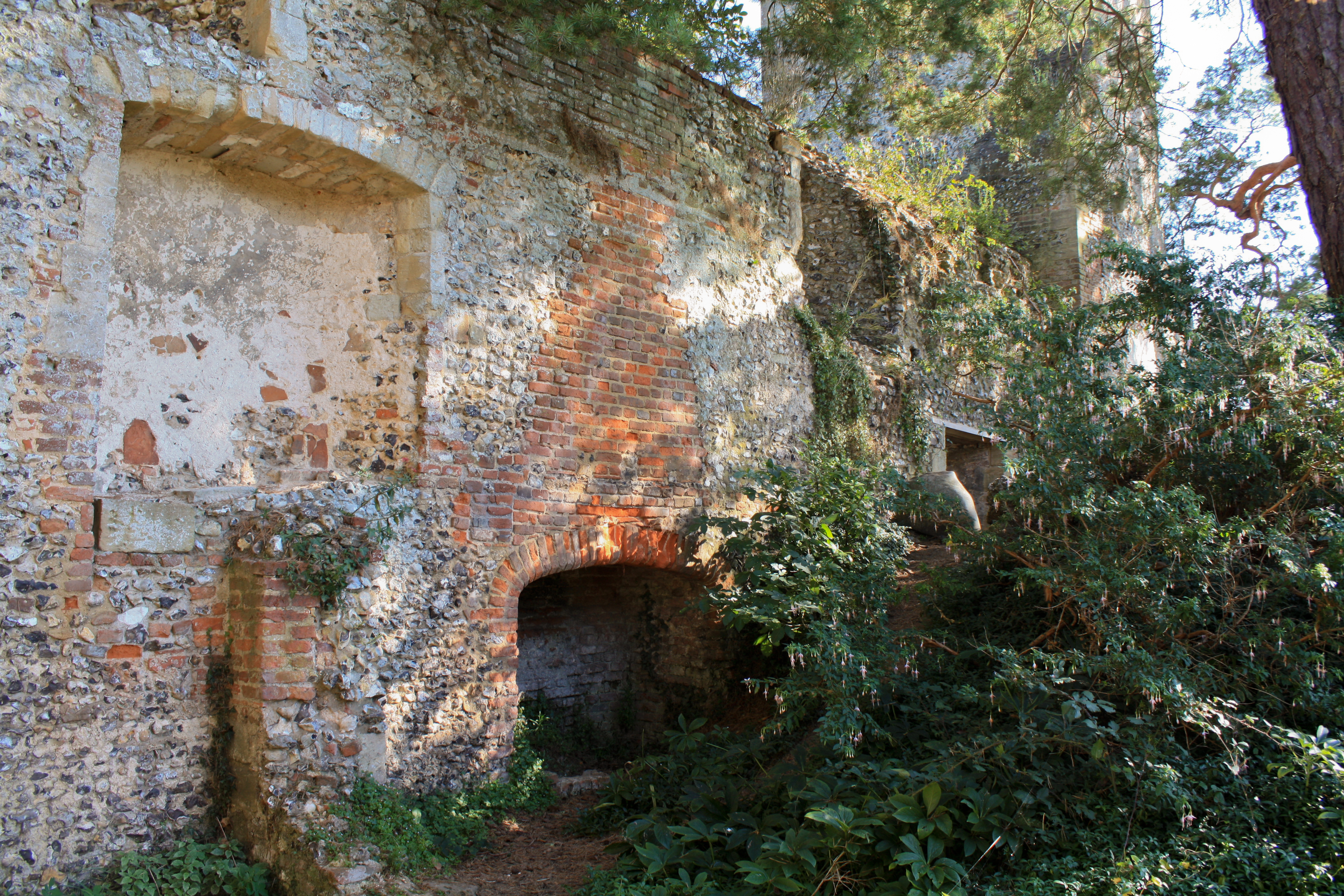
Greys Court was built by her husband's father, Francis Knollys (the elder).

On 23 December 1605, she married Sir William Knollys, who became Viscount Wallingford, and in 1627 Earl of Banbury. Elizabeth was said to be ambitious for her husband's promotion to viscount, so that she could have precedence over Elizabeth Pierrepont, wife of Thomas Erskine, Viscount Fenton.

On 27 April 1613, she and her husband entertained Anne of Denmark at Caversham Park. A description of the entertainment written by Thomas Campion was printed in 1613. The queen was met by a Cynic dressed as a wildman who debated with a Traveller. These two rode to the park gate and were met by two of Robin Hood's men, who sang for the queen. The entertainment continued in the hall of the house after dinner and concluded with masque dancing. The masque actors included four of Elizabeth Knollys's brothers; Lord Walden, Sir Thomas, Master Henry, and Sir Charles.

Anne Clifford went to Suffolk House in London, known as the "Tiltyard", to see her in June 1616, and she saw Anne the daughter of her sister Frances, Countess of Somerset. Lady Knollys seems to have looked after the child at Knollys House in London and taken her to see her mother in the Tower of London. In February 1622 she pleaded that Earl and Countess of Somerset should be allowed to go to her house at New Elm Park (Ewelme in Oxfordshire). It was said that Francis Howard died at Wallingford House in Whitehall in 1632, but the house was sold at a bargain price to Buckingham in 1622 who secured the Somersets's release.

In December 1618, it was noted that "my Lady of Wallingford" was one of the first to sing a verse libel against her sister Countess of Salisbury, and another "cross-libel" was current, criticising her faction.

In January 1619, King James told William Knollys that he was unfit for public office, despite his long service with Queen Elizabeth, because he had "one fault common to him with diverse others of his friends and fellows, which could not stand with his service or the state, that he was altogether guided and overruled by an arch-wife".

In June 1623, she travelled to The Hague to see Elizabeth Stuart, Queen of Bohemia, with Isabella Smythe, Philadelphia Carey Lady Wharton, Lady Hatton and her daughter Lady Purbeck. Dudley Carleton thought she was an unsuitable guest for her (Catholic) religion and other circumstances. They sent a comic letter to Carleton, in the spirit of a masque, explaining their arrival deposited on the shore by Neptune, in hope of an introduction to the King and Queen of Bohemia.

William Knollys, Earl of Banbury died on 25 May 1632 and was buried at Rotherfield Greys near their home at Greys Court.

She married Edward Vaux, 4th Baron Vaux of Harrowden in June 1632. Vaux was said to have wanted to marry her in 1605. He was found to be a recusant in 1606 and his aunt Anne Vaux was arrested in connection with the Gunpowder Plot. He was a probably a cousin of Elizabeth Roper, later Lady Mansell, a maid of honour in Anne of Denmark's household.

In 1641, she had a licence to travel with her son Nicholas.

She died on 17 April 1658 and was buried at Dorking, Surrey. An inscription to her memory at Dorking stated her age was 75, but the register at Saffron Walden shows she was born in 1586.

== Family ==
See also Knollys family. Her sons were supposed to have been the children of Edward Vaux, not William Knollys, so in subsequent years the right of Nicholas and his heirs to the title Earl of Banbury was disputed;

- A daughter (d. 1610).
- Edward, born 10 April 1627, died 1646.
- Nicholas, born 3 January 1631, married Isabella Blount, a daughter of Mountjoy Blount, 1st Earl of Newport and Anne Boteler.

== Portrait ==
- 'Elizabeth Knollys, née Howard (1586–1658), Viscountess Wallingford, Later Countess of Banbury', attributed to Daniel Mytens, English Heritage, Kenwood House.
