= Frances Carr, Countess of Somerset =

English noblewoman (1590–1632)

The Right Honourable The Countess of Somerset
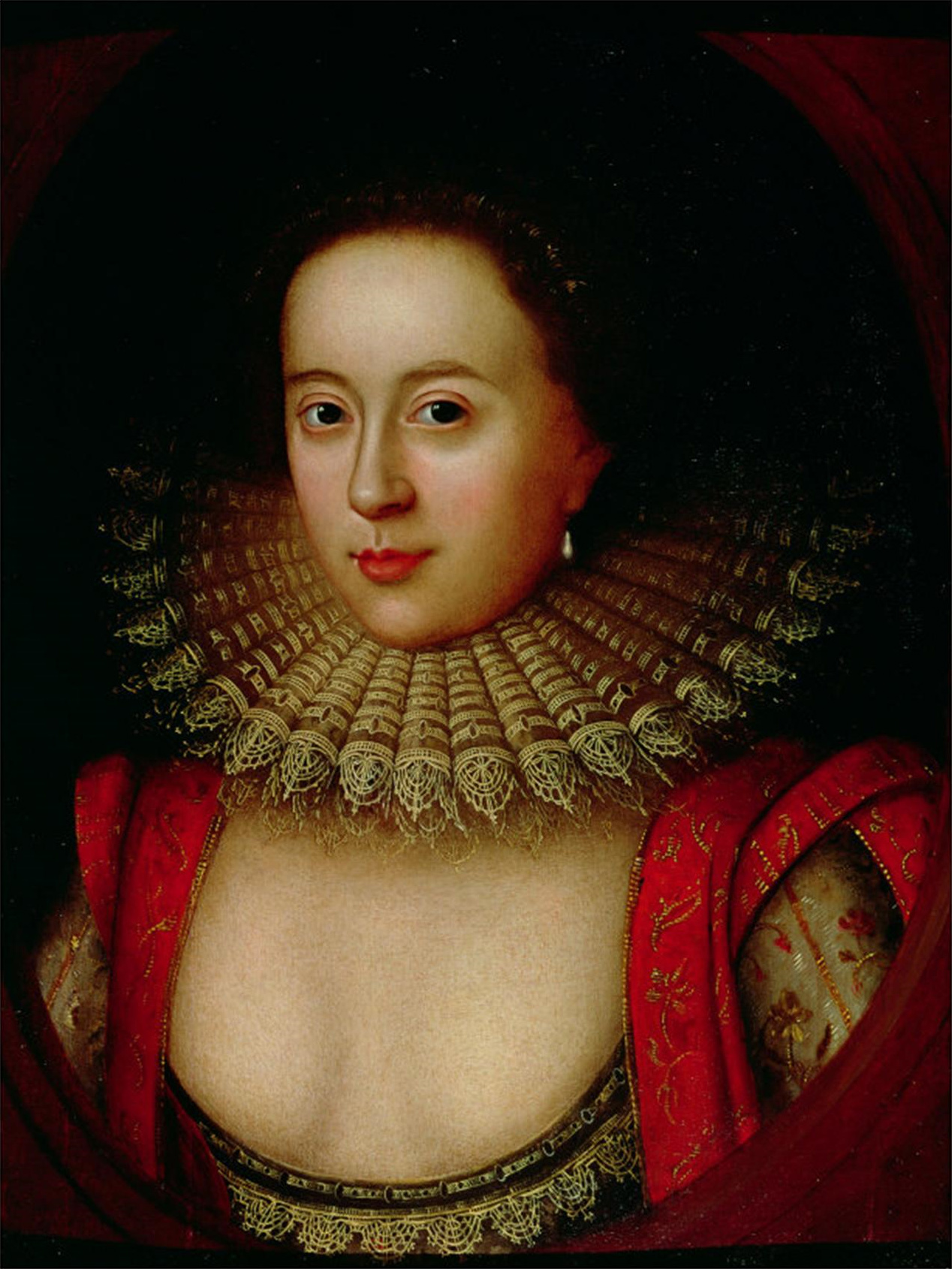
- Frances Howard, Countess of Somerset
- Born: 31 May 1590
- Died: 23 August 1632 (aged 42); Chiswick, London, England
- Buried: 27 August 1632; St Mary the Virgin, Saffron Walden, Essex, England
- Noble family: Howard family
- Spouses: Robert Devereux, 3rd Earl of Essex; Robert Carr, 1st Earl of Somerset
- Issue: Anne Russell, Countess of Bedford
- Father: Thomas Howard, 1st Earl of Suffolk
- Mother: Catherine Knyvett

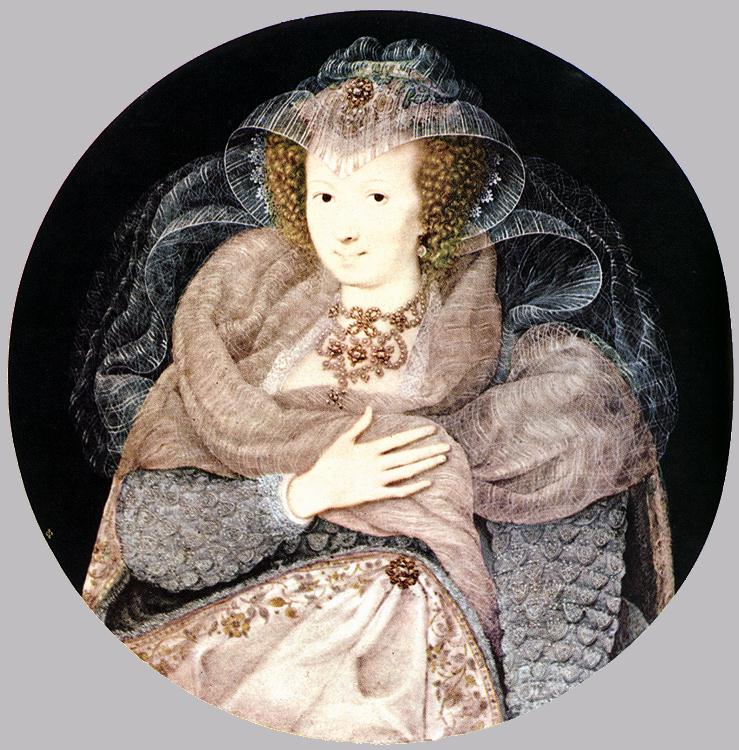
Frances Howard, portrait miniature by Isaac Oliver

Frances Carr, Countess of Somerset (31 May 1590 – 23 August 1632), was an English noblewoman who was the central figure in a famous scandal and murder during the reign of King James I. She was found guilty but spared execution, and was eventually pardoned by the King and released from the Tower of London in early 1622.

== Family ==
She was born Frances Howard, daughter of Lord Thomas Howard (later 1st Earl of Suffolk) and his wife, the former Catherine Knyvet. Frances's father was the second son of Thomas, the 4th Duke of Norfolk, a wealthy and powerful nobleman during the late 16th and early 17th centuries, and Margaret Audley, Duchess of Norfolk. Frances' maternal grandparents were Sir Henry Knyvet, of Charlton, Wiltshire, and Elizabeth Stumpe.

== Failed marriage ==
Lady Frances Howard was married at the age of 14 to the 13-year-old Robert Devereux, 3rd Earl of Essex, the grandson of Francis Walsingham. The marriage was primarily a political union, and, due to their young ages, they did not live together.

Her husband was then sent on a Grand Tour from 1607 to 1609, apparently without having consummated the marriage. When he returned, she made every effort to avoid him. He was at the time seriously ill with smallpox. She was at court and, on 5 June 1610, danced as the "Nymph of Lee", representing the Essex River Lea in the masque Tethys' Festival.

She had also fallen in love with Robert Carr, 1st Earl of Somerset. When she finally took the step of annulment, unable to legally represent herself, her father and her uncle, Henry Howard, Earl of Northampton, represented her and drew up the libel. The situation quickly attracted public attention and was widely observed by those with "prurient minds". She claimed that she had made every attempt to be sexually compliant for her husband, and that, through no fault of her own, she was still a virgin. She was examined by ten matrons and two midwives who found her hymen intact. It was widely rumoured at the time that Sir Thomas Monson's daughter was a substitute, which is possible because she had requested to be veiled during the examination "for modesty's sake".

The matter was a subject of mockery and ribald commentary throughout the court, including:

This Dame was inspected but Fraud interjected
A maid of more perfection
Whom the midwives did handle whilest the knight held the candle
O there was a clear inspection.

In turn, Essex claimed that he was capable with other women, but was unable to consummate his marriage. According to a friend, one morning (while chatting with a group of male companions) he had stood up and lifted his nightshirt to show them his erection, proving, if nothing else, he was physically capable of arousal. When asked why only she caused his failing, he claimed that "she reviled him, and miscalled him, terming him a cow, and coward, and beast."

The idea of satanic involvement was seriously considered by the judges and at one point, it was proposed that Essex should go to Poland to see if he could be "unwitched". The annulment languished and possibly would not have been granted if it were not for the king's intervention (Somerset was the favourite of King James). James VI and I granted the annulment on 25 September 1613.

== Wedding and masques ==
Frances married Somerset on 26 December 1613 at Whitehall Palace. Arrangements for the wedding preoccupied the master of ceremonies, Lewes Lewknor, who invited ambassadors. The value of the wedding presents was rumoured to be £30,000 or £10,000.

The celebrations included The Somerset Masque in the Banqueting House (the Spanish ambassador was prominent in the audience) and The Irish Masque at Court. A performance of The Masque of Flowers, was produced by Francis Bacon and acted by lawyers from Gray's Inn. The Masque of Flowers depicted a scene in Virginia. The Lord Mayor's masque, Thomas Middleton's lost Masque of Cupids, was performed on 4 January 1614 at the Merchant Taylor's Hall to celebrate the wedding.

== Murder of Sir Thomas Overbury ==
Sir Thomas Overbury, a close friend and advisor of Somerset, had tried to advise Somerset not to marry Frances Howard, but the Howard family and their allies were powerful. The Howard faction persuaded the king to offer Overbury the post of Ambassador to Russia, knowing he would refuse in order to stay in England by Somerset's side. When he did so, the king viewed this as an insult and imprisoned Overbury in the Tower of London, where he died. The annulment of Frances and Essex's marriage went through eleven days after Overbury's death, in September 1613.

18 months later, in the summer of 1615, a Yorkshire apothecary's assistant confessed on his deathbed that he had been paid £20 by the Countess of Essex to supply her with poisons for murdering Overbury. James I's Secretary of State, Sir Ralph Winwood, brought the accusations to the King's attention in September, and James in turn urged his Privy Council to investigate the matter. The subsequent investigation and trial revealed that Frances had been surreptitiously poisoning Overbury for some time before his death, by smuggling jellies and tarts into his chamber tainted with white arsenic and other toxic compounds.

The Lieutenant of the Tower, Gervase Helwys, admitted that he had received a confession from Overbury's keeper, Richard Weston, that he had been bribed by the Countess of Essex to administer the poison. Helwys intercepted the tainted sweets at one point and, from then on, took the precaution of having Overbury's food prepared in his private kitchen, taking care to intercept any other food before it could reach Overbury.

However, for fear of the Countess of Essex's political influence, and because his patron was Frances' great-uncle Henry Howard, 1st Earl of Northampton, he took no action against her. Frances eventually succeeded in poisoning Overbury with a smuggled enema laced with mercury chloride.

Frances and her husband were arrested for the murder in mid-October 1615. The trial revealed that Frances had supplied the poisoned enema to Richard Weston through an intermediary, Frances' waiting-woman and companion Anne Turner.

Helwys was tried as an accessory, and his patron at Court, Sir Thomas Monson, was arrested and imprisoned for involvement. Between mid-October and December 1615, Helwys, Turner, Weston, and the apothecary James Franklin were all found guilty as accessories to murder and hanged. Monson twice had his trial delayed, in November and December 1615, before prosecution was ultimately dropped.

Frances Somerset admitted her complicity in the crime; however, her husband maintained his innocence. In 1616, Frances was found guilty of murder, while her husband was found guilty of being an accessory after the deed when it was proven that he burned incriminating documents and made bribes to cover up his wife's involvement. The couple were sentenced to death initially but later confined to the Tower for life on the orders of James I. They received a pardon from the King in January 1622 and were subsequently released from prison. She died 10 years later, on August 22nd, 1632, at the age of 42.

Lord and Lady Somerset had one daughter, Anne, born while Frances was under house arrest at Lord D'Aubigny's house on the Strand,^{[4]} before she was taken to prison in the Tower of London. According to the Diary of Lady Anne Clifford, Frances was taken to the Tower on 24 March 1616. She was looked after by Frances's sister Lady Knollys. Anne married William Russell, 1st Duke of Bedford. Through her, Lady Somerset was the ten-times-great grandmother of the actress Celia Imrie.

Frances was buried at the family seat in Audley End, Essex.
