= The Masque of Flowers =

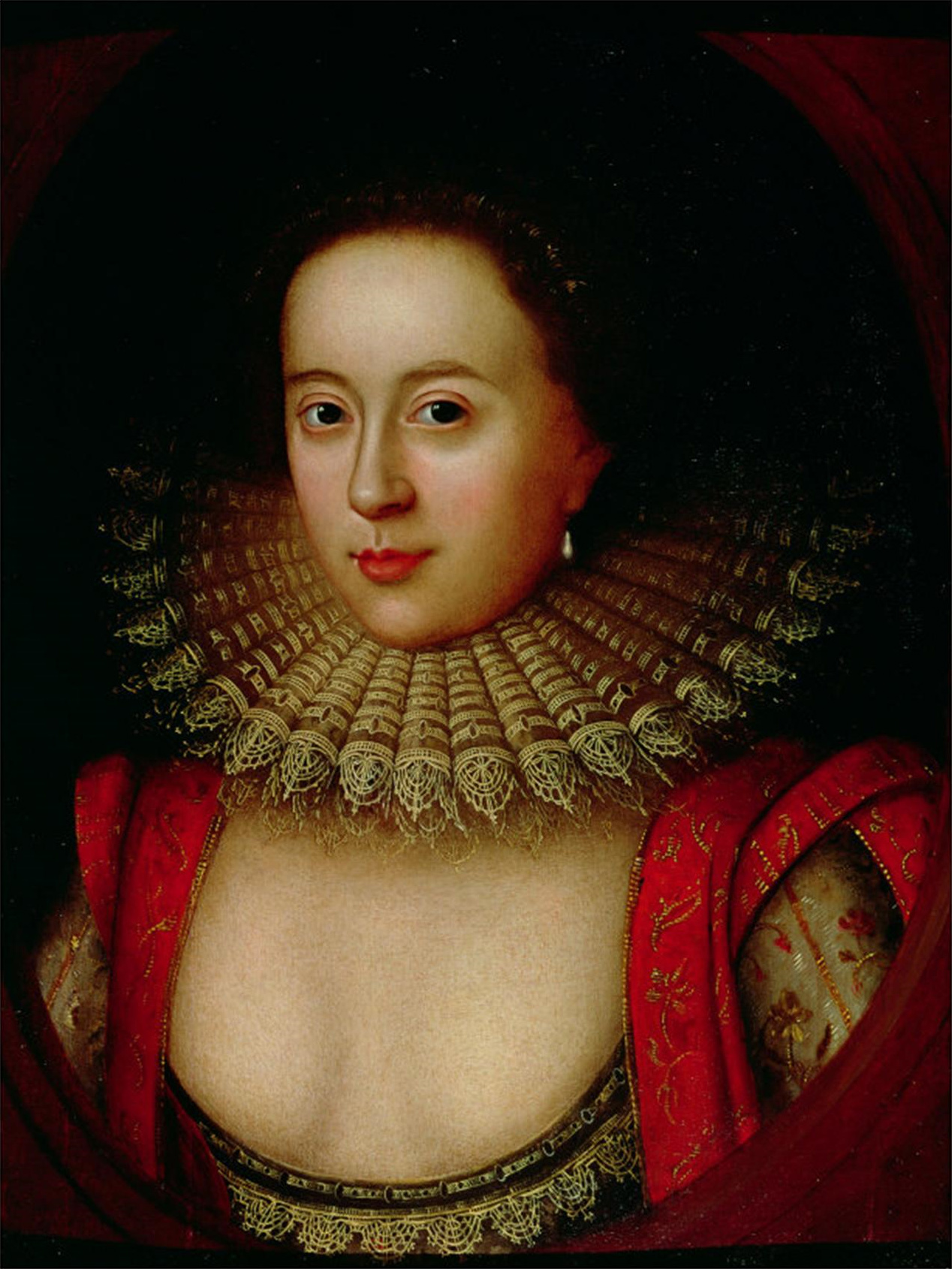
Frances Carr, Countess of Somerset by William Larkin

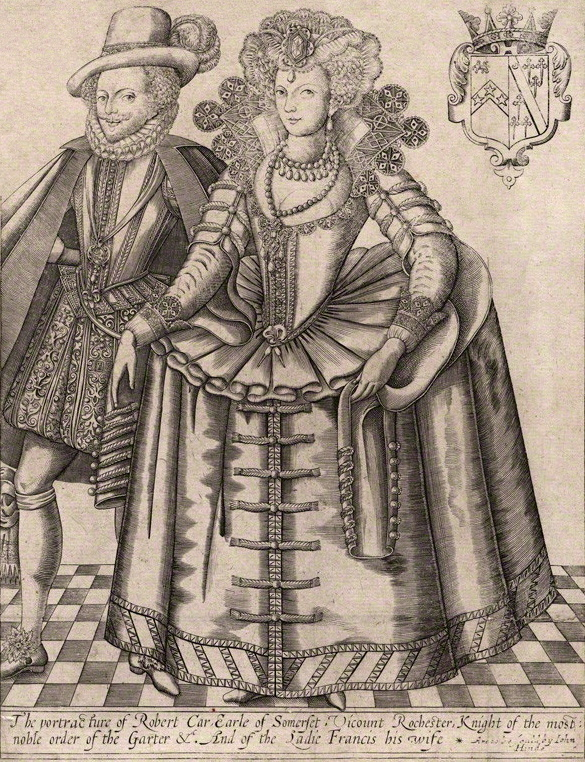
The Earl and Countess of Somerset, by Renold Elstracke

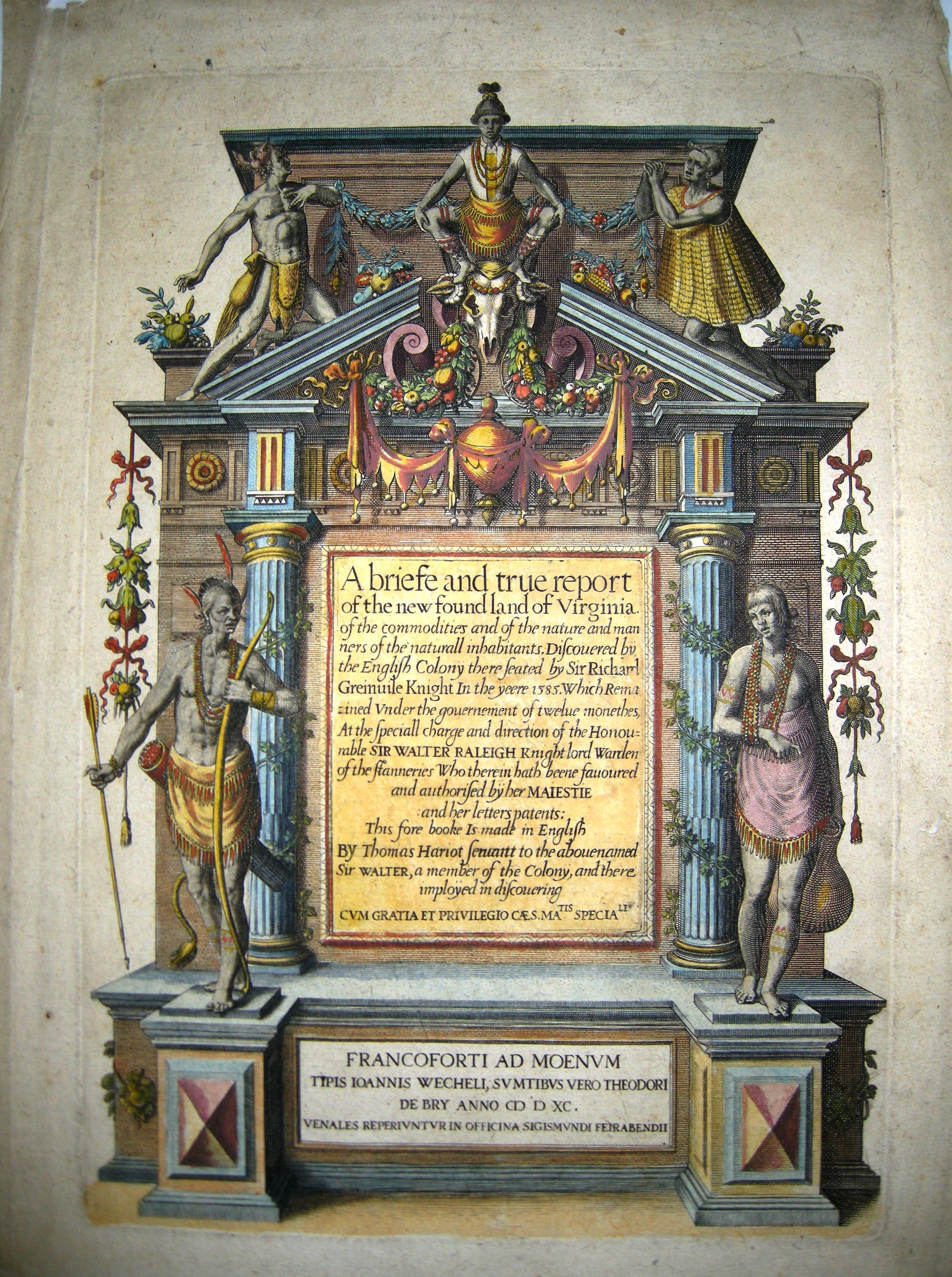
The costume of Kawasha may have been based on the frontispiece of Thomas Hariot's Briefe and True Report, 1590.

The Masque of Flowers was an entertainment on 6 January 1614 to celebrate the marriage of Robert Carr, 1st Earl of Somerset and Frances Howard, Countess of Somerset. Francis Bacon funded the masque to earn favour with King James VI and I and cement his connection with Carr, the King's favourite.

== Masque for a wedding ==
The masque was performed by the gentlemen of Gray's Inn at the Banqueting House at Whitehall Palace. Francis Bacon gave £2000 towards the expenses, refusing an offer of £500 from Henry Yelverton so that he would pay the whole charge and have the honour. Courtiers called it "Mr Attorney's Masque". Bacon owed his promotion to Attorney General to Somerset. Flowers was the last of a number of entertainments, including Thomas Campion's The Somerset Masque, Ben Jonson's A Challenge at Tilt and The Irish Masque at Court, and Thomas Middleton's lost Masque of Cupids.

The author is unknown. The masque was published with a dedication to Francis Bacon. The music is attributed to John Coprario and John Wilson. James VI and I, Anne of Denmark, and Prince Charles attended and afterwards held a banquet with the performers.

The theme has the Sun devise a contest between Winter "Invierno" and Spring "Primavera". That wine was more worthy than tobacco was debated. Men transformed to flowers would be men again.

Silenus, companion of Dionysus the ancient god of wine, entered riding an artificial ass. "Kawasha" dressed with tobacco leaves was carried into the hall by two actors dressed as the inhabitants of Florida, followed by his sergeant carrying a tobacco pipe as big as a caliver rifle. Thirteen masque dancers represented flowers.

Kawasha was the name of a Native American god of tobacco in Virginia, according to Thomas Harriot. Samuel Purchas described the worship of "Kiwasa" in Florida. The wedding entertainments reference colonial enterprise because the bride's father, Thomas Howard, 1st Earl of Suffolk, was an investor.

== Flower costumes ==
According to the 1614 publication, the flower dancers were "apparelled in doublets and round hose of white satin; long white silk stockings; white satin pumps; the doublet richly embroidered in curious panes with embossed flowers of silver, the panes bordered with embroidery of carnation silk and silver; the hose cut in panes answerable to the embroidery of the doublets; the skirts of the doublets embroidered and cut into lily-flowers, and the wings set forth with flowers of several colours, made in silk and frosted with silver; ruff-bands edged with a lace of carnation silk and silver, spangled very thick, and stuck full of flowers of several kinds; fair vizards and tresses; delicate caps of silk and silver flowers of sundry kinds, with plumes of the same, in the top whereof stuck a great bunch of egrets; every Masker's pump fastened with a flower suitable to his cap; on their left arms a white scarf fairly embroidered sent them by the Bride, and on their hands a rich pair of embroidered gloves, sent them by the Bridegroom".

Bacon, probably informed by his experience funding The Masque of Flowers, wrote: "colours that show best by candlelight are white, carnation, and a kind of sea-water green; and oes and spangs as they are of no great cost, so they are of most glory. As for rich embroidery it is lost and not discerned". Sea green costume was used in the masques of Anne of Denmark and also appears in her wardrobe inventory.
