= Sequin =

Small, disk shaped, typically shiny ornament

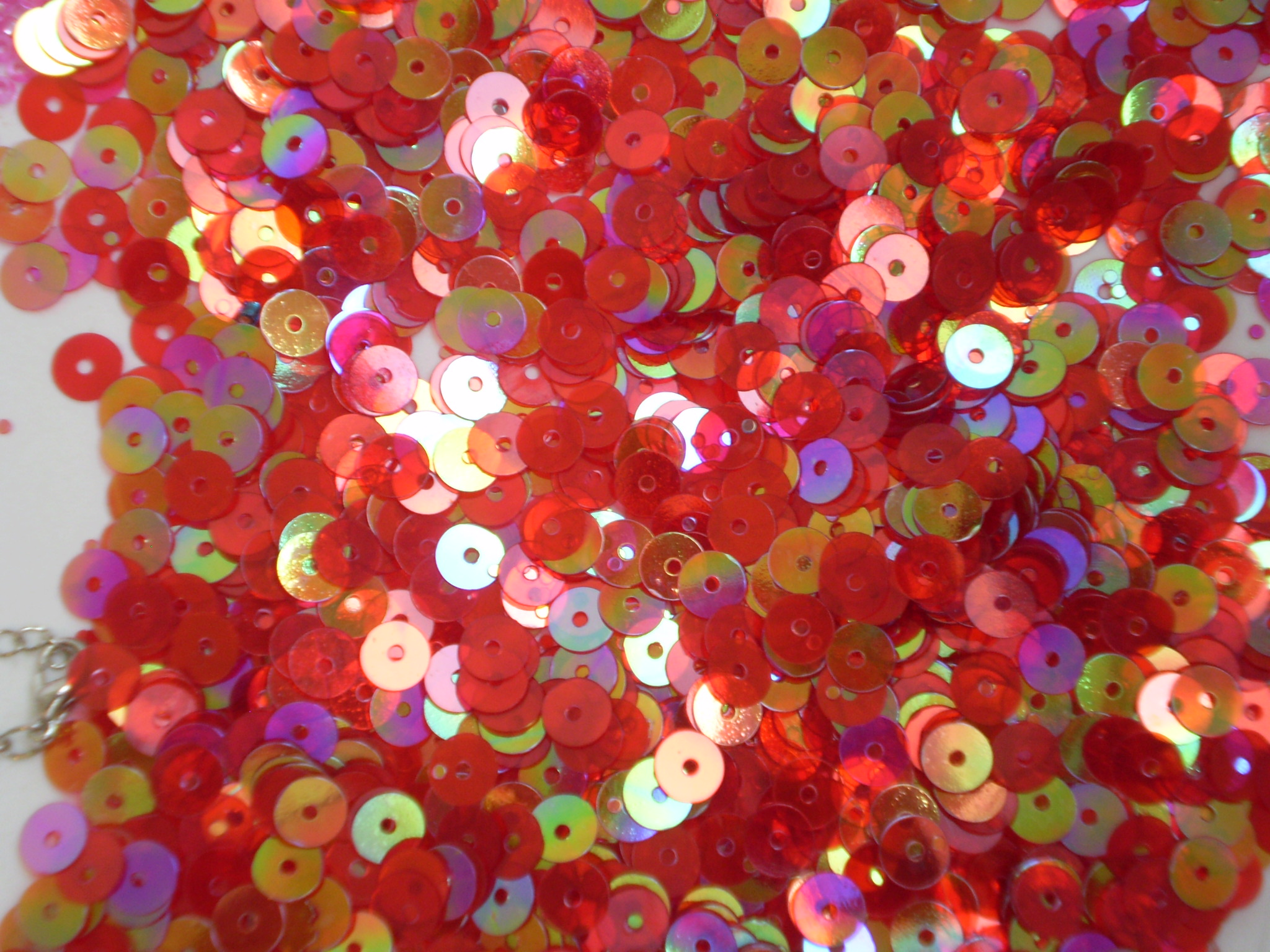
Round, flat sequins

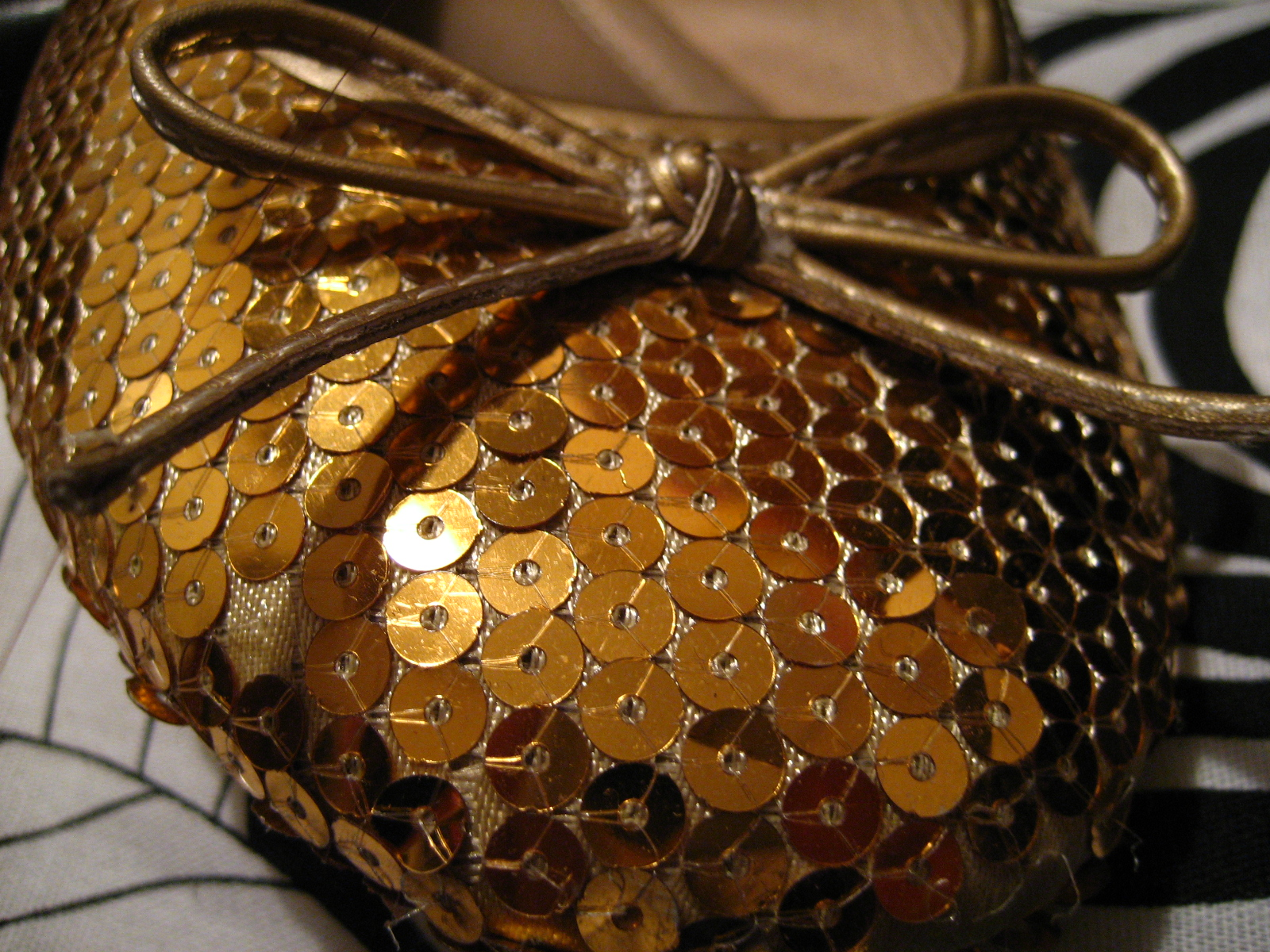
A close-up of a gold sequin-covered shoe.

A sequin (/ˈsiːkwɪn/ SEE-kwin) is a small, typically shiny, generally disk-shaped ornament.

Sequins are also referred to as paillettes, spangles, or diamanté (also spelled diamante). Although the words sequins, paillettes, lentejuelas, and spangles can be used interchangeably, diamanté (literally "set with diamonds") is both an adjective and a plural-only noun, which specifically refers to diamond-shaped sequins and can also be used to mean "artificial diamonds", which serve the same purpose as sequins.

In costuming, sequins have a center hole, while spangles have the hole located at the top. Paillettes are typically very large and flat. Sequins may be stitched flat to the fabric, so they do not move, and are less likely to fall off, or they may be stitched at only one point, so they dangle and move easily, catching more light. Some sequins are made with multiple facets, to increase their reflective ability, while others are stamped out with lobes resembling flower petals.

== Etymology ==
The name sequin originates from the Venetian colloquial noun zechin (Venetian: [(d)zeˈkiŋ]), meaning a Venetian ducat coin, rendered into French as sequin (French: [səkɛ̃]). The ducat stopped being minted after the Napoleonic invasion of Italy, and the name sequin was falling out of use in its original sense. It was then that the name was taken up in France to designate what it means today, as 19th century sequins were made of shiny metal.

== History ==
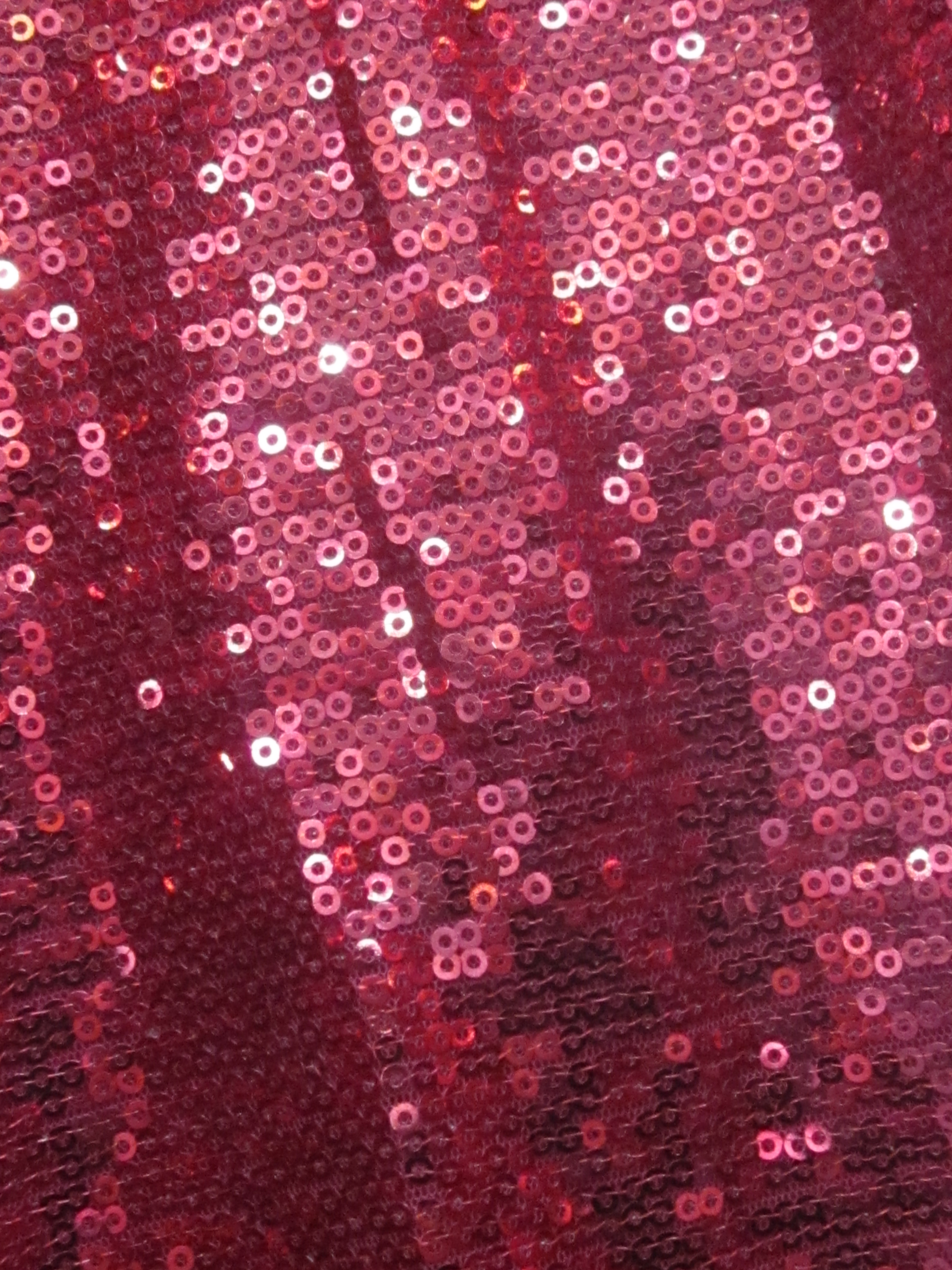
Pink sequin fabric

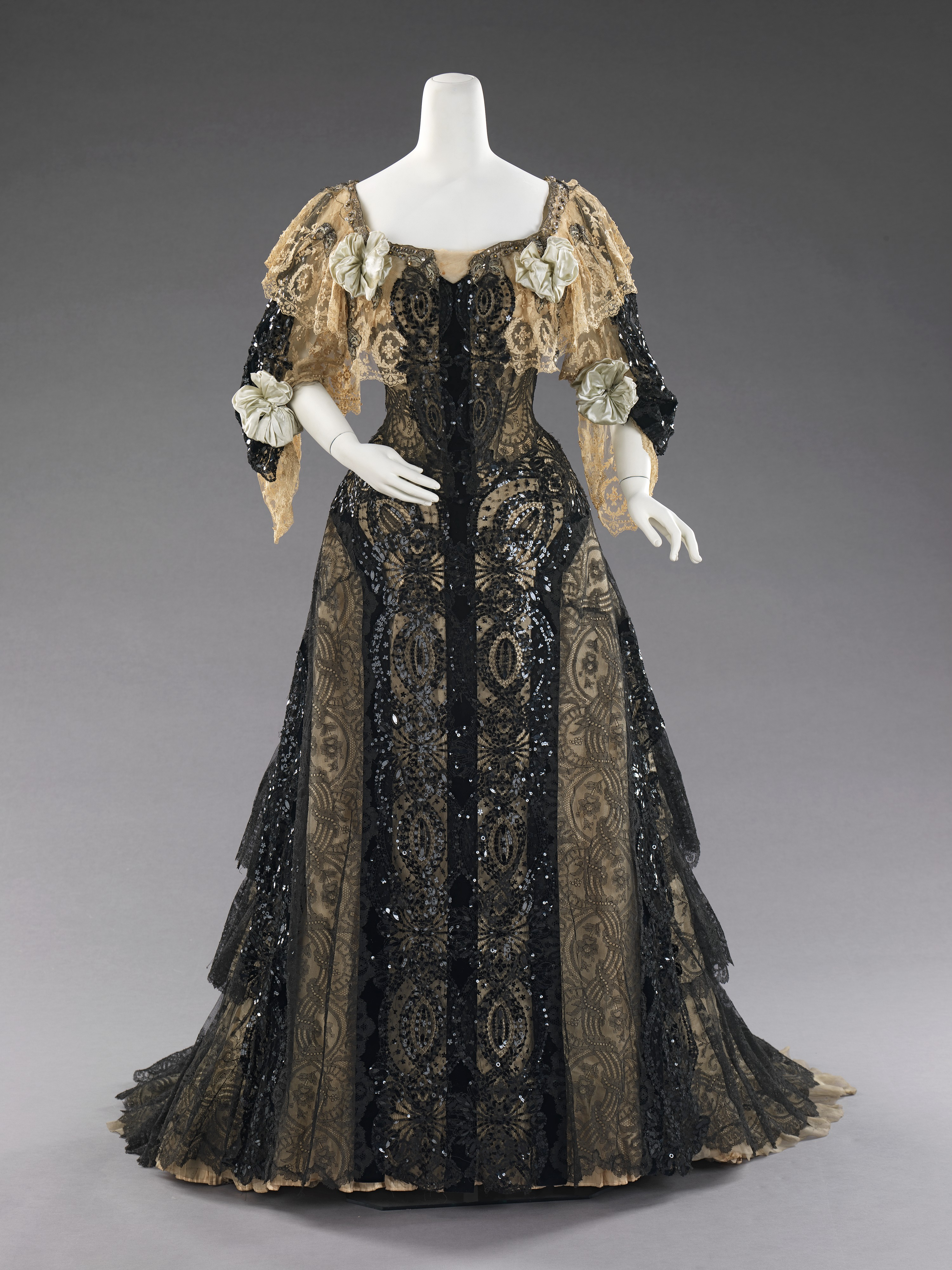
Edwardian era dress covered in spangles

Historically across many parts of the world, attaching metal coins and ornaments to clothes was done to display wealth or status or to keep the item tightly secured.

Sequins made with nautilus shell were found dating back 12,000 years in Indonesia. Evidence exists that gold sequins were being used as decoration on clothing or paraphernalia in the Indus Valley as early as 2500 BC, during the Kot Diji phase. Solid gold sequins sewn into royal garments were found inside the tomb of Tutankhamun.

For the coronation of Henry VII of England in 1485, sequins called "spangles" and "oylets" of silver and gilt were supplied by London goldsmiths. In June 1502, Elizabeth of York paid a coppersmith for "spangelles, settes, square pieces, stars, drops, and points" imitating silver and gold for costumes for "disguysings" at the Tudor court. An embroiderer at the court of Elizabeth I, John Parr, sewed spangles on the sleeves and bodices of gowns for her ladies in waiting. Some sequins used for masque costume in the Tudor and Stuart period were known as "Oes".

By the 17th century, the modern sequin consisting of a small thin metal disk, known as spangle, appeared in Europe. These were made by punching out the desired shape from a thin metal sheet. Spangles (mainly made out of reflective bits of metals) sewn into jackets, bonnets, and dresses were popular among the European nobility and upper class from the 17th to 19th centuries.

During the Edwardian era, the usage of spangles became increasingly popular and haute-couture designers like Callot Soeurs designed evening dresses fully covered in sequins, often times using sequins of different colors to form intricate patterns.

During the 1920s, after the discovery of the Tomb of Tutankhamun, sequins witnessed renewed popularity as a consequence of Egyptomania. The usage of sequins (typically made out of metal) was widely popularized as a fashion statement by flapper girls during this period.

In the 1930s, lightweight electroplated gelatin sequins were produced, which were significantly less heavy than their metal counterparts. However, the gelatin sequins would melt if they got wet or too warm. Algy Trimmings Co. (an apparel manufacturing company), working with Kodak, produced clear plastic sequins, although it often suffered from brittleness. Polyester film was later used to surround the plastic sequin to safely wash it. Eventually, vinyl plastic mostly replaced film and clear plastic because of its durability and cost effectiveness.

In the late 1960s, sequins began to be widely used by popular musicians such as The Supremes. Sequins continued to be popular into the 1970s and early 1980s. They also featured prominently in Y2K fashion.

== See also ==
- Glitter
- Oes
- Pearly Kings and Queens
