= Catherine Howard, Countess of Suffolk =

English court office holder (1564–1638)

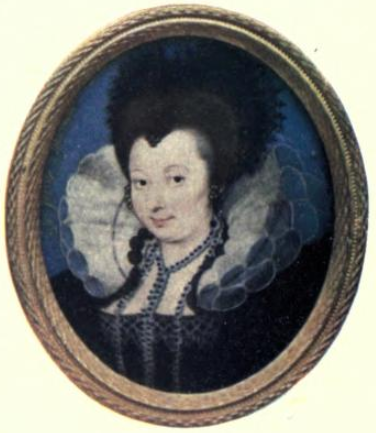
Katherine Knyvett, Countess of Suffolk – Miniature by Nicholas Hilliard

Catherine Howard, Countess of Suffolk (née Knyvet/Knyvett; 1564–1638) was an English court office holder who served as lady-in-waiting to the queen consort of England, Anne of Denmark.

== Private life ==
Catherine was born in Charlton Park, Wiltshire, the oldest child of Sir Henry Knyvet (or Knyvett) and his wife, Elizabeth Stumpe. Her uncle was Thomas Knyvet (or Knyvett), who foiled the "Gunpowder Plot".

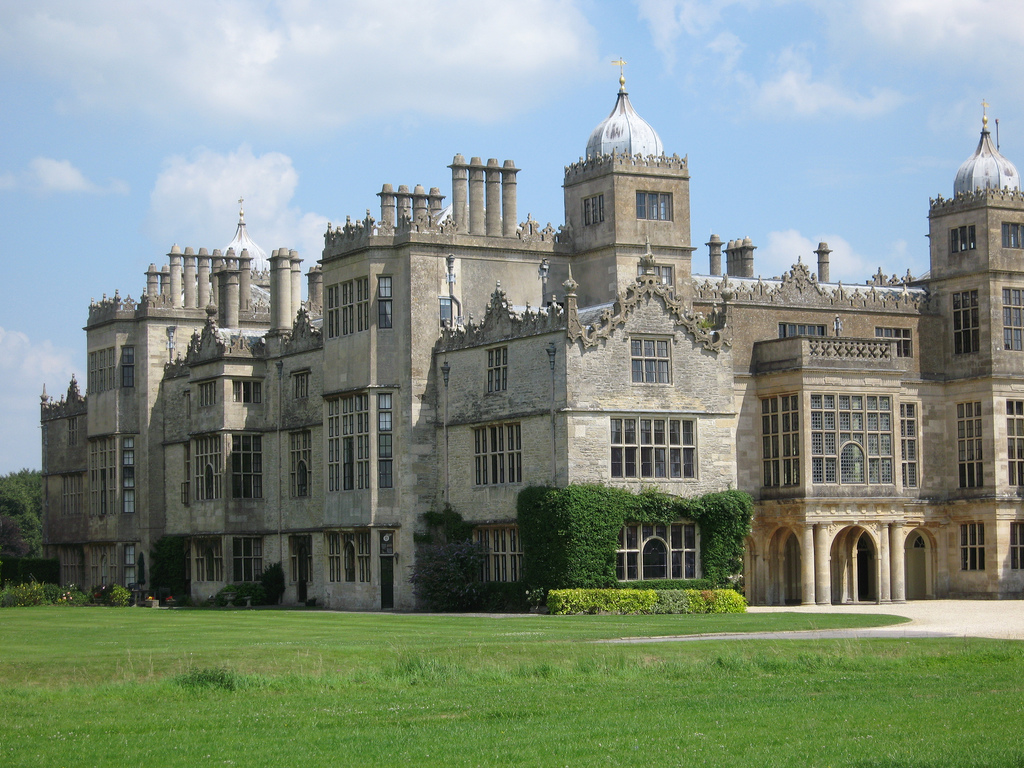
Charlton Park, Malmesbury, Wiltshire

Early in her life, Catherine married Richard Rich, son of Robert Rich, 2nd Baron Rich, and grandson of Richard Rich, 1st Baron Rich. After his death in 1580, she married Thomas Howard, who, twenty years later, was named the Earl of Suffolk.

On the death of her father in 1598, Catherine inherited Charlton Park, Wiltshire, which thereafter became the seat of the Earls of Suffolk.

== Courtier ==
Howard gained a place in Queen Elizabeth I's bedchamber and the title of Keeper of the Jewels in 1599. She continued to hold comparable positions after the Union of the Crowns in the reign of James VI and I. On 8 June 1603, she received some of Elizabeth's jewels from the Tower of London for Anne of Denmark. Howard became a lady of drawing chamber to Anne of Denmark, and keeper of her jewels until 1608.

Lady Anne Clifford wrote that the Countess of Suffolk, the young Lady Derby, and Audrey Walsingham were at Dingley, among the courtiers greeting Anne of Denmark on 23 June. Clifford said these three were great favourites of the statesman Robert Cecil. According to Arbella Stuart, Anne of Denmark asked the Countess of Suffolk and Audrey Walsingham to select some of Elizabeth's old clothes from a store in the Tower of London for a masque in January 1604, The Vision of the Twelve Goddesses. Anne of Denmark appeared as Pallas, flanked by Lady Rich as Venus and the Countess of Suffolk as Juno.

=== Spanish gifts ===
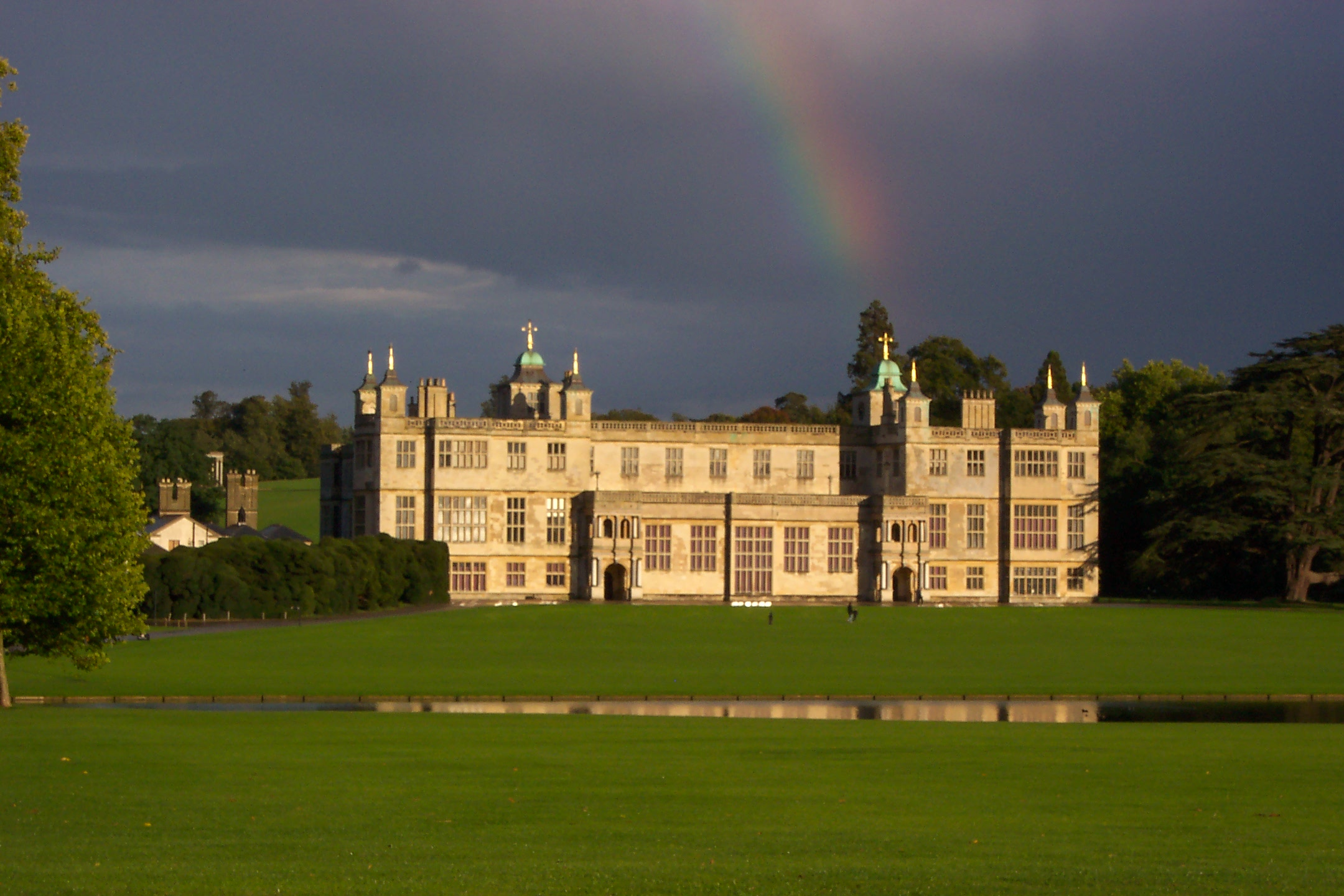
Satirists alleged that Spanish diplomatic gifts funded the building of Audley End

When the Spanish ambassador Juan Fernández de Velasco y Tovar, 5th Duke of Frías came to London to sign a peace treaty, Anne of Denmark and the Countess observed his arrival at Somerset House from a barge on the Thames on 14 August 1604. The barge carried no insignia and they wore black masks.

The ambassador, known as the Constable of Castile, gave gifts to several English courtiers. The Countess of Suffolk told the resident ambassador Juan de Tassis, 1st Count of Villamediana that she deserved jewels, cash, and a pension for her services. Spanish agents discussed the possibility of "liberty of conscience" with her, a plan that Catholics might be allowed to worship in private in Protestant England.

The Countess of Suffolk received a pension from Spain. Spanish diplomats referred to her and her pension by an alias or codename, successively using Roldán, Príamo, and Amadís. The English ambassador in Madrid John Digby uncovered details of some payments and kept King James informed.

According to the 1650 satirical history The Court and Character of King James, the Countess received gifts of great value and Spanish bounty payments that contributed to the costs of building Audley End. The author, possibly Anthony Weldon, also asserts that she benefitted as a "double sharer" as a mistress or close associate of Robert Cecil, Secretary of State.

=== Life at court ===
Howard danced in another of Anne of Denmark's masques, The Masque of Blackness written by Ben Jonson. Anne of Denmark wanted the actors to look African so the actors painted their faces black. In 1611, the poet Emilia Lanier chose to make her one of dedicatees of her poem Salve Deus Rex Judaeorum.

She was granted authority over the lodgings at Greenwich Palace where Anne gave birth to the Princess Sophia in 1606. She was in such a position of high esteem within the court, she would have been given the honour of being a godmother if the child had not perished.

Howard strove successfully to gain rank in court but proved to be corrupt. She served as a liaison between Spain and the Earl of Salisbury, and demanded bribes for doing so. Her husband Thomas Howard was appointed Lord Treasurer, which allowed her more opportunity for financial gain. She was beautiful in her younger years, and during her time at court had many suitors and a string of alleged love affairs, using the position her husband achieved in the government to extort kickbacks from her lovers.

=== Northampton House ===
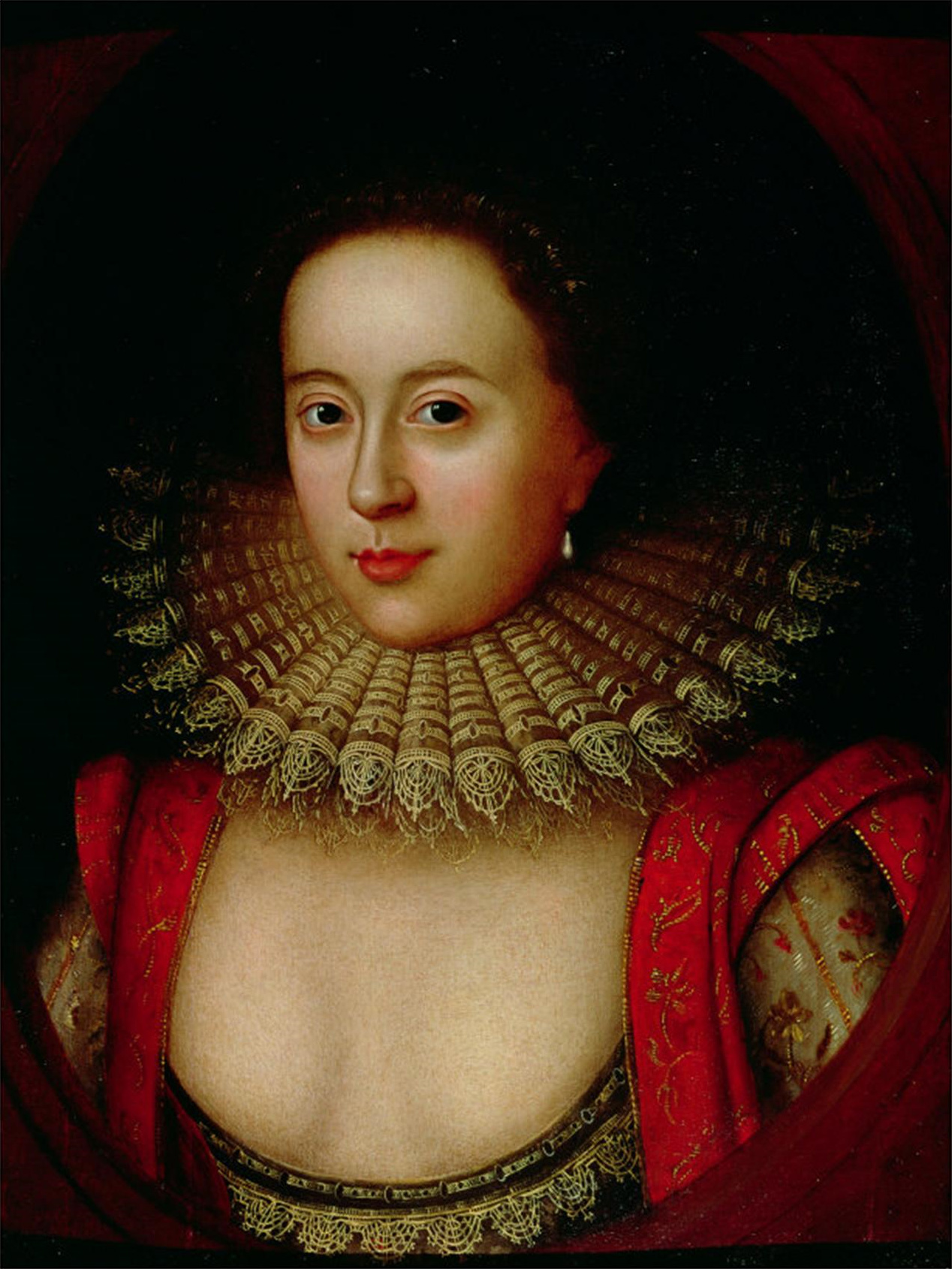
The Countess of Suffolk's daughter Frances Carr, Countess of Somerset

When the Earl of Northampton died in 1614, the Suffolks inherited Northampton House on London's Strand. The Countess of Suffolk paid £5000 for the furnishings, detailed in a surviving inventory. She raised the money with the royal favourite, the Earl of Somerset, who was married to her daughter Frances. A loan for a part of the sum secured improperly on crown money by Arthur Ingram.

As the Thomas Overbury scandal was revealed in November 1615, King James commanded that the Countess of Suffolk leave London for the country at Audley End. In March 1616, she made plans to visit Spa in Belgium, a health resort.

Lady Anne Clifford mentions visiting the Suffolks at Northampton House in December 1616. There, in 1619, at the age of 55, Catherine, Countess of Suffolk was the victim of an attack of smallpox. According to Lady Anne Clifford, this "spoiled that good face of hers, which had brought to other much misery and to herself greatness which ended with much unhappiness".

== Star Chamber trial ==
Details of corrupt practices came out in the Suffolk's Star Chamber trial in February 1619. The main charges against the Earl were embezzling royal jewels, diverting money provided for artillery, exporting artillery, abuse in the alum works, and misuse of crown money. John Bingley was their broker for the "misemployment of the King's treasure".

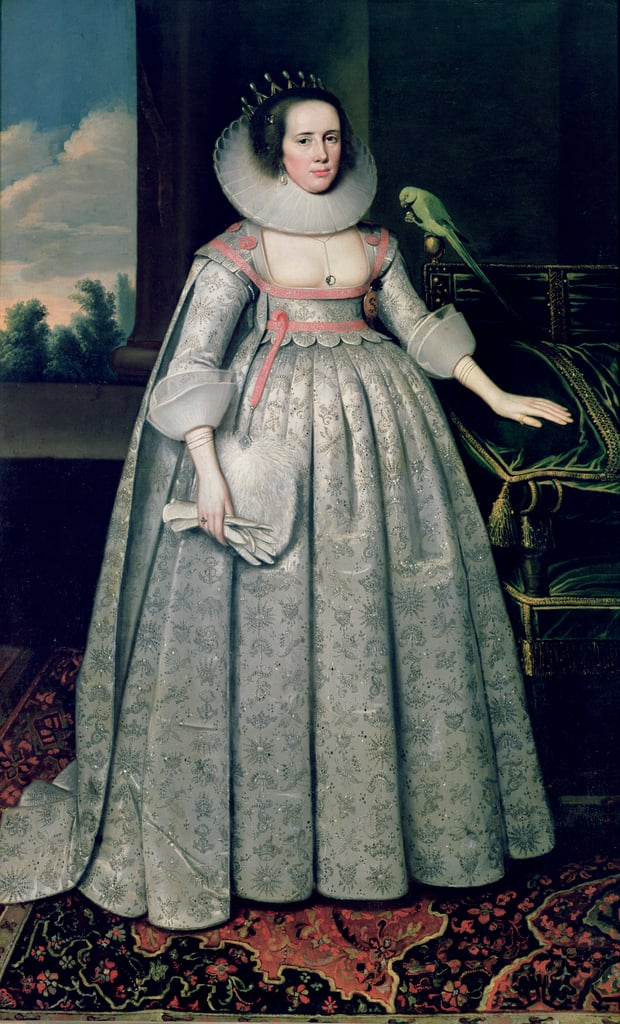
Katherine Knyvett, Countess of Suffolk by Paul van Somer

The Suffolks claimed to have received perks and gifts, rather than bribes, but the judge Francis Bacon said "New Year's gifts do not last all the year". Sir John Finet alleged "to be spared a bond of £500, a citizen gave £83 and a sable muff to the countess". It was alleged that the Countess obtained a rake-off from money owed to the silkman Benjamin Henshawe for supplies to the royal wardrobe. Henshawe was Bingley's brother-in-law.

The Suffolks were found guilty of corrupt practices, and the Countess and her family were banned from court. They faced heavy fines and imprisonment at the Tower of London. The couple were released late in 1619, partly due to the intercession of the Duke of Buckingham.

Peers generally sympathised with the Earl for being caught in her web of corruption, and she endured the brunt of the blame for their fall from grace. After being expelled from court, she continued to write letters on behalf of others seeking court positions.

== Family ==
Catherine's children included:

- Theophilus Howard, 2nd Earl of Suffolk (1582–1640), who married Elizabeth Home, daughter of George Home, 1st Earl of Dunbar
- Elizabeth Howard (c. 1583–1658); married firstly William Knollys, 1st Earl of Banbury, then Edward Vaux, 4th Baron Vaux of Harrowden
- Robert Howard (1598–1653); married Catherine Nevill, a daughter of Henry Nevill, 9th Baron Bergavenny
- William Howard (1586–before 1672)
- Thomas Howard, 1st Earl of Berkshire (1587–1669), who married Elizabeth Cecil, daughter of William Cecil, 2nd Earl of Exeter in 1614. He inherited the Wiltshire estates and Charlton Park that had passed on to his mother after her father's death.
- Catherine Howard (c. 1588–1673) who married William Cecil, 2nd Earl of Salisbury.
- Frances Howard (1590–1632); married firstly Robert Devereux, 3rd Earl of Essex then Robert Carr, 1st Earl of Somerset
- Charles Howard (1591–21 June 1626); married Mary Fitzjohn
- Henry Howard (1592–1616); married Elizabeth Bassett
- Edward Howard, 1st Baron Howard of Escrick (d. 24 April 1675)
- Margaret Howard (c. 1599 – 1608)
