= David Bergeron (historian) =

American historian

David Moore Bergeron (born 1938) is an American professor of English and literary historian.

== Career ==
Born in Alexandria, Louisiana, Bergeron gained his PhD at Vanderbilt University in 1964. He is an Emeritus Professor of English at the University of Kansas.

Bergeron has researched the early Stuart court, drama and masque, civic pageantry and festivals, and the sexuality of James VI and I. Bergeron has argued for the topicality of Shakespeare's plays, which would be viewed by his contemporaries in the light of their own cultural realities.

== Selected publications ==
- The Duke of Lennox, 1574–1624: A Jacobean Courtier's Life (Edinburgh University Press, 2022).
- "Gerrard Herbert's Reports about Drama Performances, 1617–19", Studies in Philology, 118:4 (Fall 2021), pp. 725–741.
- Shakespeare through Letters (2020).
- "Pericles: A Performance a letter, 1619", Sophie Chiari and John Mucciolo, "Performances at Court in the Age of Shakespeare" (Cambridge, 2019), pp. 107–119.
- "Court Masques about Stuart London", Studies in Philology, 113: 4 (Fall 2016), pp. 822–849. doi:10.1353/sip.2016.0030
- "Are we turned Turks?: English Pageants and the Stuart Court", Comparative Drama, 44:3 (September 2010), pp. 255–275.
- "Creating Entertainments for Prince Henry's Creation (1610)", Comparative Drama, 42:4 (Winter 2008), pp. 433–449.
- "The 'I' of the Beholder: Thomas Churchyard and the Norwich Pageant", Jayne Elisabeth Archer, Elizabeth Goldring, Sarah Knight, Progresses, Pageants, and Entertainments of Queen Elizabeth (Oxford, 2007).
- King James and Letters of Homoerotic Desire (University of Iowa, 2002).
- "King James and Robert Carr: Letters and Desire", Explorations in Renaissance Culture, 22:1 (1996), pp. 1–30.
- "Masculine Interpretation of Queen Anne, Wife of James I", Biography, 18:1 (Winter 1995), pp. 42–54.
- "Pageants, Politics, and Patrons", Medieval and Renaissance Drama in England, 6 (1993), pp. 139–152.
- Royal Family, Royal Lovers (University of Missouri, 1991).
- '"Richard II" and Carnival Politics', Shakespeare Quarterly, 42:1 (1991), pp. 33–43.
- Shakespeare's Romances and the Royal Family (University of Kansas, 1985).
- Pageants and Entertainments of Anthony Munday: A Critical Edition (New York: Garland, 1985).
- "Women as Patrons of English Renaissance Drama", Guy Fitch Lytle and Stephen Orgel, Patronage in the Renaissance (Princeton, 1981), pp. 285–290.
- "Elizabeth's Coronation Entry (1559): New Manuscript Evidence", ELF, 8 (1978), pp. 3–9.
- Twentieth-Century Criticism of English Masques, Pageants, and Entertainments: 1558–1642 (Trinity University Press, 1972).
- English Civic Pageantry (Edward Arnold, 1971).
- "Jack Straw in Drama and Pageant", Guildhall Miscellany, 2:10 (1968).
