= Tiffany (silk) =

Light, thin, transparent silk material

Tiffany (silk) is a thin, nearly transparent silk fabric similar to gauze, extant more commonly in the 16th and 17th centuries.

== Characteristics ==
Tiffany reveals the wearer's skin.

== Types ==
Tiffany varied from plain, starched fabric woven of silk to flax-based fabric called housewife's cloth (Randle Holme, 1688).

== Use ==
Tiffany has been worn as mourning attire, and appeared as trimmings, veils, and dress fabrics, napkins, tablecloths, and scarves. In the 19th century, stiffened tiffany was used in artificial flower making.

In 1589, the Earl of Worcester gave Elizabeth I a hat of tiffany set with twenty-eight gold buttons, with an additional eight gold buttons affixed to the hat band and feather.

== See also ==
- Taffeta
