= Andrew Kerwyn =

English administrator, stonemason and paymaster of the royal works

Andrew Kerwyn (died 1615) was an English administrator, stonemason, and paymaster of the royal works for James VI and I from 20 August 1604. His allowance was two shillings daily.

== Masons in London ==
He may have been a son of William Kerwyne or Kerwin, a stonemason commemorated by a tomb in St Helen's Church, Bishopsgate. Andrew Kerwyn was probably the mason paid £16 in December 1593 for work on a pinnacle of London Guildhall, and appointed a gun stone maker to the royal ordinance in 1601. He may have been a relation of Robert Kerwin (died 1615), who worked for Robert Sidney, 1st Earl of Leicester at Penshurst Place.

== Career ==
Kerwyn's name is conspicuous in the records of Whitehall Palace and several masque entertainments staged at the Banqueting House. He provided a stage on wheels for The Masque of Blackness, designed by Inigo Jones. Stage mechanisms for The Masque of Queens in February 1609 included "sundry seats above for the Queen and ladies to sit on and be turned round about".

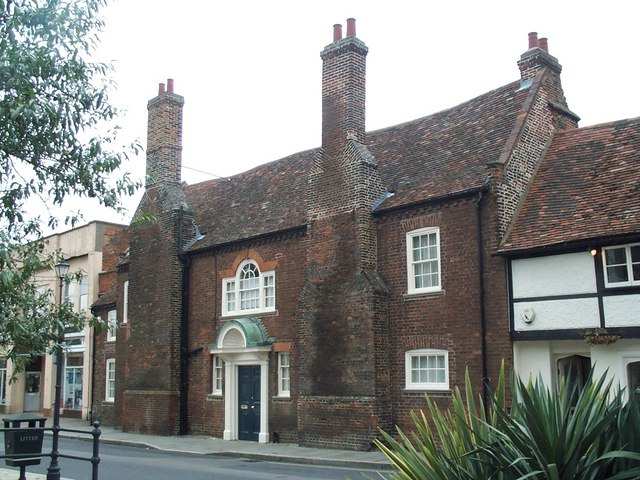
King James' Palace, Royston

In 1604, Kerwyn was given money for the building of a barn and stable at the Charing Cross Royal Mews for Henry Frederick, Prince of Wales, and for works at the King's House at Royston. Kerwyn provided Oxfordshire stone for Knole in 1608 for the Lord Treasurer, Thomas Sackville, 1st Earl of Dorset. He also repaired the large tennis court at Whitehall Palace, known as the "Brake" or "Baloune Court", and managed improvements in Hyde Park in 1612, diverting a stream to flow into Rosamund's pond in St James's Park.

Kerwyn died in 1615 and the records for The Golden Age Restored include payments to his wife Margaret Kerwyn (died 1619), who acted as his administratrix. They owned leases of tenement houses in St Martin's parish which they let to the carpenters William Portington and Matthew Banks. Their household furnishings included tapestry cushions embroidered with the masons' arms. The mason's company arms of a compass were used on William Kerwin's 1594 monument.

== Somerset House ==
Kerwyn's last account for the royal works was dated 30 September 1615. An account made in September 1616 includes a payment of £568 to Kerwyn made by Zachary Bethell, (an usher in the household of Anne of Denmark), for works at Somerset House. The financial transactions seem to have contributed to a controversy among the officials of the royal works, which, according to John Webb, involved Inigo Jones.
