= Jacobean era =

Period in English and Scottish history and culture

- 1603–1625
Elizabethan era	Caroline era
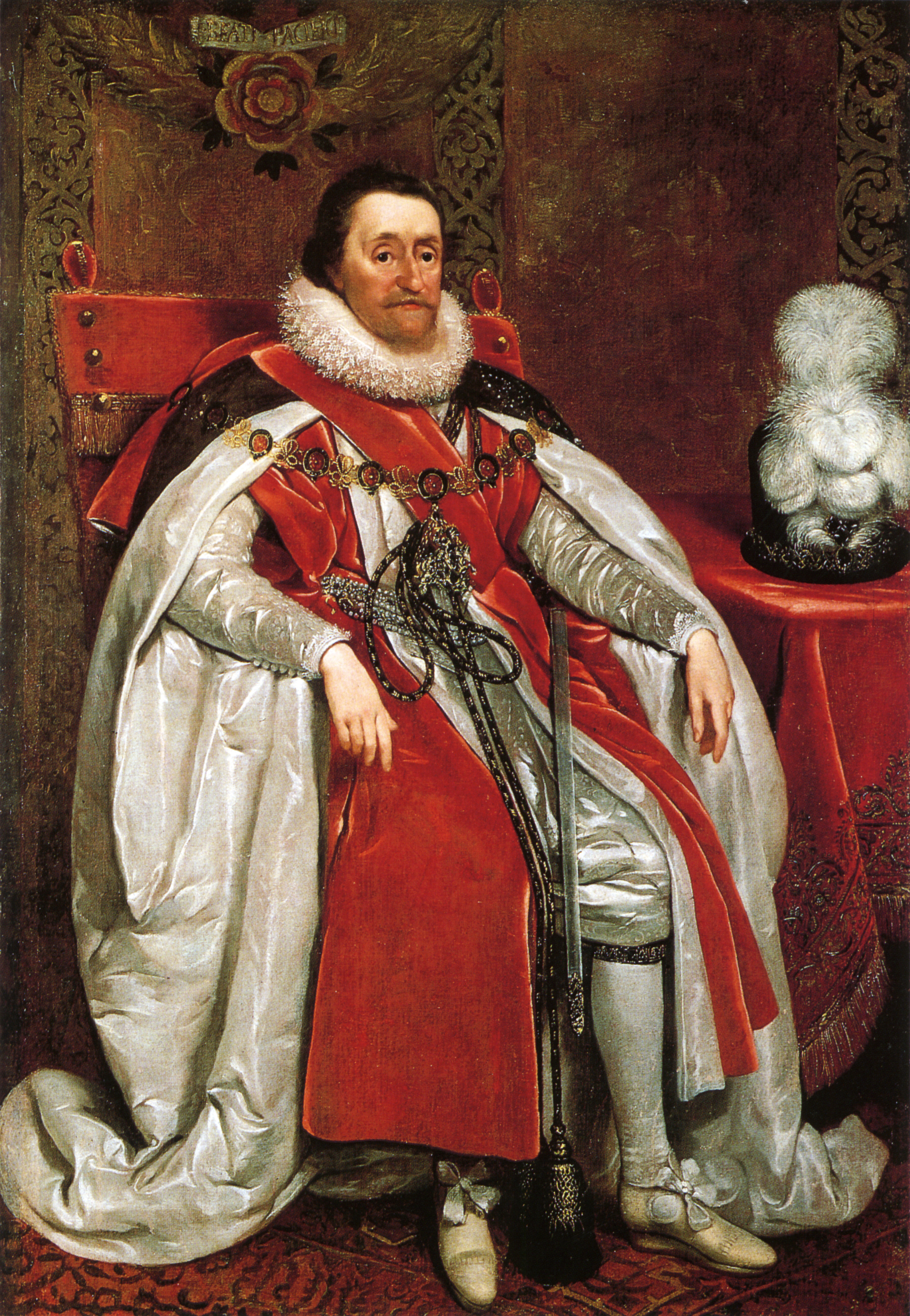
- King James I by Mijtens (1621)
- Monarch: James VI and I

The Jacobean era was the period in English and Scottish history that coincides with the reign of James VI of Scotland, who also inherited the crown of England in 1603 as James I. The Jacobean era succeeds the Elizabethan era and is followed by the Caroline era. The term Jacobean is often used for the distinctive styles of Jacobean architecture, visual arts, decorative arts, and literature which characterized that period.

The word Jacobean is derived from Neo-Latin Jacobaeus from Jacobus, the Ecclesiastical Latin form of the English name James.

== James as King of England ==
The practical if not formal unification of England and Scotland under one ruler was an important shift of order for both nations, and would shape their existence to the present day. Another development of crucial significance was the foundation of the first British colonies on the North American continent; Jamestown, Virginia in 1607, Newfoundland in 1610, and Plymouth Colony in Massachusetts in 1621, which laid the foundation for future British settlement and the eventual formation of both Canada and the United States of America. In 1609 the Parliament of Scotland began the Plantation of Ulster.

A notable event of James' reign occurred on 5 November 1605. On that date, a group of English Catholics (including Guy Fawkes) attempted to assassinate the King and destroy Parliament in the Palace of Westminster. The initial plan consisted of hiding barrels of gunpowder under the parliament building and blowing it up while the house was in session, however, the Gunpowder Plot was exposed and prevented, and the convicted plotters were hanged, drawn, and quartered.

Historians have long debated the curious characteristics of the king's ruling style. Croft says:

The pragmatism of 'little by little' was coming to characterise his style of governance. At the same time, the curious combination of ability and complacency, idleness and shrewd judgement, warm emotions and lack of discretion so well described by Fontenay remained typical of James throughout his life.

=== Royal finances ===
Political events and developments of the Jacobean era cannot be understood separately from the economic and financial situation. James was deeply in debt in Scotland, and after 1603 he inherited an English debt of £350,000 from Elizabeth. By 1608 the English debt had risen to £1,400,000 and was increasing by £140,000 annually. Through a crash program of selling off royal demesnes, Lord Treasurer Robert Cecil reduced the debt to £300,000 and the annual deficit to £46,000 by 1610—but could not follow the same method of relief much farther, especially in light of King James' large spending habits. The result was a series of tense and often failed negotiations with Parliament for financial supports, a situation that deteriorated over the reigns of James and his son and heir Charles I until the crisis of the English Civil War.

The Jacobean era ended with a severe economic depression in 1620–1626, complicated by a serious outbreak of bubonic plague in London in 1625.

=== Foreign policy ===
King James I was sincerely devoted to peace, not just for his three kingdoms but for Europe as a whole. He called himself "Rex Pacificus" ("King of Peace"). Europe was deeply polarized, and on the verge of the massive Thirty Years' War (1618–1648), with the smaller established Protestant states facing the aggression of the larger Catholic empires. In 1604, James made peace with Catholic Spain, and made it his policy to marry his daughter to the Spanish prince. The marriage of James' daughter Princess Elizabeth to Frederick V, Elector Palatine at Whitehall on the 14 February 1613 was more than the social event of the era; the couple's union had important political and military implications. Across Europe, the German princes were banding together in the Union of German Protestant Princes, headquartered in Heidelberg, the capital of the Palatine. King James calculated that his daughter's marriage would give him diplomatic leverage among the Protestants. He thus would have a foot in both camps and be able to broker peaceful settlements. In his naïveté, he did not realize that both sides were playing him as a tool for their own goal of achieving destruction of the other side. The Catholics in Spain, as well as the Emperor Ferdinand II, the Vienna-based leader of the Habsburgs who controlled the Holy Roman Empire, were both heavily influenced by the Catholic Counter-Reformation. They had the goal of expelling Protestantism from their domains.

Lord Buckingham, who wielded increasing influence at court, wanted an alliance with Spain. Buckingham took Charles with him to Spain to woo the princess, the Infanta Maria Anna. However, Spain's terms were that James must drop Britain's anti-Catholic intolerance. Buckingham and Charles were humiliated. Buckingham subsequently became the leader of the widespread British demand for a war against Spain. Meanwhile, the Protestant princes looked to Britain, since it was the strongest of all the Protestant countries, to give military support for their cause. His son-in-law and daughter became king and queen of Bohemia, which outraged Vienna. The Thirty Years' War began as the Habsburg Emperor ousted the new king and queen of Bohemia and massacred their followers. Catholic Bavaria then invaded the Palatine, and James's son-in-law begged for James's military intervention. James finally realized his policies had backfired and refused these pleas. He successfully kept Britain out of the Europe-wide war that proved so devastating for three decades. James's backup plan was to marry his son Charles to a French Catholic princess, who would bring a handsome dowry. Parliament and the British people were strongly opposed to any Catholic marriage, were demanding immediate war with Spain, and strongly favored with the Protestant cause in Europe. James had alienated both elite and popular opinion in Britain, and Parliament was cutting its financing. Historians credit James for pulling back from a major war at the last minute, and keeping Britain in peace.

Frederick and Elizabeth's election as King and Queen of Bohemia in 1619, and the conflict that resulted, marked the beginning of the disastrous Thirty Years' War. King James' determination to avoid involvement in the continental conflict, even during the "war fever" of 1623, appears in retrospect as one of the most significant, and most positive, aspects of his reign.

== High culture ==
=== Literature ===
In literature, some of Shakespeare's most prominent plays, including King Lear (1605), Macbeth (1606), and The Tempest (1610), were written during the reign of James I. Patronage came not just from James, but from James' wife Anne of Denmark. Also during this period were powerful works by John Webster, Thomas Middleton, John Ford and Ben Jonson. Ben Jonson also contributed to some of the era's best poetry, together with the Cavalier poets and John Donne. In prose, the most representative works are found in those of Francis Bacon and the King James Bible.

In 1617 George Chapman completed his monumental translation of Homer's Iliad and Odyssey into English verse, which were the first ever complete translations of either poem, both central to the Western Canon, into the English language. The wildly popular tale of the Trojan War had until then been available to readers of English only in medieval epic retellings such as Caxton's Recuyell of the Historyes of Troye.

Jonson was also an important innovator in the specialised literary subgenre of the masque, which went through an intense development in the Jacobean era. His name is linked with that of Inigo Jones as co-developers of the literary and visual/technical aspects of this hybrid art. (For Jonson's masques, see: The Masque of Blackness, The Masque of Queens, etc.) The high costs of these spectacles, however, positioned the Stuarts far from the relative frugality of Elizabeth's reign, and alienated the middle classes and the Puritans with a prospect of waste and self-indulgent excess.

=== Science ===
Francis Bacon had a strong influence ins era, as the work of Johannes Kepler in Germany and Galileo Galilei in Italy brought the Copernican revolution to a new level of development. Bacon laid a foundation, and was a powerful and persuasive advocate for modern objective inquiry, predicated upon empiricism as a lens to study the natural world. This school of thought was in stark contrast to the dominating scientific philosophy of the time: Medieval scholastic authoritarianism. On practical rather than general levels, much work was being done in the areas of navigation, cartography, and surveying—John Widdowes' A Description of the World (1621) being one significant volume in this area—as well as in continuing William Gilbert's work on magnetism from the previous reign. Scholarship and the sciences, or "natural philosophy", had important royal patrons in this era—not so much in the King but in his son, Henry Frederick, Prince of Wales, and even his wife, Anne of Denmark.

=== Arts and architecture ===
The fine arts were dominated by foreign talent in the Jacobean era, as was true of the Tudor and Stuart periods in general. Paul van Somer and Daniel Mytens were the most prominent portrait painters during the reign of James, as Anthony van Dyck would be under the coming reign of his son. Yet the slow development of a native school of painting, which had made progress in the previous reign, continued under James, producing figures like Robert Peake the Elder (died 1619), William Larkin (fl. 1609–19), and Sir Nathaniel Bacon (1585–1627). Some would also claim, as part of this trend, Cornelius Johnson, or Cornelis Janssens van Ceulen (1593–1661), born and trained in London and active through the first two Stuart reigns.

The decorative arts – furniture, for example – became increasingly rich in color, detail, and design. Materials from other parts of the world, like mother-of-pearl, were now available by worldwide trade and were used as decoration. Even familiar materials, such as wood and silver, were worked more deeply in intricate and intensely three-dimensional designs. The goldsmith George Heriot made jewellery for Anne of Denmark.

Architecture in the Jacobean era was a continuation of the Elizabethan style with increasing emphasis on classical elements like columns and obelisks. Architectural detail and decorative strapwork patterns derived from continental engravings, especially the prints of Hans Vredeman de Vries, were employed on buildings and furniture. European influences include France, Flanders, and Italy. Inigo Jones may be the most famous English architect of this period, with lasting contributions to classical public building style; his works include the Banqueting House in the Palace of Whitehall and the portico of Old St Paul's Cathedral (destroyed in the Great Fire of London). Significant Jacobean buildings include Hatfield House, Bolsover Castle, Aston Hall, and Charlton House. Many churches contain fine monuments in Jacobean style, with characteristic motifs including strapwork, and polychromy. The mason and sculptor Nicholas Stone produced many effigies for tombs as well as architectural stonework.

== In popular culture ==
In the domain of customs, manners, and everyday life, the Jacobean era saw a distinctly religious tone. Virginia tobacco became popular. James I published his A Counterblaste to Tobacco in 1604, but the book had no discernible effect; by 1612, London had 7,000 tobacconists and smoking houses. The Virginia colony survived because the English acquired the nicotine habit.

== See also ==
- Early modern Britain

== Sources ==
- Anderson, Roberta. "'Well Disposed to the Affairs of Spain?’ James VI & I and the Propagandists: 1618–1624." British Catholic History 25.4 (2001): 613–635.
- Burgess, Glenn, Rowland Wymer, and Jason Lawrence, eds. The Accession of James I: historical and cultural consequences (Springer, 2016).
- Coward, Barry. The Stuart Age: England, 1603–1714 (4th ed. 2014) excerpt
- Croft, Pauline King James (Palgrave Macmillan, 2003)
- Davies, Godfrey The Early Stuarts: 1603–1660 (2nd ed 1959), pp 1–80.
- Fincham, Kenneth, and Peter Lake. "The ecclesiastical policy of King James I." Journal of British Studies 24.2 (1985): 169–207.
- Fischlin, Daniel and Mark Fortier, eds. Royal Subjects: Essays on the Writings of James VI and I (2002)
- Fraser, Antonia. The gunpowder plot: Terror and faith in 1605 (Hachette UK, 2010).
- Gardiner, S.R. "Britain under James I" in The Cambridge Modern History (1907) v 3 ch 17 online
- Houlbrooke, Ralph Anthony, ed. James VI and I: Ideas, Authority, and Government (Ashgate, 2006).
- Howat, G.M.D. Stuart and Cromwellian Foreign Policy (1974)
- Houston, S. J. James I (Routledge, 2014).
- Lee, Maurice. Great Britain's Solomon: James VI and I in his three kingdoms (U of Illinois Press, 1990).
- Lindquist, Eric N. "The Last Years of the First Earl of Salisbury, 1610–1612." Albion 18.1 (1986): 23–41.
- Lockyer, Roger. James VI and I (1998).
- Lockyer, Roger. Tudor and Stuart Britain: 1485–1714 (3rd ed. 2004), 576 pp excerpt
- Perry, Curtis. The Making of Jacobean Culture: James I and the Renegotiation of Elizabethan Literary Practice (Cambridge UP, 1997).
- Stilma, Astrid. A King Translated: The Writings of King James VI & I and their Interpretation in the Low Countries, 1593–1603 (Routledge, 2016).
- Waurechen, Sarah. "Imagined Polities, Failed Dreams, and the Beginnings of an Unacknowledged Britain: English Responses to James VI and I's Vision of Perfect Union." Journal of British Studies 52.3 (2013): 575–596.
- Wormald, Jenny. "James VI and I (1566–1625)", Oxford Dictionary of National Biography (2004) doi:10.1093/ref:odnb/14592

=== Historiography ===
- Coward, Barry ed., A Companion to Stuart Britain
- Lee, Maurice. "James I and the Historians: Not a Bad King After All?." Albion 16.2 (1984): 151–163.
- Schwarz, Marc L. "James I and the Historians: Toward a Reconsideration." Journal of British Studies 13.2 (1974): 114–134. in JSTOR
- Underdown, David. "New ways and old in early Stuart history," in Richard Schlatter, ed., Recent views on British history: essays on historical writing since 1966 (Rutgers UP, 1984), pp 99–140.
- Wormald, Jenny. "James VI and I: Two Kings or One?" History 68#223 (1983), 187–209.
- Young, Michael B. "James VI and I: Time for a Reconsideration?" Journal of British Studies 51.3 (2012): 540–567.

=== Primary sources ===
- Akrigg, G. P. V., ed. Letters of King James VI & I (U of California Press, 1984).
- Coward, Barry and Peter Gaunt, eds. English Historical Documents, 1603–1660 (2011).
- Rhodes, Neil; Richards, Jennifer; Marshall, Joseph, eds. King James VI and I: Selected Writings (Ashgate, 2003).
