= Worcester House, London =

Demolished mansion in London

Coordinates: 51.510387°N 0.120498°W

c. 1630 etching of three of the mansions on the Strand, from left to right are Durham House, Salisbury House and Worcester House

Worcester House was one of the many mansions that lined the Strand in London until it was demolished around 1694. It stood on a site now occupied by the Savoy Hotel and theatre.

== History ==
The street, and particularly the southern side allowing lands backing onto the River Thames was a popular place for those in high positions to set up their houses, and therefore a centre of power for centuries, until its decline following the English Civil War.

Worcester House was first built for the Bishop of Carlisle in the Middle Ages, but after the reformation was presented by Henry VIII to the John Russell, 1st Earl of Bedford. It was known for some time as Bedford House or Russell House. The Russell acquired a piece of land to the north of the Strand in 1552, with Edward Russell, 3rd Earl of Bedford building a new house which adopted the name Bedford House. The older house was then occupied by Edward Somerset, 2nd Marquess of Worcester who gave his title to the house. It was used during the Commonwealth for a number of committees. Following the Stuart Restoration, the Marquess of Worcester allowed Edward Hyde, 1st Earl Clarendon to live there, and in 1660 Clarendon's daughter Anne Hyde was secretly married to James II, then the Duke of York. After six years living there Lord Clarendon was able to move to his newly completed Clarendon House on Piccadilly. The house was then largely unoccupied and used mostly for events and receptions including James Butler, 1st Duke of Ormond as Chancellor of the University of Oxford in 1669 and James Scott, 1st Duke of Monmouth as Chancellor of the University of Cambridge in 1674. The house was demolished some time in the late 17th century. By 1720, John Strype recorded that it a number of tenements occupied the site. The house is mentioned in the writings of Samuel Pepys and Andrew Marvell.

== See also ==
- Bedford House
