= Robert Stickells =

English architect and clerk of works

Robert Stickells or Stickles (died 1620) was an English architect and clerk of works.

== Career ==
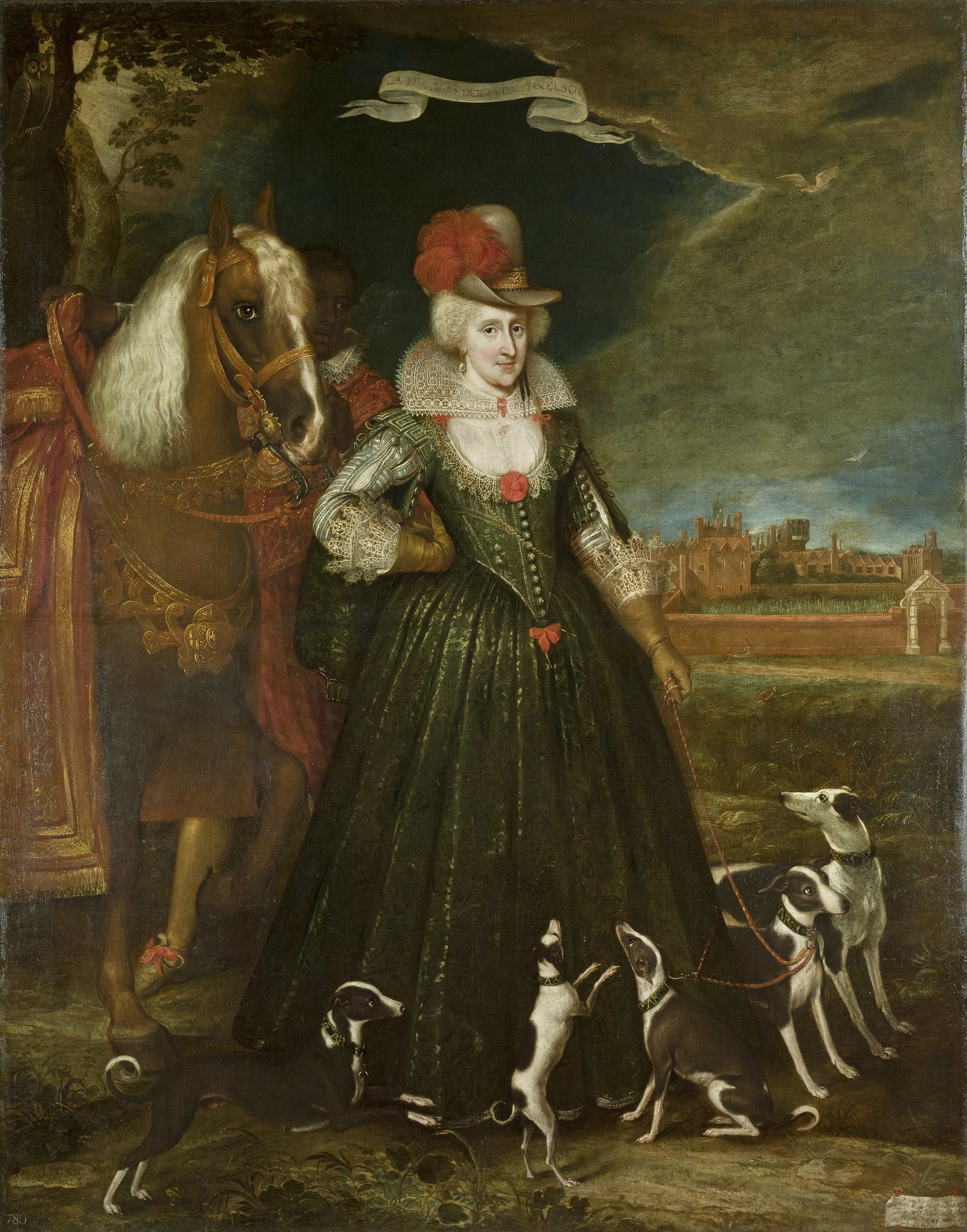
Walls and a gate built by Stickells appear in the background of the portrait of Anne of Denmark and her African servant at Oatlands

Stickells was first recorded working to clear obstacles from the harbour at Dover. In 1591 he supervised the panelling of Grocer's Hall in London. He became clerk of works at Richmond Palace. In 1597 Stickells made some memoranda and sketches referring to the contrast between ideas of Vitruvius and Gothic architecture, antique and the modern. He is thought to have been involved in the construction of Lyveden New Bield from 1604, and made a drawing for the lantern roof.

James VI and I began building a new Banqueting House at Whitehall Palace in 1607, probably designed by Robert Stickells. A model for the roof was made by a Scottish designer, James Acheson. William Portington was the carpenter, and Peter Street made a special augur to hollow out the columns. King James visited the construction site in September 1607 and, according to John Chamberlain, was displeased with the placing of pillars which obscured the windows. The building was used for court masques but burnt down in 1619. Chamberlain's letter ambiguously refers to a "Lord Architect", and architectural historians conclude that Stickells or another draughtsman George Weale were responsible for the design.

Stickells supervised masons working for Anna of Denmark at Oatlands Palace in 1617, interpreting the designs of Inigo Jones for walls and an external gate by "setting out the works for masons".

Stickells made a will before his death in 1620, as a mason resident in Southwark St Olave.
