= Lucy Russell, Countess of Bedford =

Patron of the arts and literature in the Elizabethan and Jacobean periods

Lucy Russell
- Countess of Bedford
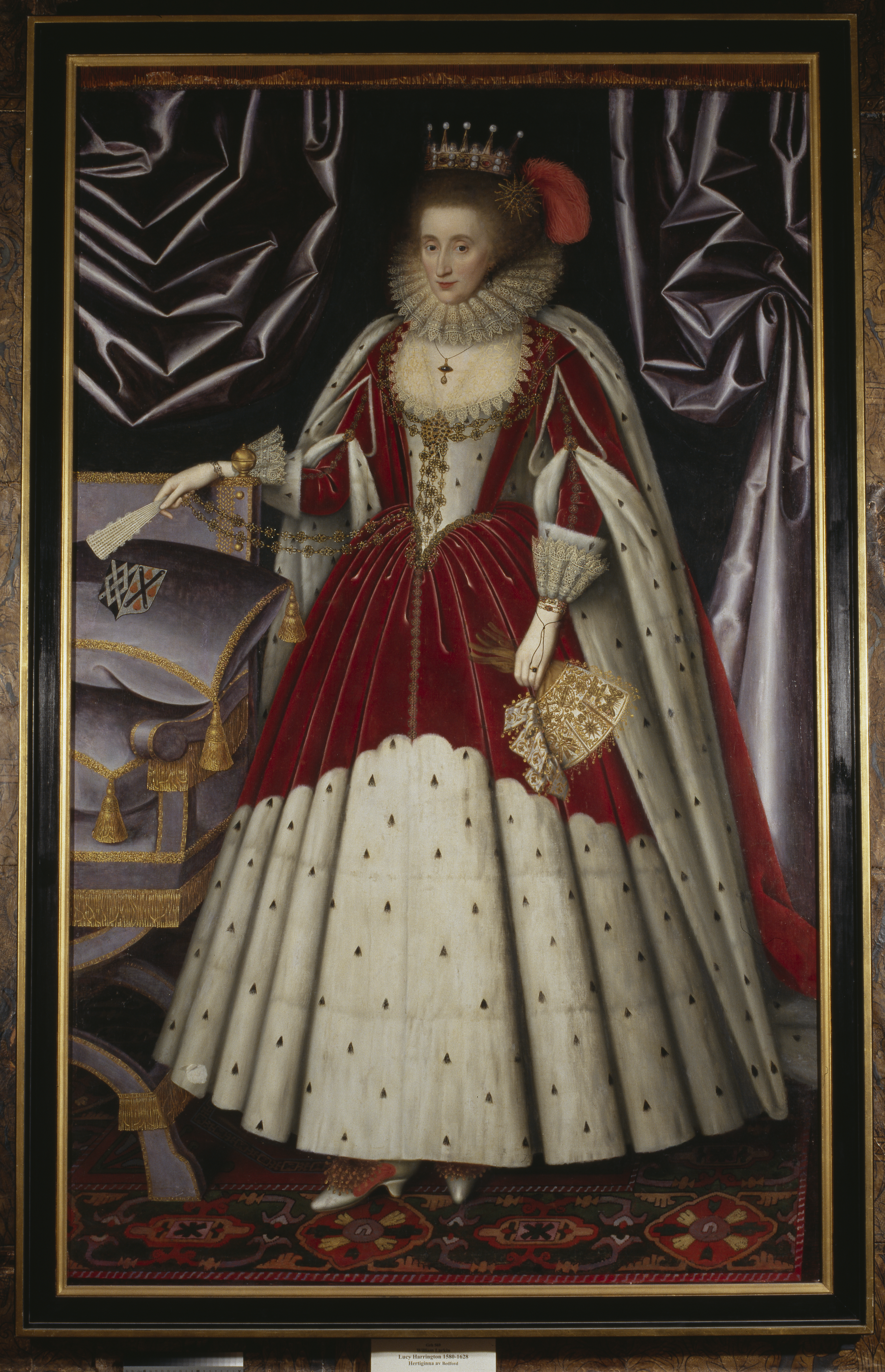
- Born: Lucy Harington; 1581
- Died: 1627 (aged 45–46)
- Noble family: Harington
- Spouse: Edward Russell, 3rd Earl of Bedford
- Father: John Harington, 1st Baron Harington of Exton
- Mother: Anne Keilway
- Occupation: Lady of the Bedchamber to Anne of Denmark

Lucy Russell, Countess of Bedford (née Harington; 1581–1627) was a major aristocratic patron of the arts and literature in the Elizabethan and Jacobean eras, the primary non-royal performer in contemporary court masques, a letter-writer, and a poet. She was an adventurer (shareholder) in the Somers Isles Company, investing in Bermuda, where Harrington Sound is named after her.

== Parentage and marriage ==
Lucy Harington was the daughter of Sir John Harington of Exton, and Anne Keilway. Although the exact date of her birth is unknown, she was christened on 25 January 1581. She was well-educated for a woman in her era, and knew French, Spanish, and Italian. She was a member of the Sidney/Essex circle from birth, through her father, first cousin to Sir Robert Sidney and Mary, Countess of Pembroke; she was a close friend of Essex's sisters Penelope Rich and Dorothy Percy, Countess of Northumberland, and the latter named one of her daughters Lucy after her.

Lucy Harington married Edward Russell, 3rd Earl of Bedford, on 12 December 1594, when she was thirteen years old and he was twenty-two, at St Dunstan's on Stepney Green. She miscarried her first child in February 1596 at Bedford House on the Strand in London.

== Courting Anne of Denmark ==
Lucy and the Earl seem to have been expected to visit Berwick-upon-Tweed and Scotland in August 1600. The Earl of Bedford got himself into serious trouble in 1601 when he rode with the Earl of Essex in rebellion against Queen Elizabeth. The Bedford fortunes revived after the death of Elizabeth I and the Union of the Crowns in 1603, when the reign of James I began.

Several English nobles secretly sent representatives into Scotland to try to gain favour and court appointments. The Countess of Bedford audaciously skipped the late queen's funeral and rode hard to the Scottish border, ahead of a party of gentlewomen appointed by the privy council, and got an audience in Scotland with the new king's wife Anne of Denmark. Anne made Bedford a Lady of the Bedchamber and she became a trusted confidant. The queen came from Stirling Castle to Holyrood Palace with a convoy of English ladies who had come seeking attendance and on 31 May 1603 attended church in Edinburgh accompanied by these would-be companions. Some of the ladies stayed at John Kinloch's house in Edinburgh.

The Countess of Bedford travelled south with Anne of Denmark and Prince Henry and Princess Elizabeth. There were now a great number of English ladies following the queen. At Dingley, Northamptonshire she rode south to meet Lady Anne Clifford, perhaps at Wymondley Priory, and brought her to Dingley on 24 June.

The French ambassador the Marquis de Rosny identified the Countess of Bedford as an influential courtier, and gave her a gold watch set with diamonds. John Coke wrote in 1604 that the "Lady Bedford keepeth her prerogative of greatness at court".

== Masquing ==
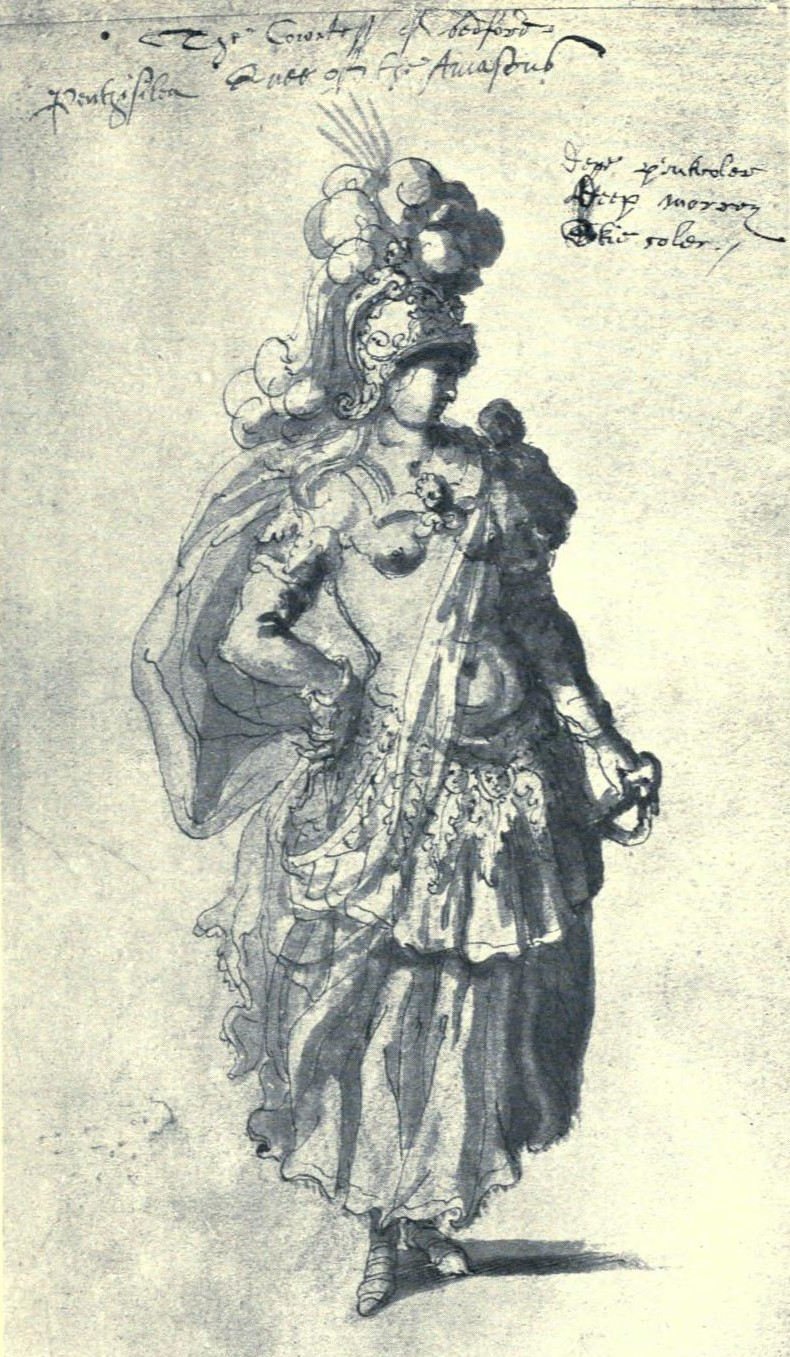
Drawing for the costume of Penthesilea for the Countess of Bedford by Inigo Jones.

Bedford performed in several of the masques staged at court, including The Masque of Blackness (1605), Hymenaei (1606), The Masque of Beauty (1608), The Masque of Queens, and The Vision of the Twelve Goddesses (1604). On two occasions she functioned as a theatrical producer, described as rector chori of the New Year masque in 1604, The Vision of the Twelve Goddesses, and in 1617 instigating and organising the performance of Robert White's masque Cupid's Banishment, acted by students from the first English girls' school, the Ladies Hall in Deptford. In February 1617 the masque by Ben Jonson presented by Lord Hay to the French ambassador Baron de Tour, the Lovers Made Men, was staged by the Countess of Bedford.

A drawing for her costume as Penthesilea in the Masque of Queens by Inigo Jones survives in the collection at Chatsworth House. She attended a masque produced by the Earl of Montgomery at Elsyng Palace (Enfield) in December 1618, performed by male courtiers. The theme was a country wedding and George Goring played a farmer's son. According to Gerard Herbert, the masque was performed again at Theobald for King James.

== Patronage ==
Jonson
She was a noted patron of Ben Jonson, who dedicated his play Cynthia's Revels (1600) to her and addressed several of his Epigrams to her, extolling her patronage. By his own admission, Jonson portrayed her as Ethra in his lost pastoral, The May Lord – though he may also have depicted her as Lady Haughty, president of the Collegiates in Epicene (1609). When Jonson was imprisoned in 1605 for his role in the Eastward Ho scandal, he wrote a letter to an unknown lady, who is thought by some scholars to have been the Countess of Bedford.

Others
In addition to Jonson, Bedford supported other significant poets of her era, including Michael Drayton, Samuel Daniel, George Chapman, and John Donne. She might be the "Idea" of Drayton's pastoral Idea: The Shepherd's Garland (1593) and of his sonnet sequence Idea's Mirror (1594). Drayton dedicated his Mortimeriados (1594) to her, as Daniel did his Vision of the Twelve Goddesses (1604). Bedford patronised a range of lesser writers of her era, including the translator John Florio, who credited her help in his translation of the essays of Montaigne. She "received more dedications than any other woman associated with the drama" in her era.

Bedford was the godmother of Donne's second daughter, also named Lucy, and the namesake of Sir Henry Goodere's daughter (later wife of Sir Francis Nethersole). Donne seems to have been deeply involved with her on a psychological level – "Most of the poems of Donne's middle years relate, in one way or another, to this glamorous and intriguing woman." Her contradictions could be provocative: the Countess was a dedicated Calvinist, and supported many Calvinist authors and thinkers – yet she allegedly performed bare-breasted in Court masques. Her relationships with some of her poets, including Donne and Drayton, were sometimes uneven; poets who dedicated their works to her could also complain of the loss of her favour.

She was also receptive to women poets, such as her cousin Cecily Bulstrode. Bedford occasionally wrote poems herself, including a poem Donne claims he saw in the garden of her Twickenham estate. Only one of her poems is extant, "Death be not proud, thy hand gave not this blow", an epitaph on Bulstrode. This poem has been attributed to Donne, and suggestively shares an opening clause with his Holy Sonnet X; nevertheless, it is now considered much more likely to be Bedford's poem. The elegy has an image of Bulstrode's breast as a crystal palace and the repository of her soul, clearer than the crystal;

From out the Christall Pallace of her brest
The clearer soule was call'd to endlesse rest.

Bedford certainly wrote an elegy on the death of her cousin Bridget Markham at Twickenham Park in 1609.

While best remembered for her patronage of writers, Bedford also supported musicians, John Dowland being a noteworthy example. She is the dedicatee of Dowland's Second Book of Songs (1600).

A few scholars have identified the Earl and Countess of Bedford as the allegorised couple in Shakespeare's The Phoenix and the Turtle, who left "no posterity" (line 59) – yet since the poem was published in 1601, when the Countess was only twenty years old, the identification has struck others as unlikely.

Gardens
She was a significant figure in the development of English country-house and garden design, centering on her estates at Twickenham Park and Moor Park. An Italian writer Giacomo Castelvetro dedicated a book on fruit and vegetables to her. She described her building and improvements at Moor Park in a letter to a friend; "my works att the More, whear I have been a patcher this sommer and I am still adding some trifles of pleasure to that place I am so much love with, as I were so fond of any man I were in hard case."

Art collection
By 1618, the Countess of Bedford had become interested in collecting early Tudor art. She believed that portraits by Hans Holbein the Younger could be found in obscure country houses. She wrote to her friend in Suffolk, Lady Jane Cornwallis (wife of the artist Nathaniel Bacon), hoping that her father-in-law, Nicholas Bacon of Redgrave might have such pictures. She would pay handsomely, and offered to have faithful copies made as substitutes for the originals. Thomas Howard, 14th Earl of Arundel was a competitor for old paintings. At this time, the artists Nicholas Hilliard, Daniël Mijtens and Rowland Lockey made copies or replicas of old portraits. Bedford was patron of Mijtens.

== Career ==
As one of the most influential women at James's court, she was also involved in a range of political issues; in the later part of the reign she was among the most prominent supporters of Elizabeth of Bohemia, who had been brought up in her father's household at Coombe Abbey.

Bedford took part in the Masque of Blackness on 6 January 1605 as "Aglaia" one of the three graces. The masque marked the creation of Prince Charles as Duke of York. Bedford probably arranged the marriage of her cousin Mary Sutton Dudley to the Scottish Earl of Home. Their wedding in July 1605 was held at Bedford House in the Strand, and was part of a move to Anglicize the Scottish aristocracy.

She was apparently absent from the queen's company for a part of 1605 and 1606, around the time Anne of Denmark had her last daughter Sophia, and had perhaps been sent away in disfavour. When Anne of Denmark asked her to come back, and Bedford danced for her, according to Dudley Carleton the queen laughed and said, "her brother of Denmark was as handsome a man as the duke of Holstein". The remark may mean that Bedford had been involved with the Duke of Holstein, the queen's younger brother who had recently been in England.

John Chamberlain noted that she had a miscarriage in September 1611 and was Anne of Denmark's "only favourite". In 1611, she was involved in a scheme to bring a French woman, Madame Furatta, to London to set up the manufacture of silver and gold thread for embroidery. Five men established a business and obtained a royal patent, which drew opposition from the Goldsmith's Company.

Her husband, the Earl of Bedford fell from his horse in July 1613 and was seriously injured. The Countess gave up a plan to travel to Spa, Belgium for her health. John Chamberlain wrote that she came back to the royal court, but affected by grief she used less cosmetics than the other women at court, "Marry, she is somewhat reformed in her attire, and forebears painting, which they say makes her somewhat strange among so many vizards, which together with their frizzled powdered hair makes them look all alike, so you can scant know one from another at first view."

In August 1616 she was with the court at Woodstock Palace, the only countess present, when George Villiers was created Viscount Buckingham. She visited Anne of Denmark at Nonsuch Palace in July 1617. In 1617 she was godmother of Elizabeth Gordon, daughter of Sir Robert Gordon of Gordonstoun and Louisa Gordon whose mother Geneviève Petau de Maulette is said to have taught French to Elizabeth of Bohemia. The other godparents were the Earl of Hertford and Jean Drummond, Countess of Roxburghe.

Roxburghe was dismissed from the queen's court soon after this christening, and Bedford seems to have absented herself at this time in sympathy with her friend. She wrote to her friend Lady Cornwallis that Roxburghe's absence in Scotland "makes me perfectly hate the court".

Anne of Denmark had a nosebleed at Oatlands in September 1618 that confined her to bed and disrupted her travel plans. Bedford thought it had weakened her, and she appeared "dangerously ill". Bedford wrote to Lady Cornwallis that she would now be more often at court because of the queen's illness than she had intended.

Prominent as she was, both Bedford and her husband had serious financial problems throughout their lives. In 1618 she transferred her shares in the Bermuda Company to the Marquess of Hamilton. Lady Bedford reportedly had debts of £50,000 in 1619, apart from the Earl's massive indebtedness, and despite a royal grant of duties from sea coal, made plans to sell lands inherited from her father and brother, including Coombe Abbey.

The court physician Théodore de Mayerne noted she had "podagra" or gout. In 1619 he treated her for the smallpox that blinded her in one eye, and gave her a prescription to treat the scarring on her face. In 1620, he treated her for depression which he recorded as "hypochondriacus".

Lucy, Countess of Bedford died in the same month as her husband, May 1627. None of their children survived infancy.

== Portrait medal ==
Around the year 1625, Lady Bedford commissioned a portrait medal from Nicholas Briot. The oval medal show her in profile wearing a coronet and a feathered aigrette jewel. The reverse has a snake catching its tail or protecting its head, an "ouroboros". Bedford may have been introduced to Briot by the royal physician Theodore Turquet de Mayerne. A silver example of the medal came to light in 1981 and is held by the Fitzwilliam Museum, Cambridge.

== In fiction ==
- Lucy Russell is the subject of The Noble Assassin (2011), a historical novel by Christie Dickason.
- Vivian Bearing refers to herself as Lucy, Countess of Bedford on one occasion in Margaret Edson's play Wit.
