= Bedford House, Strand =

Former London aristocratic townhouse

Coordinates: 51.511°N 0.122°W

Bedford House also called Russell House was the Elizabethan and Jacobean London home of the Russell family, Earls of Bedford, situated on the site of the present Southampton Street on the north side of the Strand. It was demolished in 1704 after the family had relocated to Bloomsbury.

== Origins ==
The site was on or adjacent to the lodging or Inn of the Bishops of Carlisle on the south side of the Strand. John Russell, 1st Earl of Bedford acquired the land, Longacre, in May 1552 at the fall of Protector Somerset. The Russell family already had a house on the south side of the Strand, with land running down to the Thames near Ivybridge Street. This property passed to Bridget Hussey, the widow of Francis Russell, 2nd Earl of Bedford, and was sold to Edward Somerset, 2nd Marquess of Worcester after which it came to be named as Worcester House. Bedford House was built in the years before 1590 for the young Edward Russell, 3rd Earl of Bedford, and wife, Lucy, Russell, Countess of Bedford. Only small dwellings and stables are known to have existed on the site previously.

== Architecture ==
The house on the north side of the Strand was constructed of timber, perhaps by Edward Russell, 3rd Earl of Bedford directed by his aunt and guardian Anne Russell, Countess of Warwick, in the early 1590s. Anne Russell made over household goods and "all manner of implements" at Bedford House the young earl in 1593. Sir Robert Cecil built Cecil House (or Salisbury House) next door.

There was a forecourt on the Strand for arriving coaches. The garden had a brick wall with a terrace walk, and a "wilderness".

The main reception rooms of the house included a gallery known as the terrace room overlooking the walk, and another long gallery faced the forecourt and the Strand. The servants were lodged in rooms in the top floor. There were summer houses with domed roofs for banquetting in the garden.

== Residents ==
According to Lady Anne Clifford, Ambrose Dudley, 3rd Earl of Warwick died at Bedford House in 1590. Her father, George Clifford, 3rd Earl of Cumberland, was staying at the house at this time.

Lucy Russell, Countess of Bedford sometimes used Bedford House, and the marriage of her cousin Mary Sutton Dudley to the Scottish Earl of Home was held there on 11 July 1605. In 1616 the Countess of Bedford stayed at Bedford House because it was conveniently near to Whitehall Palace, where she could attend on Anne of Denmark.

Lucy, Countess of Bedford, frequently resided at another London residence, Harington House in Bishopsgate. Lady Bedford had another London residence, Fisher's Folly, which was known as Harington House after 1616. She also had a lodging at the royal palaces where the queen resided.

In April 1619 Lady Bedford stayed at Bedford House while the ladies in waiting watched the body of Anne of Denmark at Somerset House. Later in that year, she transferred much of the Russell estate to the heir Francis Russell, but reserving her and her husband's right to reside in Bedford House. She let the house to Francis Manners, 6th Earl of Rutland in 1623. In the 1620s, Bedford House was let to the Earl and Countess of Rutland.

In 1628, Francis Russell, now 4th Earl of Bedford, ordered a statue of an old woman holding a cat as a garden ornament, and new chimney pieces for the house. In 1641 he kept a gilded barge with bargemen dressed in his livery on the Thames at nearby Rayner's Yard. The Earl was declared a delinquent in October 1643 and his furniture and tapestries were confiscated from Bedford House.
