= William Portington =

English carpenter and joiner (1544–1629)

William Portington (1544–1629) was an English carpenter and joiner, originally from St Albans, employed by Elizabeth I and James VI and I. He was master carpenter of the Office of Works.

== Career and works ==
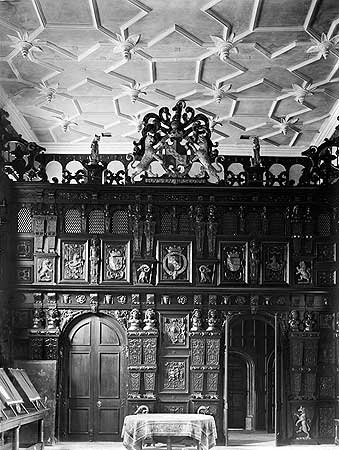
Portington may have designed and constructed the hall screen at Knole

Portington was employed by Sir Nicholas Bacon, the Lord Keeper, for his buildings on Fetter Lane. Sir Nathaniel Bacon of Stiffkey and Sir Nicholas Bacon of Redgrave paid him £20 in May 1579.

Portington was employed in April and May 1603 during preparations for the coronation of King James and other ceremonies, supervised by Simon Basil and William Spicer. His account survives in the library of the University of Edinburgh. He repaired and altered the privy lodgings at the Tower of London and built new sheds for the kitchen and a pump to bring water from the Thames to the kitchen cistern. He repaired the "standard" or fountain at Westminster Palace.

Portington worked for Robert Cecil at his London house in the Strand, and is thought to have made the Great Hall screen at Knole for Thomas Sackville, 1st Earl of Dorset.

He made masque scenery including the temple and rock for The Vision of the Twelve Goddesses performed in January 1604, and The Masque of Beauty of January 1608. He provided the shelving in Anne of Denmark's silkworm house.

In 1607, Portington was involved in the construction of a new Banqueting House for Whitehall Palace. The building was probably designed by Robert Stickells. James Acheson made an architectural model for the roof, and Peter Street made a special augur to hollow out columns.

He built the "hearse" or catafalque in Westminster Abbey for the funeral of Prince Henry in 1612. The hearse was painted by John de Critz. Portington and Inigo Jones constructed stands for the arraignment of the Earl of Somerset at Westminster Hall in 1616.

Portington owned a house in St Martin's Lane, which he let to the crown for the use of the painter Daniël Mijtens.

His portrait was given to the London Company of Ironmongers by Matthew Bankes (a former apprentice) in 1637. The picture shows him with dividers and compass.
