= Zachary Bethell =

English courtier and administrator

- Born: England
- Died: 1635; England
- Occupations: Courtier, usher, royal wardrobe administrator
- Spouse: Susan
- Children: 1+

Zachary Bethell (died 1635) was an English courtier, an usher, and administrator in the wardrobes of Anne of Denmark and Henrietta Maria.

== Career ==
He was a grandson of Richard Bethell, a mayor of Winchester. Zachary Bethell was a steward for the William Paulet, 4th Marquess of Winchester at Basing House in 1602. He became a gentleman usher, daily waiter usher and a gentlemen of the robes in the royal wardrobe. One list of the queen's household calls him the "surveyor of her majesties robes". He bought his place from a Mr Izard. Bethell kept an account book (which is not known to survive). In 1640 Katherine Lisle sought an old debt to her grandfather, Edward Barnes, a silkman who had supplied Anne of Denmark. William Juxon observed that a part of the sum claimed was recorded as paid in Mr Bethell's book of "Queen Anne's Robes".

Bethell, Richard Lazonby (master of the lime-hounds), and Christopher Hammond, as faithful royal servants, successfully petitioned for the forfeited property of Catholic recusants to augment their income in May 1605.

Elizabeth Sidney, Countess of Rutland, paid Bethell a contribution towards the cost of the masque Hymenaei in January 1606, and also contributed to the costs of her costume. Bethell was involved in preparations for masques and entertainments, particularly at Greenwich Palace, and at Somerset House, where he prepared a space for Anne of Denmark to practice her dance for The Masque of Beauty. Bethell received money for the masque costumes.

Bethell seems to have been a conduit for Anne of Denmark's patronage. A letter from Stephen Proctor to Bethell mentions his hopes for a meeting with the queen. Bethell became Keeper of Somerset House, which he called "Denmark House" in his will. An 1610 account for building work there mentions "Mr Bethell's lodginge".

In November 1616, Bethell was paid for arranging a performance including an acrobat dancing on a rope in the council chamber at Greenwich. An account made in September 1616 includes a payment of £568 to Andrew Kerwyn made by Bethell for works at Somerset House. The financial transactions seem to have contributed to a controversy among the officials of the royal works, which, according to John Webb, involved Inigo Jones.

After the death of Anne of Denmark, he walked in her funeral procession with the usher John Tunstall. Inventories note some items of her clothing and linen in his keeping. He signed bills for the masque Chloridia, included payment for copper lace to two "maskinge suttes for Jefferye" (Jeffrey Hudson) supplied by Benjamin Henshawe. By 1637 he was replaced as surveyor of the robes of Henrietta Maria by Mr White.

Bethell had a house close to St Giles in the Fields and was a neighbour of the queen's silkwoman Dorothy Speckard.

He died in 1635 and was survived by his wife Susan, and his son William Bethell, whom he disowned as a spendthrift with a bequest of 20 shillings.
