= Banqueting House =

Former palace banqueting rooms, later chapel of Whitehall in London, England

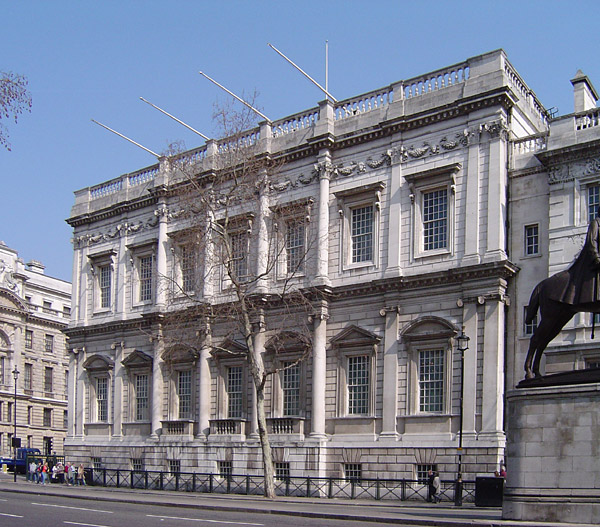
- Whitehall façade

- Location within Central London
- 51°30′16″N 0°07′32″W
- Type: Banqueting house
- Location: Whitehall, Westminster

History
- Built: 1622

Site notes
- Architect: Inigo Jones
- Architectural style: Palladian
- Governing body: Historic Royal Palaces

Listed Building – Grade I
- Official name: Banqueting House
- Designated: 1 December 1987
- Reference no.: 1357353

The Banqueting House, on Whitehall in the City of Westminster, central London, is the grandest and best-known survivor of the architectural genre of banqueting houses, constructed for elaborate entertaining. It is the only large surviving component of the Palace of Whitehall, the residence of English monarchs from 1530 to 1698. The building is important in the history of English architecture as the first structure to be completed in the classical style of Palladian architecture which was to transform English architecture.

Begun in 1619 and designed by Inigo Jones in a style influenced by Andrea Palladio, the Banqueting House was completed in 1622 at a cost of £15,618. In the 1630s, paintings by Peter Paul Rubens were added to the interior ceiling. The building was controversially re-faced in Portland stone in the 19th century, though the details of the original façade were faithfully preserved. Today, the Banqueting House is a national monument, open to the public and preserved as a Grade I listed building. It is cared for by an independent charity, Historic Royal Palaces, which receives no funding from the British Government or the Crown.

== History ==
The Palace of Whitehall was the creation of Henry VIII, expanding an earlier mansion that had belonged to Cardinal Thomas Wolsey, known as York Place. The expansion was possible largely through the theft of white Normandy marble from an educational college Wolsey had planned for his home town of Ipswich, intended as a feeder to what would become Christ Church, Oxford.

The King was determined that his new palace should be the "biggest palace in Christendom", a place befitting his newly created status as the Supreme Head of the Church of England. All evidence of the disgraced Wolsey was eliminated and the building rechristened the Palace of Whitehall.

During Henry's reign, the palace had no designated banqueting house, the King preferring to banquet in a temporary structure purpose-built in the gardens. The Keeper of the Banqueting House was a position enhanced by Mary I by designating it in relation to a building of the same name at a different palace, Nonsuch Palace, near the south edge of Greater London, which no longer exists.

== The Elizabethan banqueting house ==
A more permanent Banqueting house was built at Whitehall in 1581, costing £1,744-19 shillings. Raphael Holinshed described the building, with its timbered structure covered with canvas painted in imitation of stone, and a painted ceiling including the Queen's devices and heraldry. The new building was intended as the venue for entertaining Francis, Duke of Anjou and Alençon. In subsequent years, the decorative scheme was enhanced by the painters George Gower and Lewis Lizard.

The ceiling of this Elizabethan banqueting house, inherited by James I at the Union of the Crowns, was painted with clouds by Leonard Fryer in 1604. Shakespeare's play Othello was performed in the Banqueting House on 1 November 1605 by the King's Men. One of the last functions in this structure was a banquet for the Prince of Joinville in June 1607, for which new linen was bought to dress the two cupboards of estate.

== The first Jacobean banqueting house at Whitehall ==
James I began building a new banqueting house in 1607, which was destined to only have a short life. The building was probably designed by Robert Stickells. A "geometrical model" for the roof was made by a Scottish designer, James Acheson. William Portington was the carpenter, and Peter Street made a special auger to hollow out the columns. The interior was painted and gilded by John de Critz. King James visited the construction site in September 1607 and was displeased with the placing of pillars which obscured the windows. A Venetian diplomat, Orazio Busino, praised the proportions of the space, and the decoration and carving of the wooden columns (in two Classical orders) which supported viewing galleries on three sides.

The new banqueting house was the venue for The Masque of Beauty in January 1608. King James told the Venetian ambassador Zorzi Giustinian that the masque consecrated the rebirth of the Banqueting House in stone, which his "predecessors had left him merely built in wood". Giustinian wrote that "the apparatus and the cunning of the stage machinery was a miracle". Mechanisms for The Masque of Queens in February 1609 included "sundry seats above for the Queen and ladies to sit on and be turned round about". Alterations for staging masques were made by Andrew Kerwyn, paymaster of the royal works. Prince Henry's Barriers was performed in January 1610.

Robert Smythson made a drawing of the ground plan. An adjacent chamber was built to host events for the wedding of Princess Elizabeth and Frederick V of the Palatinate in 1613. The Somerset Masque in December 1613 included a personification of the Americas. Pocahontas and Tomocomo came to see the masque The Vision of Delight on 6 January 1617. The banqueting house was destroyed by fire in January 1619, when workmen, clearing up after New Year's festivities, decided to incinerate the rubbish or oil rags inside the building.

== Architecture ==
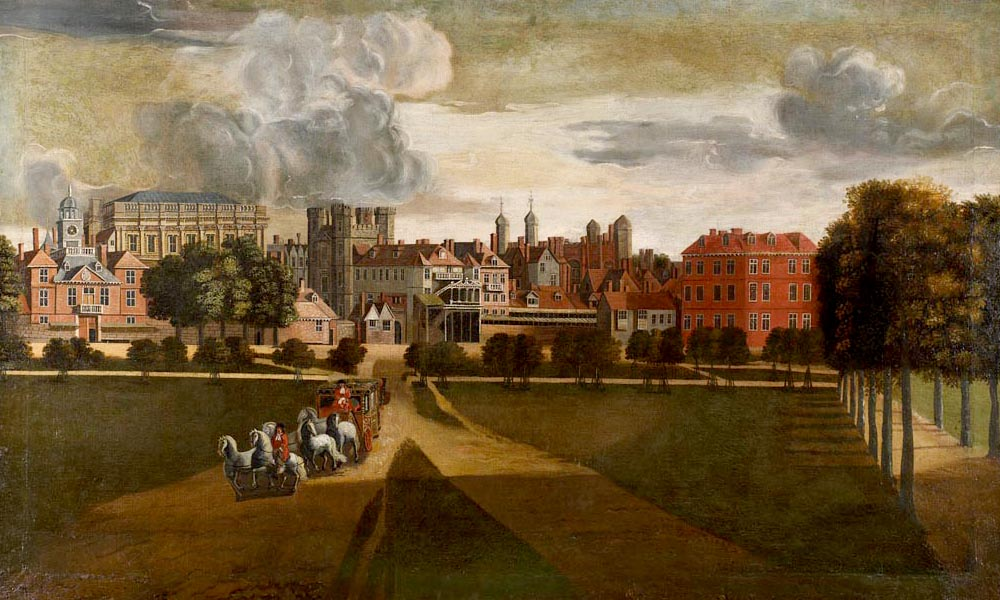
The old Palace of Whitehall, showing the Banqueting House to the left

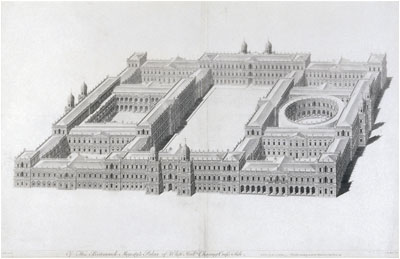
Inigo Jones' 1638 plan for a new palace at Whitehall, "one of the grandest architectural conceptions of the renaissance in England"; the Banqueting House is incorporated to the near left of the central courtyard (for the most part, Jones's plan was ultimately never executed)

The replacement Banqueting House was commissioned from the fashionable architect Inigo Jones. Jones had spent time in Italy studying the architecture evolving from the Renaissance and that of Andrea Palladio, and returned to England with what were, at the time, revolutionary ideas: to replace the eclectic style of the Jacobean English Renaissance with a more pure, classical design, which made no attempt to harmonise with the Tudor palace of which it was to be part.

The design of the Banqueting House is classical in concept. It introduced a refined Italianate Renaissance style that was unparalleled in the free and picturesque Jacobean architecture of England, where Renaissance motifs were still filtered through the engravings of Flemish Mannerist designers. The roof is essentially flat and the roofline is defined by a balustrade. On the street façade, the engaged columns, of the Corinthian and Ionic orders, the former above the latter, stand atop a high, rusticated basement and divide the seven bays of windows.

The building is on three floors: The ground floor, a warren of cellars and store rooms, is low; its small windows indicating by their size the lowly status and usage of the floor, above which is the double-height banqueting hall, which falsely appears from the outside as a first-floor piano nobile with a secondary floor above. The lower windows of the hall are surmounted by alternating triangular and segmental pediments, while the upper windows are unadorned casements. Immediately beneath the entablature, which projects to emphasize the central three bays, the capitals of the pilasters are linked by swags in relief, above which the entablature is supported by dental corbel table. Under the upper frieze, festoons and masks suggest the feasting and revelry associated with the concept of a royal banqueting hall.

The Banqueting House facades were originally faced with two kinds of stone providing a colour contrast. Oxfordshire stone was used for the walls, and Purbeck stone for the columns, pilasters, and other ornaments. At Inigo Jones's request, a new pier was built at the Isle of Purbeck in 1620 for shipping the stone. The foundations and internal walls were brick. Some of windows were partly blocked and plastered and painted over, possibly for ease of hanging tapestries. The building was later refaced with Portland stone only.

Much of the work on the Banqueting House was overseen by Nicholas Stone, a Devonshire mason who had trained in Holland. It has been said that, until this time, English sculpture resembled that described by the Duchess of Malfi: "the figure cut in alabaster kneels at my husband's tomb." Like Inigo Jones, Stone was well aware of Florentine art and introduced to England a more delicate classical form of sculpture inspired by Michelangelo's Medici tombs. This is evident in his swags on the street façade of the Banqueting House, similar to that which adorns the plinth of his Francis Holles memorial.

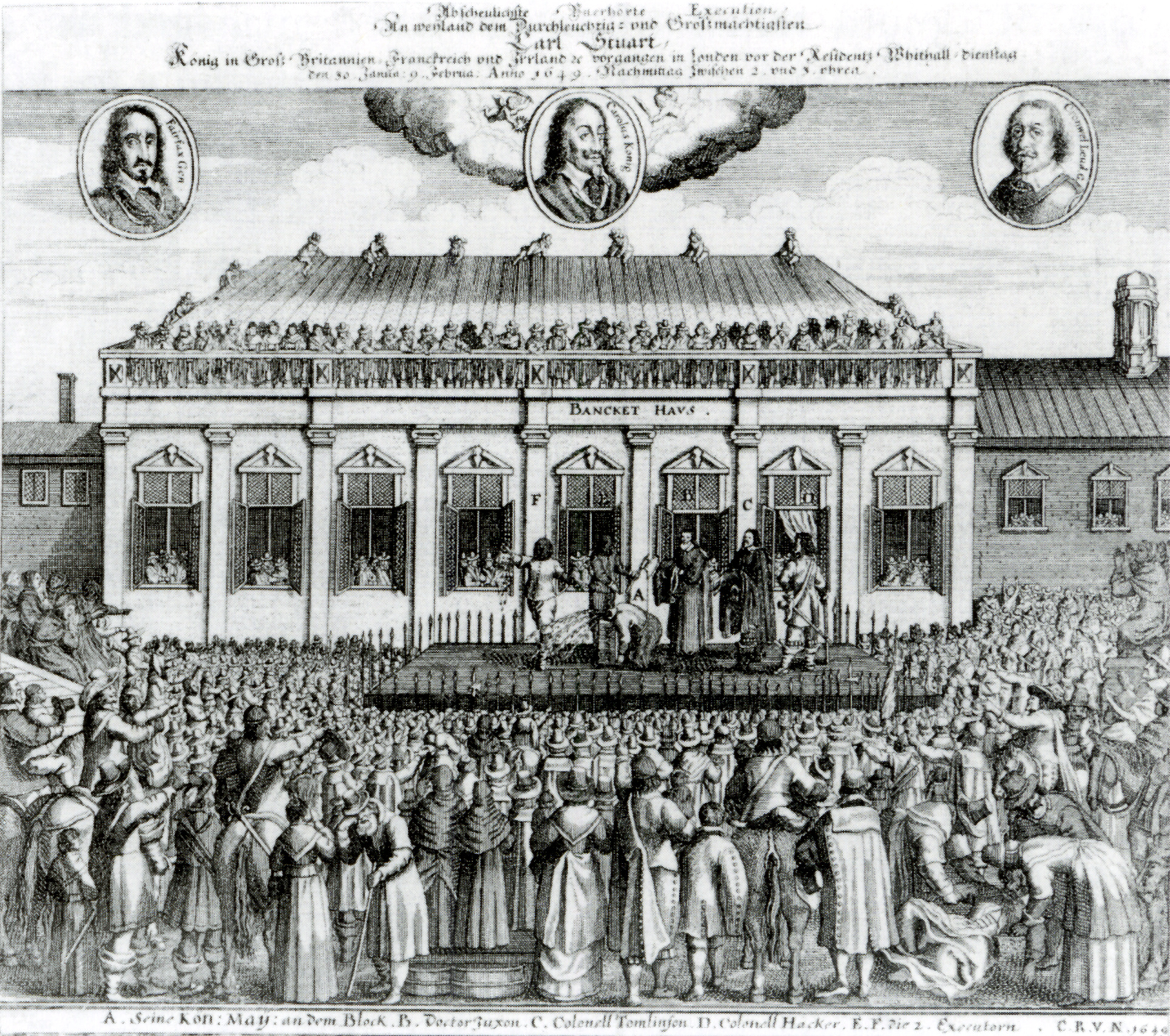
A contemporaneous German print showing the execution of Charles I on 30 January 1649 outside the Banqueting House, which is inaccurately depicted

In 1638, Jones drew the designs for a new and massive palace at Whitehall in which his banqueting house was to be incorporated as one wing enclosing a series of seven courtyards, visible on the monumental main façade as only a small flanking wing. These revealed the ideas behind Jones' concept of Palladianism. However, Charles I, who commissioned the plans, never amassed the resources to execute them; his lack of funds and the tensions that eventually led to the Civil War intervened and the plans were permanently shelved. The Second English Civil War resulted in Charles I's own execution outside Banqueting House following the defeat of Royalist forces.

In January 1698, the Tudor Palace was razed by fire that raged for 17 hours. All that remained was the Banqueting House, Whitehall Gate, and Holbein Gate. Christopher Wren and Nicholas Hawksmoor were asked to design a new palace, but nothing came of the scheme. It has been said that the widowed William III never cared for the area, but, had his wife, Mary II, been alive, with her appreciation of the historical significance of Whitehall, he would have insisted on the rebuilding.

=== Interior ===
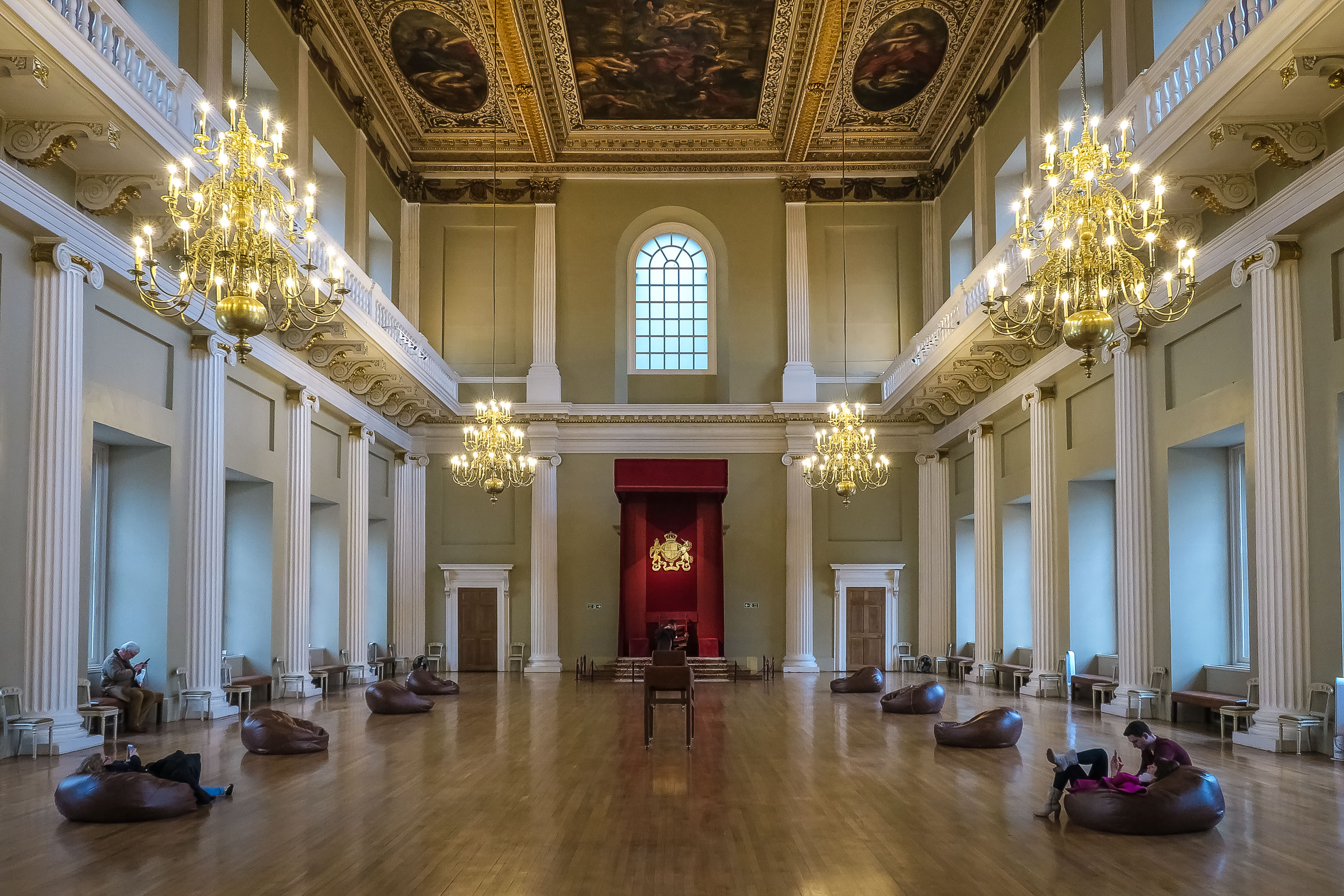
Interior of the Banqueting Hall

The term Banqueting House was something of a misnomer. The hall within the house was, in fact, used not only for banqueting, but also royal receptions, ceremonies, and the performance of masques. The entertainments given there would have been among the finest in Europe, for, during this period, England was considered its leading musical country. On 5 January 1617, Pocahontas and Tomocomo were brought before the King at the Banqueting House, at a performance of Ben Jonson's masque The Vision of Delight. According to John Smith, James I was so unprepossessing, neither Pocahontas nor Tomocomo realized whom they had met until it was explained to them afterward. Such masques were later augmented with French musicians, whom Queen Henrietta Maria, the wife of Charles I, brought to the court. The masques began a slow decline, however, after the death in 1625 of Orlando Gibbons, who died on a trip to meet the newly married Henrietta Maria and her musicians.

Inside the building is a single two-storey, double-cube room. The double-cube, in which the length of the room is twice its equal width and height, is another Palladianism, where all proportions are mathematically related. At the upper level, the room is surrounded by what is sometimes mistakenly referred to as a minstrels' gallery. While musicians may have played from this vantage point, its true purpose was to admit an audience; at the time of the Banqueting House's construction, kings still lived in "splendour and state", or publicly. The less exalted and the general public would be permitted to crowd the gallery in order to watch the king dine. The lower status of those in the gallery was emphasised by the lack of an internal staircase, the gallery only being accessible by an external staircase. The building was, however, later extended to accommodate an internal staircase.

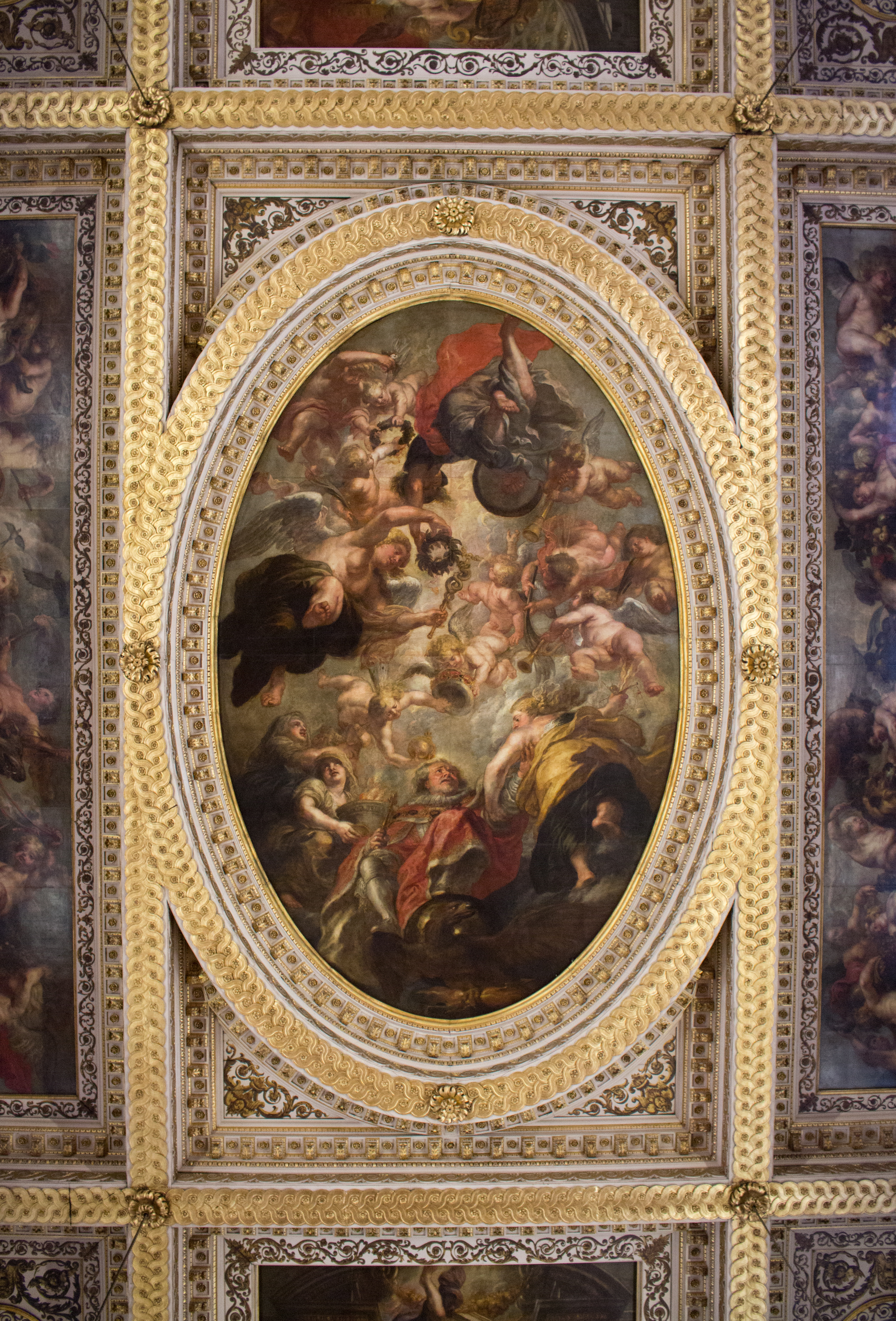
The Apotheosis of James I, the central panel of the ceiling, by Peter Paul Rubens

James I, for whom the Banqueting House was created, died in 1625 and was succeeded by his son, Charles I. The accession of Charles I heralded a new era in the cultural history of England. The new king was a great patron of the arts. He added to the Royal Collection and encouraged the great painters of Europe to come to England. In 1623 he visited Spain where he was impressed by Titian, Rubens, and Velázquez. It became his ambition to find a comparable painter for his own court. Rubens while in England as a diplomat was asked to design and paint the Banqueting House ceiling which was sketched in London but completed at his studio in Antwerp due to the scale of the job. It was probably commissioned in 1629–30, and finally installed in 1636, the ceiling having been completely remodelled to frame the various sections. The subject, commissioned by the King, was the glorification of his father, titled The Apotheosis of James I, and was an allegory of his own birth. To the King's chagrin, Rubens took his knighthood and decamped back to Antwerp, leaving Anthony van Dyck, lured not only with a knighthood but also a pension and a house, to remain in England as the court painter. The panels for the ceiling were all painted in Rubens' atelier in Antwerp and sent to London by ship. Inigo Jones later designed another double-cube room at Wilton House, to display van Dyck's portraits of the aristocratic Pembroke family.

Although Charles I lavished attention and effort on the Banqueting House, it was the scene of his death. On the afternoon of 30 January 1649, he stepped out of a first-floor window of Banqueting House onto the scaffold that had been erected outside for the purpose of his own execution. The actual window no longer exists, as it was not in the main hall but just outside it in an adjacent part of the building which has now gone. Seen from the outside, it would have been the next window along at the north end, roughly above the current visitors' entrance.

=== Legacy ===
Unlike the architecture of the more southern European countries, English architecture went through no period of evolution to classicism. Through Jones it arrived suddenly and fully formed. Before this, English architecture had still been based on the styles of the Middle Ages, if for the previous century influenced by Netherlandish and French renaissance classicism, which had resulted in an English renaissance style during the late Elizabethan and Jacobean periods. However, as can be seen at prodigy houses like Hatfield House, one of England's first purpose-built "Renaissance" houses, even during this era, English domestic architecture never quite lost its "castle air".

Although English architecture had been influenced, mostly indirectly, by Italian classicism for a century or so, resulting in the use of classical forms and motifs in late Tudor, Elizabethan and Jacobean buildings, on his return from Italy Jones brought with him far more thorough and up to date understanding of the underlying principles of late Renaissance classicism. With his work at the Queen's House in Greenwich, and the Banqueting House, Jones transformed English architecture.

The overthrow of the monarch and establishment of the puritanical Commonwealth caused the style to be seen as Royalist, which delayed its spread; but within a few years of the Restoration almost every English county was to have some buildings in the classical style. The Banqueting House and its features became much copied. A much-favoured motif was the placing of pediments above not only the focal point of a façade but also its windows. The use of alternating segmental and triangular pediments, an arrangement employed by Giorgio Vasari as early as 1550 at the Medicis' Palazzo Uffizi in Florence, was a particular favourite. Provincial architects began to recreate the motifs of the Banqueting House throughout England, with varying degrees of competence. Examples of the style's popularity can be found throughout England; the then-remote county of Somerset alone contains three 17th-century versions of the Banqueting House: Brympton d'Evercy, Hinton House, and Ashton Court. Following the fall of the monarchy, Jones' career was effectively ended, his style seen as royalist. He died in 1652, never having seen the popularity of the architectural concepts he introduced.

=== Later history ===
James II was the last monarch to live at Whitehall; William III and Mary II preferred to live elsewhere and eventually reconstructed Hampton Court Palace. Following the fire which destroyed Whitehall Palace, the Banqueting Hall became redundant for the purpose for which it was designed, and it was converted to a chapel to replace the Chapel Royal of Whitehall, which had been destroyed in the fire and was used to host concerts. It remained a chapel before being given to the Royal United Services Institute by Queen Victoria in 1893. Highly controversial plans to partition the large mansion house space in the service of offices for the Institution were quickly dropped in favour of the creation of a museum which displayed personal items of famous commanders and included the skeleton of Napoleon's horse. From the 1930s the main attraction was a series of 15 dioramas, showing the history of Britain, largely from a military angle. The museum closed in 1962, and the great south window, closed up by the RUSI, was restored.

Today, the banqueting hall is open for tours and use as a venue space.

== Bibliography ==
- Copplestone, Trewin (1963). World Architecture. London: Hamlyn.
- Dunning, Robert (1991). Somerset Country Houses. Wimborne, Dorset: The Dovecote Press.
- The Department for the Environment (1983). The Banqueting House Whitehall. Her Majesty's Stationery Office. ISBN 0-86056-106-2.
- Edwards, Graham (1999), The Last Days of Charles I, Sutton: Sutton Publishing Ltd, ISBN 978-0-7509-2679-9
- Fletcher, B (1921). A History of Architecture on the Comparative Method. London: B.T. Batsford, Ltd.
- Halliday, F. E. (1967). Cultural History of England. London: Thames & Hudson.
- Hart, V. (2002). '"Immaginacy set free": Aristotelian Ethics and Inigo Jones's Banqueting House at Whitehall', RES: Journal of Anthropology and Aesthetics, vol.39, pp. 151–67.
- Hart, V. (2011). Inigo Jones: The Architect of Kings. Yale University Press. ISBN 9780300141498
- Williams, Neville (1971). Royal Homes. Lutterworth Press. ISBN 0-7188-0803-7
