= The Masque of Beauty =

Masque by Ben Jonson

The Masque of Beauty was a courtly masque written by Ben Jonson, and performed in London's Whitehall Palace on 10 January 1608. It inaugurated the refurbished banqueting hall of the palace (the predecessor of Inigo Jones' building). It was a sequel to the preceding Masque of Blackness, which had been performed three years earlier, on 6 January 1605. In The Masque of Beauty, the "daughters of Niger" of the earlier piece were shown cleansed of the black pigment they had worn on the prior occasion.

== The show ==
Like its earlier companion piece, The Masque of Beauty was performed by Anne of Denmark and ladies of her court, and witnessed by King James. The Venetian ambassador Zorzi Giustinian gave credit to the Queen as "authoress of the whole". The number of court ladies included was increased from the twelve in Blackness to sixteen. The participants were the Countesses of Arundel, Bedford, Derby, and Montgomery, and the Ladies Chichester, Walsingham, Windsor, Anne Clifford, Elizabeth Girrard, Elizabeth Guilford, Elizabeth Hatton, Mary Neville, Katherine Petre, Anne Winter, and Arbella Stuart. Gossip held that the women chosen were largely Roman Catholic.

The masquers wore costumes of orange-tawny and silver or sea-green and silver; the torchbearers were dressed as Cupids; the presenters of the masque were styled as Januarius, Boreas, Vulturnus, and Thamesis, and the musicians as "echoes and shades of old poets." A black curtain representing Night was withdrawn to display the masquers, assembled on a "Throne of Beauty" borne upon a floating island. The sixteen masquers executed two dances, which the King liked enough to see repeated; then they danced with male courtiers, in "galliards and corantoes." The final dances returned them to the Throne of Beauty. The choreography was by Thomas Giles, who also played Thamesis.

A diplomatic controversy developed around the masque, as to which foreign ambassadors were or were not invited to attend the performance. The French ambassador Antoine Lefèvre de la Boderie was irate at being omitted while the Spanish Ambassador was invited. The Venetian ambassador Zorzi Giustinian, who was invited, was among the spectators who left descriptions of the "great golden masque" they'd seen, the jewels the ladies wore, and the marvels of the stage machinery employed. He attributed the masque to Anne of Denmark, as "authoress of the whole".

After the performance, Zorzi Giustininian conveyed his compliments to James VI and I. The King told him that the masque consecrated the rebirth of the Great Hall or Banqueting Hall, which had been built in timber and was now reconstructed in stone. After the event, the Spanish ambassador held a dinner for the fifteen ladies who had performed in the masque.

== Jewels, costume, and costs ==
The use of jewels in the costume was noted. The seated masquers around the throne "seemed to be a mine of light, struck from their jewels and their garments". John Chamberlain mentioned that a lady of lesser rank than a baroness wore jewels valued more than £100,000, and Arbella Stuart and Anne of Denmark's jewels were worth as much and more. Anne of Denmark wore a collar or necklace with the initials "P" and "M" that had belonged to Mary I of England. The necklace may have symbolised her preference for Prince Henry to marry a Spanish bride. The Spanish ambassador invited the fifteen gentlewomen who had performed in the masque to dinner at the end of the month.

Anne of Denmark's usher Zachary Bethell prepared a rehearsal space at Somerset House in December 1607. The Master Carpenter William Portington was responsible for putting the masque "in act". The embroiderer Christopher Shawe was paid £106-7s for his work on the costumes. The total cost of producing the masque was £4000. The House of Stuart was running an annual budget deficit of £140,000 in this era; the cost of the masque represented about 3% of the annual deficit, an enormous sum to spend on a single event.

== Publication ==
The Masque of Beauty was entered into the Stationers' Register on 21 April 1608 and published later that year by the bookseller Thomas Thorpe, in the same volume as The Masque of Blackness. Both masques were reprinted in the first folio collection of Jonson's works in 1616.

In 1609, an Italian poet, Antimo Galli, published Rime di Antimo Galli which includes stanzas describing the guests and participants in the masque.
