= Edward Russell, 3rd Earl of Bedford =

The Earl of Bedford
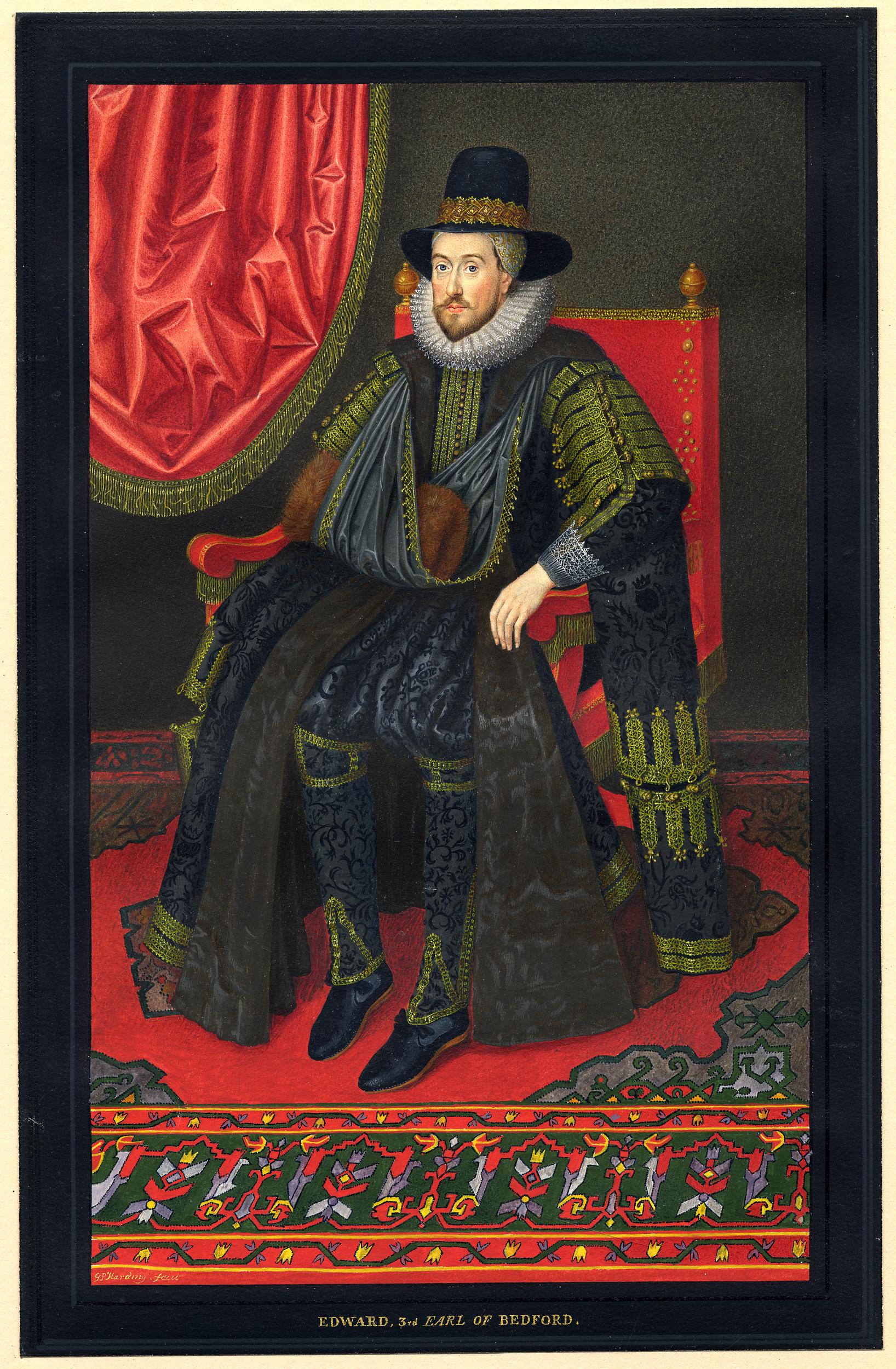
- copy by George Perfect Harding of a portrait by Marcus Gheeraerts the Younger
- Born: 20 December 1572
- Died: 3 May 1627 (aged 54)
- Spouse: Lucy Harington
- Father: Sir Francis Russell, Lord Russell
- Mother: Eleanor/Juliana Forster

Edward Russell, 3rd Earl of Bedford (20 December 1572 – 3 May 1627) was an English nobleman and politician.

== Early life ==
He was the son of Sir Francis Russell, Lord Russell and his wife, Eleanor Forster. He was the paternal grandson of Francis Russell, 2nd Earl of Bedford. His maternal grandparents were Sir John Forster of Bamburgh and Jane Radcliffe.

His father was shot and killed at a meeting on the Scottish border on 27 July 1585. In Scotland, James VI shed tears over the murder "like a newly beaten child". At first the family estates were managed by William Cecil. From 1586 the young earl's affairs were managed by his guardians Ambrose, Earl of Warwick (d. 1590) and Anne, Countess of Warwick.

In December 1593 it was said the "young Earl of Bedford was paying his addresses to Mrs Bridges, the lord Chandos' heir", meaning the queen's maiden of honour Elizabeth Brydges or her younger sister Catherine Brydges, who married Bedford's cousin and eventual heir, Francis Russell.

== Marriage and career ==
At the age of 22 he married Lucy Harington, the 13-year-old daughter of John Harington, 1st Baron Harington of Exton, on 13 December 1594, at St Dunstan's on Stepney Green. The marriage brought him £3,000 and the estate of Minster Lovell.

His wife, Lucy, at approximately 15, miscarried a pregnancy in February 1596 at Bedford House on the Strand in London. She would go on to become a major aristocratic patron of the arts and literature in the Elizabethan and Jacobean eras, the primary non-royal performer in contemporary court masques, a letter-writer, and a poet.

Bedford held the office of Custos Rotulorum of Devon between 1596 and 1619. His London home was Bedford House on the north side of the Strand.

In 1601, he joined the rebellion of the Earl of Essex. He was taken into custody where he wrote to the Privy Council saying that Lady Rich had summoned him to Essex House on 8 February 1601, and claimed he was not invited to Essex's conference there, and returned home. He was fined £10,000.

In the summer of 1607 and 1608 he hunted at Northall on lands held by the Earl of Salisbury. In July 1613 he was seriously injured in a fall from his horse while riding in his own park. A letter mentioned, my Lord of Bedford is exceeding ill, and not like to recover, yet if he may be able he doth purpose to try what good the bathe will do him". He never fully recovered his health.

He died in 1627, aged 54 at Moor Park, Hertfordshire, England, without surviving issue, where he had resided since 1614. He was buried on 11 May 1627 in the 'Bedford Chapel' at St. Michael's Church, Chenies, Buckinghamshire and his titles passed to his first cousin, Francis Russell.

Honorary titles
Preceded by Sir John Gilbert	Custos Rotulorum of Devon; 1596–1619	Succeeded by The Lord Russell of Thornhaugh
Peerage of England
Preceded by Francis Russell	Earl of Bedford; 1585–1627	Succeeded by Francis Russell
