= The Masque of Blackness =

Masque by Ben Jonson

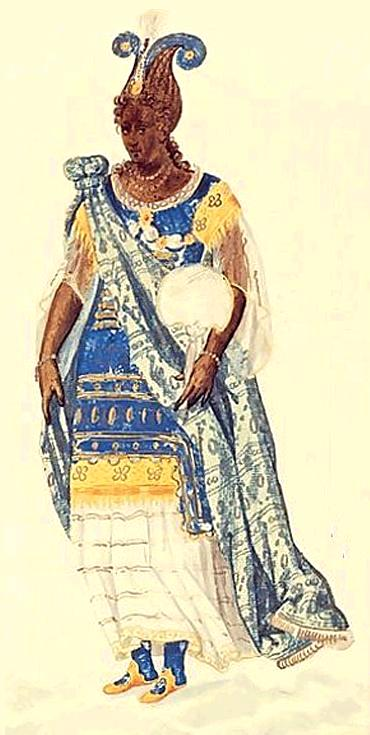
Daughter of Niger - costume design by Inigo Jones for The Masque of Blackness

The Masque of Blackness was an early Jacobean era masque, first performed at the Stuart Court in the Banqueting Hall of Whitehall Palace on Twelfth Night, 6 January 1605. It was written by Ben Jonson at the request of Anne of Denmark, the queen consort of King James I, who wished the masquers to be disguised as Black Africans. Anne was one of the performers in the masque along with her court ladies, all of whom appeared in blackface makeup. In a ceremony earlier on the day, Prince Charles, Anne's second son (who was still in Scotland at Dunfermline Palace) was given the title of Duke of York.

== Plot and themes ==
The plot of the masque follows the ladies arriving at the royal court to be "cleansed" of their blackness by King James; a stage direction that was impossible to fulfill on stage. They had been instructed by a riddle to seek the land "Britannia". The theme of the masque was a commentary on political union and the disparate identities of the peoples of Britain. The Masque of Beauty was written as a sequel to The Masque of Blackness, and originally intended for the following holiday season. It was displaced by Hymenaei, the masque for the wedding of the Earl of Essex and Frances Howard and Beauty was finally performed in 1608.

Jonson credited the central themes of the masque to Anne of Denmark. The idea of disguising as sub-Saharan African performers may have been suggested to her by reports of a masque at the coronation of her brother Christian IV of Denmark in 1596. Courtiers, and possibly the king himself, took part in a dance as Roman heroes and Moors. African actors or actors representing Africans had featured in Scottish court entertainments in the previous century. "Moor" was a term used for African people and others who were imagined as exotic peoples at this time. One revels account calls the performance "The Queen's Majesties Maske of Moures".

The performers may have represented Scots in England at the Union of Crowns and the formation of a new British state. The appearance of Anne of Denmark and her ladies as African people could satisfy both Scottish and English courtiers, seen as a commentary on the relative civility of both nations. Jonson, familiar with the works of the historians William Camden and Claudian on Stilicho, may have adapted Roman descriptions of painted and scarified Pictish people, and a conception of blackness, to form a new idea of British sovereignty and empire.

== Design ==
The sets, costumes, and stage effects were designed by Inigo Jones; Blackness was the first of many masques for the Stuart Court on which Jonson and Jones would collaborate. Inigo Jones worked up his drawings for costumes with Anne of Denmark, who would have been consulted on the colours. The music for Blackness was composed by Alfonso Ferrabosco.

Jones designed a raised and mobile stage on wheels for the masque, forty feet square and four feet off the floor; this was employed for many subsequent masques. The stage contained inner space for the machines that produced stage effects and the technicians who operated them. The King was often stilling on a stool, resembling the sun. Blackness introduced effects that Jones would repeat with variation throughout his career as a stage designer: it opened with a tempestuous seascape, simulated by flowing and billowing cloths.

The opening stormy sea was populated with six blue-haired merman-like tritons. The gods Oceanus ("blue") and Niger (black) entered, mounted upon giant seahorses. The twelve daughters of Niger, played by the Queen and her ladies in waiting, entered in the company of a dozen nymphs of Oceanus as torchbearers; the ladies of the Court were dressed in tones of silver and azure to contrast with the blackness of the makeup, with pearls and feathers in their hair and attires, and accessories of "orient pearl, best setting off from the black", while the torchbearers, in green doublets with gold puffed sleeves, had their faces, hands, and hair dyed blue. The ladies rode in a great hollow seashell, which seemed to float upon and move with the waves, and was accompanied by six large sea monsters carrying more torchbearers.

== Plot summary ==
The text begins with Niger talking to his father Oceanus. Oceanus asks him why he has left his usual eastward course and flowed westward, into the Atlantic. Niger tells him that he has come to request help. Niger's daughters are upset because they thought themselves to be the most beautiful goddesses in the world, only to discover that paleness is thought more attractive – and so no longer feel beautiful. The moon goddess, Aethiopia, tells the daughters that, if they can find a country whose name ends in "tannia", they will be beautiful once more.

The daughters try desperately to find the country whose name ends in "tannia", travelling as far as Mauritania (the coastal Mediterranean Maghreb), Lusitania (Portugal), and Aquitania (France) in their quest. Despondent at their lack of success they pray once more to Aethiopia, who tells them that the country is Britannia and that they should seek out its sun-like king, who has the power to bleach their black complexions white. In 1605, the nature of Britannia "whose new name makes all tongues sing" and a fuller union was in debate.

Aethiopia further advises the daughters that once a month for the next year, they should bathe in sea-dew called "Rosmarine" and "soft and gentler foam". Thus prepared, at the same time next year, they should appear before the king again, whereupon his light will make them beautiful and white.

== Cast ==
The names of the principal cast of twelve masquers were published. They danced in pairs with fans which displayed their names and the emblem of the couple. The twelve names were devised from classical examples by Jonson to represent various qualities, in brackets below. Jonson called the six symbols or emblems "mute hieroglyphics".

- Queen Anne................Euphoris (abundance)
- Countess of Bedford........Aglaia (splendour)
- Lady Herbert...............Diaphane (transparency)
- Countess of Derby.....Eucampse (flexibilty)
- Lady Rich........................Ocyte (swiftness)
- Countess of Suffolk.......Kathare (spotless)
- Lady Bevill.........................Notis (moisture)
- Lady Effingham...........Psychrote (cold)
- Lady Elizabeth Howard....Glycyte (sweetness)
- Lady Susan Vere.............Malacia (delicacy)
- Lady Mary Wroth...............Baryte (weight)
- Lady Walsingham.........Periphere (circulation)

A newsletter from court described the cast of the "Queen's mask" in December 1604, noting that three women were excused because of illness, the Countess of Nottingham, the Countess of Richmond who had measles, and the Countess of Northumberland. Lady Hatton was not invited to perform and left court. "Lady Herbert" was Anne Herbert, a daughter of Henry Herbert, 2nd Earl of Pembroke and Mary Sidney.

Some of the jewels displayed on the masque costumes were borrowed from London merchants including John Spilman and Richard Hanbury. The loaned jewels were valued at £10,000, and Anne of Denmark's chamberlain, Robert Sidney, became liable for £40 for two lost diamonds. Sidney attended the masque, wearing a new suit of ash colour satin and peach colour taffeta which cost him £80.

== Responses ==
Anne of Denmark had performed in costume in masques in Scotland, but the only known criticism came from the Scottish kirk objecting to "balling" in her household. Her masque at Winchester in October 1603 had drawn adverse comment, apparently damaging reputations of female courtiers. The Masque of Blackness again exposed Anne and her ladies in waiting to censure for perceived trangressions. The masque was controversial in its day, in part for the production's use of body paint instead of masks to simulate dark skin. One observer, Sir Dudley Carleton expressed his displeasure with the play as such:

Instead of Vizzards, their Faces, and Arms up to the Elbows, were painted black, which was a Disguise sufficient, for they were hard to be known; but it became them nothing so well as their red and white, and you cannot imagine a more ugly Sight, than a Troop of lean-cheek'd Moors.

Red and white were more usual colours for formal costume, such the gowns worn at the coronation, but Dudley Carleton more likely refers to the usual use of cosmetics and make-up in which red and white were dominant. In another letter, Carleton objected to the decorum of the costume for the aristocratic female performers, as the "apparell was rich, but too light and courtesan-like for such great ones. Their black face and hands, which were painted and bare up the elbows, was a very loathsome sight and I am sorry that strangers should see our court so strangely disguised".

Carleton also made a topical joke, comparing the huge sea-monsters in the masque that flanked the shell that housed the nymphs with an unusual sighting of a seal in the Thames at Isleworth, "it came in company with the Sea-fish that drew in our Lady-Moors, and carried a Waiting Gentlewoman and some baggage!".

Another writer, who was not himself an eyewitness, described the masque dancers' appearance and the expense; "the Queen and some dozen ladies all paynted like Blackamores, face and neck bare, and for the rest strangely attired in Barbaresque mantells to the halfe legge, having buskins all to be sett with jewells, with a wave of the sea as it were very artificially made and brought to stage by secrett ingines cast forth of a scallop shell to performe the residue of the devise of dancing etc. ... it took the King betweene 4 or £5,000 to execute to Queen's fancy". Although Carleton and others characterised the revealing costumes as transgressive, surviving drawings and archival evidence show that they set the style for future productions.

A poem, perhaps by John Donne or Henry Goodere, was addressed to one of the masquers, possibly Lucy, Countess of Bedford. It begins, "Why chose shee black; was it that in whitenes, She did Leda equall".

The make-up used could not be quickly removed, so a metamorphosis from black to white was not staged. James's promised transformation of the daughters of Niger was not staged, but Albion had become "Britannia". Anne of Denmark's apothecary John Wolfgang Rumler is known to have devised a more easily removeable blackface make-up for a masque in 1621, The Gypsies Metamorphosed.

The masque was expensive, costing £3000. It caused consternation among some English observers due to the perceived impropriety of the performance. Controversy also stemmed from the predominant role of female actresses playing what were considered traditionally male roles.

The texts of The Masque of Blackness and The Masque of Beauty were published together in quarto form in 1608, by the bookseller Thomas Thorpe; they were reprinted in the first folio collection of Jonson's works in 1616. The playwright Richard Brome referred to the masque and the use of make-up in The English Moor produced in the 1630s.

== Modern criticism ==
The representation of African people in court masques had precedents both in England and Scotland. Anne of Denmark had African servants. There was a masque involving blackface at the coronation of Christian IV of Denmark in 1596, witnessed by Anne of Denmark's brother, the Duke of Holstein and perhaps, by Inigo Jones.

Blackness receives continuing critical interest for its conceptions of race, ethnicity and imperialism as England was just entering in an organized way into the slave trade. Kim F. Hall draws attention to The Masque of Blackness and the documented reactions of its audience, in the context of the "growth of actual contact with Black Africans, Native Americans, and other ethnically different foreigners" and a "collision of the dark lady tradition with the actual African difference encountered in the quest for empire". A "pride in the revival of ancient Britain is continually yoked to the glorification of whiteness". For Bernadette Andrea the masque reveals "complicity with an emerging institutional racism as England's increasing investment in the transatlantic slave trade underwrote its imperialist expansion in to the Americas".

At the time of the masque, there was neither an English Atlantic slave trade, which had ceased with John Hawkins' last slaving voyage in 1569 and would not resume until the voyage of the Star in 1641, nor any English empire or colonies in the Americas, for the Roanoke Colony had disappeared by 1590, and the Jamestown settlement would not be founded until 1607.
