= Hymenaei =

Play written by Ben Jonson

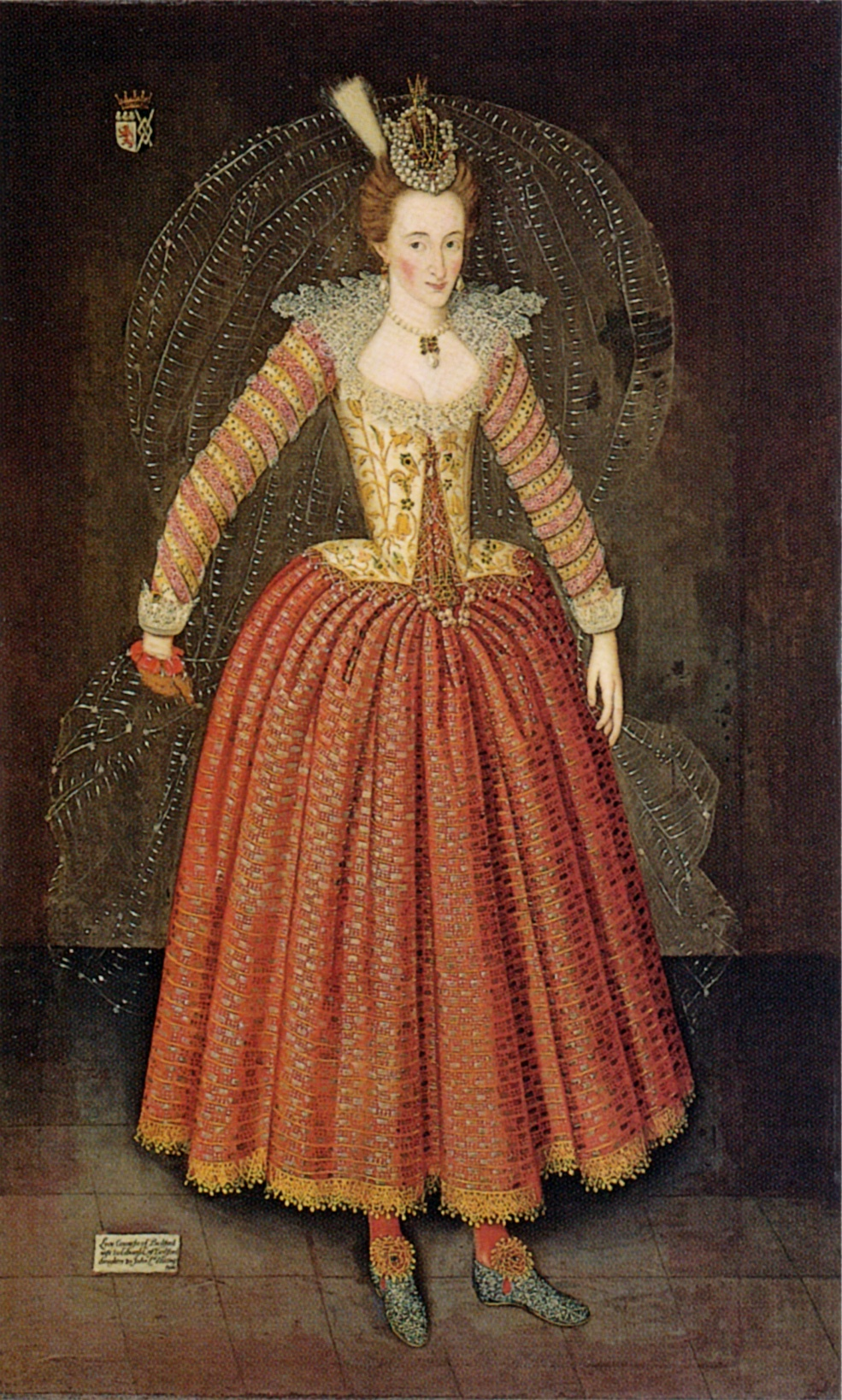
Lucy Russell, Countess of Bedford in a costume for Hymenaei designed by Inigo Jones

Hymenaei, or The Masque of Hymen, was a masque written by Ben Jonson for the marriage of Robert Devereux, 3rd Earl of Essex, and Lady Frances Howard, daughter of the Earl of Suffolk, and performed on their wedding day, 5 January 1606. The costumes, sets, and scenic effects were designed by Inigo Jones, and the music composed by Alfonso Ferrabosco.

One of Jonson's earlier masques, Hymenaei is significant in the evolution of the masque form in the early 17th century; its two sets of contrasting dancers constituted one step in the evolution of the anti-masque that Jonson would realize fully in The Masque of Queens three years later (1609).

== Performance ==
The stage was set as an altar for a Roman wedding; behind the altar, between gold-painted statues of Hercules and Atlas, a great sphere was suspended from the ceiling on wire so fine it was invisible to the audience. The side of the sphere facing the viewers was painted as a globe of the Earth, in blue and silver. Hymen, the Roman god of marriage, was represented by a figure in saffron robes, with yellow hose and a circlet of roses and marjoram on his head; he was accompanied by a white-clad bride and groom. The sphere rotated, revealing a hollow lower half occupied by eight men. The sphere descended, and the eight men, armed with swords, surrounded the wedding couple. But Reason, dressed in a blue gown spangled with stars and mathematic symbols and carrying a lamp, emerged from the top half of the sphere to intervene and halt the disruption. A cloud-painted curtain above this scene was raised to reveal Juno seated on a golden throne, flanked by peacocks and by comets and meteors. Eight female masquers descended from the heavens to join the eight males.

The male masquers, costumed in "carnation cloth of silver, with variously colored mantles," represented the "Humours and Affections;" the female dancers, "in white cloth of silver, with carnation and blue undergarments," represented the "Powers of Juno." The eight couples, the men with their swords sheathed, then danced again for the obvious symbolism. The dancers at one point formed the initials of the bride and groom.

A dancer dressed in white represented Frances Howard, accompanied by two pages carrying a distaff and spindle. This symbolism evoked virtuous marriage and pastoral simplicity. The writer of court news letters John Pory understood that the masque made an allusion to the Union of the Kingdoms of Scotland and England. The masque has been described, somewhat romantically, as a work of "fragile, transient loveliness," featuring "noble dancers in their crimson satin and white, with herons' feathers waving and jewels flashing, as they made their graceful movements in the torchlight."

== Cast ==
Three surviving portraits of women in masque costume by John de Critz may depict those who performed as Powers of Juno. These courtiers were; Lucy Russell, Countess of Bedford, Susan Vere, Countess of Montgomery, Elizabeth Sidney, Countess of Rutland, Lady Knollys, Lady Berkeley, Dorothy Hastings, Blanche Somerset, and Cecily Sackville. The Countess of Rutland bought some items of her costume including a coronet and ruff, and gave £80 to Anne of Denmark's usher Zachary Bethell towards the costs of staging the masque.

Eight male performers represented the four Humours and four Affections. They were Lord Willoughby, Lord Walden, James Hay, the Earl of Montgomery, Thomas Howard, Thomas Somerset, the Earl of Arundel, and John Ashley or John Astley.

== The Barriers ==
The following day saw the performance of the second portion of the entertainment, the Barriers, a stylized ritual combat presented in the Banqueting House at Whitehall. Two women dressed in identical blue and white costumes with palm-leaf crowns purported to be Truth. One spoke in favour of the institution of marriage, and the second that it enslaved women. Next sixteen pairs knights contested with swords and pikes to defend these propositions. Peace and amity were restored by an angel emerging from a blaze of light. The angel brought the true figure of Truth, the advocate of marriage who had spoken first.

The Duke of Lennox was chieftain of the victorious combatants, fighting against Lord Sussex's team. The members of the two teams were, as Knights of Truth; Lennox, Lord Effingham, Lord Walden, Lord Monteagle, Thomas Somerset, Charles Howard, John Gray, Thomas Monson, John Leigh, Robert Mansell, Edward Howard, Henry Goodere, Roger Dalison, Francis Howard, Lewis Mansel, with "Mr Gunteret" (the Bohemian or German courtier Henry de Gunderot), and as the Knights of Opinion; the Earl of Sussex, Lord Willoughby, Lord Gerrard, Robert Carey, Oliver Cromwell, William Herbert, Robert Drury, William Woodhouse, Cary Reynolds, Richard Houghton, William Constable, Thomas Gerrard, Robert Killigrew, Thomas Badger, Thomas Dutton, and John Digby.

== Publication ==
The masque was published later in 1606, in an edition printed by Valentine Simmes for the bookseller Thomas Thorpe – the first of Jonson's masques to be issued in print. The volume contains a preface in which Jonson envisions the performance of a masque as its body, but the meaning of the masque (as recorded in its text) as its soul. The work was printed again when included in the first folio collection of Jonson's works in 1616. Its full title in the latter text is Hymenaei, or The Solemnities of Masque and Barriers at a Marriage.

== The marriage ==
The marriage celebrated by the masque had been arranged by King James I, perhaps at the suggestion of Robert Cecil the Lord Treasurer, as a means of settling the rivalry of the Devereux and Howard families. Combatants in the Barriers fighting for virginity were dressed in the colours of the executed Earl of Essex and several had been knighted in his service, while those defending marriage included members of the Howard family and their allies.

The groom was fourteen years old, the bride thirteen, and the two were separated for three years immediately after their marriage to allow them time to mature. Unsurprisingly, the marriage was not a success, and was annulled in 1613. Lady Frances went on to marry James's favorite Robert Carr, 1st Earl of Somerset, and to play her part in the murder of Sir Thomas Overbury.

== See also ==
- 1606 in literature
