= Peter Street (carpenter) =

English carpenter (c.1553–1609)

Peter Street (1 July 1553 (baptised) – May 1609) was an English carpenter and builder in London. He built the Fortune Playhouse and the Globe Theatre, two significant establishments in the history of the stage in England. He had a part in building King James's Banqueting House in Whitehall Palace and he may have been responsible for the settings for the king's royal masques.

== Early life ==
Street was the fourth of eight children of John Street, a joiner of St Stephen Coleman Street parish in the City of London, and his wife Margaret Bullasse, who married in 1546. He was ten when his father died in 1563 and was the only one of his brothers and sisters to survive into adulthood. At the age of sixteen, on Lady Day in 1570 (25 March 1570), Street was indentured for an eight-year term of apprenticeship to carpenter William Brittaine. After a year, Street's talent was noticed by Robert Maskall, an important figure in the carpenters' guild, the Worshipful Company of Carpenters, and Maskall bought Brittaine's contract for the remainder of Street's apprenticeship. Maskall introduced Street as a freeman (full member) of the guild on completion of his indentured term in March 1577.

No record of Street's marriage has been found, but this is assumed to have taken place in 1581. Street's mother had remarried in 1569 and in 1581 his stepfather William Marrytt, a prosperous brewer, made a gift of a house and shop to his stepson. It is probable that this was to mark Street's wedding, to one Elizabeth. Their first child, John, was born in March 1584. In due course, in August 1608, John in his turn completed his apprenticeship, becoming a freeman of the Carpenters' guild.

== Career ==
In August 1581, Street bought the lease to the house of his old employer Robert Maskall, a "company house" belonging to the Carpenters' guild, an indication that his business had prospered and, indeed, that he was held in good standing within his profession. In due course he was able to pay for extra land: two gardens again leased from the guild. In August 1584, he was elected liveryman of the guild with the requirement, somewhat reluctantly accepted, to represent the Company on formal occasions, and in 1598 he became its Second Warden. He could have then expected to follow his former employer, Maskall, and become guild Master but in the years following 1599 he was censured for "taking his ease" and idly neglecting guild business, and he rose no further. (Professionally he was far from idle, with pressing construction projects, such as an over-running contract to build the Fortune Theatre, taking up his time.) In 1608 the Carpenters succeeded in having him imprisoned for absence from guild meetings, but a court of City Aldermen countermanded them and he was released on the same day.

== Theatres ==
=== The Theatre, Shoreditch ===
Street's first experience of theatre construction was possibly at The Theatre in Shoreditch, in 1576. James Burbage, the promoter, was a fellow-parishioner of the Street family at St Stephen's Church and the men were well known to each other. Although no record naming the man responsible for The Theatre's construction survives, Street was in the last year of his apprenticeship and could have been employed on the project. (James's brother, Robert Burbage, had completed his carpenter's apprenticeship three years earlier and presumably was also involved in the work.)

=== Blackfriars ===
In 1596, James Burbage acquired part of the old Blackfriars priory, where a company of child actors, the Children of the Chapel, was already established in another of the old buildings. As Burbage was commissioning alterations to his purchase, to add galleries and extra seating for his intended audience, Street acquired a house and waterfront woodyard near Bridewell, just over the River Fleet from Burbage's purchase and directly connected by a narrow bridge. (Details of the complicated leasing arrangements for Street's new property survive, as the head lessee died just after accepting a deposit for arranging the transaction and a court case was necessary to resolve the issue.) Although no documentary record specifying Street's involvement with the Blackfriars project has been found, it is assumed that he acquired the woodyard so that he could be close to the site of his new contract. A waterfront yard was necessary as Street stayed in Berkshire, near to where his timber was grown, to prefabricate the components for his timber-framed buildings in London, and then transported the pieces by barge down the Thames to where they were needed. Burbage discharged him before the priory project was completed, as influential local residents had petitioned the authorities and prevented the Burbages' plan.

Much later, after Street had established himself as a builder of London's playhouses, he returned to Blackfriars to complete the conversion work he had started for the Burbages; as members of the King's Men, under the patronage of King James himself, the Burbages were now able to outface any local opposition and in 1608 they re-engaged Street to finish the work he had started.

=== The Globe ===
When the Blackfriars scheme was put aside, because of insurmountable opposition from some influential neighbours, it was Street to whom James's sons, Cuthbert the business manager and actor Richard, turned for a new solution. (James himself had died early in 1597.) The matter was pressing, because the Burbages were about to lose their existing playhouse, The Theatre, when their lease expired, an event that would probably mean the dissolution of their successful company, the Lord Chamberlain's Men. The eight sharers in the Chamberlain's Men, after securing a long lease on land in Southwark, on the other side of the Thames, arranged for Street to remove the oak timbers of The Theatre for re-use in their new premises; they were forced to reduce the costs of the venture as far as they could, following their thwarted expenditure at Blackfriars. On 28 December 1598, Street, with twelve of his men and "diverse other persons", started to dismantle the old Theatre. Street assured bystanders that he was only starting a refurbishment project, intending to rebuild the structure "in another form", but in due course the half-ton oak beams were on their way by wagon to Street's Bridewell yard. There they were stored until the pile and masonry foundations at Southwark, prepared under Street's direction by one William Shepherd to "force the building out of the marsh", as Ben Jonson put it, were complete. Three weeks after the raid Street found himself the chief defendant in a court case, brought by The Theatre's landlord Giles Allen, complaining of the "carrying away of…all the wood and timber thereof", but no determination was made, as claim and counterclaim between the Burbages and Allen occupied lawyers for years to come.

As well as storing the reclaimed material from The Theatre, Street's preparations would have included prefabricating extra framing for his structure, near to where the timber was grown and seasoned, upriver in Berkshire—The Globe was going to be larger than the building it replaced. In a later building project, that of The Fortune theatre in the following year, Street fabricated and loosely fitted together the timber framing at Windsor and Maidenhead, and it is assumed that he followed this procedure for The Globe as well. Once the foundations were complete, erection took a further ten weeks, finishing in the Summer of 1599, leaving only the lath and plaster infill to complete. The cost was £700. The "Glory of the Bank", as Ben Jonson described the new theatre, was very near to The Rose, the playhouse of their rival company The Admiral's Men, and The Swan.

=== The Fortune ===
In January 1600 Philip Henslowe, the proprietor of The Rose theatre now so surpassed by its new neighbour The Globe, in turn commissioned Street to build a new theatre in competition at a site in Finsbury, north of the City, to be called The Fortune. The contract and accounts for the work survive and it is evident that Henslowe approved of Street's work on The Globe, as in many places the contract merely specified that in the new building Street should do as had been done at The Globe; the major difference was that The Fortune was to be a square building, as opposed to the polygonal Globe. While labourers and bricklayers prepared the foundations Street returned to Berkshire to select and prepare his timber—the contract specified, in a possible further allusion to The Globe's construction, that only new timber was to be used. By early May 1600 the foundations in London, and the carpentry in Berkshire, were nearly complete and the building was finished, a little later than Street had anticipated, in August 1600. Street was paid £400, less than he had received for the Globe, but Henslowe is on record as having travelled to Berkshire to pay directly for materials Street was working on there, and local wages.

=== The Hope ===
Philip Henslowe retained property in Southwark after opening The Fortune in Finsbury, and in June 1606 he contracted Street to demolish his Bear Garden, a bear-baiting arena, and re-build it as the Hope Theatre but Street died before the main part of the work started and the eventual rebuilding was carried out by Gilbert Katherens.

== Other work ==
At one of the court cases to settle the 1596 Bridewell leasehold dispute, Street described himself as a member of the Queen's household, but the other party accused him of making this claim only to overawe his opponents and so divert attention from his "dishonest practices". An inconclusive Palace record of 1593 does show one "Peter Street" as living and working at court, but in what capacity is not recorded. There is, however, no doubt that later in his working life, as he rose to prominence, he did work for the royal household. He was on good terms with William Portington, the king's carpenter, and he certainly provided specialist knowledge and machinery when the first permanent Banqueting House, built in 1606 to provide a theatrical setting for royal occasions, was put up. Apart from offering the benefit of his experience in theatre design, Street's particular contribution was the wooden columns, hollowed out to prevent splitting and painted to resemble marble, in the style of those at The Globe. Mary Edmond speculates that Street's experience in theatre construction was also put to use in building the stage and seating for the royal masques at James's court.

He was carpenter to the Bridewell Palace, but this was not a royal appointment as the former palace of King Henry was, at that time, in use as the Bridewell Hospital, an orphanage. After his death Street's son John was appointed to the post.

== In literature and other media ==
The poet Seamus Heaney commemorated Street's work in his 1965 poem Peter Street at Bankside. In the second episode of the third season of the new Doctor Who series he appears, played by Matt King, imprisoned in an asylum.
