= The Masque of Queens =

17th-century play by Ben Jonson

The Masque of Queens, Celebrated From the House of Fame is one of the earlier works in the series of masques that Ben Jonson composed for the House of Stuart in the early 17th century. Performed at Whitehall Palace on 2 February 1609, it marks a notable development in the masque form, in that Jonson defines and elaborates the anti-masque for the first time in its pages.

== Masque development ==
In his preceding masques, Jonson had been experimenting with elements of sharper opposition and variety: The Masque of Blackness (1605) and The Masque of Beauty (1608), both written for and featuring Queen Anne, form a contrasting and complementary pairing; Hymenaei (1606) contained two contrasting sets of masquers; and The Hue and Cry After Cupid (1608) featured twelve boy torchbearers "in antic attire." In the case of The Masque of Queens, Jonson writes that Queen Anne "had commanded me to think on some dance or show that might precede hers and have the place of a foil or false masque...." Jonson responded with a dance for a dozen female figures "in the habit of hags or witches...the opposites to good Fame...," to supply "a spectacle of strangeness...."

The masque was probably the first to use a revolving stage, known as machina versatilis, which was lit by coloured lights said to have glittered like emeralds and rubies. Anne requested jewellery, including two collars set with precious stones and pearls from the Jewel House "for the Quene to weare at the Maske". Inigo Jones made drawings for the costumes, Atalanta, played by the Countess of Arundel, was dressed in crimson, yellow, and blue.

An usher, Peter Frank, prepared the Lord Chamberlain's lodgings at Whitehall to be a dressing room for Anne of Denmark, "to make her ready for the maske with the rest of the ladies".

== The show ==
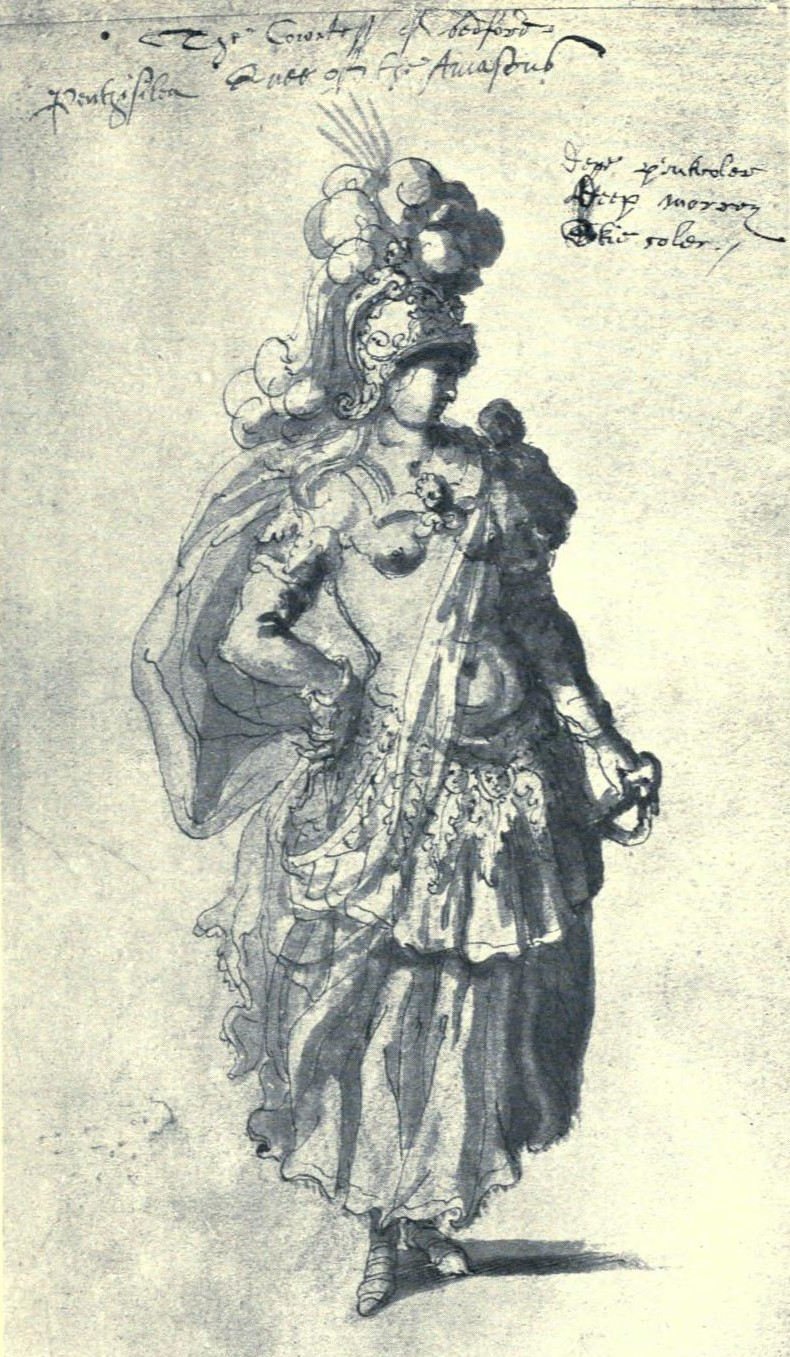
Drawing for the costume of Penthesilea for the Countess of Bedford by Inigo Jones.

A mistress witch and her eleven disciples all dance, then each witch testifies her crimes and outrages to her mistress, before they fall once again into "a magical dance, full of preposterous change and gesticulation." Their antics are interrupted and dispelled by the intrusion of the masque proper: the House of Fame is displayed, with twelve virtuous Queens, their apotheosis being "Bel-Anna". The roles of the other Queens were filled by eleven ladies of the court:

== Cast ==
In this and the masques that followed at Court, the characters in the masque proper were generally "personated" by members of the Court; but the undignified anti-masque roles were filled by professional actors from the organized companies.

- Anne of Denmark: Bel-Anna.
- The Countess of Arundel: Hypisicratea, but first cast as Atalanta.
- The Countess of Derby: Zenobia
- The Countess of Huntingdon:
- The Countess of Bedford: Penthesilea
- The Countess of Essex
- The Countess of Montgomery: Thomyris
- Viscountess of Cranbourne
- Lady Elizabeth Guilford: Artemisia
- Lady Anne Winter: Candace.
- Lady Catherine Windsor: Camilla
- Lady Windsore (wife of the 6th Baron Windsor; these three were daughters of the Earl and Countess of Worcester)
- Lady Anne Clifford: Berenice.

== Significance ==
Jonson's use of witches in the anti-masque is an interesting commentary on the witch craze of the era. More generally, the invention of the anti-masque shaped the art form of the masque for the remainder of its life. Some modern critics, approaching the masque from a more skeptical if not jaundiced perspective than that of its creators and participants, see the anti-masque as a subversion of the surface intent of the performance. ("But this antimasque quite eclipses its masque. The queens are mere wax-works after the witches" — the verdict of The Cambridge History of English and American Literature.) In the end, the disorderly and disruptive forces of the anti-masque are always driven off by a re-established order (which is always "the established order"); but that order is presented in a hyper-idealized style that contrasts sharply with the flawed and limited humans who are enacting the parts (and the courtiers and other dependants in the audience know those flaws and limits all too well). In this interpretation, the anti-masque undermines the intention of the performance, giving it an effect opposite to the one intended. In the anti-masque, the Stuarts are, perhaps, unwittingly subverting their authority.

== Texts ==
The Masque of Queens was published soon after its performance, by the command of Prince Henry, with a dedication to him as the Crown Prince. The work was entered into the Stationers' Register on February 22, 1609, and the edition that followed was printed by Nicholas Okes for the booksellers Richard Bonian and Henry Walley. After its initial quarto printing in 1609, The Masque of Queens was one of the fourteen masques included by Jonson in the 1616 folio collection of his Works.

The work also exists in a manuscript in Jonson's hand, now Royal MS. 18 in the collection of the British Library.
