= Daniël Mijtens =

Dutch Golden Age portrait painter (c. 1590–1647/8)

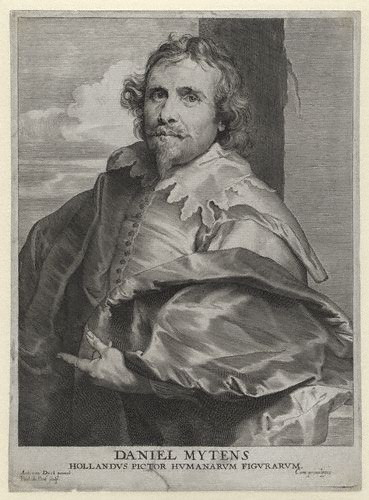
Daniël Mijtens (by Paulus Pontius, c. 1640, after Sir Anthony van Dyck)

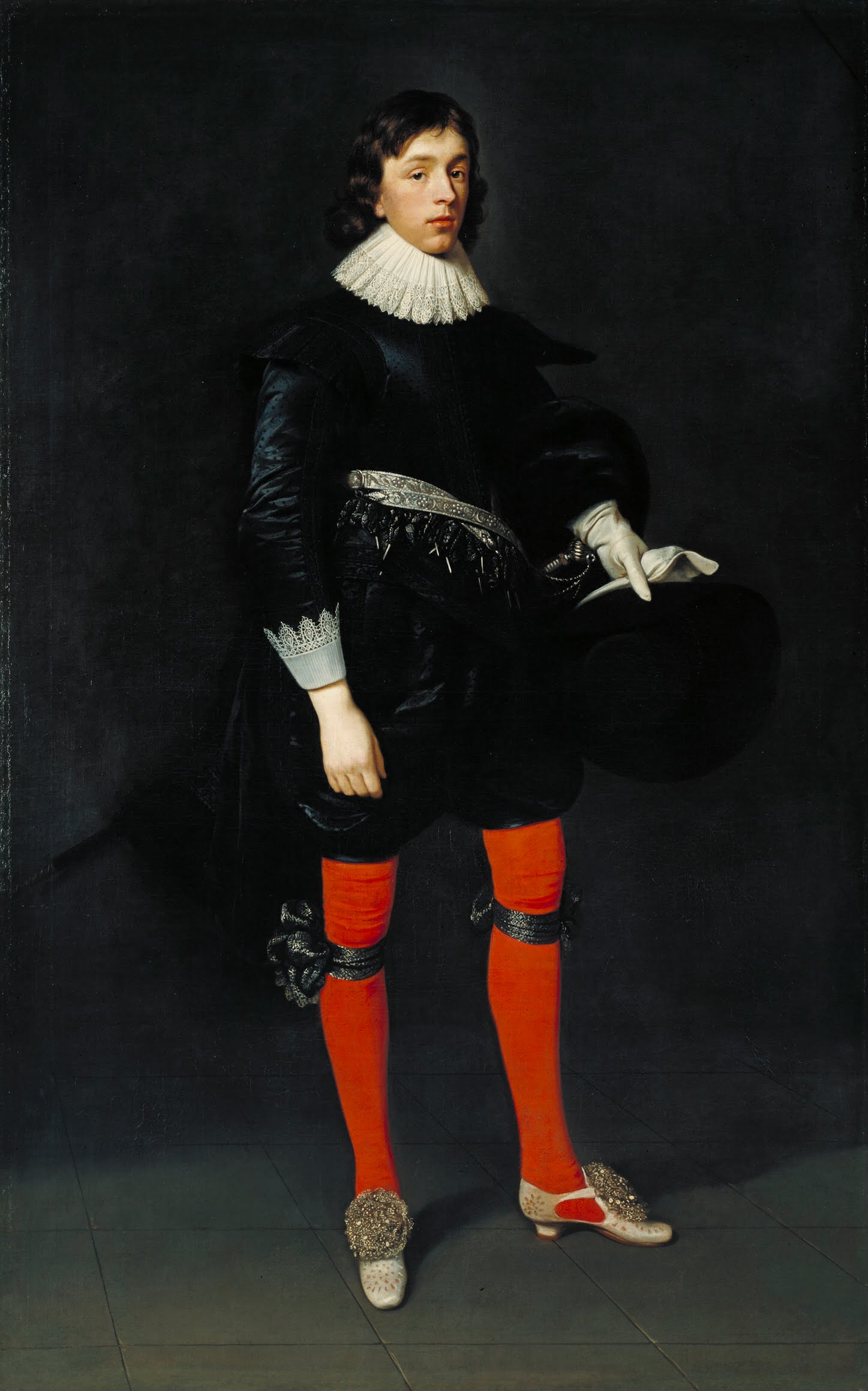
James Hamilton, Earl of Arran, in 1623, aged 17; Tate Britain, London

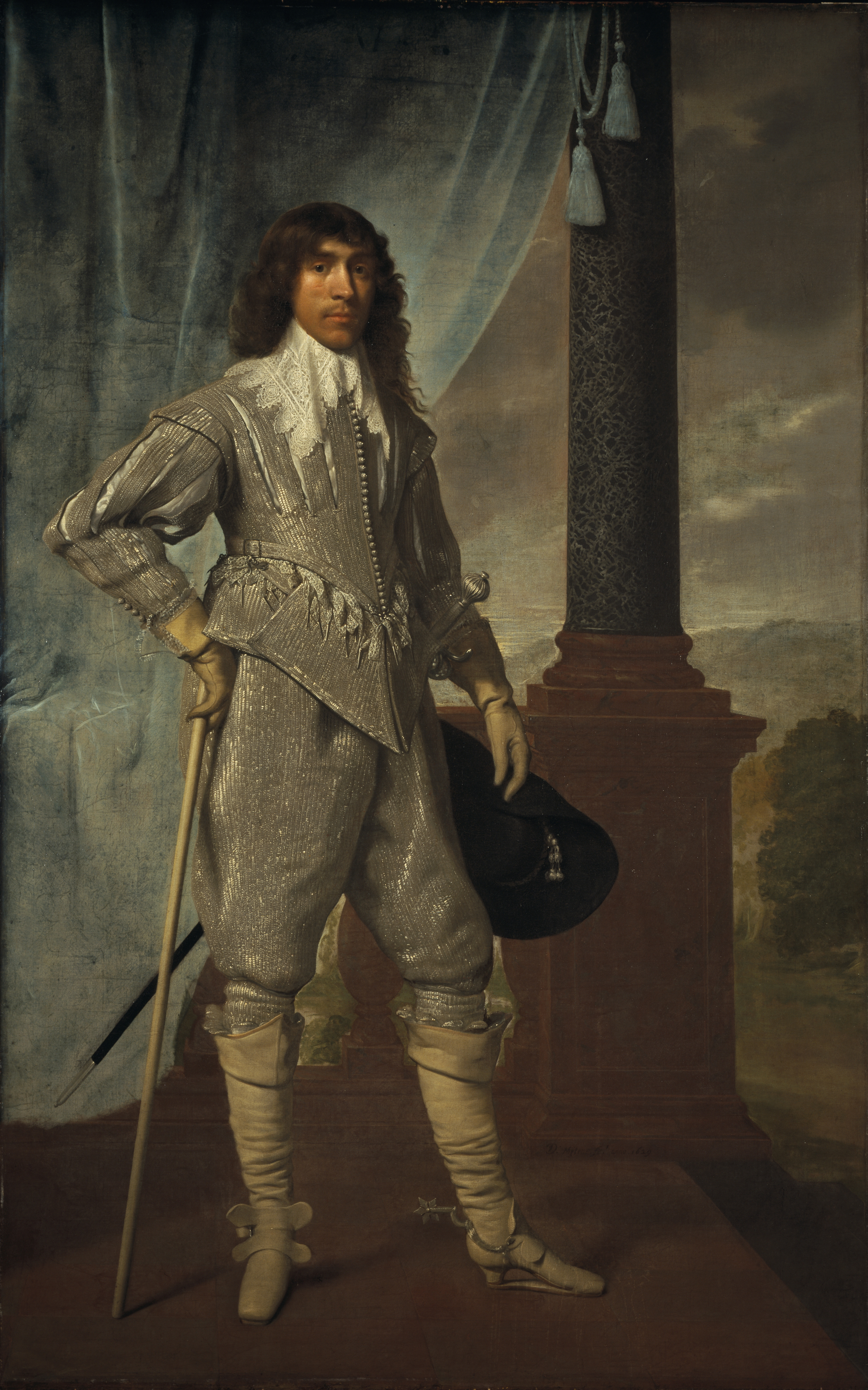
James Hamilton, Marquess of Hamilton, in 1629; Scottish National Gallery, Edinburgh

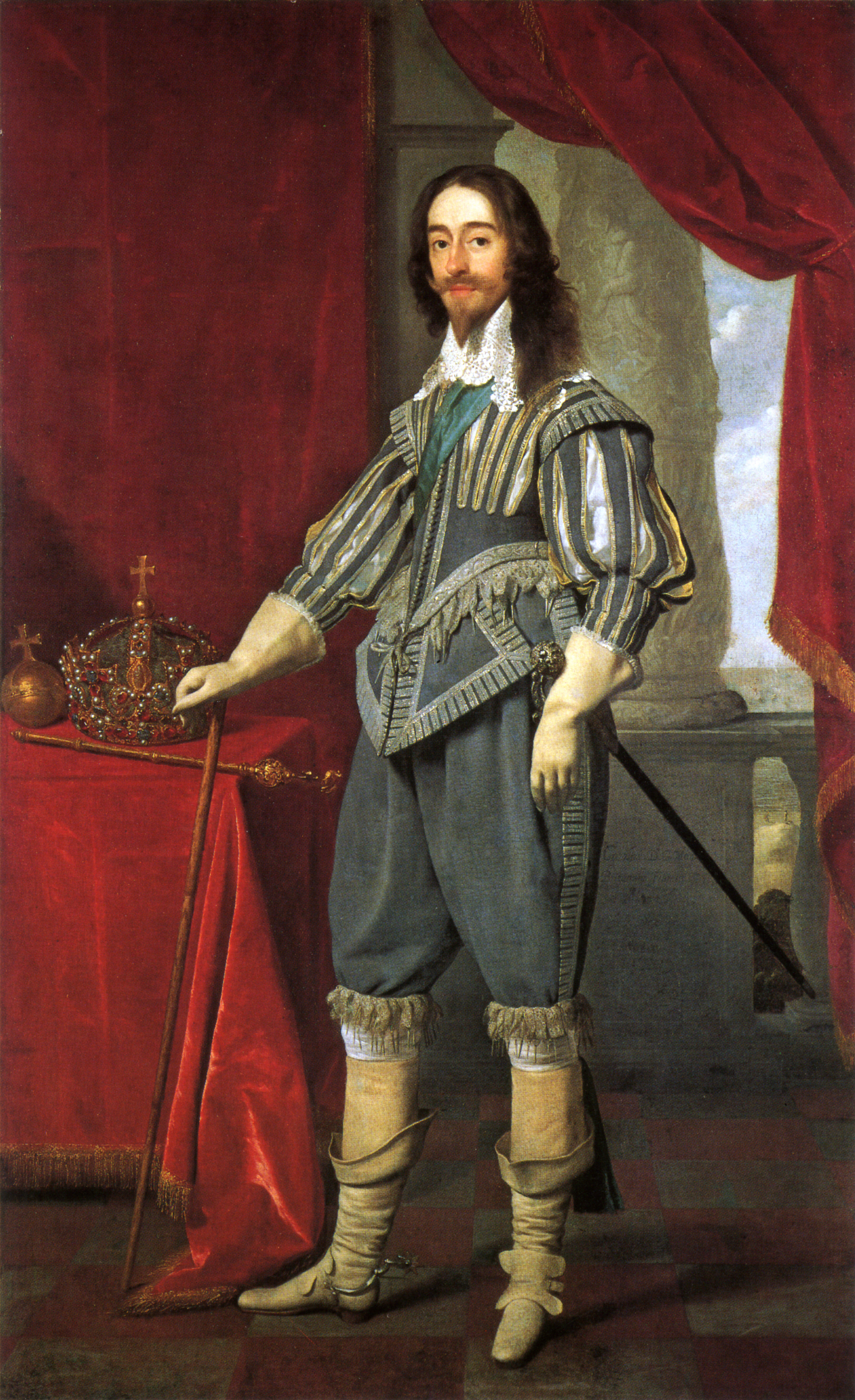
Charles I by Mytens, 1631; National Portrait Gallery, London

Daniël Mijtens (Dutch pronunciation: [ˈdaːnijɛl ˈmɛitəns]; c. 1590 – 1647/48), known in England as Daniel Mytens the Elder, was a Dutch Golden Age portrait painter belonging to a family of Flemish painters who spent the central years of his career working in England.

== Biography ==
He was born in Delft, the son of Maerten Mijtens, an art dealer and saddler from Brussels (c. 1552–1628), and Anneken Tyckmakers (died 1611). He was born into a family of artists and trained in The Hague, possibly in the studio of Michiel Jansz van Mierevelt. He was the nephew of the painter Aert Mijtens, the older brother of the painter Isaac Mijtens, and the father of the painter Daniel Mijtens the Younger. No known work survives from his first Dutch period.

By 1618, he had moved to London, where his initial patron was the leading art collector Thomas Howard, 14th Earl of Arundel. Mijtens painted the Earl and his Countess, Alethea Talbot, and was soon commissioned to paint King James I and his son Charles, Prince of Wales.

After the Prince's accession to the throne as Charles I in 1625 Mijtens produced such a large number of full-length portraits of Charles I and his courtiers, including duplicates, that it is assumed that he had workshop assistance. Two of his finest portraits are of the same man, James Hamilton, later 1st Duke of Hamilton, whom he painted as a seventeen-year-old in 1623 and again in 1629. Mijtens made visits to the Netherlands in 1626 and 1630, perhaps to study the latest developments in his field, more particularly the works of Peter Paul Rubens and Anthony van Dyck.

Mijtens introduced a new naturalism into the English court portrait, and influenced Abraham van Blyenberch, but after the arrival in England of the far more distinguished van Dyck in 1632 he was superseded as the leading court portraitist. Van Dyck demonstrated his superiority over Mytens by painting a portrait of the King and Queen, based on Mytens original, but better executed. Around 1634 Mytens appears to have returned to the Netherlands permanently. He subsequently worked primarily as an art dealer in The Hague, acquiring works for the Earl of Arundel among others. Only four paintings survive from this final period. He died in The Hague.

== Copies of older royal portraits ==
Some of Mijtens's works are still owned by the royal family. Mijtens also made copies of old portraits of royal sitters, including; James IV of Scotland, his wife Margaret Tudor, and Mary, Queen of Scots. He also made a copy of a Venus by Titian for £120 in 1625. The portrait of James IV may follow a lost original described in an inventory of Henry VIII as a "picture of Jacobe kinge of Scottes with an hawke on his fist".

Lucy Russell, Countess of Bedford, was a patron of Mijtens, and in 1618 while discussing a potential purchase of pictures by Hans Holbein the Younger, offered to have substitute portraits made as copies that would be hard to distinguish from the originals.
