= Cecil House =

Two historical mansions on The Strand, London

Coordinates: 51°30′37.8″N 0°7′17″W

Cecil House refers to two historical mansions on the Strand, London, in the vicinity of the Savoy. The first was a 16th-century house on the north side, where the Strand Palace Hotel now stands. The second was built in the early 17th century on the south side nearly opposite, where Shell Mex House stands today.

== Exeter House ==
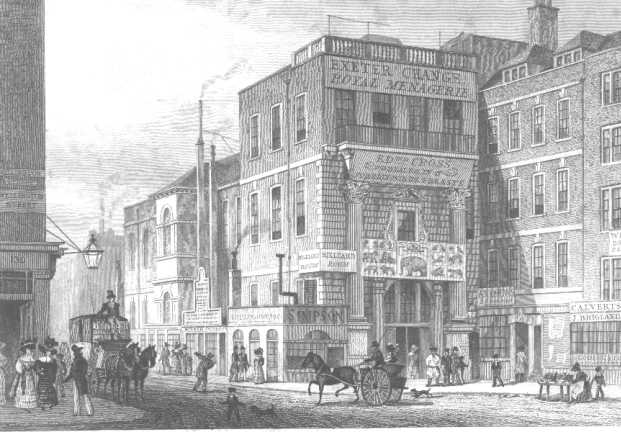
Exeter House, as Exeter 'Change, viewed from the east, in an engraving, 1829

The first, also called Exeter House or Burghley House, was on the north side of The Strand; it was built in the 16th century by William Cecil (later Lord Burghley) as an expansion of an existing house; (Note: The house, on the site of the rectory of St Clement Danes, was built by Sir Thomas Palmer, disgraced for his support of Lady Jane Grey and executed with John Dudley, 1st Duke of Northumberland in 1553.) Cecil moved his London residence there in 1560, and Queen Elizabeth I of England supped with him there, in July 1561, "before my house was fully finished", Cecil recorded in his diary, calling the place "my rude new cottage." When Cecil was created Lord Burghley in 1571, this London seat became known as Burghley House. It was a symmetrical double-courtyard brick house of three storeys, with four-storey corner turrets. A central entrance led from The Strand into the front court. (Note: A coloured plan of the house and garden as it was ca 1562–67, discovered in the muniment room, Burghley House, in 1999 (Burghley MS M358), provided the first detailed architectural information: "it is also the earliest representation of any English garden".) At its garden front, with a central bay window and corner turrets, the house looked over gardens on grounds purchased from the Earl of Bedford and the earl's fields of Covent Garden beyond. The garden included a mount with a spiralling path to its top, a paved tennis court, a bowling alley, and an orchard.

The house became the residence of Burghley's elder son, Thomas Cecil, created Earl of Exeter in 1605; thus, in Wenceslas Hollar's bird's-eye view of London (circa 1658), it is labelled "Exeter House". The structure formed a notch in the north side of The Strand. (Note: Seen in the engraving above and in John Norden's map of Westminster, London, in Speculum Britanniae, 1593.) It was converted in 1676 into Exeter Exchange, famous for its menagerie of wild animals, and demolished in 1829. Exeter Hall, built to be the largest meeting place in the world's largest city, was erected between 1829 and 1831 on the site to designs by John Peter Gandy. It was demolished at the beginning of the 20th century and the Strand Palace Hotel was constructed on the site.

== Salisbury House ==
The second, more commonly known as Salisbury House, was built on the waterfront opposite the existing house, by Lord Burghley's younger son, Robert Cecil, 1st Earl of Salisbury, around the turn of the 17th century. Some of the architect Simon Basil's plans and elevations for Salisbury House survive. Cecil employed William Portington, the master carpenter of the royal Office of Works.

John Manningham described an entertainment of welcome at this new house for Elizabeth I in December 1602. The hall was decorated with weapons. As the queen arrived speeches were given by the characters of a maid, a wife and a widow, praising the virgin state. A Turkish lady admired her linguistic skills and gave her a mantle.

On 2 September 1603 a canoe was brought to Cecil's house in London and rowed on the Thames by three Virginian Indians from Tsenacommacah. The churchman and writer Godfrey Goodman saw a suite of embroidered green velvet wall hangings at Salisbury House, which Robert Cecil had intended as a gift for Queen Anne. He had to keep them himself after she discovered he had helped King James deny her money for her building projects at Somerset House.

The property was divided by his heir, William Cecil, into two parts, of which the lesser was demolished in 1678 to make room for a new residential street, Salisbury Street. The central part of the building was converted to shops and officially renamed the Middle Exchange, though in character, the building was of ill repute, being known as the "Whores' Nest"; this part of the building was finally demolished around 1695, along with the remainder of the house, to make room for a new road named Cecil Street. The site was subsequently used for the Hotel Cecil, named after this house, and is currently occupied by Shell Mex House.
