= The World Tossed at Tennis =

Play written by Thomas Middleton

The World Tossed at Tennis is a Jacobean-era masque composed by Thomas Middleton and William Rowley, first published in 1620. It was likely acted on 4 March 1620 (new style) at Denmark House.

Middleton and Rowley conducted one of the collaborative efforts in English Renaissance drama; together they produced works, The Changeling and A Fair Quarrel. Their only masque is one of the stranger and more original literary products of their generation.

== Publication ==
A Courtly Masque; the Device called, the World tost at Tennis was entered into the Stationers' Register on 4 July 1620, and published later that year in a quarto printed by George Purslowe for the stationer Edward Wright. The title page assigns authorship to Middleton and Rowley; it states that the work was performed "diverse times" by Rowley's acting company, Prince Charles's Men.

The first edition bears Middleton's dedication to Charles Howard, Baron of Effingham, and his wife Mary Lady Effingham, the daughter of Sir William Cockayne, a Lord Mayor of London. It also includes an address to the reader signed by "Simplicity", a Prologue, and a list of "The Figures and Persons" in the masque.

== Authorship ==
In their other collaborations, Middleton takes primary responsibility for the main plot, and Rowley handles subplot materials – usually comic, but also serious, as in A Fair Quarrel. The standard dichotomy of main plot and subplot does not apply to their masque; in this work, Rowley was mainly responsible for the first half of the work, the first 471 lines, and Middleton the second half, 515 lines. The break between the two writers' shares comes just after the masque's oddest and most original feature, the introduction of the personifications of five coloured starches.

== The message ==
The masque was commissioned by Prince Charles. The intent of the masque was to influence his father, King James I, to move away from his pacifistic foreign policy. In 1620, the Thirty Years' War was in its first phase; James's daughter and Charles's sister Princess Elizabeth and her husband Frederick V, Elector Palatine had inadvertently begun the war when they had accepted the crown of Bohemia in 1618.

Despite his strong familial connection, James was unwilling to take an active part in the Protestant cause, much to the distress of many of his subjects. The masque had no discernible success in swaying James's position.

== The masque ==
The masque features the mythological divinities and personifications that are standard in the masque genre: Jupiter and Pallas Athena are present, as are Time and Deceit, the nine Muses and the Nine Worthies. There is a King and a Lawyer, a "Land-Captain" and a "Sea-Captain," and the Devil as well. The second half of the work, Middleton's portion, is dominated by the adventures of Deceit as he interacts with the other characters. Eventually Deceit is defeated by the Lawyer, and the Devil is defeated by the Church.

The masque also contains unusual characters; the Induction is a conversation among three personified English royal palaces, St. James's, Richmond, and Denmark House. And the first of the masque's three dances is performed by, of all things, five different-coloured Starches. To appropriate music – "a light fantastic air" and "a ridiculous strain" – five figures representing coloured starches, white, blue, yellow, green and red, "come dancing in." After their dance, they quarrel; White demands precedence over the others, but they resist. As Yellow puts it, "I am as stiff i' my opinion / As any Starch amongst you."

The Starches are examples of what Jupiter calls the "Deceit and Pride" of the age, characterised by "The frenzy of apparel", "masculine painting", and "Vain-glory, fashion, humour, and such toys".

== Why five starches? ==
In the second decade of the seventeenth century, Mistress Anne Turner started a new fashion. It had long been standard in Elizabethan and Jacobean clothing to wear starched white ruffs and cuffs, commonly called "bands". The famous and often-reproduced portrait of actor Edward Alleyn (to be seen here) provides a good view of the prevailing style. Mrs. Turner was the first person in England to dye these white bands yellow. The fashion became famous and notorious when Turner, an associate of Simon Forman and a denizen of the Jacobean demimonde, was executed on 15 November 1615 for her role in the murder of Sir Thomas Overbury.

When Lord Chief Justice Sir Edward Coke (to be seen in traditional white bands here) sentenced Turner to death, he specifically instructed that she should die in yellow bands: "as she was the person who had brought yellow starched ruffs into vogue, she should be hanged in that dress, that the same might end in shame and detestation." According to at least one report, the hangman too wore yellow bands as he put Turner to death.

References to yellow bands and yellow starch recur in plays of the 1615–1618 era, by Middleton and others – A Fair Quarrel, The Widow, More Dissemblers Besides Women, Albumazar, The Queen of Corinth, The Devil is an Ass, and Christmas, His Masque. (Robert Davenport's plays of uncertain date, The City Nightcap and A New Trick to Cheat the Devil, also contain such references.) The World Tossed at Tennis is unique in that it refers not only to white and yellow starch but to red, green, and blue starch too. Were these other colours worn in ruffs and cuffs in the years around 1620? The text of the masque suggests this was so, though supporting evidence is thin.

(In Davenport's A New Trick to Cheat the Devil, Act IV scene 1, The Devil claims that "I was first father for this yellow Sterch, / Which did succeed the blew...." The colour sequence, blue then yellow, is the same as given by Rowley in The World Tossed at Tennis.)

The fashion for yellow bands lasted in Court circles until the mid-1620s.
