= William Wade (English politician) =

16th/17th-century English statesman

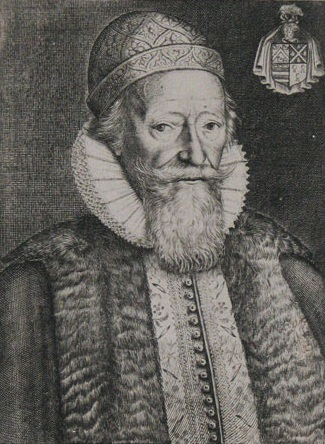
Sir William Wadd late Lieutenant of the Tower, 18th-century engraving after an original portrait

Sir William Wade (or Waad, or Wadd; 1546 – 21 October 1623) was an English statesman and diplomat, and Lieutenant of the Tower of London.

== Early life and education ==
William Wade was the eldest son of Armagil Wade, the traveller, who sailed with a party of adventurers for North America in 1536, later, one of the clerks of the privy council in London and a member of parliament, and his first wife, Lady Alice Patten.

Both his parents died in 1568, and Wade succeeded to the family property, his father's sons by his first wife having predeceased him. In 1571 he was admitted a student of Gray's Inn, and a few years later, doubtless with a view to entering the service of the government, he began travelling on the continent.

== Career ==
In July 1576 Wade was living in Paris and frequently supplied political information to William Cecil, 1st Baron Burghley, whose "servant" he is described as being. He claimed "familiar acquaintance" with the celebrated French publicist Jean Bodin, from whom he seems to have derived some of the news he forwarded to Burghley. In the autumn of 1576 Amias Paulet took Wade to Blois. During the winter of 1578–79 he was in Italy, from where he forwarded to Burghley reports on its political condition. From Venice in April 1579 he sent Burghley fifty of the rarest kinds of seeds in Italy. In May he was in Florence, and in February 1579/80 he was living in Strasbourg. In the following April he was employed on a delicate mission in Paris by Sir Henry Cobham.

Among appointments in London, Wade undertook a number of ambassadorial missions, in 1580 to Portugal; then in 1581 he became secretary to Sir Francis Walsingham and in 1583 he was appointed as one of the clerks of the Privy Council. In April of that year he was sent to Vienna to discuss the differences between the Hanseatic League and English merchants abroad, and in July he accompanied Lord Willoughby on his embassy to Denmark to invest the king with the insignia of the Garter, and to negotiate an agreement on mercantile affairs.

In January 1583–4 he was sent to Madrid to explain the expulsion from England of the Spanish ambassador, Mendoza. He arrived in March, but Phillip II refused all his requests for an interview and ordered him out of Spain, with an intimation that he was fortunate to escape to liberty. He was back in England on 12 April, and with his return diplomatic relations between England and Spain ceased. In the same month Wade was sent to Mary Stuart, Queen of Scots, to induce her to come to terms with Elizabeth. Wade witnessed a discussion with a French envoy about her dowry income, and Mary took the opportunity to complain about her treatment in England and her declining health. In February 1585, he was appointed to accompany Claude Nau to the court of King James VI of Scotland, but his appointment was cancelled at the last minute.

In March 1585 Wade was despatched to Paris to demand the surrender of the conspirator Thomas Morgan. Henry III was willing to consider the request, but the Catholic League and the Guises were violently opposed to it and even instructed the Duc d'Aumale to waylay Wade and rescue Morgan on their way to the coast. Wade, however, convinced that he could not secure Morgan, contented himself with obtaining a promise that Morgan should be detained in prison in France, but Aumale nevertheless attacked the envoy near Amiens and inflicted on him a severe beating as an answer to his demand for the extradition of a Roman Catholic from France. In August, Wade accompanied William Davison to the Low Countries to negotiate an alliance with the States-General of the Netherlands.

A year later he took a prominent part in arranging the seizure of Mary Stuart's papers, which implicated her in the Babington Plot. He himself went down to Chartley in August 1586, and, while Mary was decoyed away on a hunting expedition, arrested her secretaries Nau and Curle, and having ransacked her cabinet, carried back a valuable collection of papers to London. For this important service he was paid thirty pounds.

In 1587 Wade was again in France. During the remainder of the reign of Elizabeth I of England, he was much occupied in searching for Jesuits and in discovering plots against the life of the queen.

James I, who knighted him in 1603. employed him in similar ways, and he was occupied that year in unravelling the Bye Plot and Main Plot. Wade was Lieutenant of the Tower of London at the time of the Gunpowder Plot and questioned Guy Fawkes. For some time Wade was a member of the Parliament of England, elected as MP for Aldborough (1584), Thetford (1589), Preston (1601) and West Looe (1604).

Wade sent observations about the behaviour of the lion cubs in the Tower to the Earl of Salisbury. In September 1607, a breeding pair, Henry and Anne, had a cub, or "lion whelp". There was plague in London in September 1608 and Wade noted that life at the Tower was made inconvenient by tenements and housing built at the gate and barbican. As these houses were infected, he was reluctant to go in and out on the land side, and could only use the Thames.

== Later life ==
William Wade retired from public life in 1613, at the instigation of Frances Howard, Countess of Essex. She wanted Wade replaced with a less honest Lieutenant of the Tower, Sir Gervase Helwys, as part of her scheme to murder the prisoner Thomas Overbury, who was opposed to her affair with Robert Carr.

Wade had allowed Lady Arbella Stuart a key to her quarters in the Tower, and this was made the pretext for his replacement by Helwys. Wade was later praised by Lloyd, who claimed that "to his directions we owe Rider's Dictionary, to his encouragement Hooker's Polity, and to his charge Gruter's Inscriptions.

A wall tablet within the church of St Mary the Virgin at Manuden in Essex commemorates Wade (named Waad on the tablet). He lived at Battles Hall in the village during his retirement. Wade died on 21 October 1623 and is buried in the church. He had been a shareholder in the Virginia Company, and the Wades of Virginia claim descent from his father.

== Fiction ==
Martyn, Isolde The April King (2025)
