= Anne Turner (murderer) =

English convicted murderer (1576–1615)

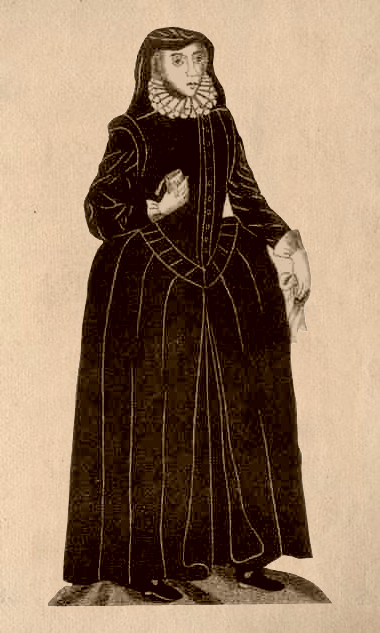
- Turner on the way to the gallows
- Born: Anne Norton; 5 January 1576; Hinxton, Cambridgeshire, England
- Died: 15 November 1615 (aged 39); Tyburn, Middlesex
- Cause of death: Hanging
- Resting place: Tyburn, Middlesex
- Occupation: maidservant
- Employer: Frances Carr, Countess of Somerset
- Known for: Complicity in murder of Sir Thomas Overbury
- Opponents: Sir Edward Coke; Sir Francis Bacon
- Spouse: George Turner
- Parent(s): Thomas Norton; Margaret Norton

Mrs. Anne Turner (5 January 1576 – 15 November 1615), known as Mistress Anne Turner, was the widow of a respectable London doctor who was hanged at Tyburn for her role in the famous 1613 poisoning of Sir Thomas Overbury. This crime is referenced in the seventeenth-century stage plays A New Trick to Cheat the Devil, The Widow, The World Tossed at Tennis and The City Nightcap.

== Background ==
She was born Anne Norton on 5 January 1576, one of six children to Thomas and Margaret Norton of Hinxton, Cambridgeshire. Later, as her reputation came in question, rumours spread that she was an illegitimate child of the disreputable London apothecary and astrologer named Simon Forman. Also considered to be a "beautiful" woman, she married a physician, George Turner, who died in 1610, and became the mistress of Sir Arthur Mainwaring. At some point she had become a "waiting woman" or "companion" of Frances Howard.

It seems that at this time that Howard had fallen in love with the king's favourite, Robert Carr and they soon began an exchange of romantic correspondence. Howard was married at the time to the Earl of Essex, and at his instance was obliged to travel back with him after his return from France to his house at Chartley in Staffordshire. There she persisted in a refusal to sleep with her husband, perhaps hoping to have the marriage annulled on the grounds of non-consummation.

Whilst Carr may have been satisfied with this state of affairs, Frances wished to marry him. However, Carr's mentor, Sir Thomas Overbury disapproved of the match, which was an impediment to Frances Howard's hopes. Her uncle, Sir Henry Howard, 1st Earl of Northampton and her ally Mrs Turner seem to have conspired to get Overbury discredited.

== The Overbury murder ==
Overbury was arrested, apparently on trumped up charges. Frances Howard would seemingly benefit from his death, which would remove the most serious opposition to her marriage with Robert Carr.

A widow and outwardly respectable, Mrs Turner was an independent businesswoman who ran "houses of ill-repute" at Paternoster Row and Hammersmith, where couples could meet for sexual liaisons. She ran a lucrative monopoly in the supply of a saffron-based starch, used to colour collars and ruffs, a fashion at the time. Mrs Turner was therefore well connected with both the court and the less savoury sections of London society.

She was thus able to put Howard in touch with Forman to provide love potions for Carr and a range of poisons, including arsenic, cantharides and sublimate of mercury for Overbury from another apothecary named Franklin. These poisons were then included in a selection of tarts and jellies which were delivered to gaoler Richard Weston. They were then left with the Lieutenant of the Tower, Sir Gervase Helwys, before they were eaten by Overbury, who died as a result in September 1613.

A few weeks later Howard's marriage was annulled and she was able to marry Carr.

== Trial and execution ==
Two years later, after Overbury's murder came to light, Turner, Helwys and all the other accomplices in the crime were put on trial, the hearings being overseen by Sir Edward Coke, Lord Chief Justice of the King's Bench, and the king's Attorney General, Sir Francis Bacon.

With overwhelming evidence against her, Turner confessed to her role in the crime. In passing sentence Chief Justice Coke referred to her as "a whore, a bawd, a sorcerer, a witch, a papist, a felon and a murderer". He also ordered her to be hanged in the fashionable starched ruffles she had invented "so that the same might end in shame and detestation".

Turner was hanged at Tyburn on 15 November 1615. Her hangman, not by coincidence, also wore "bands and cuffs of the same colour". Her body was taken by cart to St Martin-in-the-Fields church for burial.

Turner reportedly left behind three illegitimate children she had with Mainwaring.

A witness John Castle described his response to the execution, "I saw Mrs Turner die. If detestation of painted pride, lust, malice, powdered hair, yellow bands, and the rest of the rest of the wardrobe of court vanities; if deep sighs, tears, confessions... be signs and demonstrations of a blessed penitent, then I will tell you that this poor broken woman... now enjoys the presence of her and our Redeemer".

Yellow starch was said to have gone out of fashion immediately, but portraits and other evidence show that it continued in use in court circles in the 1620s.

== In fiction ==
Anne Turner is a character in Thomas Costain's 1942 historical novel For My Great Folly.

Jean Plaidy's novel, The Murder in the Tower, published in 1964, mentions Anne Turner as one of the characters involved in the Overbury Murder.

Anne Turner is mentioned in Nathaniel Hawthorne's The Scarlet Letter as an "especial friend" of Mistress Hibbins, a suspected witch. The novel mentions the yellow ruffs, which Turner had supposedly taught Hibbins how to make.

Anne Turner is a character in the 1930 novel The King's Minion (also known as The Minion) by Rafael Sabatini, which is about the Overbury murder.

Dame Ursula Suddlechop in Sir Walter Scott's novel The Fortunes of Nigel gives an account of "poor Mistress Turner, my honoured patroness" and of Turner's involvement in, and execution for the Overbury affair. Scott provides a brief biography of Turner in a "Note to Ch. VIII, p. 123".

Anne Turner is the main character in the 2021 novel “A Net for Small Fishes” by Lucy Jago.
