= Charles Maitland =

Charles Maitland may refer to:

- Charles Maitland, 3rd Earl of Lauderdale (died 1691)
- Charles Maitland (MP) (c. 1704–1751), Scottish politician
- Charles Maitland (physician) (1668–1748), administered the first smallpox inoculation in the West
- Charles Maitland (British Army officer) (1823–1891), English cricketer and British Army officer
