= George Turner (physician) =

English physician

George Turner (died 1610) was an English physician in London. He is known for his interest in alchemy and friendship with Simon Forman. His wife was the convicted murderer Anne Turner.

== Life ==
Born either in Derbyshire or in Suffolk, he has been identified as the George Turner who entered St. John's College, Cambridge as a sizar in November 1569. This George Turner became a Beresford scholar of the college on 9 November 1570, and graduated B.A. in 1573, M.A. in 1576. He took the degree of M.D. abroad.

Turner became a candidate at the College of Physicians of London on 4 September 1584. He was elected a fellow there on 29 February 1588, and was censor in 1591, 1592, 1597, 1606, and 1607. He attained a good medical practice, and Queen Elizabeth favoured him.

Turner was a friend of Dr. Simon Forman, and had at least a literary interest in alchemy. Forman apparently borrowed and copied alchemical writings of Turner's in the 1590s. Manuscripts in a special script connected to Thomas Harriot, from 1590 and found in the Sion College library, were attributed to "Dr. Turner" by Ethel M. Seaton; and so to George Turner. There was in fact another Dr. Turner in London at this period (Peter Turner). The Dr. Turner who had dealings with Henry Percy, 9th Earl of Northumberland in the next decade has been thought possible as either of them.

Considered a crypto-Catholic, Turner found that his theological opinions were in 1602 urged against his candidacy as an elect in the College of Physicians. Sir John Stanhope and Robert Cecil wrote a letter of support, saying that his appointment would be pleasing to the queen, since there was no objection to him but his "backwardness in religion", which, Turner stated, was "in no way tainted for malice or practice against the state". He was chosen an elect the day after this letter, 12 August 1602. He was appointed treasurer in 1609, and died, holding that office, on 1 March 1610.

== Family ==
Turner married Anne Norton (1576–1615), a figure of the poisoning case of Sir Thomas Overbury. His will mentioned three sons and three daughters.

== Notes ==
Attribution

This article incorporates text from a publication now in the public domain: Lee, Sidney, ed. (1899). "Turner, George (d.1610)". Dictionary of National Biography. Vol. 57. London: Smith, Elder & Co.
