= A New Trick to Cheat the Devil =

A New Trick to Cheat the Devil is an early seventeenth-century stage play, a comedy written by Robert Davenport that was first printed in 1639. One of only three surviving Davenport plays, it has been called an entertaining and extravagant farce.

== Publication ==
The play was first published in 1639, in a quarto printed by John Okes for the bookseller Humphrey Blunden. This was the only edition of the play prior to the nineteenth century.

The 1639 quarto includes a short preface, apparently written by the bookseller. This prefatory note describes the play as "an Orphant, and wanting the Father which first begot it...." This seems to indicate that Davenport was dead by 1639; but other evidence suggests that he was still alive. In the following year, two plays, Nathanael Richards's Messalina and Thomas Rawlins's The Rebellion, were printed with commendatory poems written by Davenport. And the address "To the knowning Reader" prefixed to Davenport's King John and Matilda suggests that Davenport was still alive in 1655, when that play was first published.

== Date ==
No firm evidence on the play's date of authorship is extant. The earliest evidence for Davenport's career as a dramatist comes from 1624; the period from 1624 to its publication in 1639 has been regarded as the range of possible dates for New Trick.

One curious feature is that the play contains a "yellow starch" reference. In Act IV, scene 1, the Devil says "I was first father to this yellow Sterch...." This is an allusion to the fashion for wearing ruffs and cuffs dyed yellow, which was strongly associated with Mistress Anne Turner, the woman executed for her role in the murder of Sir Thomas Overbury on 15 November 1615. References to yellow starch and "yellow bands" are common in plays written in the 1615–18 years, but seem rather dated in a play from the 1620s or '30s. (The same dating conundrum applies to Davenport's other comedy, The City Nightcap.) For more on yellow starch references, see: The World Tossed at Tennis.

== Devil and prodigal ==
New Trick naturally belongs in at least two classes of English Renaissance play. It is a "prodigal son" drama, one of a long series of plays that trace the fall and recovery of a protagonist in the manner of the Biblical parable. It is also, as its title indicates, a devil play, a subgenre that extended the influence of the Medieval morality play into English Renaissance theatre.

Earlier plays in the Devil subgenre, like Doctor Faustus and The Devil's Charter, presented the infernal influences as real aspects of the world. Later plays in the tradition, like New Trick or The Soddered Citizen (c. 1630), treat Satanic matters as spurious and fraudulent.

== Sources ==
As in his other plays, Davenport draws plot materials in New Trick from folklore and from previous dramas, more so than from the formal prose literature of his day. Uncertainty in the play's date makes it difficult, in many cases, to say which plays may have influenced Davenport's work, and in turn which plays might have been influenced by Davenport's work. Influence from Shakespeare is plain and evident; A passage in I,2 that is rich in classical allusions draws heavily upon Ovid.

The play's brief subplot also depends on folklore material. A version of the same story appears in a poem printed in Scotland in 1603 and 1622. Folktales in several traditions replicate similar plots.

== Synopsis ==
The play opens with its hero and heroine, Slightall and Anne Changeable; they are in love and plan to marry. Anne's father, Master Changeable, supports the match, but her social-climber harridan mother, Mistress Changeable, wants her daughter to wed an aristocrat, Lord Skales. The young and naive Anne is swayed by her mother's materialist temptations, and rejects Slightall for the lord. Slightall is crushed and devastated, and quickly lapses into spendthrift debauchery.

When she actually meets the lord, however, Anne is deeply disappointed; man for man, she much prefers Slightall, and is not shy about saying so. She seeks out Slightall to express her regret, but he is too deeply enmeshed in his heartbreak to respond. Anne, in deep psychological distress, reproaches everyone in her circle, father, mother, lordly future husband and others, for their faults; they think she has lost her reason.

Slightall mortgages his lands to an Usurer to gain funds to waste on self-indulgence. The Usurer tells his Scrivener how he conspires with Slightall's corrupt servant Geoffrey to drag Slightall down into bankruptcy. The Usurer's scenes allow Davenport to comment on the social and economic conditions of the day.

Slightall's bad servant Geoffrey is counterbalanced by a loyal servant, Roger, who stands by his master even when his formal employment has come to an end. Master Changeable is also a partisan in Slightall's cause. Anne's father arranges a complex charade: after a masque of infernal spirits dressed as a Beggar, a Whore, a Puritan and similar figures, Changeable himself masquerades as the Devil and draws Slightall into the standard infernal bargain. He, the "Devil," will provide financial support to Slightall in return for Slightall's soul. Slightall gains the funds to redeem his mortgages from the Usurer on the final day possible. The time comes for Slightall to pay the Devil his due: Mistress Changeable, Lord Scales, and others watch what they think is an infernal marriage, in which Slightall will marry a "shee Lamia," a succubus. Slightall actually marries Anne, to their own delight and the discomfiture of the rival party.

The drama's subplot is confined to a single long scene, III,1. Two friars, Bernard and John, pay a late-night call upon their friend, the Host of an inn. They seek shelter for the night. The Host is absent, and his wife the Hostess is ready to meet her lover, the local Constable, for a tryst. She is naturally unhappy with the presence of her visitors, and confines the two monks to an upper room. The humble Friar Bernard goes to sleep, but Friar John is disquiet; he spies on the Hostess through a chink, and sees the Constable arrive and lay out a tasty supper for the two of them. When the Host suddenly and unexpectedly returns, the Hostess hides the food and the Constable – all of which Friar John witnesses.

John makes enough noise to attract the attention of the Host, who is happy to greet his monkish friends. The Hostess, very dissatisfied, denies that there is any good cheer to be had in the house. The crafty John pretends to conjure the demon Asteroth to supply a magic meal; he exposes, item by item, the Constable's hidden delectables, which the Host and friars enjoy. Finally, John tells the Host that he will conjure the demon Asteroth in person, in the guise of the local Constable; the Host must not be fooled by this appearance, but must beat the demon soundly. Of course, the friar exposes the real Constable in his hiding place, and the Host gives the would-be adulterer a vigorous beating before the man escapes.
