= Helwys =

Helwys is a surname. Notable people with the surname include:

- Gervase Helwys (1561–1615), English murderer
- Thomas Helwys (c.1575–c.1616), English theologian
