= Trinity Hospital, Greenwich =

Hospital building in Greenwich, London, England

Coordinates: 51.4851°N 0.0021°W

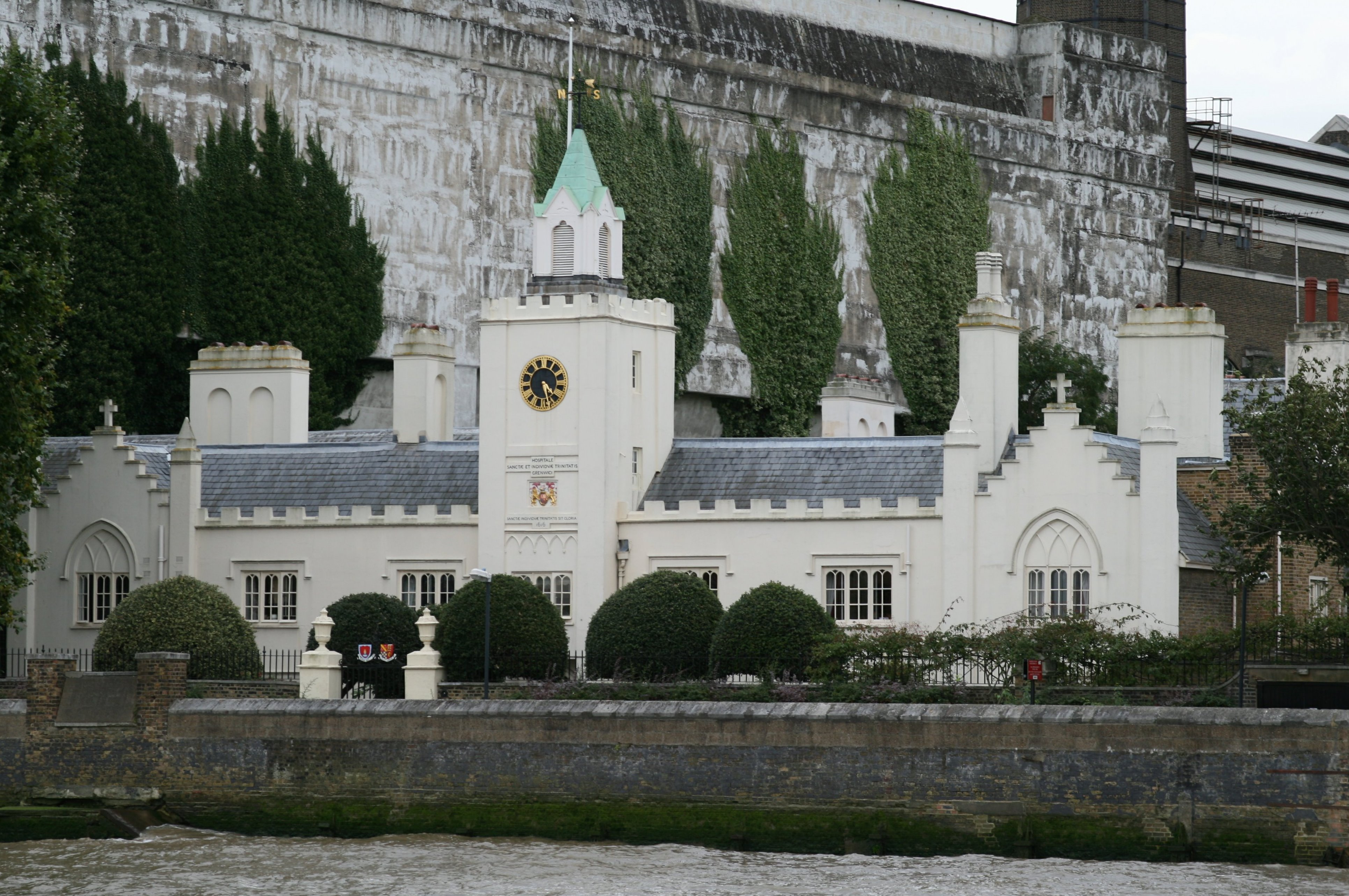
Trinity Hospital

Trinity Hospital, is a group of almshouses between Greenwich Power Station and the Old Royal Naval College on the south bank of the River Thames at Greenwich, London, England.

It was originally built in 1613–14 by Henry Howard, Earl of Northampton, on the site of Lumley House (childhood home of Robert Dudley, 1st Earl of Leicester). Howard set up his charity in 1613 for 12 'poor men' of Greenwich and eight from his birthplace in Norfolk, hence the name Norfolk College by which the almshouses were also known (it is, for example, shown as Norfolk College, on William Faden's Fourth Edition of Horwood's Plan, 1819). It was one of three Trinity almshouses founded in the last year of Howard's life, the others being in Clun, Shropshire and Shotesham, Norfolk.

It was rebuilt in 1812 in Gothic style.

It is a Grade II* listed building.
