= Robert Carr, Earl of Somerset =

British politician and favorite of King James I (c. 1587–1645)

The Right Honourable The Earl of Somerset KG
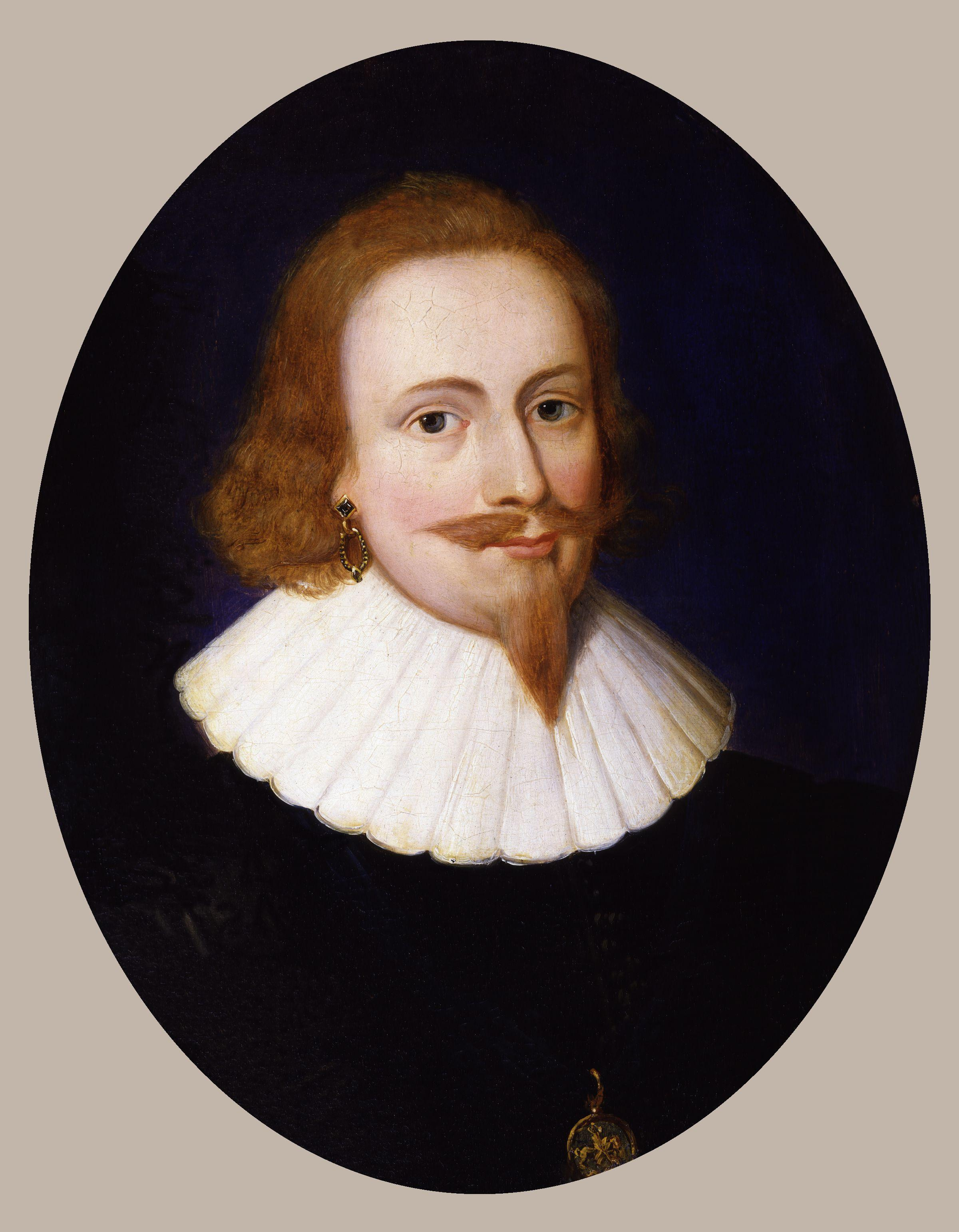
- Portrait of Robert Carr, Earl of Somerset by John Hoskins

Viscount Rochester; Earl of Somerset

Personal details
- Born: Robert Kerr; 1587 Wrington, Somerset, England
- Died: 17 July 1645 (aged 57–58)
- Spouse: Frances Howard
- Children: Anne Russell, Countess of Bedford
- Parents: Sir Thomas Kerr (Carr); Janet Scott
- Education: Queen's College, Oxford
- Occupation: Privy Counsellor; Treasurer of Scotland; Lord Chamberlain
- Known for: Poetry, murder of Sir Thomas Overbury

Robert Carr, Earl of Somerset KG (c. 1587 – 17 July 1645), was a politician, and favourite of King James VI and I.

== Background ==
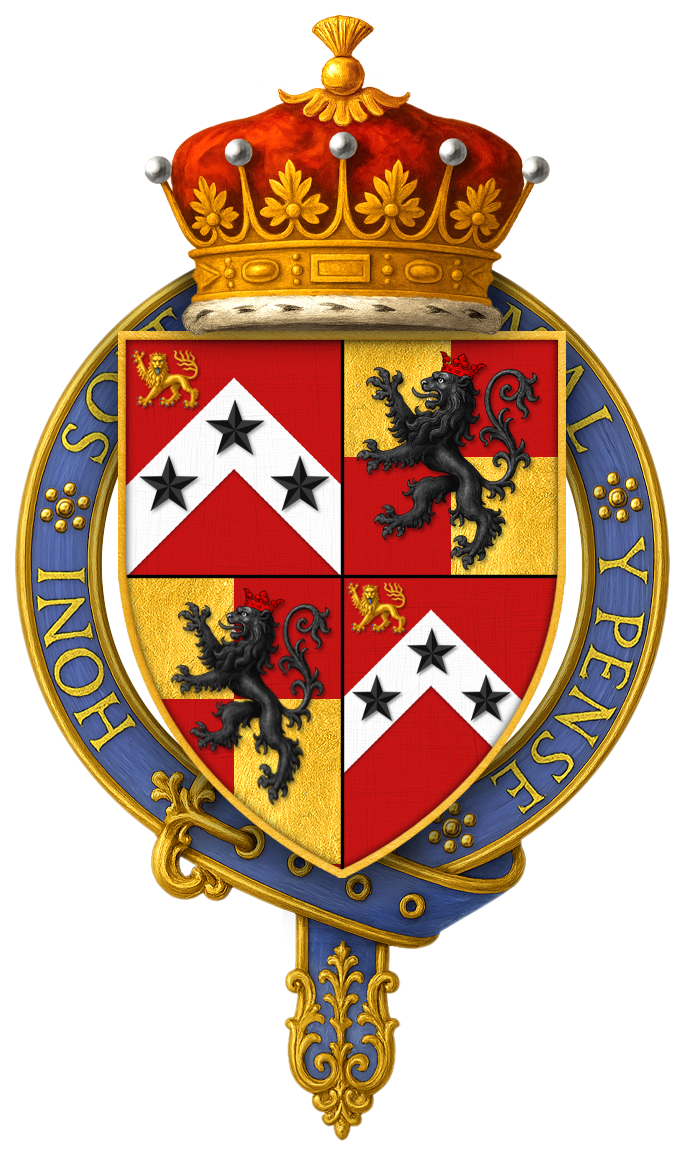
Arms of Robert Carr, Earl of Somerset, KG (1st and 4th Gules on a chevron Argent three mullets Sable in dexter chief a lion passant guardant Or for Carr; 2nd and 3rd quarterly Or and Gules overall a lion rampant Sable ducally crowned Gules for Rochester.)

Robert Carr was born in Wrington, Somerset, England, the younger son of Sir Thomas Kerr (Carr) of Ferniehurst, Scotland, by his second wife, Janet Scott, sister of Walter Scott of Buccleuch. About the year 1601, while an obscure page to Sir George Home, he met Thomas Overbury in Edinburgh. The two became friends and travelled to London together. Overbury soon became Carr's secretary. When Carr embarked on his career at court, Overbury became mentor, secretary, and political advisor to his more charismatic friend, the brain behind Carr's steady rise to prominence.

== King's favourite ==
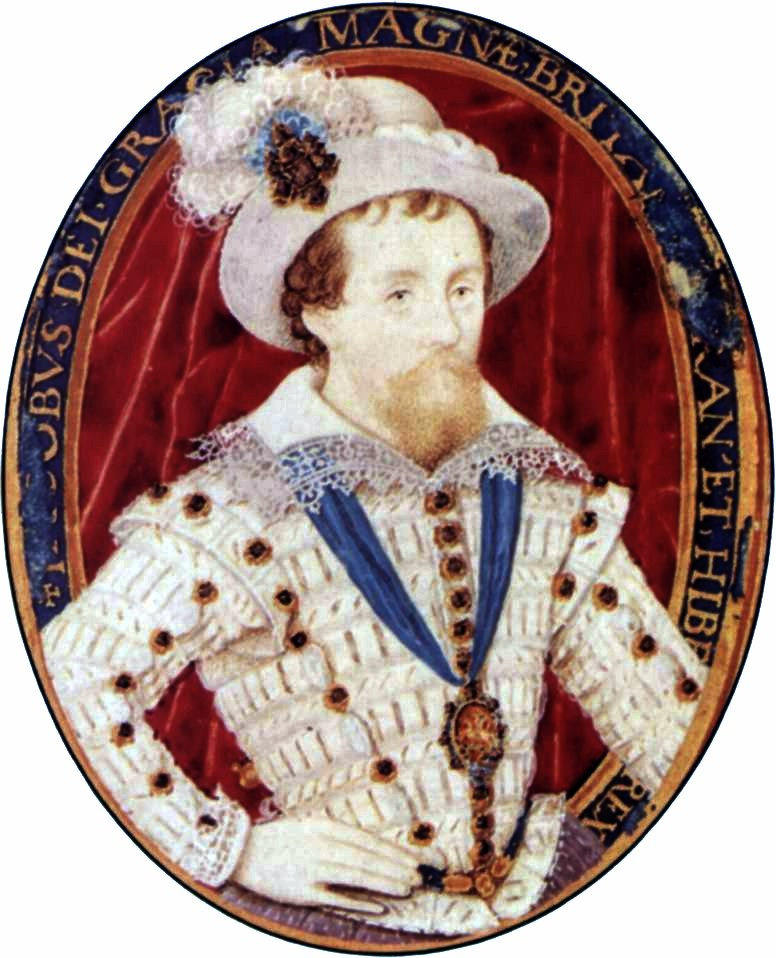
Portrait of James by Nicholas Hilliard, from the period 1603–1609

In 1607, Carr broke his leg at a tilting match, at which King James VI and I was in attendance. According to Thomas Howard, 1st Earl of Suffolk, the king personally taught him Latin. The king subsequently knighted the young Carr and took him into favour as a gentleman of his bedchamber. In March 1608, King James gave him a gold locket with his miniature picture.

Walter Raleigh had, through his attainder, forfeited his life-interest in the manor of Sherborne, to the crown. On the advice of Robert Cecil, 1st Earl of Salisbury, his Secretary of State, James conferred the manor to Carr. The case was argued in court, and in 1609 a judgment was given in favor of the Crown. Lady Raleigh received some inadequate compensation, and Carr at once entered into possession.

Carr's influence became such that in 1610 he was instrumental in persuading the king to dissolve Parliament, which had shown signs of attacking the king's Scottish favourites. On 24 March 1611 he was created Viscount Rochester, and subsequently a Privy Councillor.

Rochester and Thomas Overbury somehow offended Anne of Denmark in May 1611, and when she heard them laughing together in the garden at Greenwich Palace, she complained to the King that they laughed at her. The royal court was aware by June 1612 that Anne of Denmark and Prince Henry did not hold Robert Carr in such high regard. Thomas Erskine, Viscount Fenton wrote that "Rochester is exceeding great with his Majesty ..., yet can he not find the right way to please either the Queen or the Prince, but they are both in the conceit of this Court not well satisfied with him".

== Marriage to Frances Howard ==
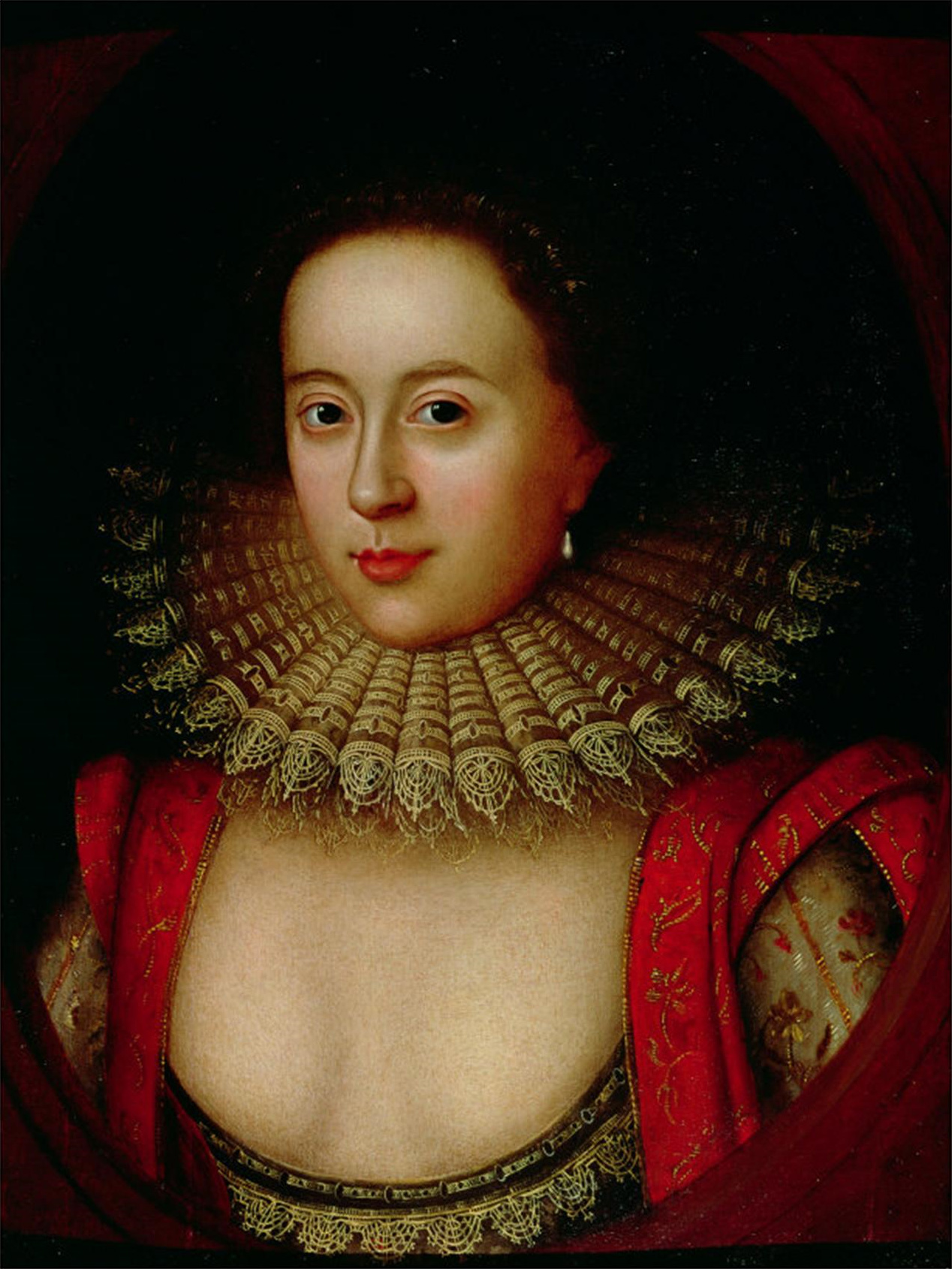
Portrait of Frances Howard by William Larkin, c. 1615

When Salisbury died in 1612, James had the notion of governing in person as his own chief Minister of State, with Carr carrying out many of Salisbury's former duties and acting as the king's secretary. But James' inability to attend closely to official business exposed the government to factionalism. The Howard party, consisting of Henry Howard, 1st Earl of Northampton; Thomas Howard, 1st Earl of Suffolk; his son-in-law William Knollys, 1st Earl of Banbury; Charles Howard, 1st Earl of Nottingham, and Sir Thomas Lake, soon took control of much of the government and its patronage. Even the powerful Carr, hardly experienced for the responsibilities thrust upon him and often dependent on his intimate friend Overbury for assistance with government papers, fell into the Howard camp. He had done this after beginning an affair with Frances Howard, Countess of Essex, daughter of the Earl of Suffolk.

Overbury mistrusted the Howards and still had Carr's ear, and tried to prevent the marriage. In order to remove him from court, the Howard faction manipulated Overbury into seeming to be disrespectful to Anne of Denmark. They then persuaded the king to offer Overbury an assignment as ambassador to the court of Tsar Michael of Russia, aware that his refusal would be tantamount to treason. The plan worked and Overbury declined, wishing to remain in England and at his friend's side. On 22 April 1613 Overbury was placed in the Tower of London at the king's "request", eventually dying there five months later on 15 September "of natural causes".

On 25 September 1613, and supported by the king, Lady Essex obtained a decree of nullity of marriage against her husband, Robert Devereux, 3rd Earl of Essex. On 3 November 1613 Carr was advanced to the Earldom of Somerset, on 23 December appointed Treasurer of Scotland. On 26 December, Lady Essex married Carr at Whitehall Palace. King James gave Somerset a sword with a gold hilt and scabbard and jewels said to be worth £10,000 to his bride. Wedding festivities included The Somerset Masque and The Masque of Flowers, depicting a scene in Virginia. On 4 January 1614, the Lord Mayor's masque, Thomas Middleton's lost Masque of Cupids, was performed at the Merchant Taylor's Hall to celebrate the wedding.

== Power, scandal, and downfall ==
In 1614 Carr was appointed Lord Chamberlain. He supported the Earl of Northampton and the Spanish party in opposition to the old tried advisers of the king, such as the Lord Chancellor Ellesmere, who were endeavouring to maintain the union with the Protestants abroad. As the years progressed James showered Somerset with more gifts, until 1615 when the two men had a falling out and Somerset was replaced by George Villiers (whom James made Duke of Buckingham). James wrote a letter that year detailing a list of complaints he then had against Somerset. Somerset still retained some favour, and might possibly have remained in power for some time longer but for the discovery in July of the murder of Overbury by poisoning.

At the trials in October and November 1615, Edward Coke and Francis Bacon were set to unravel the plot. Four people were convicted for taking part in the murder, and hanged at Tyburn at the end of 1615. They were Sir Gervase Helwys, Lieutenant of the Tower of London, Richard Weston, a gaoler, Mrs Anne Turner, a "waiting woman" of Frances Howard, and an apothecary called Franklin. Sir Thomas Monson, 1st Baronet of Carlton was also implicated in the case, but the charges against him were later dropped.

Somerset and Howard were brought to trial in the spring of 1616. Fearing that Somerset might seek to implicate him, King James repeatedly sent messages to the Tower of London pleading with him to admit his guilt in return for a pardon, and stating to George More, governor of the Tower, "it is easy to be seen that he would threaten me with laying an aspersion upon me of being, in some sort, accessory to his crime".

Frances Howard confessed, and her guilt is widely accepted. Somerset's share is far more difficult to uncover, and probably will never be fully known. The evidence against him rested on mere presumption, and he consistently declared himself innocent. Probabilities are on the whole in favour of the hypothesis that he was no more than an accessory after the fact.

King James eventually let matters take their course, and both Somerset and Howard were found guilty and confined to the Tower. The sentence, however, was not carried into effect against either culprit. Howard was pardoned immediately, but both remained in the Tower until 1622. Somerset appears to have refused to buy forgiveness by concessions, and did not obtain his pardon until 1624.

He emerged into public view only once more when, in 1630, he was prosecuted in the Star Chamber for communicating a paper recommending the establishment of arbitrary government by Robert Dudley to John Holles, 1st Earl of Clare.

Somerset died in July 1645, leaving one daughter, Anne, the sole issue of his ill-fated marriage, afterwards wife of William Russell, 1st Duke of Bedford.

== Material culture ==
An inventory of the Earl of Somerset's possessions was made in November 1615 at the request of Sir Edward Coke. The Earl's servant Walter James helped make the inventory of the forty rooms of his lodgings at Whitehall Palace. There was a bed with gilt pillars hung with purple velvet curtains and lined with yellow silk damask, tapestries of the Trojan wars and Roman history, and two Irish harps, a theorbo, and a lute. Somerset had over 100 paintings in a picture gallery in a former bowling alley, the subjects included the Adoration of Shepherds, The Wise Men, and Samson and Delilah. George More was given custody of his jewels and plate, including diamond buttons and hatbands. George More returned a diamond-set chain to the goldsmith George Heriot, as Somerset had not paid the £250 bill. Some of Somerset's tapestries and paintings were put in the custody of his friend, the Scottish courtier Henry Gibb.

Somerset may have begun collecting paintings to cement his position at court. He gave instructions to the diplomat William Trumbull to buy for him in Brussels. His agents in Venice were Isaac Wake and Dudley Carleton. Carleton worked with Daniel Nys to supply fifteen paintings including works by Tintoretto for the Bowling Alley gallery and twenty-nine cases of antique (ancient Greek and Roman) marbles. The marbles arrived after Somerset's disgrace and Carleton had difficulties finding another buyer.

== In popular culture ==
The rise and fall of Robert Carr and his relationship to Thomas Overbury are the subject of Rafael Sabatini's 1930 novel The Minion, written shortly before Sabatini's divorce from his first wife in 1931.

Laurie Davidson portrays him in the miniseries, Mary & George.

Political offices
| Preceded by Sir Robert Cecil | Secretary of State; 1612–1614; With: John Herbert | Succeeded by John Herbert; Sir Ralph Winwood |
| Preceded by The Earl of Suffolk | Lord Chamberlain; 1614–1615 | Succeeded by The Earl of Pembroke |
| Preceded by The Earl of Northampton | Lord Warden of the Cinque Ports; 1614–1615 | Succeeded by The Lord Zouche |
| Preceded by The Earl of Northampton | Lord Privy Seal; 1614–1616 | Succeeded by The Earl of Worcester |
| Vacant Title last held by The Earl of Huntingdon | Lord Lieutenant of Durham; 1615–1617 | Succeeded by Richard Neile |
Peerage of England
| New creation | Viscount Rochester; 1611–1645 | Extinct |
| New creation | Earl of Somerset; 1613–1645 | Extinct |
