= The City Nightcap =

Play by Robert Davenport

The City Nightcap, or Crede Quod Habes, et Habes is a Jacobean era stage play, a tragicomedy written by Robert Davenport. It is one of only three dramatic works by Davenport that survive.

== Date ==
The play was licensed for performance by Sir Henry Herbert, the Master of the Revels, on 24 October 1624. Many commentators have assumed that the play was written not long before that date. The play's "heavy borrowing" from Shakespeare seems to suggest that it must have been written after the 1623 publication of the First Folio.

The question of the play's date is complicated by one internal factor: in Act III, scene 3, Dorothea states that when her maid put "a little saffron in her starch," she "most unmercifully broke her head." This is a reference to the fashion for yellow-dyed ruffs and cuffs that was current c. 1615, and was closely associated with Mistress Anne Turner and her execution for her role in the murder of Sir Thomas Overbury (15 November 1615). Allusions to "yellow bands" and "yellow starch" are common in plays written in the 1615–18 period, but somewhat dated in a play from the early 1620s. (Davenport's A New Trick to Cheat the Devil, another play of uncertain date, also includes a yellow-starch reference.)

== Sources ==
Davenport based the main plot and subplot for his play on two prose works, the Philomela of Robert Greene and one of the stories in the Decameron of Boccaccio (the seventh story of the seventh day). Greene's story involves a jealous husband and a faithful wife, while Boccaccio's considers a confidant husband and an unfaithful wife. Davenport combines and contrasts the two stories to create a dialectic on marital fidelity and trust.

The plot also bears resemblances to the "Curious Impertinent" episode in Don Quixote.

== Publication ==
The play was not published until 37 years after it entered the historical record in 1624. The first edition appeared in 1661, printed by John Cotterell for the stationer Samuel Speed. The 1661 edition was the sole publication of the play prior to the nineteenth century.

The title page of the 1661 edition states that the play was "acted with great applause" by Queen Henrietta's Men at the Cockpit Theatre. The claim is credible – Davenport's King John and Matilda was performed by the same company – but no data on the play's early productions is extant. (The Queen Henrietta's company was formed in 1625, largely out of a previous troupe, the Lady Elizabeth's Men. If The City Nightcap was acted prior to 1625, it was probably staged by the Lady Elizabeth's company.)

The play's Latin subtitle, "crede quod habes, et habes," is a proverb that means "believe that you have it, and you have it."

== Adaptations ==
In 1671, Aphra Behn adapted The City Nightcap into her play The Amorous Prince. Around 1680, another, anonymous adaptor turned Davenport's play into The Politic Whore, or the Conceited Cuckold. A century and a half later, Washington Irving based his sketch "Wives," published in his collection Bracebridge Hall (1822), on Davenport's drama.

== Synopsis ==
The play is set in the cities of northern Italy. Lorenzo is a kinsman of the Duke of Verona, where the play begins; his wife Abstemia is a sister of the Duke of Venice. Lorenzo has fallen victim to an irrational jealousy of his wife; he is convinced, beyond reason, that she is unfaithful to him. Lorenzo pressures his friend Philippo to make sexual advances to Abstemia, to test her chastity. Philippo reluctantly complies; Abstemia consistently rejects his advances. Trapped in an awkward position for a gentleman, Philippo informs Abstemia of the situation; thrown together, the two become friends – which only exacerbates Lorenzo's jealousy.

Lorenzo takes the extreme step of preferring legal charges against his wife and friend. In the play's first trial scene (II,3), two of Lorenzo's slaves give suborned testimony against the accused; the court has little choice but to convict them. Philippo is banished, and Abstemia is divorced from Lorenzo. A distraught and devastated Abstemia tearfully leaves the court, and disappears.

The banished Philippo leaves Verona – and reports all that has happened to Abstemia's brother, the Venetian duke. The Duke and his army come to Verona to express displeasure at the proceedings. The play's second trial scene (III,2) reveals that one of the slaves has already recanted his perjured testimony. In the glare of open court, the other slave loses his nerve and confesses that their testimonies were suborned. Lorenzo is banished from Verona and Venice; he cannot return until he retrieves the missing Abstemia.

The scene shifts to Milan in Act IV; Abstemia, a victim of "treacherous intelligence," has been lured to a brothel. Held prisoner there, she goes under the name of Millicent. Philippo happens to visit, attracted by the report of a new girl of beauty and recalcitrant spirit, who has not yet been tamed to sex work. Before he meets "Millicent," however, Philippo is driven out with a kick by Antonio, the son and heir of the Duke of Milan. Antonio wants to be the man to enjoy "Millicent" first. Yet Abstemia is so eloquent an advocate of virtue that she chills his desires. (This material is strongly reminiscent of the brothel scenes in Act IV of Pericles, Prince of Tyre.)

Antonio is always accompanied by his Turkish slave – but the slave secretly plans to kill Antonio. The prince has a habit of switching clothes with his slave, as a way to avoid his father's spies and informers. (The two men resemble each other in build and bearing.) They switch outfits again: the "slave" (Antonio in disguise) will try to convince "Millicent" that the prince's love is now chaste and virtuous. Philippo comes upon the slave in Antonio's clothing; assuming that he has found the man who insulted and kicked him, Philippo shoots him in the eye with a pistol, killing him in revenge. When the body is found, the face is obscured by its bloody wound; the corpse in Antonio's clothing leads people to believe that the prince has been murdered.

Lorenzo has come to Milan, following reports of Abstemia's whereabouts. The Duke of Milan and his lords, searching for Antonio's killer, investigate the newcomers to the city. A distraught Lorenzo, eager to be finished with life's burdens, confesses to Antonio's murder. Abstemia learns of this, and she confesses too, to save him. The Dukes of Verona and Venice come to Milan. In the concluding revelation scene, all the complications are unwound; Antonio shows that he is still alive, and Philippo admits that he killed the slave. The repentant Lorenzo and the faithful Abstemia are re-united. Philippo gains a pardon when he produces a document that proves the slave planned to kill Antonio (which the slave conveniently carried around with him). Happy ending.

The play's subplot shows a diametrically opposite situation. Lodovico is a ridiculously complaisant husband. His motto is "Crede quod habes, et habes" – if you believe you're a cuckold, you are, and if you believe you're not, you're not. (Lodovico's servant Pambo is the play's Clown; the subplot provides most of the play's overt comedy.) Lodovico's wife Dorothea cannot resist the opportunity she's given; she sleeps with their servant Francisco and conceives a child with him. Her behavior is so blatant that Lodovico's friends urge him to take some action. Bowing to their pressure, Lodovico disguises himself as his wife's confessor to hear her confession. He expects to be proved correct in trusting his wife – but is profoundly shocked when she admits her affair and her illegitimate pregnancy.

In his friar's disguise, Lodovico gives his wife her penance: she must publicly admit to her husband that he is not the father of her child. Dorothea is appalled – but resourceful; she makes the confession at a banquet in front of her husband and his friends, but she cleverly phrases it as if she is relating the contents of a dream. Lodovico has already informed the assembled company of the truth; he prevents Dorothea's trick by going out and returning in the friar's robes, and revealing Dorothea's confession.

The exposed adulterers are punished. Francisco is sentenced to ride through the city's streets backwards on a donkey, and then have his forehead branded. Dorothea is sent to a nunnery.
