= The King's Minion =

1930 novel

- First edition (UK)
- Author: Rafael Sabatini
- Language: English
- Genre: Historical
- Publisher: Hutchinson (UK); Houghton Mifflin (UK); McClelland & Stewart (CAN)
- Publication date: 1930
- Publication place: United Kingdom
- Media type: Print

The King's Minion or The Minion is a 1930 historical novel by the British-Italian writer Rafael Sabatini. It is based on the life of Robert Carr, 1st Earl of Somerset, charting his dramatic rise as favourite of James I and rapid fall during the Overbury Affair.

== Bibliography ==
- Henderson, Lesley & Kirkpatrick, Lesley D. L. Twentieth-century Romance and Historical Writers. St. James Press, 1990
