= Lieutenant of the Tower of London =

Office in medieval England

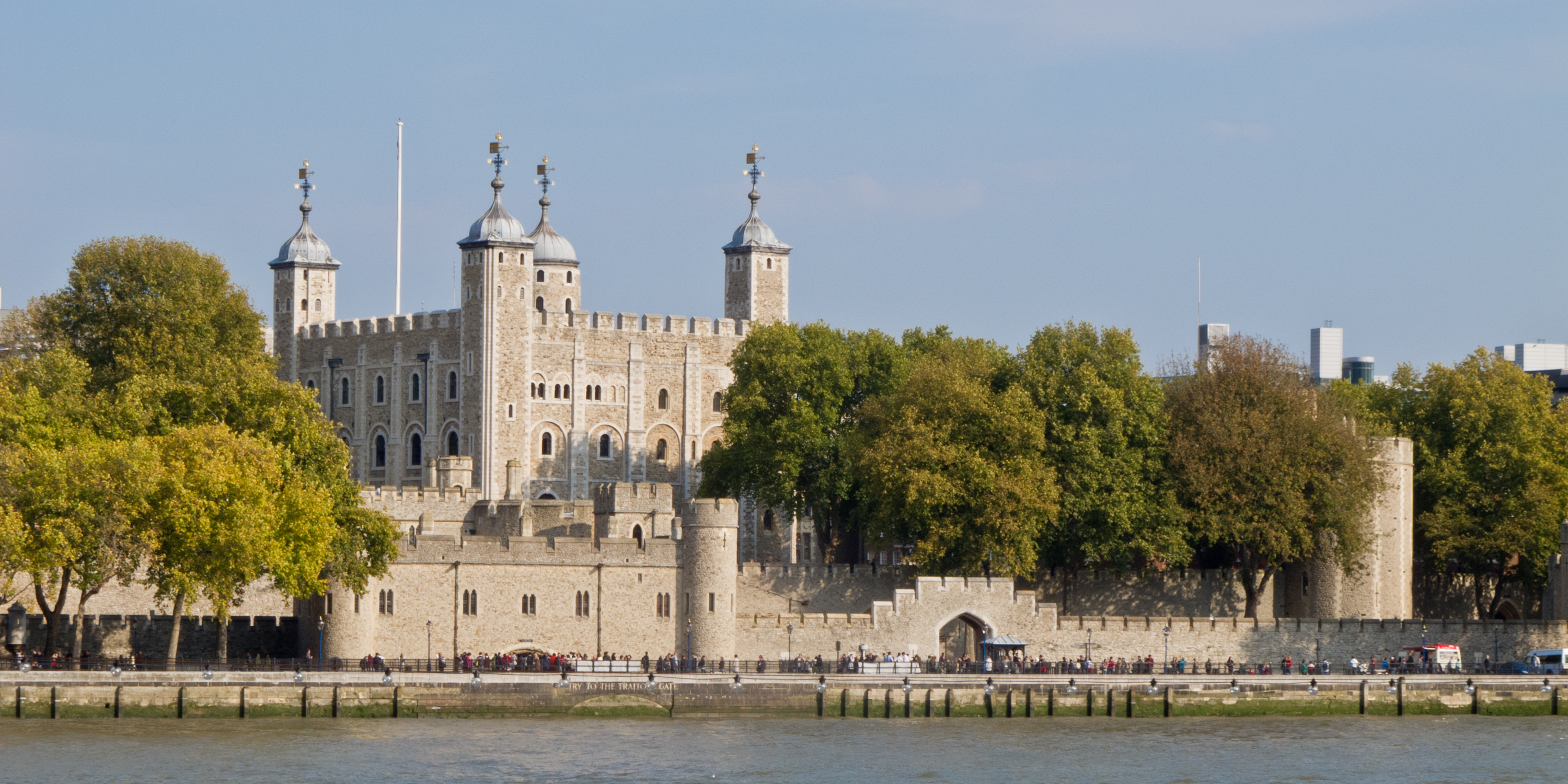
The Tower of London seen from the Thames

The Lieutenant of the Tower of London serves directly under the Constable of the Tower. The office has been appointed at least since the 13th century. There were formerly many privileges, immunities and perquisites attached to the office. Like the Constable, the Lieutenant was usually appointed by letters patent, either for life or during the King's pleasure.

The Lieutenants had custody of many eminent prisoners of state, including Anne Boleyn, Sir Thomas More, Lady Jane Grey, Princess Elizabeth (later Queen Elizabeth I) and Sir Walter Raleigh. At least five of the Lieutenants, Sir Edward Warner, Sir Gervase Helwys, Isaac Penington, Colonel Robert Tichborne, and Sir Edward Hales, themselves later became prisoners in the Tower.

== History ==
The earliest known Lieutenant was Giles de Oudenard at the beginning of the reign of Edward I, while Anthony Bek, later Bishop of Durham, was Constable. The next recorded Lieutenant was Ralph Bavant, who served during John de Crumwell's tenure as Constable.

== Holders of the office; pre-1500 ==
- 1239: Giles de Oudenard
- 1327: Ralph Bavant
- 1415: Sir Roger Aston
- 1420:
- 1424: Sir Robert Scott
- 1471: Richard Haute
- 1485: Sir John Digby
- 1483: Sir Ralph de Ashton

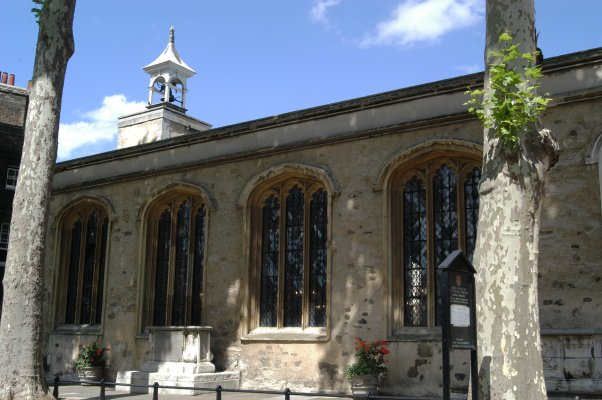
St. Peter ad Vincula, a chapel on Tower Green, is the resting place of several of the Lieutenants of the Tower.

== Holders of the office; 1500 to 1600 ==
- 1513: Sir Richard Cholmondeley
- 1520: Sir Edmund Walsingham
- 1547: Sir William Sidney; Sir Anthony Knyvet; Sir Walter Stonor
- 1549: Sir John Markham
- 1551: Sir Arthur Darcy
- 1552: Sir Edward Warner
- 1553: John Brydges, 1st Baron Chandos
- 1554: Sir Thomas Bridges
- 1555: Sir Henry Bedingfield
- 1556: Sir Robert Oxenbridge
- 1558: Sir Eward Warner; Sir Thomas Cawarden
- 1561: Sir Richard Blount
- 1564: Sir Francis Jobson
- 1573: Sir Owen Hopton
- 1590: Sir Michael Blount
- 1595: Sir Drue Drury
- 1596: Sir Richard Berkeley

== Holders of the office; 1600 to 1700 ==
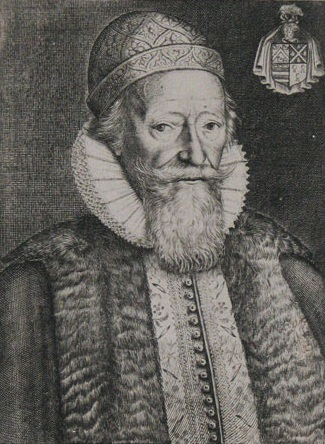
Sir William Waad, engraving after an original portrait

- 1603: Sir John Peyton
- 1605; Sir George Hervey (died August 1605)
- 1613: Sir William Waad
- 1615: Sir Gervase Helwys (executed November 1615)
- 1615: Sir George More
- 1617: Sir Allan Apsley
- 1641: Sir William Balfour; Sir Thomas Lunsford;
- 1642: Sir John Byron; Sir John Conyers
- 1643: Sir Robert Harley; Isaac Penington
- 1650: Francis West
- 1652: John Barkstead
- 1660: Colonel Thomas Fitch; Colonel Herbert Morley; Sir John Robinson
- 1679:
- 1687: Sir Edward Hales
- 1689: Sir Bevil Skelton
- 1690: John Farewell

== Holders of the office since 1700 ==
- 1702: Charles Churchill
- 1706: vacant
- December 1709: William Cadogan
- 1713: Hatton Compton
- 1742: Lord Harry Powlett
- 1754: Charles Powlett, 5th Duke of Bolton
- 1760: George Powlett
- 1763: Charles Vernon
- 1810: William Loftus
- 1831: George FitzClarence, 1st Earl of Munster
- 1833: Lord Frederick FitzClarence
- 1833: John Sulivan Wood
- 16 July 1851: Sir George Bowles
- 22 July 1876: Charles Lennox Brownlow Maitland
- 4 June 1884: Frederic Thesiger, 2nd Baron Chelmsford
- 30 March 1889: Sir George Wentworth Alexander Higginson
- 21 June 1893: Hugh Rowlands
- 5 January 1894: John Hart Dunne
- 5 January 1897: Godfrey Clerk
- 5 January 1900: Sir William Stirling
- 1 September 1902: Lord William Frederick Ernest Seymour
- 15 November 1905: Sir George Luck
- 24 October 1907: Sir Robert MacGregor Stewart
- 20 August 1909: Sir Henry Fane Grant
- 22 October 1912: Sir Frederick William Stopford
- 29 January 1917: Sir Horace Lockwood Smith-Dorrien
- 2 September 1918: Sir Ian Standish Monteith Hamilton
- 22 March 1920: Rudolph Lambart, 10th Earl of Cavan
- 29 November 1920: Sir George Francis Milne
- 19 June 1923: Sir Francis John Davies
- 30 April 1926: Sir Cameron Deane Shute
- 20 May 1927: Sir Herbert Crofton Campbell Uniacke
- 6 July 1931: Sir William Edmund Ironside
- 20 September 1933: Sir Harry Hugh Sidney Knox
- 6 June 1935: Walter William Pitt-Taylor
- 23 September 1935: Sir John Edward Spencer Brind
- 6 March 1936: Oswald Cuthbert Borrett
- 6 March 1939: Sir Arthur Wollaston Bartholomew
- 16 May 1942: Sir Sanford John Palairet Scobell
- 15 June 1945: Sir John Kennedy
- 3 August 1948: Sir Arthur Francis Smith
- 3 August 1951: Sir Ronald MacKenzie Scobie
- 3 August 1954: Sir Oliver William Hargreaves Leese
- 3 August 1957: Sir Euan Alfred Bews Miller
- 10 September 1960: Sir Roger Herbert Bower
- 10 September 1963: Sir William Gregory Huddleston Pike
- 10 September 1966: Sir Richard Walter Craddock
- 10 September 1969: Sir Richard Elton Goodwin
- 9 September 1972: Sir George Lea
- 1 November 1975: Sir Napier Crookenden
- 1 November 1981: Sir Terence Douglas Herbert McMeekin
- 1 March 1983: Sir Hugh Patrick Cunningham
- 1 March 1986: Sir Peter Hudson
- 1 March 1989: Sir Derek Boorman
- 1 March 1992: Sir Robert Francis Richardson
- 1 March 1995: Sir Michael Stuart Gray
- 1 March 1998: Sir Anthony Arthur Denison-Smith
- 1 March 2001: Sir Roderick Alexander Cordy-Simpson
- 1 March 2004: Sir Hew William Royston Pike
- 1 March 2007: Sir Cedric Norman George Delves
- 4 May 2010: Peter Thomas Clayton Pearson
- 25 February 2015: Sir Simon Vincent Mayall
- 30 August 2021: Sir George Norton

== Deputy Lieutenants ==
- 1709: James Pendlebury
- 1715: Robert D'Oyly
- 1722: Adam Williamson
- 1747: Richard White
- 1750: Charles Rainsford
- 1778: John Gore
- 5 March 1794: John Yorke
- 27 December 1825: Sir Francis Hastings Doyle
- 15 November 1839: John Gurwood
- 13 February 1846: George Cathcart
- 13 February 1852: William FitzGerald-de Ros, 22nd Baron de Ros.
- 6 January 1874: Vacant, now extinct, as the post was not filled upon de Ros's death
