= Charles Maitland (British Army officer) =

English cricketer and British Army officer

General Charles Maitland CB
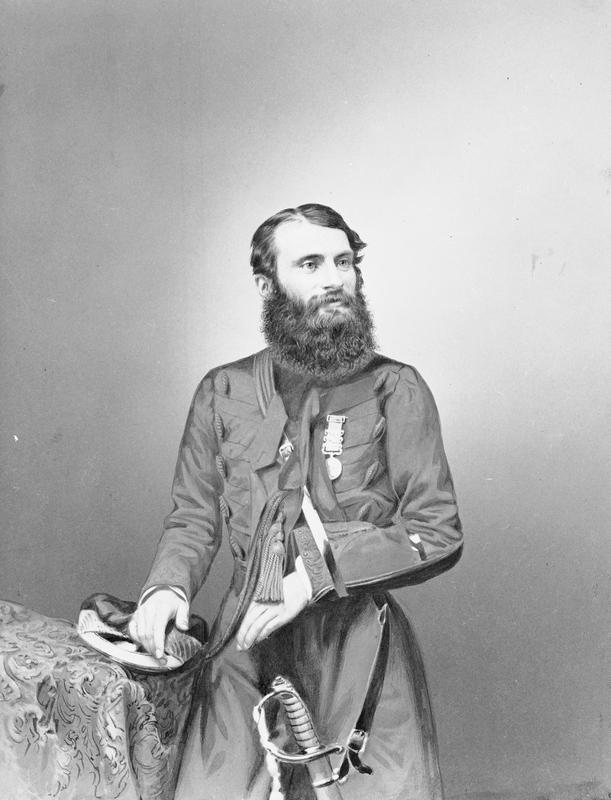
- Maitland during the Crimean War, 1854–1856
- Born: Charles Lennox Brownlow Maitland; 27 September 1823; Toronto, Canada
- Died: 5 January 1891 (aged 67); Crookham, Hampshire, England
- Military career
- Allegiance: United Kingdom
- Branch: British Army
- Service years: 1841–1884
- Rank: General
- Conflicts: Kafir Wars; Crimean War
- Awards: Order of the Bath; Legion of Honour; Order of the Medjidie
- Cricket career

Cricket information

Domestic team information
- Years: Team
- 1842–1843: Marylebone Cricket Club

Career statistics
Competition	First-class
Matches	2
Runs scored	10
Batting average	5.00
100s/50s	0/0
Top score	7
Balls bowled	?
Wickets	2
Bowling average	?
5 wickets in innings	0
10 wickets in match	0
Best bowling	2/?
Catches/stumpings	1/–
- Source: CricInfo, 4 August 2025

General Charles Lennox Brownlow Maitland CB (27 September 1823 – 5 January 1891) was an English first-class cricketer and British Army officer.

One of seven children of the British Army General Peregrine Maitland and his second wife Lady Sarah Lennox, he was born in September 1823. He joined the British Army in April 1841, when he purchased the ranks of ensign and lieutenant in the Grenadier Guards. Maitland played first-class cricket in 1842 and 1843 for the Marylebone Cricket Club, making two appearances at Lord's against Hampshire and Cambridge Town Club. He scored 10 runs and took 2 wickets in these matches. In March 1846, he purchased the ranks of lieutenant and captain in March 1846. Maitland served in the Kafir Wars of 1846 and 1847. In September 1848, he was made a brevet major.

Maitland sat as a mourner for the Grenadier Guards at the funeral of the Duke of Wellington in November 1852. The following year the Crimean War began, with Maitland serving in the war as an assistant adjutant-general to the 4th Infantry Division. Promoted to captain and lieutenant colonel without purchase in September 1854, he was seriously wounded at the Battle of Inkerman on 5 November 1854. For his service in the war he was appointed to the Legion of Honour by France in August 1856, in addition to being decorated in March 1858 by the Ottoman Empire with the Order of the Medjidie, 5th Class. In February 1860, he was promoted to brevet colonel. In September 1868, he was appointed major of the Royal Hospital Chelsea, an appointment he held until 1874 when he was promoted to major-general.

Maitland was made a Companion to the Order of the Bath in July 1876 and in the same year he was appointed Lieutenant of the Tower of London, holding the position until he resigned in 1884. He was promoted to lieutenant-general in October 1877. By 1884 he was the colonel of the Wiltshire Regiment and was promoted to general in December of that year. He retired from active service in March 1886. Maitland died at his residence in the Hampshire village of Crookham on 5 January 1891.
