= Henry Howard, 1st Earl of Northampton =

English aristocrat and courtier

The Right Honourable The Earl of Northampton KG
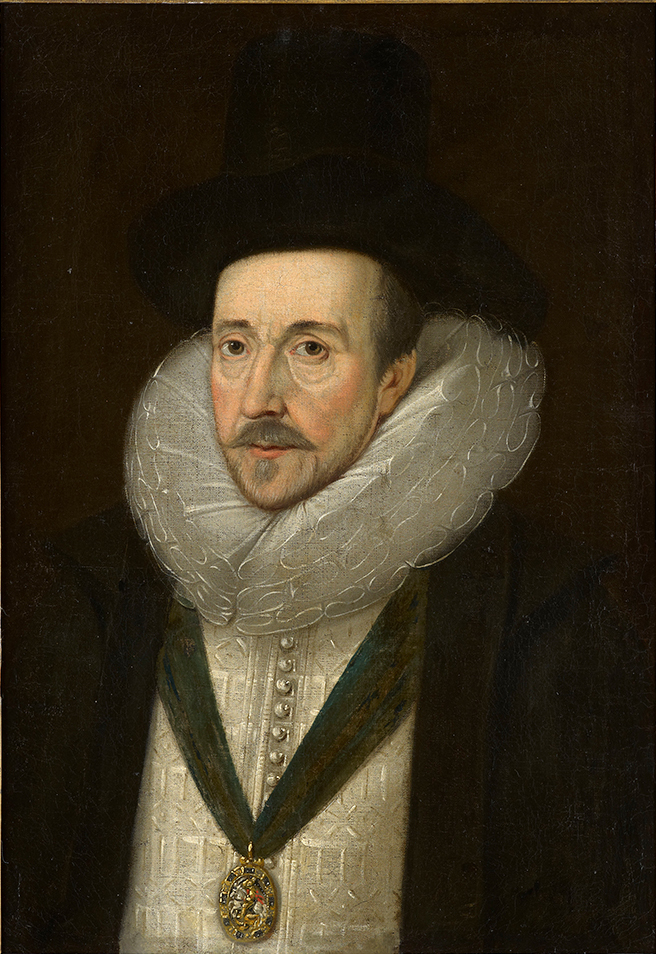
- Henry Howard, Lord Warden of the Cinque Ports, since 1 January 1604 and Earl of Northampton since 13 March 1604

First Lord of the Treasury
- In office 1612–1613
- Preceded by: The Earl of Salisbury
- Succeeded by: The Viscount Brackley

Lord Privy Seal
- In office 1612–1613
- Preceded by: The Earl of Salisbury
- Succeeded by: The Earl of Somerset

Personal details
- Born: 25 February 1540 Shotesham, Norfolk, England
- Died: 15 June 1614 (aged 74) Charing Cross, London, England
- Parent(s): Henry Howard, Earl of Surrey; Frances de Vere
- Religion: Roman Catholicism

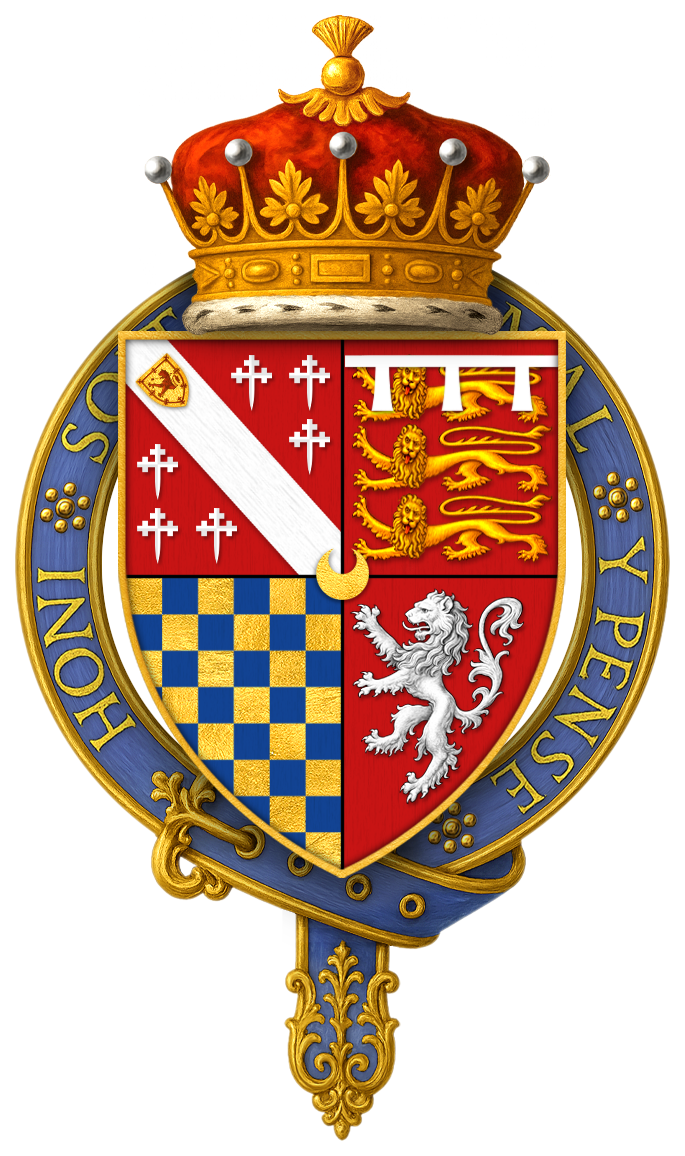
Coat of arms of Sir Henry Howard, Earl of Northampton, KG. The crescent in the family coat of arms is because he was the second son

Henry Howard, 1st Earl of Northampton KG (25 February 1540 – 15 June 1614) was an English aristocrat and courtier. He was suspected throughout his life of being Roman Catholic, and went through periods of royal disfavour, in which his reputation suffered greatly. He was distinguished for learning, artistic culture and his public charities. He built Northumberland House in London and superintended the construction of the fine house of Audley End. He founded and planned several hospitals. Francis Bacon included three of his sayings in his Apophthegms, and chose him as "the learnedest councillor in the kingdom to present to the king his Advancement of Learning." After his death, it was discovered that he had been involved in the murder of Sir Thomas Overbury.

== Early life ==
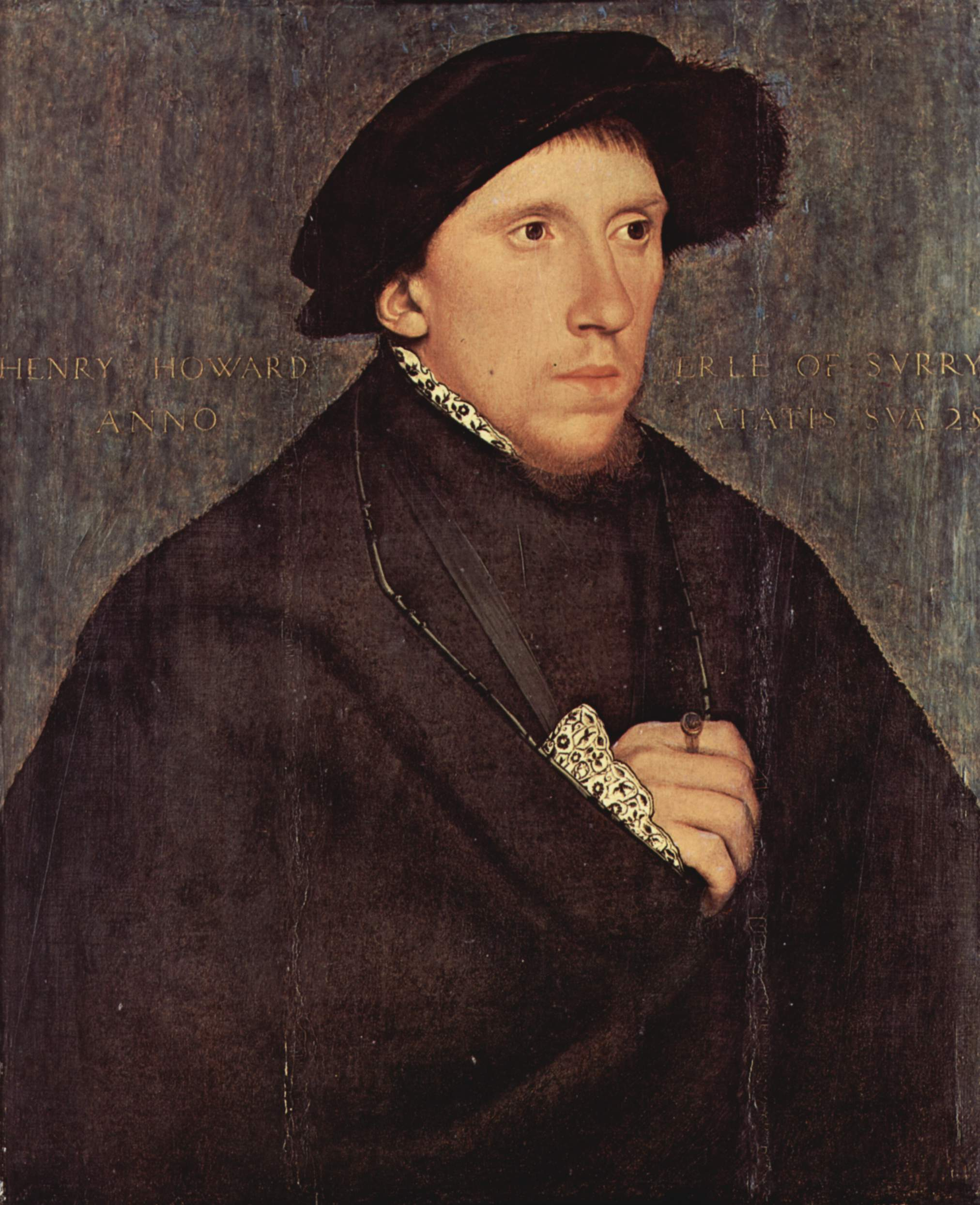
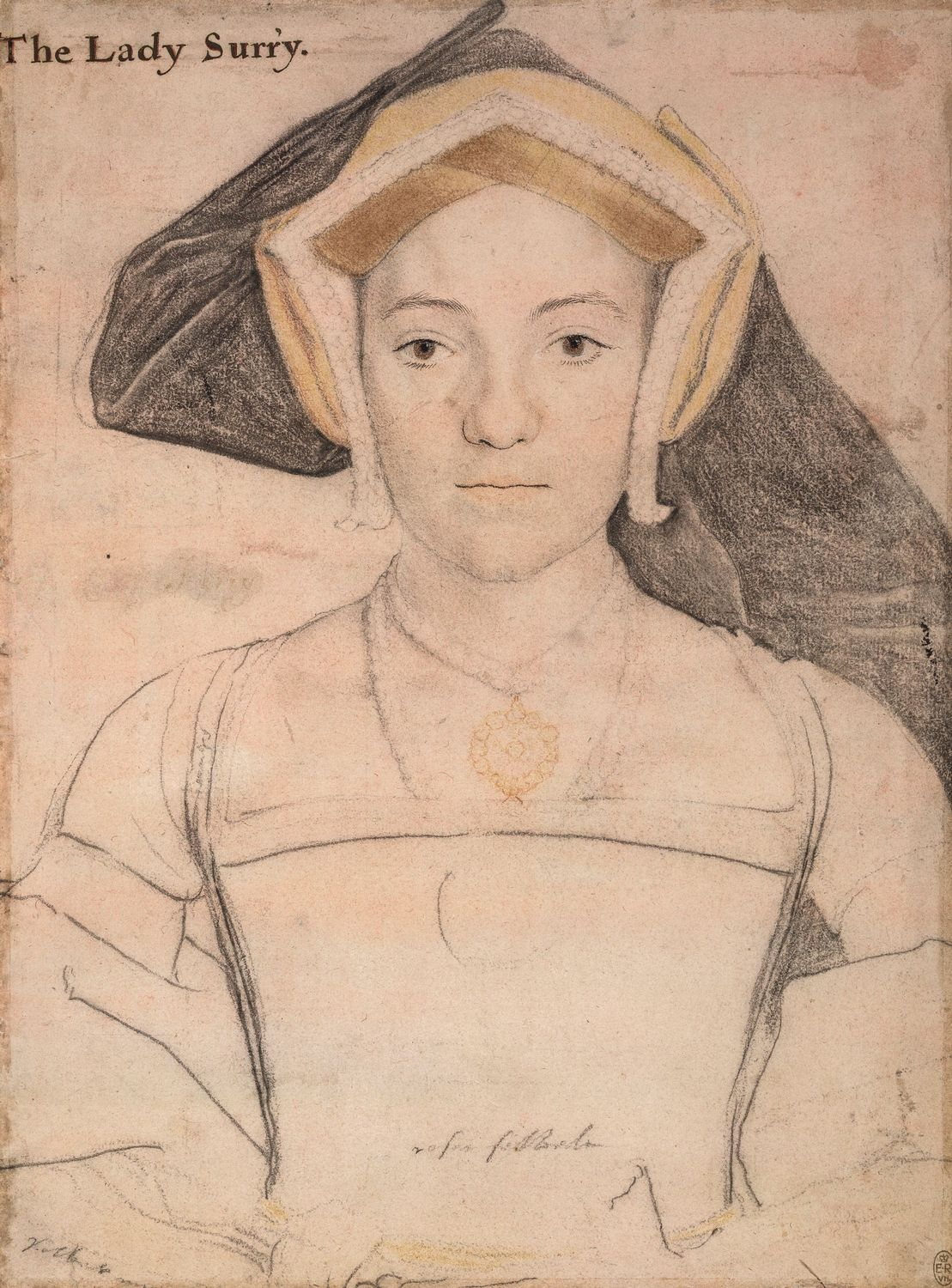
Henry Howard, Earl of Surrey and Frances de Vere, Henry's parents
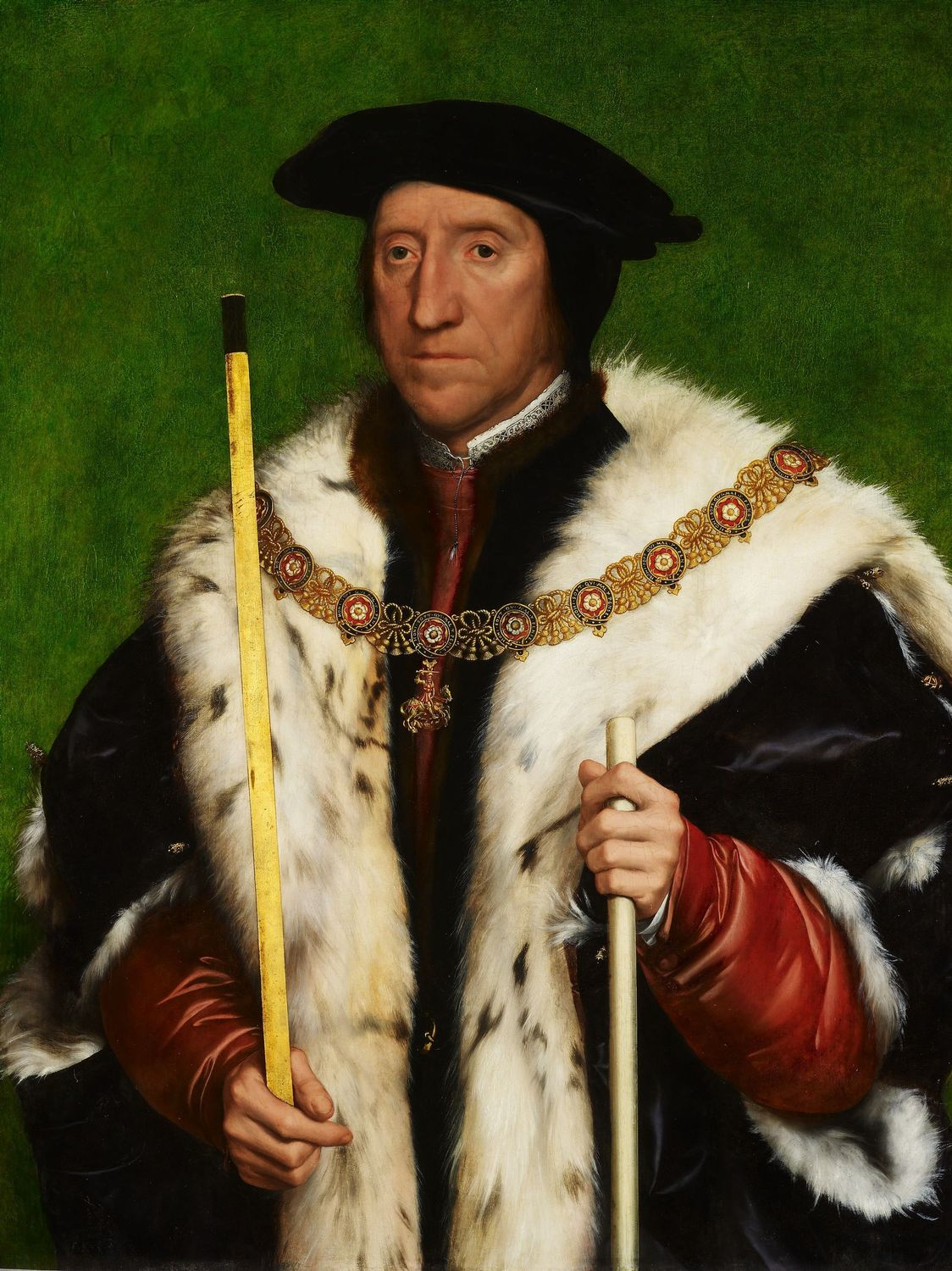
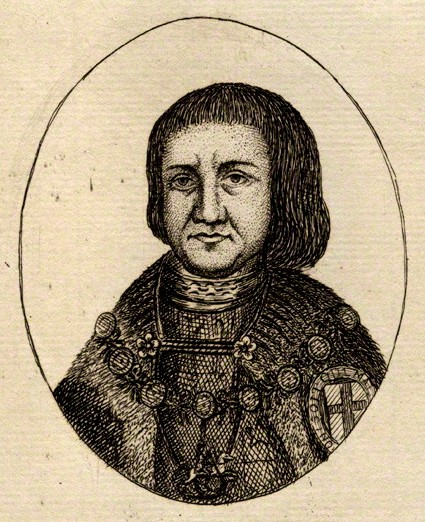
Thomas Howard, 3rd Duke of Norfolk and John de Vere, 15th Earl of Oxford, Henry's paternal and maternal grandfathers

Howard was born at Shottesham, Norfolk, on 25 February 1540, being the third of five children born to Henry Howard, Earl of Surrey and his wife, Lady Frances de Vere. His paternal grandparents were Thomas Howard, 3rd Duke of Norfolk, and Elizabeth Stafford. His maternal grandparents were John de Vere, 15th Earl of Oxford, and Elizabeth Trussell. His older siblings were Thomas born 1536 or 1538 and Jane, born 1533 or 1537 and his younger sisters were Katherine, born 1543 and Margaret, born in 1547 shortly after her father's execution. Between his maternal and paternal families, the religious differences were notable: his maternal grandfather was a supporter of the Reformation and was the first Protestant earl of Oxford, whereas his paternal grandfather was the premier Roman Catholic nobleman of England although he had complied with the changes in the governance of the Church of England brought about by Henry VIII, and served the King in suppressing rebellion against those changes.

Howard's father, the Earl of Surrey, a Catholic but with reformist leanings, was heir to the 3rd Duke, and thereby destined to become the future 4th Duke; but that changed at the end of 1546 when Surrey quartered the royal arms of Edward the Confessor on his own coat of arms, incurring the fury of Henry VIII. Through his great-grandfather John Howard, 1st Duke of Norfolk (1483 creation), Surrey was a descendant of Thomas of Brotherton, 1st Earl of Norfolk, the sixth son of King Edward I; and the arms of the Howard ancestor Thomas de Mowbray, 1st Duke of Norfolk (1397 creation) show that Surrey was entitled to bear Edward the Confessor's arms but to do so was an act of pride, and provocative in the eyes of the Crown. Henry was also possibly influenced by the Seymours, who were enemies of the Howard family, supporters of Protestantism and related to Henry's son Prince Edward because the Prince was the son of Jane Seymour, Henry's third wife. Henry, who was increasingly unwell, became convinced that Surrey and his father planned to usurp the crown from Edward in order to reverse the Reformation and thus return the English Church to papal jurisdiction. He ordered the arrest of the Duke and his son, both of them being tried for high treason and later sentenced to death; Surrey was executed on 19 January 1547. The Duke's execution was scheduled for 28 January but did not take place because Henry VIII died in the early hours of the same day. The Privy Council made a decision not to inaugurate the new reign with bloodshed, but Howard remained a prisoner in the Tower of London for the next six years, with most of his property and titles forfeit to the Crown.

Surrey initially entrusted the education of his children to the Dutch physician and classical scholar Hadrianus Junius (the 3rd Duke and Surrey were patrons of the Dutchman), but following his patron's fall from grace, Junius lost his work as tutor to the Howard children. After Surrey's death, his sister Mary Howard, Dowager Duchess of Richmond took over the care of his children and John Foxe, the Protestant martyrologist was employed to be their tutor, at the suggestion of Lord Wentworth. During that time, they lived in Reigate Castle, one of the residences belonging to the 3rd Duke. From Foxe, the children learned Greek and Latin to a level where they "could compete with the most learned men of the age". Despite being educated by Foxe, both Henry and his siblings were Catholics, as were most of his paternal family, who remained loyal to the Roman Church during the turmoil of the Reformation. His father fell out of favor in part because he had been a Catholic, and his grandfather remained a prisoner in the Tower throughout the reign of Edward VI, being released and pardoned in August 1553, shortly after the Catholic Queen Mary I ascended the throne. As soon as the 3rd Duke was released, he took over the upbringing of Henry and his siblings, dismissing Foxe, who soon had to go into exile in various countries of Continental Europe to escape the anti-Protestant measures taken by Queen Mary.

Subsequently both Henry and his older brother Thomas studied with John White, Bishop of Lincoln; when White was elected Bishop of Winchester in July 1556, Henry followed his tutor to Winchester. While with White, Howard read largely in philosophy, civil law, divinity, and history. On Mary's death and Queen Elizabeth's accession, White was deprived of his bishopric, and Elizabeth undertook the charge of Howard's education. Henry was a second cousin of Elizabeth through her maternal grandmother, Lady Elizabeth Howard, sister of the 3rd Duke and mother of Anne Boleyn. He was restored in blood 8 May 1559, following a Bill in the House of Lords in April that year. At the queen's expense he proceeded to King's College, Cambridge, where he graduated M. A. in 1564. He afterwards joined Trinity Hall, read Latin lectures on rhetoric and civil law in public, and applied to a friend in London for a master to teach him the lute. Subsequently, in 1568 he was incorporated M.A., at Oxford.

== Under suspicion ==
He protested in 1568 to Lord Burghley that his religious views were needlessly suspected, and wrote a treatise on natural and moral philosophy for his youngest sister, Katherine, wife of Henry Berkeley, 7th Baron Berkeley, dated from Trinity Hall 6 August 1569; she supported him in some hard times. It was rumoured that he contemplated taking holy orders in the vague hope of succeeding Thomas Young as Archbishop of York. He came to court about 1570 at a low ebb, but the intrigues of which his brother, the Duke of Norfolk, was suspected at the time further depressed his prospects. When Norfolk was arrested in September 1571, accused of being involved in the Ridolfi plot to overthrow Elizabeth and then release Mary I Stewart, Queen of Scots from her imprisonment to marry her and jointly accede to the English throne, Laurence Bannister, one of the Duke's confidential agents, testified that Henry was the one who really intended to marry the former Scottish queen. He was arrested, but, after repeated examinations, established his innocence to Elizabeth's satisfaction, was readmitted to court, and was granted a yearly pension. However, it had been generally rumored that it was the bad advice given by Henry that ended up causing the ruin of his brother Thomas' career.

On 16 January 1572, Norfolk was tried for high treason and sentenced to death. Following the brother execution on 2 June that year, Howard retired to Audley End, where he took charge of the upbringing and education of his orphaned nephews and niece: Philip, Thomas, William and Margaret. He tried by frequent letters to Burghley and to Christopher Hatton to keep himself in favour with the queen's ministers, and managed to offer satisfactory explanations when it was reported in 1574 that he was exchanging tokens with Mary, Queen of Scots. He supplied her for many years with political information, but, according to his own account, gave her prudent advice. Howard sought to regain Elizabeth's favour by grossly flattering her in long petitions. About 1580 he circulated a manuscript tract in support of the scheme for the marriage of Elizabeth with François, Duke of Anjou, in answer to John Stubbe's Discoverie of a Gaping Gulf (1579), and at Burghley's request began a reply to a pamphlet denouncing female government, which he completed in 1589. In 1582 his cousin Edward de Vere, 17th Earl of Oxford, quarrelled with him, and revived the charges of heresy and of treasonable correspondence with Mary. He was again arrested, and defended himself at length in a letter to Elizabeth, in which he admitted that he had taken part in Roman Catholic worship owing to conscientious difficulties on the sacramentary, but denied that he could win Mary Stuart's favour. He was soon set free, and, retiring to St. Albans, spent a year (1582–3) in writing his Preservative against the Poison of supposed Prophecies, a learned attack on judicial astrology, dedicated to Francis Walsingham, and said to have been suggested by the astrological exploits of Richard Harvey. The book was suspected of apparent heresies and concealed treason, and in 1583, after the discovery of the Throckmorton Plot, Howard was sent to the Fleet Prison. He complained to Hatton of harsh treatment. Mary, it was now asserted, had sent him a ring with a message. Burghley declined to intervene in his behalf, but by the favour of Burghley's son Robert Cecil he was sent on parole to the house of Sir Nicholas Bacon at Redgrave, Suffolk. On 19 July 1585 he wrote from there to Burghley, begging permission to visit the wells at Warwick for the benefit of his health. He was said to have travelled in Italy, visiting Florence and Rome. In 1587 his repeated requests to take an active part in resisting the threatened Spanish attack were refused. At the time he had few economic resources to help him live except for his pension, which was paid to him irregularly.

== In favour under James I ==
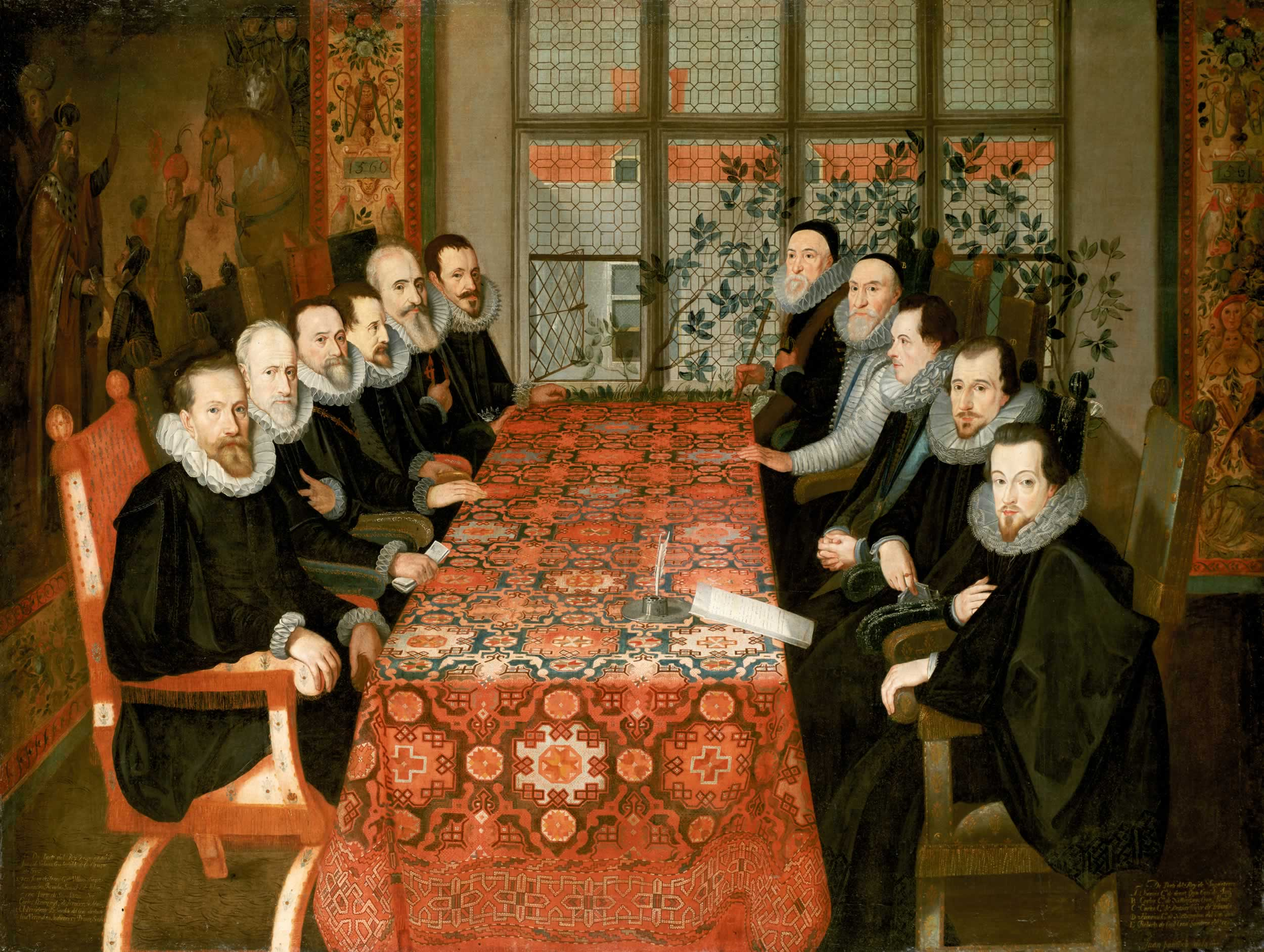
The Somerset House Conference for the 1604 treaty. Northampton sits second from the right. Charles Howard of Effingham, Henry's cousin, is closest to the window in the right row.

He attached himself both to Lord Essex and to Robert Cecil, and through the influence of the latter was in 1600 again received by Elizabeth. At the close of the Queen's reign he joined with Cecil in courting James VI, the heir to the English throne who was reigning in Scotland (in fact James suggested Howard as a trusted intermediary with Cecil). James sent him a jewel with three precious stones including a ruby. Howard sent long letters of advice, which James termed "Asiatic and endless volumes". In their correspondence, Howard's identity was concealed as number "3". He had success in intriguing against Sir Walter Raleigh and other rivals. On James's accession in 1603, Howard received a multitude of favours.

Howard helped his great-nephew, Thomas Howard, Lord Maltravers to regain royal favour following the Scottish monarch's accession to the English throne as James I. Maltravers and his mother, the widowed Countess of Arundel had suffered economic and political difficulties in the 1580s and 1590s due to their Catholicism and the attainder of the 13th Earl in 1589 following his conviction for treason, which led to forfeiture of his title and property. In 1604, Thomas was able to regain the Earldom of Arundel and estates.

In 1603 he was made a Privy Counsellor, on 1 January 1604 Lord Warden of the Cinque Ports, and on 13 March Earl of Northampton and Baron Marnhull, of Marnhull in the County of Dorset; on 24 February 1605 he was given the Garter and on 29 April was appointed Lord Privy Seal. In 1609 he was elected High Steward of the University of Oxford, and in 1612 Chancellor of the University of Cambridge. The same year he was appointed one of the Commissioners of the Treasury. He was one of the judges at the trials of Walter Raleigh and Lord Cobham in 1603, of Guy Fawkes in 1605, and of Henry Garnet in 1606, in each case pressing for a conviction.

In 1604 he was one of the commissioners who composed the peace treaty with Spain. Howard organised the welcome of the Spanish ambassador, Juan Fernández de Velasco y Tovar, 5th Duke of Frías, Constable of Castile, who came to sign the treaty in August. The Constable was brought up the Thames in a boat, admiring the sights, including Anne of Denmark and her companions who attended in a barge near the Tower of London wearing black masks. Howard received a pension of £1000 from the Spanish Court.

In 1604, Howard called the playwright Ben Jonson before the Privy Council, accusing him of popery and treason in Sejanus. In 1610 he received a royal grant of territory in Newfoundland, and the London and Bristol Company (Newfoundland Company) was set up around him for its commercial exploitation. However, In January 1608 Northampton was out of favour with Anne of Denmark and sought a recipe from the Earl of Mar to restore his position.

== The Overbury case ==
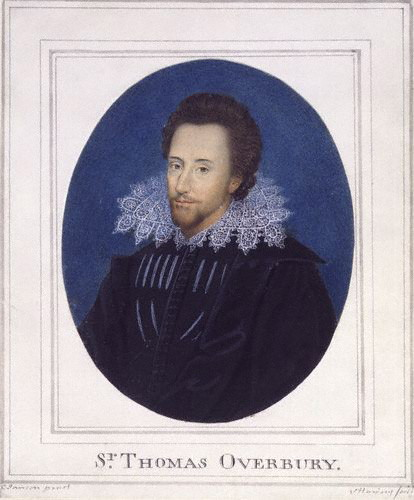
Thomas Overbury

He assisted his great-niece, Lady Essex, in obtaining her divorce from her husband (son of the 2nd Earl of Essex whom Northampton had followed in the 1590s) in order to marry the favourite Somerset, whose mistress she already was. While Northampton may have treated this as routine intrigue, the outcome was a major murder scandal. Both Northampton and her father Thomas Howard, 1st Earl of Suffolk represented her in an interview with Essex held at Whitehall in May 1613, in the hope of obtaining his assent to a divorce. Essex proved uncompliant, and Northampton contrived that the case should be brought before a special commission. When, however, the divorce was obtained, Somerset's intimate acquaintance, Sir Thomas Overbury, dissuaded him from pursuing the project of marriage with Lady Frances. Northampton recommended, on slender grounds, Overbury's imprisonment in the Tower of London, and contrived that a friend of the Howard family, Sir Gervase Helwys, should be appointed Lord Lieutenant of the Tower. Helwys frequently wrote to Northampton about Overbury's conduct and health. In his extant letters to Helwys Northampton writes with contempt of Overbury and expresses a desire that his own name should not be mentioned in connection with his imprisonment, but he introduced to Helwys John Craig, one of the royal physicians, to report on the prisoner's health. Overbury died in September 1613. When the matter was judicially investigated, after Northampton too had died, his political enemies credited him with a direct hand in the murder. Overbury had died from the effects of poison administered by the direction of Lady Essex.

== Last days ==
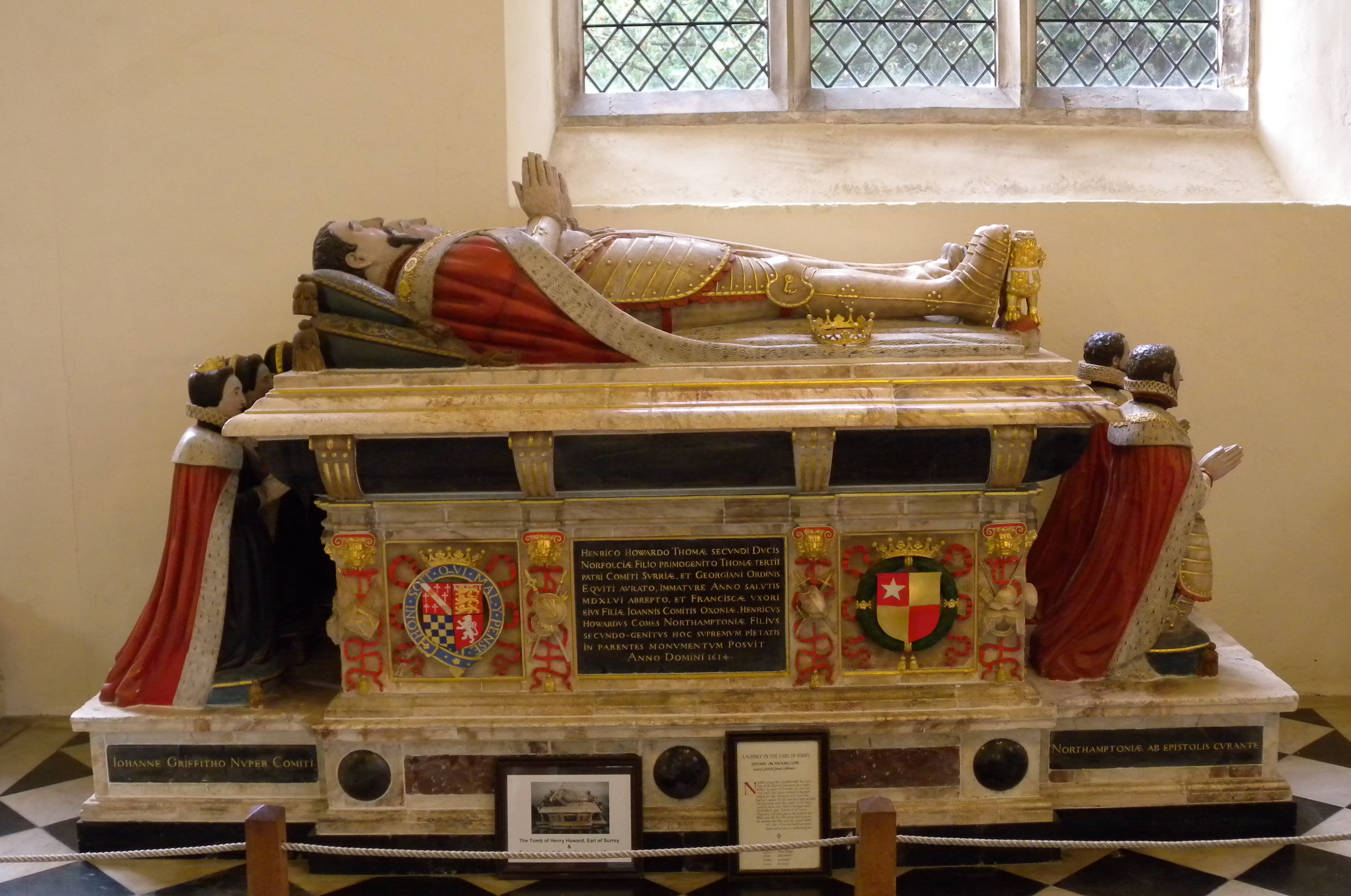
Tomb of Henry Howard, Earl of Surrey and his wife, Frances de Vere, Northampton's parents

Months before his death, Howard ordered his father's remains moved from the Church of All Hallows in Tower Street, where he had been first buried after his execution in 1547, to St Michael the Archangel's Church, Framlingham. Northampton himself commissioned the construction of the spectacular painted alabaster tomb richly decorated with the coats of arms and heraldic animals of the Howard and De Vere families, which was erected at Framlingham to house the remains of his parents. Frances de Vere, Northampton's mother had died in 1577 and was buried in Framlingham, but in 1614 her remains were placed next to those of her first husband in the new tomb.

He advised against the summoning of Parliament in 1614, and then fomented disputes to compel James to dissolve it. He died unmarried on 15 June 1614 and was buried in the chapel of Dover Castle; the monument erected above his grave was subsequently removed to the chapel at Trinity Hospital, Greenwich. His title became extinct at his death. His will, in phrasing that has been considered equivocal, can be reasonably interpreted to imply that he died a Roman Catholic.

== Works ==
He was the author of:

- A Treatise of Natural and Moral Philosophy (1569; manuscript in the Bodleian Library)
- A pamphlet supporting the union between Elizabeth and the duke of Anjou (1580; Harleian MSS. 180)
- A Defensative against the Poyson of supposed Prophecies (1583)
- A reply to a pamphlet denouncing female government (1589; Harleian Manuscript 7021)
- Duello Foiled, printed in Thomas Hearne's Collection of Curious Discourses (1775), ii.225, and ascribed there to Sir Edward Coke
- Translation of Charles V's Last Advice to Philip II, dedicated with a long epistle to the queen (Harl. 836, 1506 and elsewhere in Stowe 95, Kings Manuscripts 106)
- Devotional writings (Arundel Manuscripts 300)
- Speeches at the trials of Guy Fawkes and Garnet in State Trials, vol. I.
- In Somers' Tracts (ed. 1809), ii.136, his opinions on the union between England and Scotland are recorded.

== Building ==
He enlarged Greenwich Castle (on the site of the Royal Observatory, Greenwich), and his London residence, afterwards Northumberland House, was built at his cost from the designs of Moses Glover. He supervised John Thorpe's designs for Audley End, the residence of his nephew Suffolk. He planned and endowed three hospitals: Trinity Hospital at Clun, Shropshire; Trinity Hospital at Castle Rising, Norfolk, for twelve poor women; and a third Trinity Hospital at Greenwich, later called Norfolk College, for twelve poor natives of Greenwich, and for eight natives of Shottesham, Northampton's birthplace. He laid the foundation-stone of the college at Greenwich, 25 February 1614, and placed its management under the Mercers' Company. His connection to the Mercers was principally through Lionel Cranfield.

During the funeral of Anne of Denmark in May 1619, a large stone letter 'S' fell from the battlements of the frontispiece of Northampton House on the procession, killing one William Appleyard. According to Nathaniel Brent, the stone was "thrust down by a gentlewoman who put her foot against it, not thinking it had been so brickle [brittle]".

== Family tree ==
8. Thomas Howard, 2nd Duke of Norfolk
4. Thomas Howard, 3rd Duke of Norfolk
9. Elizabeth Tilney, Countess of Surrey
2. Henry Howard, Earl of Surrey
10. Edward Stafford, 3rd Duke of Buckingham
5. Elizabeth Stafford
11. Eleanor Percy, Duchess of Buckingham
1. Henry Howard, Earl of Northampton
12. John de Vere
6. John de Vere, 15th Earl of Oxford
13. Alice Kirlington
3. Frances de Vere
14. Edward Trussell
7. Elizabeth Trussell
15. Margaret Dun

== Notes ==
Attribution

- This article incorporates text from a publication now in the public domain: "Howard, Henry (1540-1614)". Dictionary of National Biography. London: Smith, Elder & Co. 1885–1900.

Political offices
Preceded by The Lord Cobham	Lord Warden of the Cinque Ports; 1604–1614	Succeeded by The Earl of Somerset
Preceded by The Earl of Salisbury	Lord Privy Seal; 1608–1614	Succeeded by The Earl of Somerset
Vacant Title last held by The Lord Hunsdon	Lord Lieutenant of Norfolk; 1605–1614	Succeeded by The Earl of Arundel
Preceded by The Earl of Salisbury as Lord High Treasurer	First Lord of the Treasury; 1612–1613	Succeeded by The Lord Ellesmere
Regnal titles
Vacant Succession dispute since 1594 Title last held by Ferdinando Stanley	Lord of Mann; 1607–1608	Succeeded by Robert Cecil
