= Gervase Helwys =

English murderer (1561–1615)

Sir Gervase Helwys
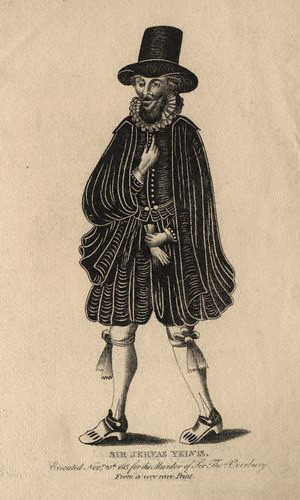
- Born: 1 September 1561; Saundby, Nottinghamshire, England
- Died: 20 November 1615 (aged 54); Tower Hill, London, England
- Cause of death: Hanging
- Resting place: The Tower of London, Westminster
- Other names: Gervase Helwysse; Jervis Yelwys
- Education: Middle Temple
- Alma mater: New Inn
- Occupation: Lieutenant of the Tower of London
- Employer: Henry Howard, 1st Earl of Northampton
- Known for: Complicity in murder of Sir Thomas Overbury
- Title: Sir
- Opponents: Sir Edward Coke; Sir Francis Bacon
- Spouse: Mary Brooke
- Children: William; Thomas; Nathaniel Gervase John; Elizabeth Bridget; Maria; Jane; Anna; Francesca
- Parent(s): John Helwys; Mary Blagden
- Relatives: Thomas Helwys

Sir Gervase Helwys (1 September 1561 – 20 November 1615), also known as Jervis Yelwys, was a Lieutenant of the Tower of London found guilty of complicity in the murder of Sir Thomas Overbury and hanged in 1615. The scandal provoked much public and literary conjecture and irreparably tarnished King James I's court with an image of corruption and depravity. There are variations in the spelling of Helwys: Helwis, Helwiss, Helewyse, Helwysse, Yelwys, Ellowis, Elwys, Elwis, Elvis, Elwes, and Elwaies.

== Background ==
Gervase Helwys was born on 1 September 1561 in Saundby, Nottinghamshire, the first child of parents John Helwys (1535–1600) and Mary Blagden of Thames Ditton. His cousin, Thomas Helwys (1575–1616), the Puritan leader, was thrown into Newgate Prison by the King James I for libel, where he died in 1616, as a Protestant martyr. As a student Helwys studied law at Middle Temple after completing his studies at New Inn, at the University of Oxford. His uncle, Geoffrey Helwys, a successful merchant, Alderman and Sheriff of London, was also a member of the Inn. Soon after, he married Mary Brooke, daughter of Thomas Brooke of Norfolk.

On 7 May 1603, Helwys was knighted by King James I. A decade later, on 6 May 1613, he was appointed by the same king as Lieutenant of the Tower of London after being recommended to the post by Henry Howard, 1st Earl of Northampton. As was common practice at the time, Helwys had to pay for the title, in this instance £2,000; £1,400 going to Northampton and £300 to Sir Thomas Monson, Master of the Armory in the Tower and a friend of Helwys'. Whilst there, Helwys had been involved on 10 March 1614 in the "examination" of prisoner Edmond Peacham, a rector of Hinton St. George who had been charged with having written a libel against the king, at the request of the king's Attorney general, Sir Francis Bacon.

== Overbury Affair ==
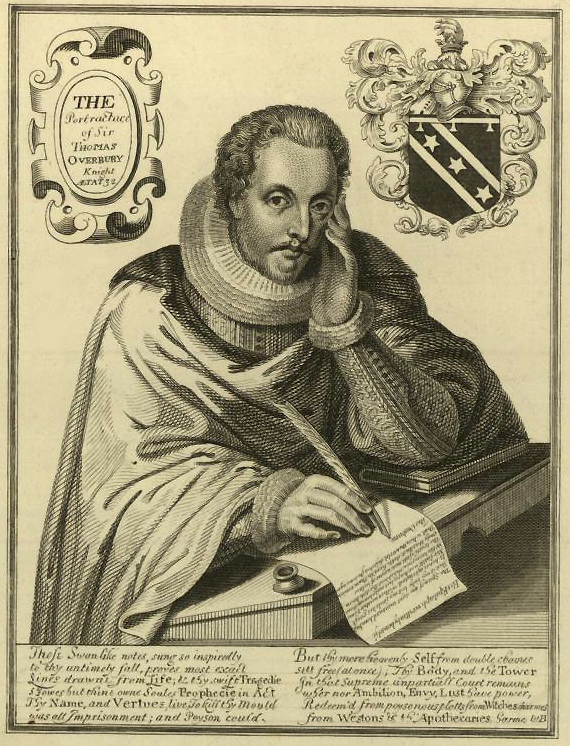
Portrait of Sir Thomas Overbury by Renold Elstracke, c. 1615-1616

When his Secretary of State, Robert Cecil, 1st Earl of Salisbury, died in 1612, King James I had the notion of governing in person as his own chief Minister of State, with his young Scottish favourite, Robert Carr carrying out many of Salisbury's former duties. But James's inability to attend closely to official business exposed the government to factionalism.

The Howard party, consisting of Henry Howard; Thomas Howard, 1st Earl of Suffolk; his son-in-law William Knollys, 1st Earl of Banbury; Charles Howard, 1st Earl of Nottingham, and Sir Thomas Lake, soon took control of much of the government and its patronage. Even the powerful Carr, hardly experienced for the responsibilities thrust upon him and often dependent on his intimate friend Overbury for assistance with government papers, fell into the Howard camp. He had done this after beginning an affair with the married Frances Howard, Countess of Essex, daughter of the Earl of Suffolk, whom James assisted in securing an annulment of her marriage to free her to marry Carr. Seeing as Overbury distrusted the Howards and still had Carr's ear, he tried to prevent the marriage. To remove him from court, the Howard faction manipulated Overbury into seeming to be disrespectful to the Queen, Anne of Denmark. They then were able to convince King James to offer Overbury an assignment as ambassador to the court of Tsar Michael of Russia, with the Howards being fully aware that his refusal would be seen as tantamount to treason. The plan worked and Overbury declined, sensing the urgency to remain in England and at his friend's side. On 22 April 1613, Overbury was placed in the Tower at the king's "request", eventually dying there five months later on 15 September "of natural causes."

In July 1615, after rumours began circulating at court, it subsequently emerged that Overbury had in fact been poisoned the discovery of the crime being revealed by a boy in the employment of one of the apothecaries responsible.

Investigations were made and proofs were abundantly forthcoming. At a dinner in Whitehall with the king's new Secretary of State, Sir Ralph Winwood, Helwys admitted that he suspected there might have been some foul play. He immediately became suspect after correspondence surfaced between himself and Northampton concerning Overbury's conduct and health. In his letters to Helwys Northampton wrote with contempt of Overbury and expressed a desire that his own name should not be mentioned in connection with his imprisonment. Northampton also introduced one of the royal physicians, John Craig, to Helwys to report on the prisoner's health. Helwys made the mistake of corresponding with Howard, the chief suspect in Overbury's poisoning. When the matter was judicially investigated, Helwys felt his political enemies were trying to credit him with a direct hand in the murder. On 1 October 1615, he was arrested and forced to exchange his lodgings for a cell in the Tower.

== Trial and execution ==
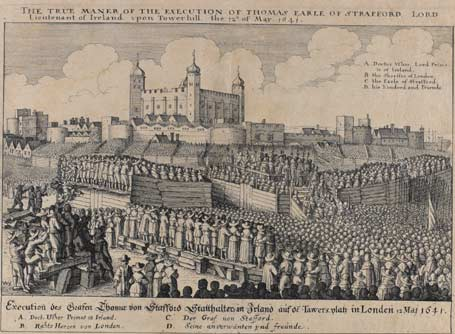
Engraving depicting an execution at Tower Hill c. 1641

In 1615, Helwys was put on trial, along with Monson, Richard Weston (the gaoler and ex-servant of Howard and Carr's), Mrs Anne Turner (widow of a fashionable London doctor), and a disreputable apothecary named James Franklin, in Guildhall, London for complicity in the murder of Overbury. The hearings were presided over by Sir Edward Coke, Lord Chief Justice of the King's Bench, and Sir Francis Bacon. It was ruled that "poisons" had been "administered" in the form of "jellies" and "tarts" by Weston, Turner and Franklin at the direction of Frances Howard.

When Howard and Carr were tried she admitted a part in the murder, but her husband did not. Fearing what Carr might say about him in court, James repeatedly sent messages to the Tower pleading with him to admit his guilt in return for a pardon. "It is easy to be seen that he would threaten me with laying an aspersion upon me of being, in some sort, accessory to his crime." Carr refused and the couple were found guilty and sentenced to death. The king commuted their sentence to life imprisonment and they were eventually pardoned along with Monson.

The only evidence against Helwys was that of Franklin, who asserted that the Lieutenant had been in league with Frances Howard. Through letters to Howard that were not read at the hearings, it was clear that Helwys initially had no idea that Overbury was being poisoned. He confessed later that he had entertained suspicions of this after discovering earlier attempts to poison Overbury on the part of the gaoler Weston, who had been placed in that position at the suggestion of Northampton. Considering the powerful people protecting Weston, and assuming him, indeed, to be no less than their agent, Helwys had hesitated to interfere in what seemed to him to be a matter of state. He had, however, done his utmost surreptitiously to save Overbury. It was plain both from Weston's statements and from Helwys' own, that the Lieutenant had done his very best to defeat the Turner-Essex-Northampton plot to poison his prisoner, throwing away the "rosalgar" and later "draughts", as well as substituting food for Overbury from his own kitchen for that "sent in" by Turner. He had made Weston recognise the "hideousness" of what he had done and made him promise to desist from further attempts upon the prisoner's life. Although Helwys maintained that he kept a close watch on Overbury after this event, he nevertheless suspected that the "thing was done" the moment his vigilance had been relaxed.

On 18 November, – Helwys, Weston, Turner and Franklin – were found guilty as "accessories before the fact done" and, lacking powerful connections, were sentenced to death. On the day of his execution on the following Monday, 20 November at Tower Hill, Helwys gave an impassioned speech to the crowd in attendance protesting his innocence:

I was so far from thinking myself foul in the fact, that until these two Gentlemen, (Doctor Felton and Doctor Whiting, the physicians for my soul) told me how deeply I had imbrued my hands in the blood of (Overbury) making me, by God’s law, as guilty in the concealing (of it) as if I had been a personal actor in it. Till then... I held myself ignorant of the deed, and my conscience so clear, that I did never ask God forgiveness...

He did, however, beg God's forgiveness for both his guilt in the crime and for being “much addicted" to gambling. Helwys left behind him eight children with his wife Mary: William, Thomas, Nathaniel Gervase John, Elizabeth Bridget, Maria, Jane, Anna and Francesca.
