= Thomas Overbury =

English poet and essayist (1581–1613)

Sir Thomas Overbury
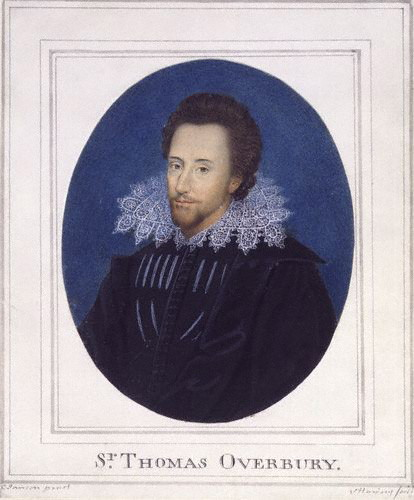
- Born: Thomas Overbury; 1581; Compton Scorpion, Warwickshire, England
- Died: 14 September 1613 (aged 31–32); Tower of London, London
- Cause of death: Poison
- Resting place: Tower of London
- Education: Middle Temple
- Alma mater: Queen's College, Oxford
- Occupations: Poet, courtier
- Employer: Robert Carr
- Known for: Poetry, his murder
- Opponents: Frances Howard; Henry Howard; Thomas Howard; Charles Howard; Lord Knollys; Anne of Denmark; Sir Thomas Lake
- Parent(s): Nicholas Overbury; Mary Palmer
- Relatives: Sir Giles Overbury (brother)

Sir Thomas Overbury (baptized 1581 – 14 September 1613) was an English poet and essayist, also known for being the victim of a murder which led to a scandalous trial. His poem A Wife (also referred to as The Wife), which depicted the virtues that a young man should demand of a woman, played a significant role in the events that precipitated his murder.

== Background ==
Thomas Overbury was born near Ilmington in Warwickshire, a son of the marriage of Nicholas Overbury, of Bourton-on-the-Hill, Gloucester, and Mary Palmer. In the autumn of 1595, he became a gentleman commoner of Queen's College, Oxford. He took his degree of BA in 1598, by which time he had already been admitted to study law in the Middle Temple in London. He soon found favour with Sir Robert Cecil, travelled on the Continent, and began to enjoy a reputation for an accomplished mind and free manners.

== Robert Carr ==
About 1601, while visiting Edinburgh, he met Robert Carr, then an obscure page to the Earl of Dunbar. A great friendship was struck up between the two youths, and they came down to London together. Carr's early history is obscure, and it is probable that Overbury secured an introduction to court before his young associate contrived to do so. At all events, when Carr attracted the attention of James I in 1606 by breaking his leg in the tilt-yard, Overbury had for some time been servitor-in-ordinary or "sewer" to King James. A "sewer" was a servant attending the monarch at meal times.

Knighted by James in June 1608, from October 1608 to August 1609, he travelled in the Netherlands and France, staying in Antwerp and Paris; he spent at least some of this time with his contemporary, the Puritan theologian Francis Rous.

Upon his return he began following Carr's fortunes very closely. When the latter was made Viscount Rochester in 1610, the intimacy seems to have been sustained. With Overbury's aid, the young Carr caught the eye of the King, and soon became his favourite and his lover. Overbury had the wisdom and Carr had the king's ear into which to pour it. The combination took Carr swiftly up the ladder of power. Soon he was the most powerful man in England next to Robert Cecil. However, Overbury and Rochester somehow offended Anne of Denmark in May 1611, and when she heard them laughing together in the garden at Greenwich Palace, she complained to the King that they laughed at her. Overbury was excluded from court for a few months.

== Court intrigues and death ==
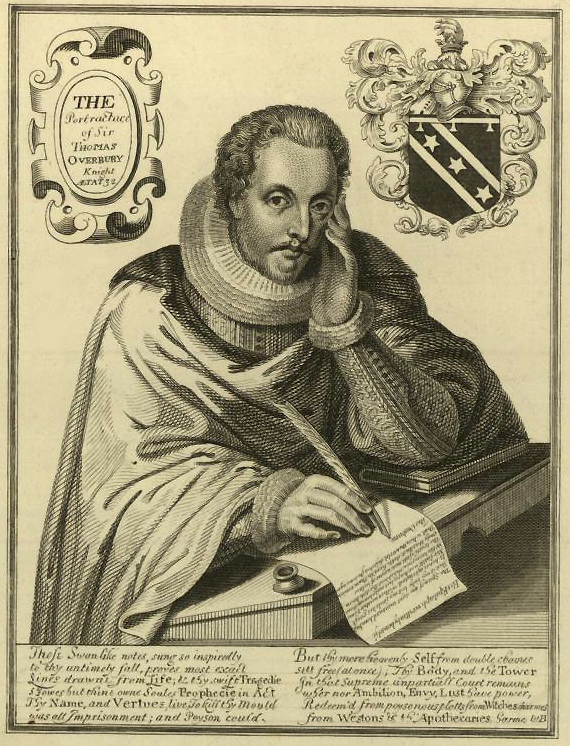
Engraving of a younger Overbury. Made after his death by Renold Elstracke, c. 1615–1616

After the death of Cecil in 1612, the Howard party, consisting of Henry Howard, Thomas Howard, his son-in-law Lord Knollys, and Charles Howard, along with Sir Thomas Lake, moved to take control of much of the government and its patronage. The powerful Carr, unfit for the responsibilities thrust upon him and often dependent on his intimate friend, Overbury, for assistance with government papers, fell into the Howard camp, after beginning an affair with the married Frances Howard, Countess of Essex, daughter of the Earl of Suffolk.

Overbury was from the first violently opposed to the affair, pointing out to Carr that it would be hurtful to his preferment, and that Frances Howard, even at this early stage in her career, was already "noted for her injury and immodesty." However, Carr was now infatuated, and he repeated to the Countess what Overbury had said. It was at this time, too, that Overbury wrote, and circulated widely in manuscript his poem A Wife, which was a picture of the virtues which a young man should demand in a woman before he has the rashness to marry her. Lady Essex believed that Overbury's object in writing this poem was to open the eyes of his friend to her defects. The situation now turned into a deadly duel between the mistress and the friend. The Countess tried to manipulate Overbury into seeming to be disrespectful to the queen, Anne of Denmark who took offence. Her chamberlain, Viscount Lisle, wrote in November 1612 that Overbury was allowed to come to court, but not in the queen's sight, or into her side of the royal lodgings.

James I offered Overbury an assignment as ambassador, probably to the court of Michael of Russia, relations with Russia being at that time a potential issue between those who favoured a strongly pro-Protestant and anti-Catholic foreign policy, and those, centred on the Howards, who favoured accommodation with Catholic powers on the Continent; there were political reasons of international policy as well as personal ones involving the King's jealousy of Overbury's relationship with Carr, to persuade James to send the former away and also a private interest for Carr and the Earl of Northampton to urge the offer upon him. Overbury declined, possibly because he felt tricked into it by Carr (precisely because refusing would ensure that Overbury would be imprisoned), possibly because Overbury sensed the urgency to remain in England and at his friend's side. James I was so irate at Overbury's arrogance in declining the offer that he had him thrown into the Tower of London on 22 April 1613, where he died on 14 September.

== Beginnings of scandal ==
The Howards won James's support for an annulment of Frances's marriage to Robert Devereux, 3rd Earl of Essex, on grounds of impotence, to free her to remarry. With James's assistance, the marriage was duly annulled on 25 September 1613, despite Devereux's opposition to the charge of impotence. The commissioners judging the case reached a 5–5 verdict, so James quickly appointed two extra judges guaranteed to vote in favour, an intervention which aroused public censure. When, after the annulment, Thomas Bilson (son of Thomas Bilson, Bishop of Winchester, one of the added commissioners) was knighted, he was given the nickname "Sir Nullity Bilson". There were also rumours that the commission was tricked into believing that Frances was still virgo intacta.

The marriage two months later of Frances Howard and Robert Carr, now the Earl of Somerset, was the court event of the season, celebrated in verse by John Donne. The Howards' rise to power seemed complete.

Rumours of foul play in Overbury's death began circulating. Almost two years later, in September 1615, and as James was in the process of replacing Carr with new favourite George Villiers, the governor of the Tower sent a letter to the King, informing him that one of the warders had been bringing the prisoner "poisoned food and medicine."

James showed a disinclination to delve into the matter, but the rumours refused to go away. Eventually, they began hinting at the King's own involvement, forcing him to order an investigation. The details of the murder were uncovered by Edward Coke and Sir Francis Bacon who presided over the trial.

== Trial ==
Engraving of Overbury in later years

In the celebrated trials of the six accused in late 1615 and early 1616 that followed, evidence of a plot came to light. It was very likely that Overbury was the victim of a 'set-up' contrived by the Earls of Northampton and Suffolk, with Carr's complicity, to keep him out of the way during the annulment proceedings. Overbury knew too much of Carr's dealings with Frances and, motivated by a deep political hostility to the Howards, opposed the match with a fervour that made him dangerous. The Queen had sown discord between the friends, calling Overbury Carr's "governor".

It was not known at the time, and it is not certain now, how much Carr participated in the first crime, or if he was ignorant of it. Lady Essex, however, was not satisfied with having had Overbury imprisoned; she was determined that "he should return no more to this stage." She had Sir William Wade, the Lord Lieutenant of the Tower, removed to make way for a new Lieutenant, Sir Gervase Helwys; and a gaoler, Richard Weston, of whom it was ominously said that he was "a man well acquainted with the power of drugs", was set to attend on Overbury. Weston, afterwards aided by Mrs Anne Turner, the widow of a physician, and by an apothecary called Franklin, plied Overbury with sulfuric acid in the form of copper vitriol.

It cannot have been difficult for the conspirators to secure James's compliance because he disliked Overbury's influence over Carr. John Chamberlain (1553–1628) reported at the time that the King "hath long had a desire to remove him from about the lord of Rochester [Carr], as thinking it a dishonour to him that the world should have an opinion that Rochester ruled him and Overbury ruled Rochester". Overbury had been poisoned.

Frances Howard admitted a part in Overbury's murder, but her husband did not. Fearing what Carr might say about him in court, James repeatedly sent messages to the Tower pleading with him to admit his guilt in return for a pardon. "It is easy to be seen that he would threaten me with laying an aspersion upon me of being, in some sort, accessory to his crime".

In late May 1616, the couple were found guilty and sentenced to death for their parts in this conspiracy. Nevertheless, they remained prisoners in the Tower until eventually released in 1622 and pardoned.

Four accomplices – Richard Weston, Anne Turner, Gervaise Helwys and Simon Franklin – were found guilty prior to that in 1615 and, lacking powerful connections, were hanged.

The implication of the King in such a scandal provoked much public and literary conjecture and irreparably tarnished James's court with an image of corruption and depravity.

== Aftermath ==
The dramatist John Ford wrote a lost work titled Sir Thomas Overbury's Ghost, containing the history of his life and untimely death (1615). Its nature is uncertain, but Ford scholars have suggested it may have been an elegy, prose piece or pamphlet.

== See also ==
- The Cobbe portrait, frequently cited as one of a very few portraits of William Shakespeare, is believed by several scholars to be a portrait of Overbury instead.
