= Hilderston (silver mine) =

Coordinates: 55.9259°N 3.6166°W

Hilderston or Hilderstone in West Lothian, Scotland, was the site of the discovery of a vein of silver in 1606 and a mining operation that attracted international interest. King James used rumours of a silver bonanza to leverage a loan in the City of London. He took over the mine works, an act sometimes regarded as an example of nationalization. The enterprise may have inspired a satirical stage play. On 8 May 1608 work commenced under royal supervision. Miners from Cornwall and Germany were employed in the works.

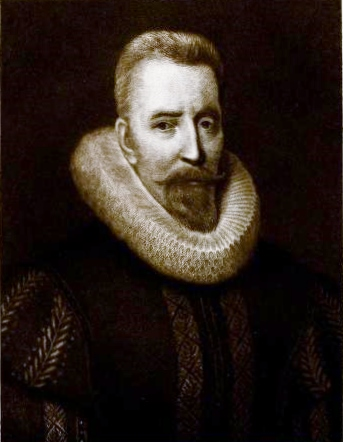
Sir Thomas Hamilton was the proprietor of the Hilderston silver mine until James VI and I decided to install his own management team

Hilderston is near Cairnpapple Hill in the Bathgate Hills. Contemporary descriptions of the silver ore seem to refer to native silver, mercury amalgams, arsenical content, and nickeline, found in "native silver bearing carbonate veins".

== The God's Blessing shaft ==
Silver was discovered on lands at Hilderston in June 1606. The find was attributed to a collier called Sandy Maund by another prospector Stephen Atkinson. The landowner was the King's Advocate, Sir Thomas Hamilton, who managed the initial mining works for a while. He had acquired the estates of West Binny and Orchardfield east of Hilderston in 1601 and these lands, including a former property of Robert Hamilton of Briggis, were made into a free Barony of Binny. The mine site was sometimes called "Binnie".

Hamilton obtained a specific "tack" to work mine and minerals in Linlithgowshire on 26 June 1606 (presumably after the silver discovery), and subsequently gained permission to "draw levels, waterways, sinks, conducts, shafts" and build "fire-works (furnaces), water works, dwelling houses" and cut peats and timber, to extract his Majesty's metals. Hamilton employed the English mining entrepreneur Bevis Bulmer partnered with his brother-in-law, the Scottish goldsmith and financier Thomas Foulis. Hamilton sent "little parcels" of native silver and ore and topographic details to King James in London, and the King asked Robert Cecil, Earl of Salisbury to conduct chemical assays of the ore in April 1607.

Hamilton was appointed Master of Mines and Metals in Scotland on 25 March 1607, and put in charge of crown revenue from gold and other mines. He was able to use the Privy Council to browbeat other Linlithgowshire landowners, like James Ross of Wardlaw, who held Tartraven, just east of Hilderston and had refused to allow the miners on his land.

Bulmer christened the shaft at Hilderston "God's Blessing". Some miners from the Earl of Pembroke's works in Cornwall were sent to Bulmer in April 1607. One of the accounts identifies Cornish workmen as "Inglish pickmen".

The partnership of Hamilton and Bulmer broke up. Bulmer wrote to Hamilton on 10 August 1607 that he was unable to pay the workmen at Hilderston, and Hamilton should take over the mine. He left the site to Hamilton's own management. By this witnessed "bond and deposition" Bulmer quit the works.

On 17 and 18 August, equipment and mine buildings erected by Bevis Bulmer at the gold mines at Bailgilhead and Lang Cleuch near Wanlockhead were destroyed by saboteurs, possibly a hostile act against Thomas Hamilton, as Master of Mines and Metals. In September 1607 a general order from the Privy Council prevented mine workers absconding. A "miner, pick-man, windaisman (winch-handler), fire-man (furnace workers) or any workman" departing without written licence was liable to arrest. Secondly, "masterless vagabonds and sturdy beggars" could be taken and put to work.

== King James takes an interest ==
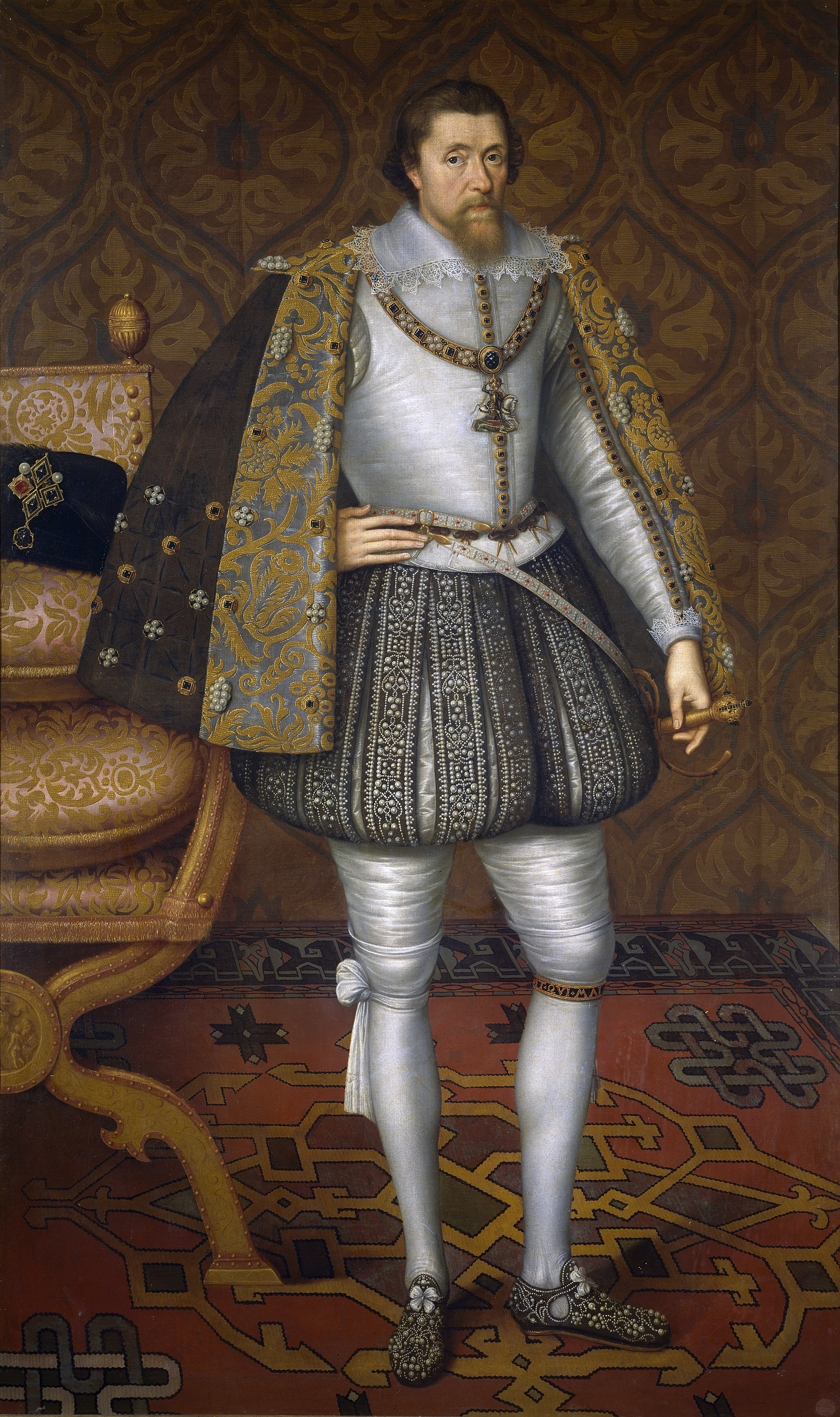
King James thought Hilderston was a good bet and pushed aside his lawyer, hoping to fill his empty coffers

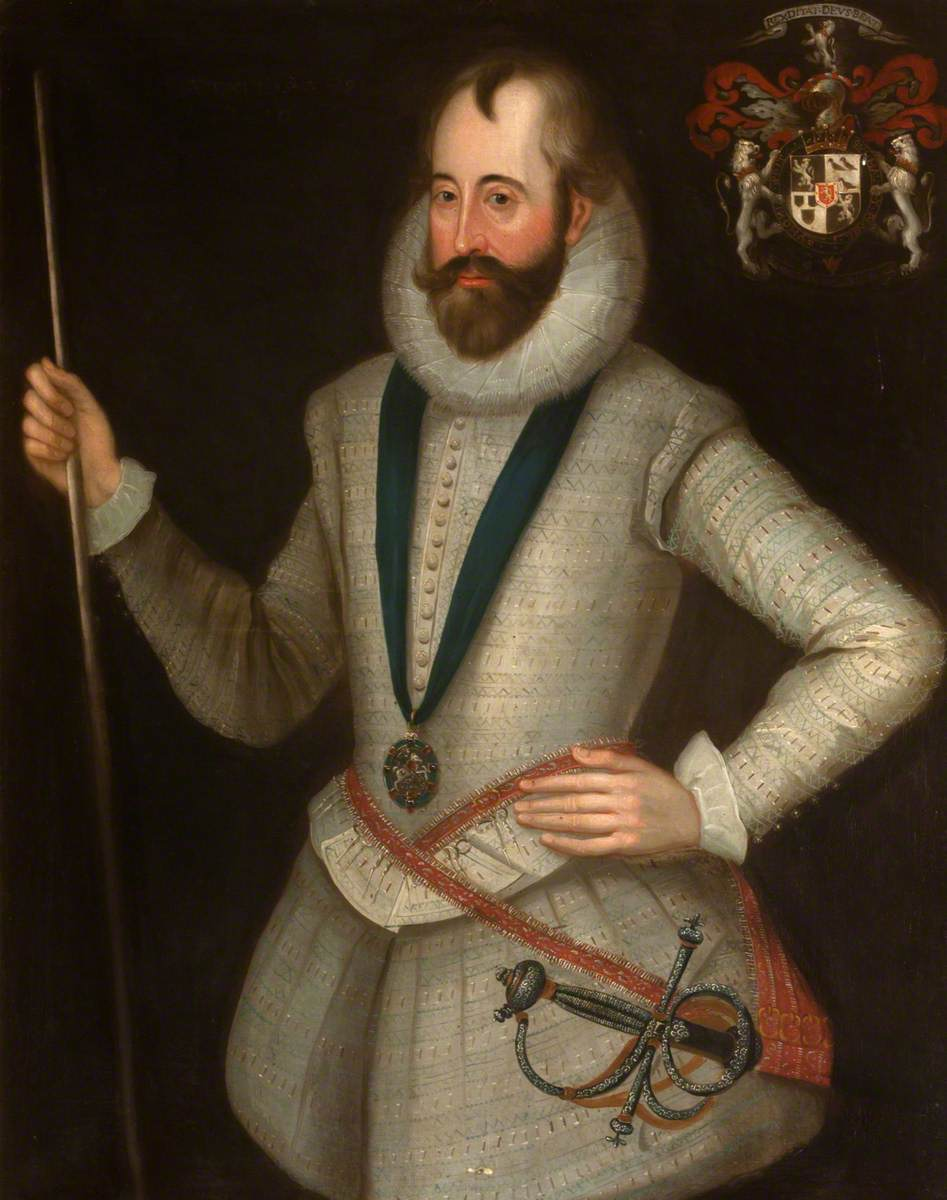
Zorzi Giustinian thought the Earl of Dunbar (pictured) was managing the royal takeover

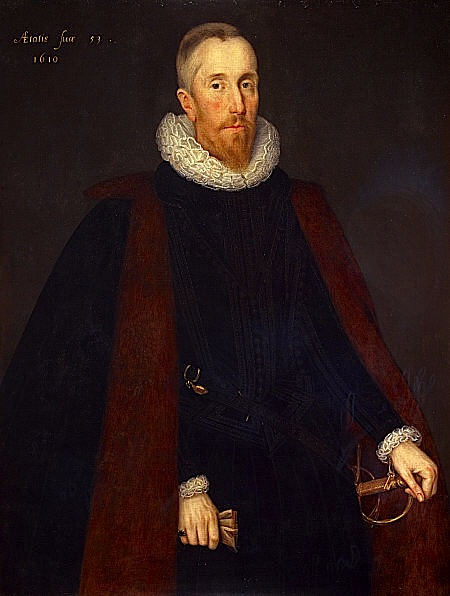
The Earl of Dunfermline was baffled by the science

Thomas Hamilton had fielded some inquiries from King James about the mine in 1607 while Bulmer was still working for him. The current arrangement was that the King received a tenth of the profit. Hamilton wrote in detail to King James about Bulmer and mining in Scotland on 12 September 1607. He had not recently sent any reports of Bulmer's other projects in Scotland. He felt that he had been "credulously induced" to place his own mine in Bulmer's management. Bulmer had been advertising in London the "exorbitant value" of the silver to be extracted. Bulmer did not have sufficient capital of his own to work the mine at Hilderston for Hamilton and had made his "voluntary renunciation". Hamilton paid the miners' back wages.

Hamilton stated that he was continuing the work at Hilderston to the king's benefit (the king received 10% and other benefits), although several miners had left due to an outbreak of plague. Bulmer had accused Hamilton of concealing the true value of his mine from the King, but Hamilton pointed out that the large industrial operation could hardly have been a secret. Bulmer had been in charge at Hilderston for four months (April to August 1607), and could have kept Hamilton himself better informed. Hamilton had several times asked him to maximise the king's profit. Hamilton had also hoped that Bulmer would train up local people, also to the king's benefit.

On 25 November, King James gave a commission to an official from the Royal Mint, Edmund Doubleday (a tall Middle Temple lawyer said to have arrested Guy Fawkes), and Bevis Bulmer to survey the site and examine the stockpiled ore in the winter of 1607/8, and take a quantity for assay. The Privy Council of Scotland had reservations about this apparent appropriation of private property, but John Arnot of Birswick produced Hamilton's letter agreeing to satisfy the royal commission in all points. In early January the Privy Council of Scotland planned to assay the ore for themselves using the most "experimented men" in Scotland. The Chancellor of Scotland, the Earl of Dunfermline felt all the metallurgy was beyond his expertise, and "professed plain ignorance of all experience in these subterraneall works". Later in January, Thomas Hamilton wrote to the King of the continuing hopes for the "largeness and richness of the vein". Hamilton thought the ore ought to be processed in Scotland, rather than shipped elsewhere for refining.

== Under new management ==
Rowland Whyte wrote about the assay of ore in London from the "great mine in Scotland" on 26 January 1608. Reports of the yield had resulted in "much hope and joy". Whyte said more royal commissioners were to set out for Scotland, and if all reports "prove true, his Majesty's empty coffers will be filled, and his great debts paid". The King's Council were asking London merchants for loans. On 29 January, in Edinburgh, Thomas Hamilton learnt that he was displaced. John Arnot of Birswick, depute-treasurer, took possession of the mine on behalf of the King. He closed the shafts but continued draining the works.

Hamilton wrote to the King again gracefully accepting his decision on 19 February. He apologised for any show of resistance to John Arnot at the end of January, which may have offended King James, "I should sooner have offered to have been buried in the bottom of the work, nor to have [rather than have] meaned to any possession to your majesties miscontentment". He also denounced the underhand activities and "great malice" of Bevis Bulmer, who had tried to get neighbouring landholders to dispute Hamilton's title to the mine and had asked fellow commissioners and courtiers in London, "sum nobilmen at court", to write to the king to ensure that Hamilton was prohibited from continuing.

Bevis Bulmer re-opened the mine. Samples of ore were sent to London for refining and assay. On 18 February, impatient to receive the next shipment of Scottish ore, the Earl of Salisbury wrote to the courtier Roger Aston, (a courtier who had managed a coal mine at Linlithgow), his expectation that in a few months he could say "Scotland has yielded us the richest mine that ever was discovered in Europe".

== On the London stage ==
The French ambassador in London, Antoine Lefèvre de la Boderie, wrote of the increasing interest in the mine and the arrival of ore in London, on 27 February 1608. Boderie linked the profits with King James's continued interest in forming a full political union between England and Scotland with one Parliament. The silver would cement the two kingdoms.

In London, in March or Lenten term 1608, a play opened apparently on the theme of the Scottish silver bonanza, performed by the Children of the Queen's Revels at the Blackfriars Theatre, and was promptly closed after offending King James. The text has not survived. On 8 April, the French ambassador, Antoine Lefèvre de la Boderie, mentioned it slandered James, his Scottish mine, and his favourites.

Boderie had already reported in detail the assay of ore from the "mine d'Ecosse", with the jaundiced observation that unprofitable silver mines were at least a public benefit by the creation of employment. A letter from Thomas Lake to the Earl of Salisbury of 11 March mentions that players had offended in the "matter of the mines". Subsequently, on account of this banned play and the Byron plays, Henry Evans gave up managing the company and the theatre.

The performance of the play (whether it referenced Hilderston directly or not) was after King James had begun the process to take the mine into his hands. Hamilton learnt of the King's direction that John Arnot, the depute-treasurer was now in charge by 29 January 1608 and described in his letter to James of 19 February 1608 the steps Arnot had taken on site. Hamilton's letters also reveal that Bevis Bulmer had widely publicised the new profitable silver mine to London courtiers in order to eject Hamilton. Bulmer had access to court circles, his son-in-law, Patrick Murray, was a gentleman of the king's privy chamber (though still in education).

The near-contemporary historian David Calderwood described the gestation of the mine's initially modest reputation over nine months, until the King was moved to send for Hamilton. In fact, James commanded Hamilton to come to London, bringing his charters for the mine, on 11 February, ten weeks after sending his commissioners north in November. On 14 March Hamilton made a statement to the Privy Council of England on the yield of the mine to date, three days after Lake's letter mentioned theatre censorship and the "matter of the mines".

The Venetian ambassador Zorzi Giustinian had heard before Christmas 1607 that James had asked his council to find the legal means to work the mine, at the instance of the Earl of Dunbar. Giustinian knew the mine had been discovered some years before. Giustinian and Boderie (in February) had realised that rumours of new-found wealth would help James raise a loan in the city.

How the play may have mentioned mining, if the "matter of mines" referred to Scottish business, and the nature of the allusion to the king are unknown. Some scholars suggest that Boderie's mention of a Scottish mine in the banned play, the King's mine d'Escosse, was likely an insulting reference to his Scottish face or "mien", or to James' demeanour and homosocial personal relations. A joke about "mines" and facial expressions had been current at the French court in 1602 after reports of discoveries of gold and silver, made by a wit or buffoon called La Regnardière or Renardière.

The Blackfriars theatre company was associated with household of Anne of Denmark. Her ladies in waiting and chamberers were keenly interested in the industrial developments of mining and glass-making; Dorothy Silking tried to open a coal mine at Corston in 1609, and Elizabeth Roper became involved in the manufacture of glass. Lady Jane Drummond wrote to Thomas Hamilton in May 1608, mentioning that she had told the queen that King James had compensated him for the mine and congratulating him on this windfall payment, and on the birth of a daughter, who he had christened Anna. Jane Drummond wrote; "I acquentit hir Maiesti with your gud luk; for the king no shuner gaive you mony for your mynd, bot God send you a chyld to bestow it on".

== Extraction in 1608 ==
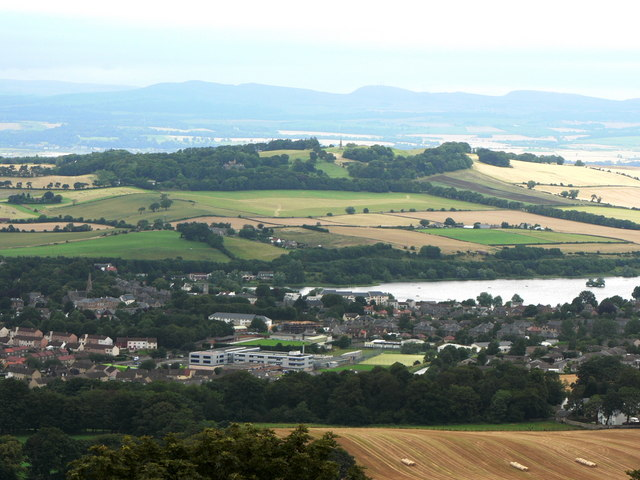
The refinery was sited at the west end of Linlithgow loch, on the silver road north from Bathgate to Bo'ness

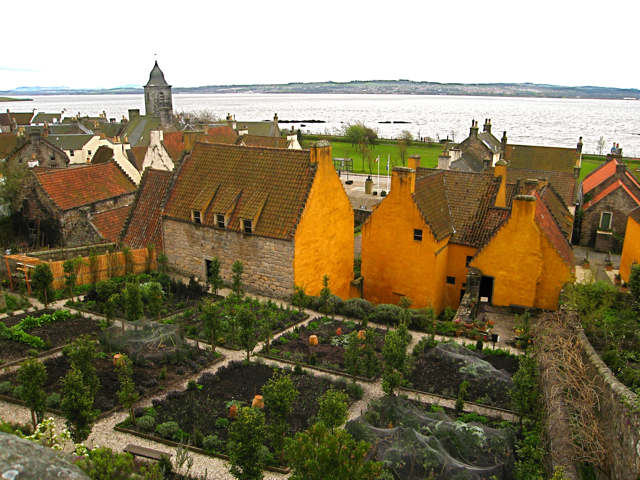
George Bruce of Carnock, an entrepreneur noted for his innovations in coal mining and shipping, who lived across the Forth at Culross, was manager of the royal works

Bevis Bulmer and his fellow commissioners delivered 38 barrels of ore to the Scottish Privy Council. A cargo of ore was shipped to London in February 1608 for assay. Robert Cecil presumed the assay of sample ore examined would "little vary" in the expected yield of many thousands of tons of ore. Zorzi Giustinian wrote of vain hopes of riches and exaggerated rumour. This talk would benefit King James as he was raising a loan. Zorzi Giustinian reported the results of an assay at the Tower in April.

Amongst those involved or interested in the assay of the Scottish ore in London, Thomas Russell secured a patent to make brimstone and copperas (in England) with the help of the Scottish courtier David Murray, a member of the house of Prince Henry. Murray subsequently invested in the copperas project.

The Scottish Privy Council cancelled its act to return the keys of the mine buildings to Thomas Hamilton after the commission ran its course. Arnot formally declared that Hamilton had not made him possessor of the works, which required the deletion of another act of council, clearing the way for Bevis Bulmer to take charge of the project, and on 25 April he was appointed as "governor of the works of his majesty's mines under ground", or "first master and prefect supervisor of our mineral works" at Hilderston. George Bruce of Carnock was treasurer of the works and Archibald Primrose was clerk. The accounts for running the mine, under the auspices of the Earl of Dunbar as Treasurer of Scotland, begin on 8 May 1608. On that day Bulmer "received full possession" from Hamilton, his workmen took over the drainage pumps, and on Wednesday his miners began work. Some extracts and quotations from the manuscript account books, which continue to 10 December 1610, were published in Gold Mynes in Scotland (1825) and by Robert William Cochran-Patrick in 1878.

=== Accommodation and buildings for processing ore ===
In May 1608 work commenced building the refining and stamping mills at Linlithgow Loch, close to the royal Linlithgow Palace, north of Hilderston and on the route to the port at Bo'ness. The smelting house chimney at Linlithgow was made of wood. A furnace for making assays on site had clay mufflers. Beds and a "langsaddle" bench were sent to furnish the headquarters at Hilderston from George Bruce's house, Culross Palace. Bulmer's chamber had two glass windows and was located in a wing of the building called an "outshot". The accounts mention the building of a refining mill for silver at Leith, but this project seems to have been abandoned in favour of the site by Linlithgow Loch.

English pick-men miners arrived from Cornwall and were lodged in the loft of the old melting house. Their names were recorded in the mining accounts, preserved at the National Records of Scotland. William Coistene of King's Lynn was the lead carpenter. Timber and other materials for the mine buildings were shipped from Leith to Bo'ness. Some timber was cut at nearby Carriber, the estate of the Gib family. The buildings were thatched with straw fixed with cords. The same straw was used for the mattresses for the English miners or melting house workmen. Dutch or German miners Martin Smedell and Hans Myar started two new shafts. One of the German miners Emanuel Hochstetter came from the mines at Keswick in Cumbria.

=== Discipline and welfare ===
In September 1608 a proclamation was issued that none should assist the skilled mine workers to leave Scotland. Three men were paid to pursue an English smith, John Spargus, who left the works without permission in September 1609. Miners who were injured or ill had sick pay at half the daily rate, including Henry Rice who was given £6 to return to Cornwall. One English worker, Emmanuel Turner, died at Hilderston after a week or more of illness. Mine administrators had a stock of paper to issue passports for returning miners who were sick and "discharged". Three miners, John Roberts, Thomas Roberts, and Thomas Jackharris, were jailed at Linlithgow in February 1610 for disobedience. Thomas Jackharris was a skilled worker who accompanied Bevis Bulmer during three days of surveying work.

=== Inspections and assays ===
The London goldsmith and Master of the Mint Richard Martin volunteered to assay the Hilderston ore in June 1608. Sir William Bowyer visited in July and thought the vein was as impressive as anything he had seen in Germany. He would ship samples to England as ballast at a low cost. Bowyer was at the mine when the Earl of Dunbar visited on 1 August. He found a "clew" or hank of thread "of silver wire as though it had been drawn by a goldsmith".

A Scottish chronicle mentions ore sent from the silver mine at "Binnie" to the Tower of London by the Earl of Dunbar at this time. The Earl of Salisbury was confident about the rich vein, and even supposed in a letter to Richard Spencer and Ralph Winwood that another mine might be found.

William Bowyer rode to "Grinston", Cranston near Pathhead, to speak to the Earl of Dunbar about the mines. William Godolphin came later in August and met up with Bowyer, and was also impressed. The German expert Martin Smeddell came to meet Godolphin, summoned from working at nearby "Killeith" or Kinleith burn, a stream that joins the Water of Leith at Currie. Efforts were also made to open mines at Calder Moor and at the Water of "Even" or Avon.

Hilderston ore was assayed at the Tower of London by Thomas Russell and Andrew Palmer in August and September. The English ambassador in Venice Henry Wotton read the Earl of Salisbury's report of the mine and assay to the Doge at the end of August, emphasising the "undoubted truth" that the vein of silver was rich and the hopes that it was as rich and dependable as those of the Indies. 98 barrels of ore had been shipped to London. In September, Palmer sent the results of a "private assay" to the Earl of Salisbury. Palmer advised Salisbury to withhold information about the assay and prevent Thomas Knyvet at the Tower Mint releasing Scottish ore to refiners before further tests were completed.

On 7 October 1608 eight German miners were sent to Scotland from the Duke of Saxony, a brother-in-law of Anne of Denmark. The team leader or overseer of the Saxony miners was Henry Starky or Starchy. The French ambassador, Boderie, sent an agent, Robert le Maçon, Sieur de la Fontaine, who had known George Bruce of Carnock for 20 years, to inspect the mines and countryside in October 1608. Richard Martin reported an adverse assay and technical difficulties in October. After doubtful smelting experiments in an ironmaster's furnace at Maresfield in Sussex, in December, it was apparent that the Hilderston ore was of varying quality.

== Final years ==
Work at the mine continued. In May 1611 King James assigned some of his income from "our silver mine beside Linlithgow" to the Earl of Tullibardine in recompense for money owed to his father William Murray of Tullibardine, who had been Comptroller of Scotland. The royal letter explained that the rights and duties of the mine had been acquired from the royal advocate Thomas Hamilton because "it was no way competent or proper in the person of a subject to possess" such a property.

In 1613 Thomas Foulis obtained the contract for the mine with William Alexander of Menstrie and Paulo Pinto from Portugal. The treasurer-depute Gideon Murray reported on these works to King James in June 1614, writing that the mines had yielded silver, although not at profit, and James should choose payment of his tenth from William Alexander either in "metal" or refined siver. He advised taking the silver already refined in Scotland was the best option.

The mine seems to have closed soon after. In the 1640s James Hope of Hopetoun negotiated with the Sandilands family for rights to the workings. Hope was haunted by an image in a dream of the potential riches as a tree of pure silver. In 1870 the mine was re-opened for investigation, no significant silver was found, and discarded nickeline or niccolite and baryta from the older workings was shipped to Germany to be processed for nickel and barium.

== Stephen Atkinson's account of Hilderston ==
Stephen Atkinson wrote a historical overview of gold and silver mining in Scotland in 1619 as a prospectus for further investment. Some of his material is doubtful or obscure. He claims to have used Bevis Bulmer's papers and accounts. His history was published in 1825.

Atkinson says that he worked for a while at Hilderston. He heard that the collier Sandy Maund had found a piece of heavy "red-mettle" veined with threads or hairs and a curious brown spar-stone near the Hilderston burn. He showed the rocks to a more knowledgeable friend, Robert Stewart (bailie of Linlithgow) saying, according to Atkinson, that he had found them in the "Silver burn" by Cairnpapple. He was advised to take them to Bevis Bulmer who was working at the Glengonner mines in Leadhills in Scotland. Bulmer found the stones were rich silver ore. Atkinson's story thus credits his friend and employer Bulmer with the discovery.

Atkinson himself joined the works at Hilderston (before August 1607, working for Hamilton and Bulmer). He sent a piece of ore from the "God's Blessing" shaft, apparently with threads of native silver, to his uncle in London. Atkinson claims that his uncle showed it to the Earl of Salisbury at Whitehall Palace who promised to tell King James about it. The silver was like "the hair of a man's head or the grass in the field". It seems unlikely that this could have been the first notion at the royal court that the King's Advocate in Scotland had a working silver mine.

Atkinson says he refined and tried the silver at Hilderston and at the Tower of London. He noted that similar looking rocks varied in silver content. By the time the Germans arrived, who he called "Brunswickers", in 1609, some ore was disappointing. He hoped to find the rich silver seam in a new mine nearby in the future.
