= Henry Evans (theatre) =

Welsh scrivener (c. 1543 – 1612)

- Occupations: Scrivener, theatre impresario
- Years active: 1583–1612

Henry Evans (c. 1543 – after 1612) was the Welsh scrivener and theatrical producer primarily responsible (apparently with the active collaboration of John Lyly) for organising and co-ordinating the activities of the Children of the Chapel and the Children of Paul's at Blackfriars Theatre for a short period in 1583–84. He later led a consortium of investors who leased the theatre during a much longer second phase, after the property was revived by Richard Burbage and Cuthbert Burbage.

Theatre historian David Grote describes Evans as an "unsavoury" and "devious" character who was not above kidnapping young boys to perform in his theatre.

== First Blackfriars ==
In 1583 William Hunnis and John Newman transferred their sub-lease of property in the Blackfriars, which was being legally contested by the owner, Sir William More, to Evans. This was part of a complicated series of transactions apparently designed to ensure that the building could continue to be used as a theatre, something More was attempting to stop. Evans seems to have been working in alliance with John Lyly and his patron Edward de Vere, 17th Earl of Oxford. In 1584 More regained control of the building and stopped performances.

In 1585 Evans was head of the Earl of Oxford's Boys at court.

It has been suggested that during this period Evans may have written the play the Famous Victories of Henry V, one of the principal models for Shakespeare's later plays on the life of Henry. However, the authorship of the play is uncertain.

== Second Blackfriars ==
In partnership with musician Nathaniel Giles, Evans obtained the lease of the Blackfriars property for the second time in 1599, after the building had been acquired by James Burbage, father of Richard and Cuthbert. This helped the Burbages out of a problem, since after their father acquired it in 1596 wealthy local citizens had successfully petitioned to stop the building being used again as a theatre. In consequence, it had been left empty for several years. Evans intended to use it to support a company of boys, as he had before 1590. By installing child "choristers", and setting aside part of building for their education, Evans could claim that the theatre was legally a school: one in which plays happened to be performed. Evans apparently supplemented his choristers by taking talented children from local grammar schools, which he could do because his business partner Nathaniel Giles, Hunnis's successor at the Chapel Royal, had a warrant to provide performers for the queen's entertainment. In 1600 the father of one child attempted to sue Evans for forcing his son to join the Blackfriars troupe.

By April 1602 the business appears to have been in financial difficulty. Evans accepted a deal that he had backed out of a few months earlier, ceding half ownership of the company to three new partners, William Rastell, Edward Kirkham and Thomas Kendall. In return he received an injection of capital. When the plague struck in the following year, Evans tried to give up the lease, but the Burbages refused to release him from the contract. He later ceded the remaining half ownership to three more partners, John Marston, William Strachey and his own wife.

The company was later badly affected when in 1608 the French ambassador Antoine Lefèvre de la Boderie complained to King James I about productions of plays by George Chapman at Blackfriars in which the French court was allegedly treated with disrespect. The ambassador told James that there had also been a play about a Scottish mine in which James himself was portrayed as a drunk. Incensed, James ordered that the Blackfriars children should "never play more, but should first begg their bread". Evans was forced to turn the lease back to the Burbages later in 1608. They took it up for their own company, the King's Men. The deal involved Henry's relative Thomas Evans taking one share in the new partnership, the other six going to members of the King's Men, including the Burbages and Shakespeare.

The transfer of the share to Thomas may have been related to the fact that after the end of the lease two of Evans' old partners engaged in a protracted lawsuit to recover money from him on the grounds that he had breached the agreement with them. Henry himself is listed as the sharer in later cases in 1610 and 1612.

== Significance ==
In addition to his possible authorship of the Famous Victories Evans had an indirect influence on Shakespearean drama. His company of boys has often been seen as a rival to the King's Men, in part because of the apparent attacks on it in Hamlet. However, income from the 1599 lease helped to keep the Globe Theatre afloat at a time when takings were limited and the Burbages were having to make hefty repayments on the loans they had taken out to build and maintain it. The Burbages appear to have trusted Evans despite the fact that the historical record indicates that he "was devious or incompetent even by Elizabethan standards". When Evans finally gave up the lease, and the King's Men moved into Blackfriars, Shakespeare's plays start to undergo significant changes in their structure and style, apparently adapting to the new, more select, audience and the indoor theatre.
