= Guy Lefèvre de la Boderie =

French writer and scholar

- Born: August 9, 1541; Sainte-Honorine-la-Chardonne, France
- Died: June 10, 1598 (aged 56); Sainte-Honorine-la-Chardonne, France
- Known for: Writing

Guy Lefèvre de la Boderie (born in Sainte-Honorine-la-Chardonne in Normandy, 9 August 1541; d. in 1598 in the house in which he was born) was a French Orientalist, Bible scholar and poet.

== Biography ==
He was a son of Jacques Lefèvre de la Boderie and Anne de Montbray; and the brother of the French diplomat, Antoine Lefèvre de la Boderie.

At an early age he devoted himself to the study of Middle Eastern languages, particularly Hebrew and Syriac. After much travelling in different provinces of France he settled down to uninterrupted study under the guidance of the Orientalist Guillaume Postel, who was a professor in the Collège de France. Guy was convinced that study and knowledge were keys to religious faith, in particular in regard to Biblical work. He selected Syriac and Aramaic as his special department in the hope of coming nearer to the mind of Christ by the study of his vernacular. His first published work of importance was a Latin version of the Syriac New Testament published in 1560. This work attracted much attention, and in 1568 Guy was invited by Benito Arias Montano to assist in the production of the Antwerp Polyglot. Guy accepted the invitation and proceeded to Antwerp with his brother Nicolas who was also an Orientalist.

On completing his work in Antwerp in 1572 Lefevre returned to France where he soon obtained the post of secretary and interpreter to the Duke of Alençon. In this position he was brought into close contact with the somewhat radical thought of the period. His associates were men like Antoine de Baif, Jean Daurat, Pierre de Ronsard, Jean Vauquelin de la Fresnaye etc.

Very little is known of Lefèvre's life. It has been conjectured from some words of his in a poem addressed to Marguerite de France that he was a clergyman; and it has been said that Pope Clement VIII wished to make him a cardinal in his last days, but that he declined. He died in the peaceful family mansion of La Boderie in 1598. He wrote this epitaph for himself:

Tandis que j'ai vescu, j'ai toujours souhaité Non d'amasser trésors, mais chercher Verité.

== Works ==
The work assigned to Guy by Arias Montano was the editing of the Syriac New Testament. He examined for this purpose a new manuscript of it which Postel had brought from the East. In 1572 appeared in the fifth volume of the Antwerp Polyglot Bible the result of Lefevre's work, entitled Novum Testamentum syriace, cum versione Latin. This work included the collated Syriac text and Lefevre's previously published (and now amended) Latin version. This work was republished by Le Jay in 1645 in the Paris Polyglot. In 1572 Lefevre published in Antwerp a short Syriac text which he had found accidentally thrown together with the Eastern Biblical manuscript above mentioned. This text, furnished with a Latin translation, appeared under the title D. Seven, Alexandrini, quondam patriarche, de Ritibus baptismi et sacre synaxis apud Syros Christianos receptis liber.

Lefevre tells us (Epistola dedicatoria, p. 4 f.) that he published this text to illustrate the agreement of the ancient Eastern Church with the Western in the important matter of sacramental ritual. To make the little text useful for beginners in Syriac Lefevre vocalized the text and added at the foot of the page a vocalized transliteration in Hebrew characters. In the sixth volume of the Antwerp Polyglot appeared a further work by Lefevre, Grammatica chaldaica et Dictionarium Syro-Chaldaicum. In the same year 1572, Lefevre published, also in Antwerp, a short introduction to Syriac, Syriace 1ingue prima elementa. This work is little more than an account of the names of the consonants and vowel signs with a few easy texts.

In 1584 Lefèvre published a transliteration in Hebrew characters of the Syriac New Testament, Novum J. Chr. Testamentum, syriace litteris hebraicis, cum versione Latin' interlineari. In this work the Vulgate and Greek texts were printed at the foot of the page. Lefevre was not merely a philologist, he also wrote poetry, usually expressing his support for Catholicism - Vauquelin de La Fresnaye described him as a 'poete tout chrestien'. Among his poetry is: L'Encyclie des secrets de l'Eternité (Antwerp, 1571), an apology of Christianity; La Galliade, ou de la révolution des arts et sciences (Paris, 1578; 2nd ed. 1582). which celebrates the return to France of the banished sciences; Hymnes ecclésiastiques and Cantiques spirituels et autres mélanges poétiques (Paris, 1578–1582), many of which are translations from the Italian; L'Harmonie du Monde (Paris, 1578), a translation of Francesco Giorgi's De harmonia mundi totius cantica tria (orig. publ. Venice, 1525).

He made use of passages from the Zohar in his Hymnes.

Lefevre published in his last years a large number of translations from Latin, Italian, Spanish etc., in verse and prose. Most of these translations are apologetic.
