= Antoine Lefèvre de la Boderie =

French diplomat and ambassador to England

France Ambassador to England
- In office 1606–1613
- Preceded by: Christophe de Harlay, Count of Beaumont
- Succeeded by: Samuel Spifame, Sieur des Bisseaux

Personal details
- Born: 1555
- Died: 1615 (aged 59–60)
- Spouse: Jeanne Le Prevost
- Children: Catherine
- Parents: Jacques Lefèvre de la Boderie (father); Anne de Montbray (mother)
- Relatives: Simon Arnauld, Marquis de Pomponne (grandson)

Antoine Lefèvre de la Boderie (1555-1615) was a French diplomat and ambassador to England.

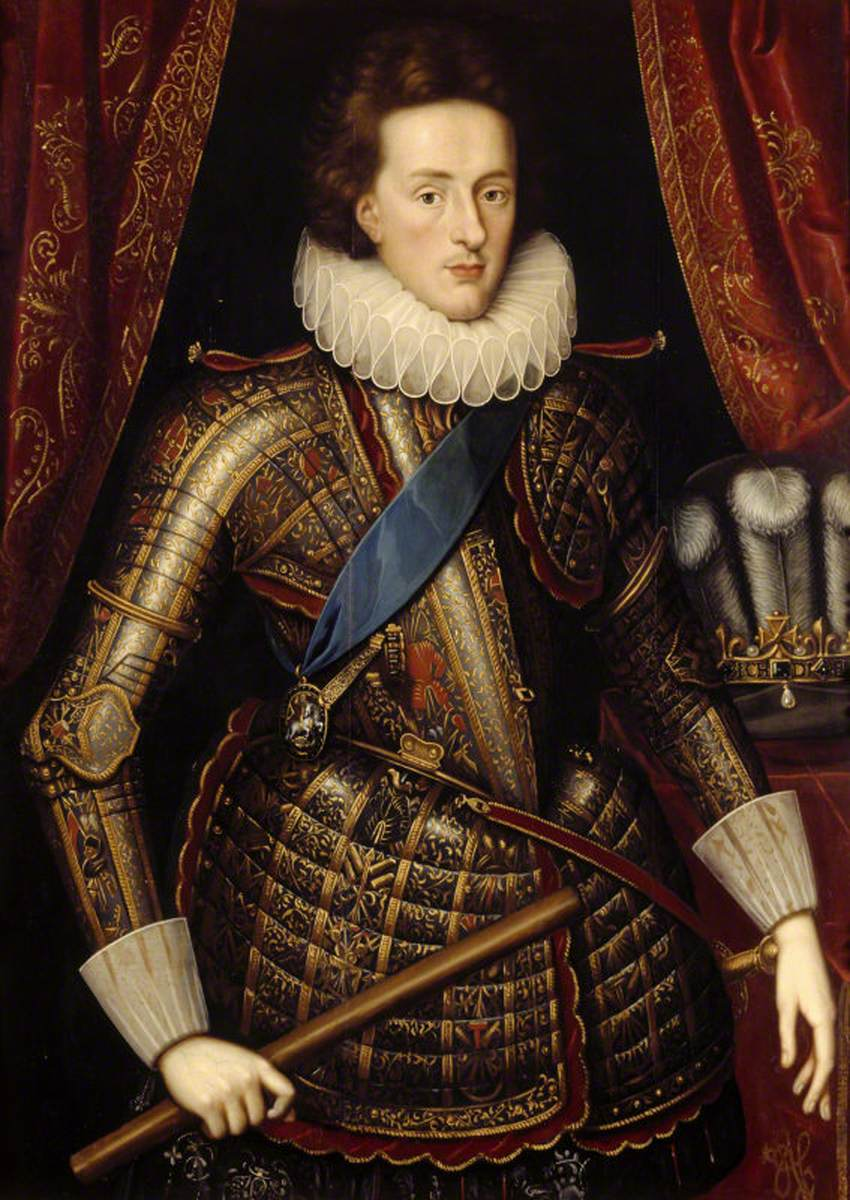
Prince Henry, possibly depicted wearing armour procured by Antoine Lefèvre de la Boderie, Dunster Castle

He was a son of Jacques Lefèvre de la Boderie and Anne de Montbray; and the brother of the French Orientalist, Guy Lefèvre de la Boderie.

== Career ==
Lefèvre de la Boderie was a master of household to Henry IV of France. In January 1598 he welcomed Sir Robert Cecil as ambassador to France at Dieppe. He was French ambassador to Rome, and ambassador in England from April 1606 until 1611. His correspondence from these years was published in the 18th century with Lettres d'Henri IV et de Messieurs de Villeroy, et de Puisieux à Mr. Antoine Le Fevre de la Boderie Ambassadeur de France en Angleterre in 1733, and the 5 volume Ambassades de Monsieur de la Boderie en Angleterre in 1750.

Boderie is known for his commentary on politics in London during the reign of James VI and I. Boderie was particularly surprised by the hunting activity of King James, who regularly absented himself from the apparent centres of power to country residences.

In 1606, Boderie noted that Prince Henry played golf, which he described as a Scottish game not unlike "pallemail" or pall-mall. Boderie also mentioned exercises with the pike and archery.

Prince Henry's riding master, Monsieur St Antoine, asked Boderie to obtain a suit of gilt armour with a pistol and sword for the prince. The armour is thought to survive in the Royal Collection. Another French armour made for Henry as a gift from the Prince de Joinville also survives.

=== Lefèvre de la Boderie and the Nottingham scandal ===
Christian IV of Denmark visited his sister, Anne of Denmark, the wife of King James in London in 1606. Boderie reported that some celebrations and tournaments would be cancelled because of the death of Anne's daughter Sophia. When Christian IV was preparing to leave England he had an argument with the Earl of Nottingham aboard ship about time and tide. The Danish king insisted it was two o'clock and waved two fingers at the Earl. Nottingham, or his wife Margaret Howard, Countess of Nottingham, thought he made a joke about their age difference. An angry correspondence ensued.

Arbella Stuart attempted to mediate in the scandal in letters to Christian's Scottish chamberlain, Sir Andrew Sinclair. Anne of Denmark asked James to banish the Countess of Nottingham from court.

Lefèvre de la Boderie was aware of the details of this quarrel and described it in his letters. He wrote of the age difference between Lady Nottingham and the Admiral. He described the argument on the Thames centering on a clock and the time of departure, and Christian IV two or three times indicating the time two o'clock with his fingers. Lefèvre de la Boderie knew that the Countess of Nottingham had written to Sinclair, and Anne of Denmark had expelled her from court, berating her as the grandchild of an illegitimate son of James V, (as a granddaughter of James Stewart, 1st Earl of Moray). His letters are an important source for our knowledge of the incident. Lefèvre de la Boderie said Anne of Denmark made the Earl and Countess of Nottingham unwelcome at their lodge in the park of Hampton Court in September. Boderie's version of these events was a source of amusement to Henry IV of France.

=== Plague in 1606 ===
According to Lefèvre de la Boderie, in October 1606 Anne of Denmark was alarmed by the death of a servant in the buttery at Hampton Court, and intended to move to Oatlands. She discovered the plague was also in that vicinity and wanted to move to Greenwich Palace, but the plague was there too. She stayed at Hampton Court and sent Prince Charles to join Prince Henry at Richmond Palace. Anne of Denmark kept King James, who was at Royston, informed by messages sent with the Scottish courtiers Robert Anstruther and John Auchmoutie. James was happy with Anne's decision but some courtiers were critical. The Venetian ambassador Zorzi Giustinian also reported her decision.

Boderie regarded Anne of Denmark's secretary William Fowler as a useful source of information, worthy of cultivation, describing him as an "Ecossais et un galant homme, que je desir bien entretenir". Boderie reported the arrest of Anne of Denmark's Scottish chamberer Margaret Hartsyde, describing her offence as slander rather than the theft of the queen's jewels.

=== Anne of Denmark and the French royal baptism ===
On 15 July 1608, at Somerset House, Boderie presented to Anne of Denmark an invitation to the baptism of Gaston, Duke of Anjou, a son of Henry IV and his second wife, Marie de' Medici. She was to be a godparent by proxy. The Republic of Venice would stand as the other godparent or sponsor. Anne of Denmark spoke to the Venetian ambassador Zorzi Giustinian about the invitation, assuring him that despite this token of alliance with France, she did not intend there to be a matrimonial alliance with France. Instead, she hoped her daughter Princess Elizabeth would marry an Italian or German husband.

There had been some diplomatic wrinkles in the previous months. Boderie felt that he had been slighted by Anne of Denmark's show of favour to the Spanish ambassador at The Masque of Beauty in January. Sir Henry de Gunderot or Guenterode, a German-born soldier and gentleman of King James's privy chamber associated with Anne of Denmark's brother the Duke of Holstein, had been sent as a diplomatic envoy to the French court. According to the Venetian ambassador in Paris, Antonio Foscarini, Henry IV gained the impression from Gunderot, who he called "Signor Ghintrot", that Anne of Denmark favoured Spain rather than France and blamed him for this.

Among the ensuing correspondence, Henry IV wrote to Boderie about Gunderot, hoping he could smooth things over and still hoped Anne of Denmark would be a godparent by proxy to his son. Boderie thought some issues could not be committed to the "hazard of paper". The French minister Pierre Brûlart de Puisieux wrote to Boderie with news that Anne of Denmark had written to Henry IV to disavow the speeches Gunderot had made. Puisieux wrote to Boderie to expect a present of little dogs for the English queen. She had asked Boderie for a couple of the smallest and most beautiful dogs.

In November 1608, Boderie noted that Anne of Denmark defended Lord Balmerino, who was accused of sending letters to the Pope in the king's name without authority. In February 1609, Boderie attended The Masque of Queens. Conflict over the invitations and precedence was avoided by the departure of the savoy ambassador Ferdinand de Girone. Boderie dined with King James and Prince Henry and Charles, while his wife dined with Princess Elizabeth. During the masque, Anne of Denmark spoke to Boderie's wife and daughter, and his daughter joined the dance. The Venetian ambassador was not invited and in Venice, Henry Wotton had to make excuses, saying that the English ambassador in Paris had been singled out for an invitation to Marie de' Medici's dance.

Boderie's invitation and the masque marked a period of friendship between England and France. Puisieux and the Marquis of Villeroy wrote to Boderie acknowledging the role that court theatre had played in ongoing negotiations for a European peace treaty. It was hoped there would be a marriage between French and English royals.

=== Scottish silver mine ===
Boderie wrote several times several times about enthusiasm for a promising silver mine in Scotland (at Hilderston) and the results of assays of ore from this "mine d'Ecosse". He commented sourly that even unprofitable silver mines were a public benefit by the creation of employment.

In September 1609, Boderie returned to France for a time. King James gave him a gold basin and ewer, made by the Welsh goldsmith John Williams. It is said that Anne of Denmark gave his wife, Jeanne le Prévost, the string of pearls that she was wearing.

=== Final years ===
He was in London again in January 1610 and awaited the return of King James from Royston. In February 1610 he attended a banquet with the Venetian ambassadors. King James wore a jewel on his hat with five large diamonds, possibly the Mirror of Great Britain. In March, Lefèvre de la Boderie was concerned by the fate of four French vine-dressers aboard ships about to sail for Virginia with the Governor General, Lord De La Warr. They had not been told that they had contracted to serve in the New World.

Lefèvre de la Boderie wrote that when King James heard the news of the assassination of Henry IV of France, he turned whiter than his shirt.

Antoine Lefèvre de la Boderie died in 1615.

He married Jeanne Le Provost in 1595. Their daughter Catherine (died 1635), married Robert Arnauld d'Andilly in 1613. Their son was Simon Arnauld, Marquis de Pomponne.

== Boderie and the London stage ==
Antoine Lefèvre de la Boderie was offended by George Chapman's, The Conspiracy and Tragedy of Charles, Duke of Byron, and complained to King James. He was particularly irritated by a scene in which the French Queen slapped the face of her husband's mistress. Ambassadors in London quarreled about invitations to court masques, the root of the difficulty was the idea of precedence, that another diplomat might be appear to enjoy higher status and favour.

Boderie mentions a play about a silver mine, performed in March or Lenten term 1608, by the Children of the Queen's Revels, and promptly closed after offending King James. The text has not survived. Boderie wrote that it slandered James, his Scottish mine, and his favourites. The play may have been themed around a new silver mine at Hilderston in Scotland which King James had recently taken into his own hands, as described in the letters of Sir Thomas Hamilton. Some scholars suggest that Boderie's mention of a Scottish mine, the King's mine d'Escosse in the play, was not primarily a reference to Hilderston, but rather to James' homosocial personal relations.

During hearings in Venice about the possible misconduct of the ambassador Antonio Foscarini, it was noted that Zorzi Giustinian had attended a performance of Pericles, accompanied by Antoine Lefèvre de la Boderie and his wife, and Octavian Lotti, the secretary of the Florentine ambassador.
