= Sainte-Honorine-la-Chardonne =

- Commune
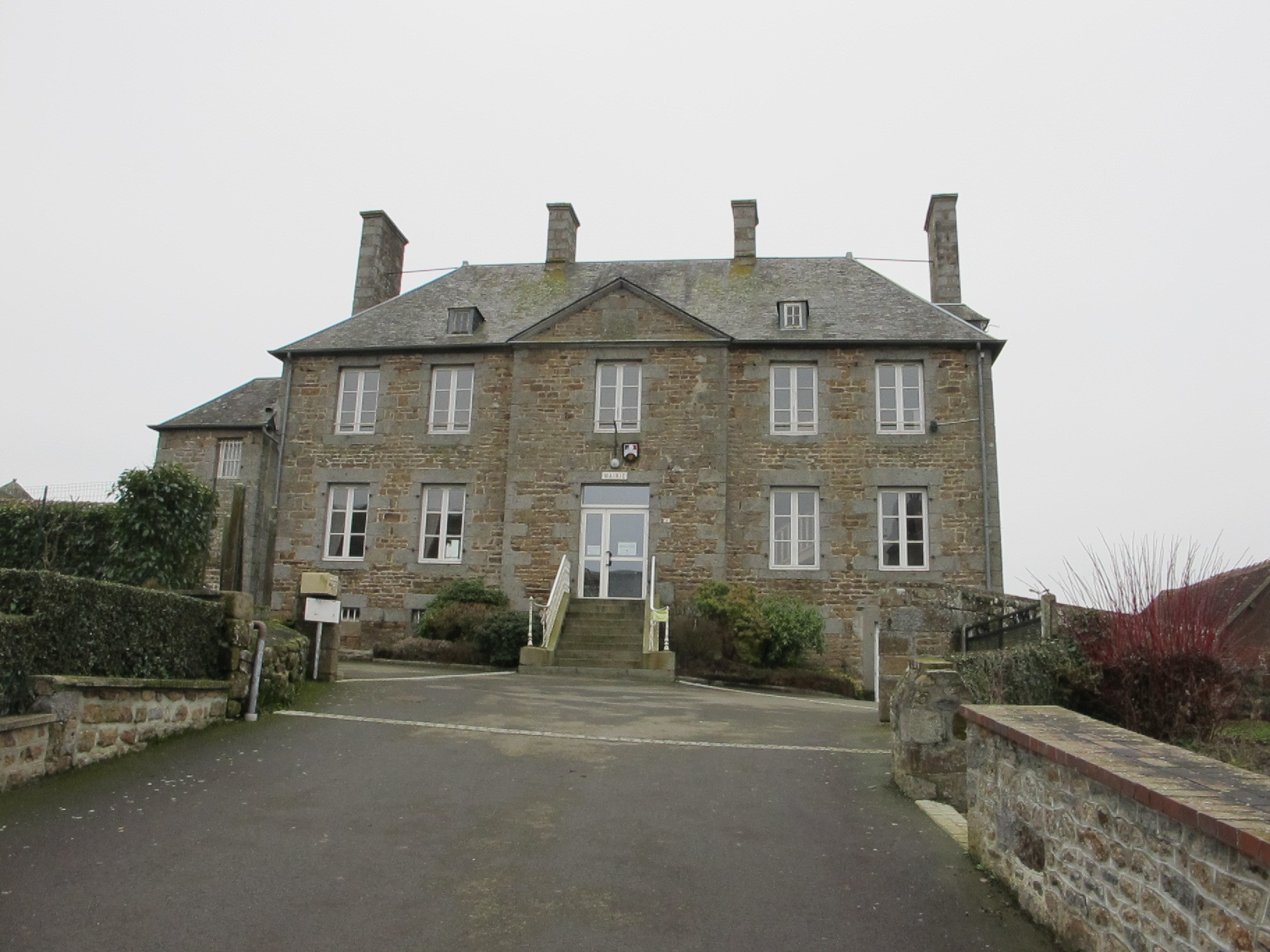
- The town hall in Sainte-Honorine-la-Chardonne
- Location of Sainte-Honorine-la-Chardonne
- Location within France Location within Normandy
- Coordinates: 48°49′29″N 0°29′04″W
- Country: France
- Region: Normandy
- Department: Orne
- Arrondissement: Argentan
- Canton: Athis-Val de Rouvre
- Intercommunality: CA Flers Agglo

Government
  - Mayor (2020–2026): Emmanuel Le Secq
- Area^{1}: 14.4 km^{2} (5.6 sq mi)
- Elevation: 235 m (771 ft)
- Highest elevation: 251 m (823 ft)
- Lowest elevation: 78 m (256 ft)
- Population (2023): 684
  - Density: 47.5/km^{2} (123/sq mi)
- Time zone: UTC+01:00 (CET)
  - Summer (DST): UTC+02:00 (CEST)
- INSEE/Postal code: 61407 /61430
- ^{1} French Land Register data, which excludes lakes, ponds, glaciers > 1 km^{2} (0.386 sq mi or 247 acres) and river estuaries.

Sainte-Honorine-la-Chardonne is a commune in the Orne department in north-western France.

== Geography ==
The commune is part of the area known as Suisse Normande.

The commune is made up of the following collection of villages and hamlets, La Barbotière,Cingal, La Pouplière, Les Petits Champs,La Soubinière,La Ferté, Le Châtellier, La Forgé Martin, La Rivière, La Pérée, La Bernottière, La Grésillière, Laubenière and Sainte-Honorine-la-Chardonne.

The only two watercourses to run through the commune are La Vere and La Courteille.

== Notable buildings and places ==
Renaissance Garden of Sainte-Honorine-la-Chardonne is a 5000m2 garden built around the ruins of the Manoir de la Boisnerie and is open to the public. The garden was classed as a Jardins remarquables by the Ministry of Culture and the Comité des Parcs et Jardins de France in 2021.

=== National heritage sites ===
Château de Saint-Sauveur is a 16th Century Chateau that was classed as a Monument historique in 2009.

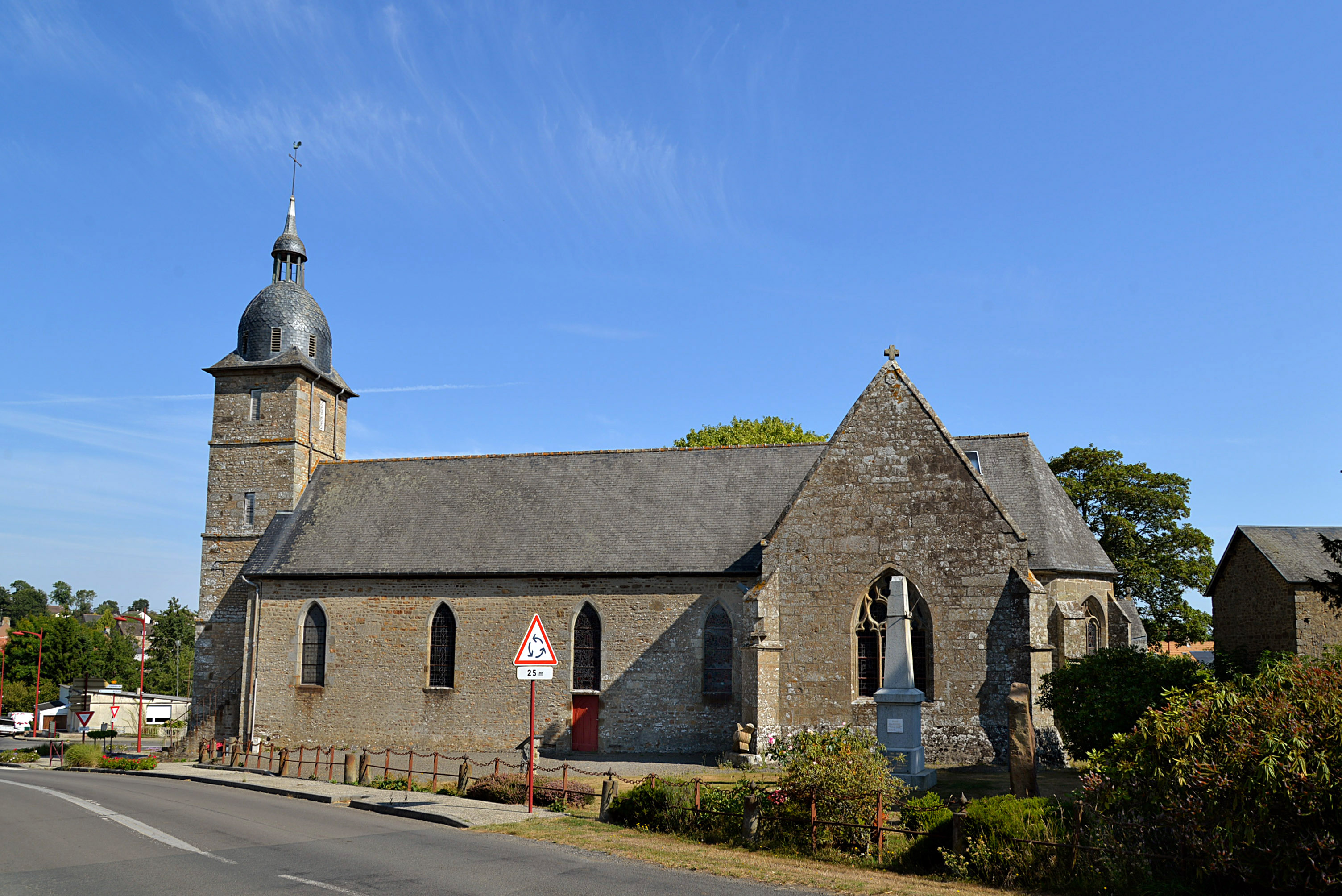
Sainte-Honorine Church in Sainte-Honorine-la-Chardonne

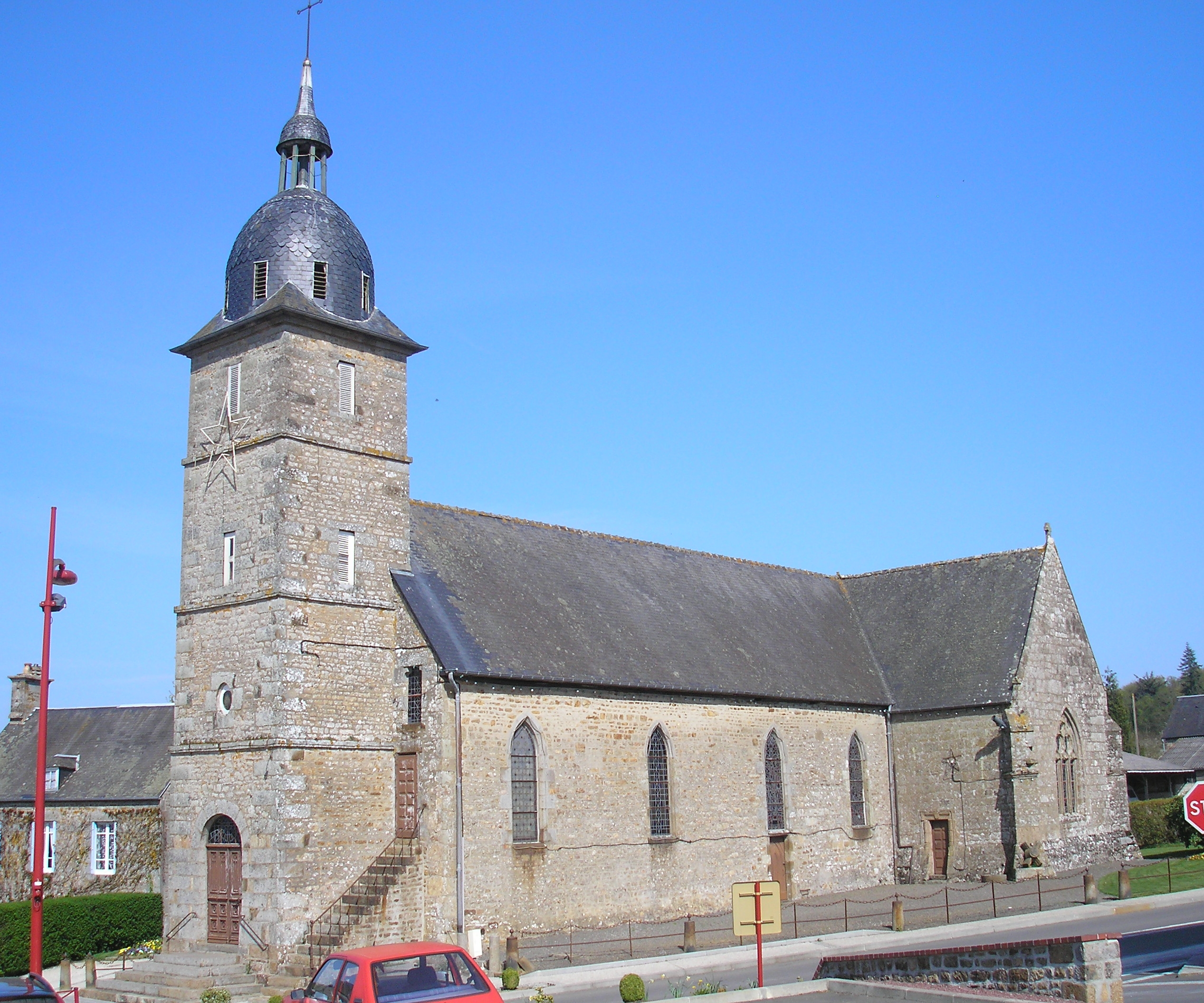
Saint Honorine Church

== Notable people ==
- Guy Lefèvre de la Boderie a 16th century French Orientalist, Bible scholar and poet was born here.
- Guillaume Martin is a French professional cyclist who has competed in all 3 Grand tours, winning the Mountains classification in the Vuelta a España grew up here as a child and continues to have a presence here.

== See also ==
- Communes of the Orne department
