= Zorzi Giustinian =

Zorzi Giustinian was an ambassador of the Republic of Venice serving in London from 1606 to 1608 and Vienna in 1618.

== London ==
Giustinian arrived in London on 5 January 1606, met by the outgoing ambassador Nicolò Molin and Lewes Lewknor, the master of ceremonies. They had an audience with King James on 25 January, "escorted by almost all the Italians resident in London". John Pory described the event and the ambassadors' black gowns, lined with black fox fur.

In February, he was asked to congratulate King James on his escape from the Gunpowder Plot, the details of which had been explained to the Doge in Venice by the English ambassador Henry Wotton. Anne of Denmark showed an eager interest in the struggles between the Venetian Republic and the Papacy, but Giustinian was reluctant to discuss the issues.

Giustinian was apprehensive of new legal measures in the aftermath of the plot, which seemed to be "great preparations for the annihilation of the Catholic religion". In March King James went over the details of the plot with him at length, especially emphasising the role of divine providence in his miraculous preservation.

Anthony Standen, lately a prisoner in the Tower of London, arrived in Rome in March 1606, and said that Anne of Denmark enjoyed listening to Nicolò Molin and Giustinian speaking Italian. In April Giustinian reported the wild rumour that King James had been assassinated at Woking Palace. A few days later, Lewes Lewknor brought an invitation to watch a tournament. Giustinian was anxious about precedence on these occasions, worried that other ambassadors might be seen publicly to enjoy more favour than him. Lewknor reassured him that each ambassador would have a window in the gallery overlooking the tiltyard. Giustinian argued that the right-hand window would be more prestigious. Lewknor found this intractable and begged him to make excuses and not turn up.

He visited Princess Elizabeth at Greenwich Palace on 5 August 1606. Christian IV of Denmark came to London in August, but despite the hunting, fêtes, tournaments and other daily entertainments, Giustinian reported that the Danish king and his followers appeared bored. He went to Theobalds to seek an audience, where his secretary found King James taking a prolonged dinner according the German custom, and the Earl of Salisbury pointed at the table and said that two days were dedicated to feasting and the Danes must not be interrupted.

Giustinian corresponded with the Chancellor of Scotland, Alexander Seton, 1st Earl of Dunfermline and sent him pamphlets written in defence of the Venetian Republic. Seton, despite his education in Rome with Bellarmine, wrote to him approving the Venetian cause. He heard that the Scots wrote to King James to protest against a union. In May 1607 Giustanini successfully requested the suppression and burning of a pamphlet printed by Francis Burton, News from Venice, which misrepresented religious practice in Venice. In July Prince Henry showed him around Nonsuch Palace and promised to show him his amusements and exercises on his next visit.

Giustinian was impressed with The Masque of Beauty and attributed its success to Anne of Denmark as "authoress of the whole" rather than Ben Jonson. In June 1608 Giustinian saw the Earl of Montgomery and George Home, 1st Earl of Dunbar go in procession from London to Windsor Castle for their investiture. The royal family watched the procession from Cecil House on the Strand. Giustinian noted that English courtiers were jealous of honours awarded to Scots.

During hearings in Venice about the possible misconduct of another ambassador Antonio Foscarini, it was noted that Giustianian had attended a performance of Pericles, accompanied by the French ambassador Antoine Lefèvre de la Boderie and his wife, and Octavian Lotti, the secretary of the Florentine ambassador. He spent the equivalent of 20 scudi on this entertainment.

His successor as ambassador in London, Marc' Antonio Correr, was chosen in August 1608.

He was ambassador in Vienna in 1618.
