= Sexuality of James VI and I =

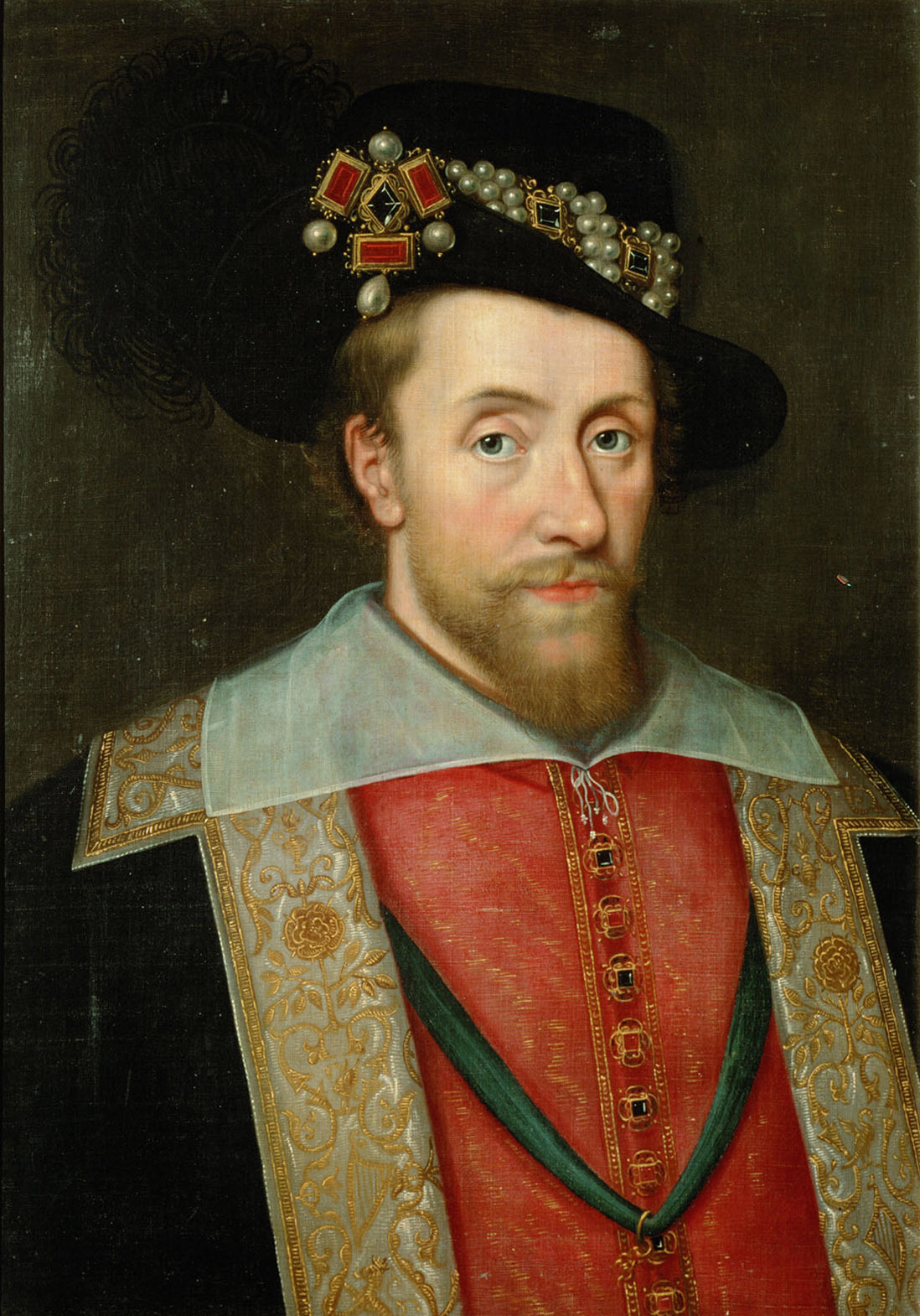
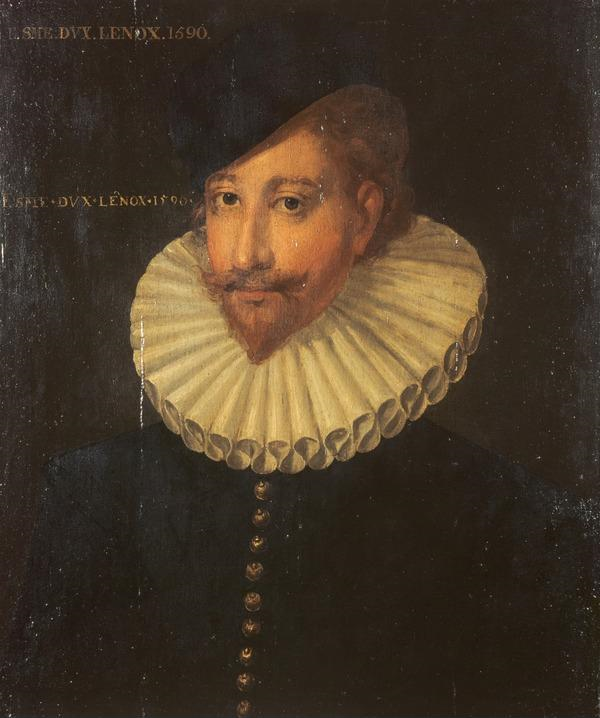
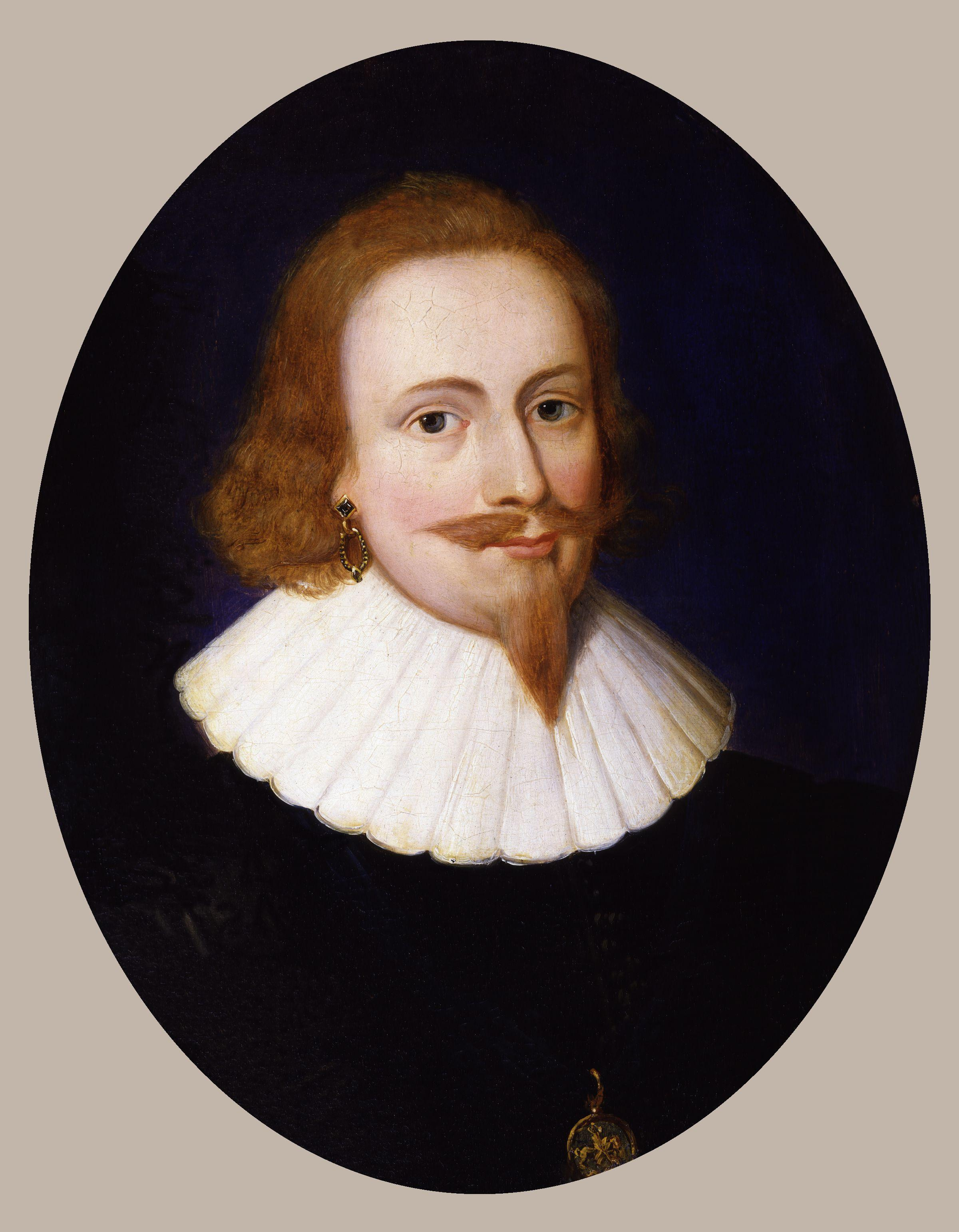
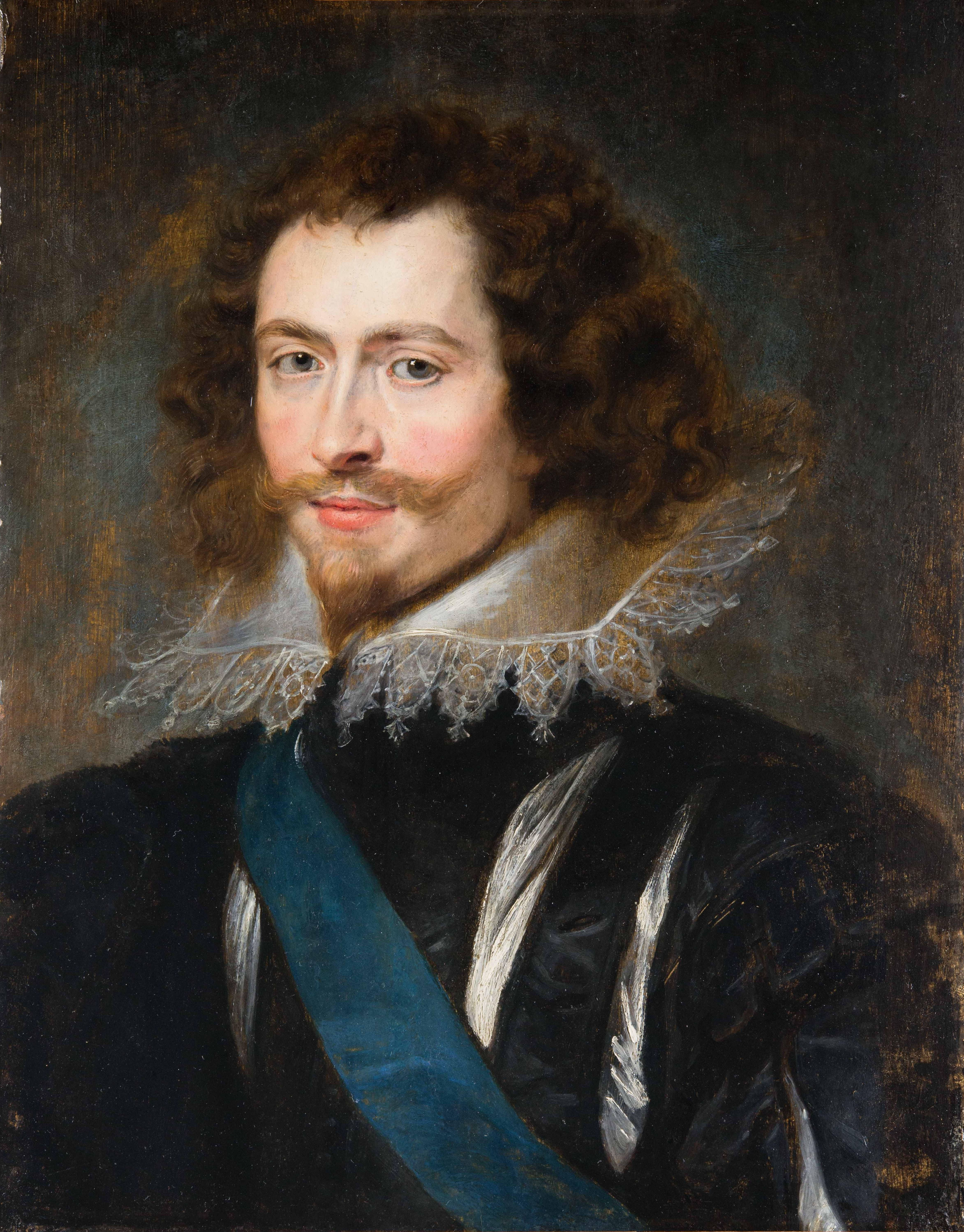
Portraits of James and his most well-known favourites, left to right: James VI and I, Esmé Stewart, Robert Carr, George Villiers

From the age of thirteen until his death, the life of King James VI of Scotland and I of England (1566–1625) was characterised by close relationships with a series of male favourites.

The influence James's favourites had on politics, and the resentment at the wealth they acquired, became major political issues during his reign. The extent to which the King's relationships with the men were sexual was a topic of bawdy contemporary speculation.

James certainly enjoyed the company of handsome young men, sometimes shared his bed with his favourites and was often passionate in his expressions of love for them. James was married to Anne of Denmark, with whom he fathered eight children. He railed fiercely against sodomy. In Basilikon Doron, he addressed to his son that "so is there some horrible crimes that yee are bound in conscience neuer to forgiue : such as...Sodomie."

Most historians and commentators today affirm that, given the evidence, James's relationships with some or all of his favourites were sexual. Others regard the evidence as more ambiguous, and needing to be understood in terms of 17th century forms of masculinity.

The question of James' sexuality might be considered less important than the political consequences of the power and status he granted his favourites. That said, since the late 20th century, historical analysis and commentary on James's personal life has raised important questions about how early modern same-sex relationships (whether sexual or friendship-based) were structured and understood, and the extent to which modern categories of sexuality can be applied to historical figures.

== Views on James' relationships and sexual behaviour ==
=== Views of modern historians ===
Until the late 20th century, historians' accounts were often biased by prevailing negative social attitudes towards same-sex relationships. Historians could not avoid the implication that James was attracted to men. Some would refer — usually obliquely and certainly judgmentally — to possible sexual interactions with his favourites. Moral condemnation by historians of James's homoerotic attraction was often part of a wider characterisation of him as a bad or weak king. From the 1980s, positive reassessments of James's reign coincided with growing public acceptance of homosexuality. The issue of James' sexuality began to be separated from questions about his character, judgement and reign. By the late 20th century, the consensus was to see the relationships between James and his favourites as sexual. In the 1990s a countering view arose, where some academics argued that many of the key points of evidence cited in favour of the relationships being sexual — such as James sharing a bed or exchanging kisses with his favourites — were behaviours that in James' time were widely seen as public tokens of friendship.

Summarising the views of early 21st century historians, social historian Emma Dabiri stated in 2017 that few historians and biographers now doubt that James was "either gay or bisexual". (Note: When reviewing opinions about King James's sexuality, Michael B. Young advised caution and forbearance because some historians anachronistically use "modern binary constructs for sexuality" – that is, for them, the question is whether James was homosexual – when the question should be "whether his sexual relations followed the pederastic or sodomitical patterns of his own day or, to be even more neutral, simply whether he engaged in sex with other males".) John Matusiak's 2015 biography James I: Scotland's King of England views James as "homosexual", although is unsure about the "precise extent of the king's sexual involvement with Lennox". Keith Coleman's 2023 biography James VI and I: The King Who United Scotland and England, sees James's relationships with Somerset and Buckingham as sexual, adding that his relationship with Lennox probably also was. Steven Veerapen, author of 2023's The Wisest Fool: The Lavish Life of James VI and I, also views James's relationships with his favourites as sexual, describing the king as, in modern terms, bisexual, with a "strong preference for men".

Along with 2010-2020s historians, Gareth Russell's opinion is that "James and Villiers were indeed passionate lovers". Benjamin Woolley, biographer of Villiers, says the language the King and Villiers used with each other in their letters "clearly shows a very deep, complex, probably sexual relationship between them". Reviewing James's letters and poems and focusing on desire rather than actions, David M. Bergeron sees James's relationships with Lennox, Somerset and Buckingham comprising a "special intimacy, including, but not restricted to, homoerotic desire", with James's letters to his male favourites as "signs of erotic desire [and] same-sex love".

=== Contemporary accounts ===
I discussed with [my friend things] that were secret as of the sin of sodomy, how frequent it was in this wicked city, and if God did not provide some wonderful blessing against it, we could not but expect some horrible punishment for it; especially it being[,] as we had probable cause to fear, a sin in the prince.

— Sir Simonds d'Ewes (1622)

It was generally believed by James's contemporaries that his relationships with his favourites were sexual and "[t]he impression that James and his favorites were engaged in sex was widespread".

"Gossip and concerns over deviant sexuality" was not new (similar denouncements were made of Queen Elizabeth I's favourites) but, according to Cezara Bobeica, "Under James, the novelty was the exponential increase of such accusations of sodomy". Commentary on James's "erotic interactions with his favourites" was not always speculative but, rather, as Michael B. Young notes, was based on observation of James "hugging, falling upon the necks of, and kissing his favourites in public."

Contemporaries observed James's interactions with his favourites and commented on them in their journals, letters and reports. For instance, commenting generally, Albert Fontenay wrote that James's "love for favourites is indiscreet and wilful"; and John Hacket wrote that James would, from his mid-teens, "clasp someone [...] in the Embraces of his great Love", and that this began first with Esmé Stewart, 1st Duke of Lennox. Commenting on James's public affection towards Stewart, Sir Henry Widdrington recorded that James "can hardly suffer him out of his presence, and is in such love with him, as in the open sight of the people, oftentimes he will clasp him about the neck with his arms and kiss him". Others commented that James was "carried away" by, or in the "possession" of, Stewart. David Moysie wrote in his memoirs that James, "having conceived an inward affection to [Stewart], entered in great familiarity and quiet purposes with him" (David Harris Willson notes that "great familiarity and quiet purposes" bears a "special connotation in the Scots idiom of the time" to sexual interactions). Similarly, Thomas Fowler reported that James "kissed [the Earl of Huntly] at times to the amazement of many", adding that "It is thought this King is too much carried by young men that lie in his chamber and are his minions".

Concerning James and Robert Carr's interactions, Thomas Howard reported that James "leans on [Carr's] arm, touches his cheeks, smooths his ruffled garment". Of James and his favourites – and especially George Villiers – the diarist John Oglander recorded that James "loved young men, his favourites, better than women, loving them beyond the love of men to women. I never saw any fond husband make so much or so great dalliance over his beautiful spouse as I have seen King James over his favourites, especially the Duke of Buckingham". The Venetian ambassador also reported that James had given Villiers "all his heart, who will not eat, sup or remain an hour without him and considers him his whole joy". Following one masque, at which Villiers and James's son Charles danced and impressed the King, the ambassador reported that James, while showing affection to Charles, "honoured the marquis [i.e., Villiers] with marks of extraordinary affection, patting his face".

Similar sources also commented on what drew James's attention in the men around him, namely effeminate appearances. Thomas Howard commented that James "does admire good fashion in clothes" and "dwells on good looks and handsome accoutrements", citing Robert Carr as an example of someone successful in catching the King's attention because he "changed his tailors and tiremen many times, and all to please the Prince". Carr, Howard described, was "straight-limbed, well-favoured, strong-shouldered, and smooth-faced". The French ambassador Tillières reported James's passion was for men with beautiful faces, preferably without facial hair. Later in the century, the royalist historian the Earl of Clarendon wrote of James, "yet, of all wise men living, he was the most delighted and taken with handsome persons and with fine clothes"; and that Buckingham's "first introduction into favour was purely from the handsomeness of his person", on whom the King showered honours and wealth on because "of the beauty and gracefulness and becomingness of his person".

Knowing to whom James was attracted, rival factions within the Jacobean court "sought influence with the king by promoting handsome young men whom they hoped would gain his favour". A former favourite of James, James Hay, for instance, "dangled [Robert Carr] under the king's nose [...] in an attempt to undermine" those who currently had the ascendancy with him." In turn, William Herbert and the Archbishop of Canterbury George Abbot "exploited [George Villiers's] charms to displace the previous royal favourite, Robert Carr" (to do so, Villiers made himself more effete, "clean-shaven, and with his long, elegant legs prominently displayed"); and Villiers's "rivals at court sought his downfall by tempting James with other pretty young men". For instance, in 1618 the Howard family tried to use Sir William Monson to topple and replace Villiers (Monson's backers wanted to "set [...] up this new idol" and took "great pains in tricking and pranking him up, besides washing his face every day with posset-curd") and, in 1622, Lionel Cranfield tried to do likewise using Arthur Brett, though both attempts failed.

Insinuations about James's sexual acts with other men followed him throughout his life. Comments were made in a variety of sources other than reports and diaries. In 1592, anonymous verses written against James were discovered, calling him a "bougerer" and alleging he had no physical interaction with his wife, leaving her all night intactam. Curtis Perry, in a 2000 article on "The Politics of Access and Representations of the Sodomite King in Early Modern England", states that "[S]odomitical images of James I [were] promulgated in manuscript verse libels, mean-spirited memoirs, and political pamphlets written by disgruntled contemporaries". While some of these are suspect as they were written by those opposed to James's favourites to slander them, particularly through a literary convention attributing all kinds of evils to them (which is Perry's concern in his article), other sources are more trustworthy as they are less susceptible to such literary conventions.

When James ascended the English throne in 1603, an epigram circulated in London: "Elizabeth was King: now James is Queen". According to the Italian historian Gregorio Leti the epigram was written on the door of his cabinet and was a pasquinade referring to the unusual natures of both Elizabeth and James. The Puritan diarist Simonds d'Ewes wrote in 1622 of his concern that "the sin of sodomy" had become "a sin in the prince as well as the people". The following year, Huguenot poet Théophile de Viau observed from France that "it is well known that the king of England / fucks the Duke of Buckingham". A poem called To Buckinghame references sodomy in its "buck-in-game" pun, (Note: Early Stuart Libels says there are "hints of sodomy" in the pun; Jonathan Healey calls it a "fairly explicit reference to anal sex",) with one version proclaiming at the end of the poem that the king loves the favourite "Solely, for your looke".

Two poems that relate James and Buckingham's relationship to Ganymede, a male mortal from Greek mythology with whom Zeus falls in love, are the poems that "most explicitly alleged a homosexual relationship between the King and his "Ganymede" favourite". One of the poems, by Alexander Gill the Younger, asks God to save "my sovereign from a Ganymede / Whose Whorish breath hath power to lead / His Majesty which way it lists" – the author rightly commented that the poem expressed what many thought. The other poem depicts the, for the poet, dire consequences of the king's rumoured sexual relationship with Buckingham through imagery of "the moral and political disorder that plagues the court of Jove [i.e., Jupiter], king of the gods, as a result of the King's sexual infatuation with the Trojan boy Ganymede". With the poem's charge of sodomy, the other gods, at war with Jove (who "with Ganymede lies playing", oblivious to the impending punishment for "loving so 'gainst nature") "threaten without mercy / To have him burned / That so hath turned / Love's pleasure arsy versy" (or "arse wise"). Another poem portrays parliament as James's loyal wife and the King as her husband who's been unfaithful to her by being a Ganymede – the passive partner – to Buckingham, thereby leaving himself open to being sodomized by Spain and the Popery.

It is possible comments were also made about the age differences between James and his favourites Carr (Earl of Somerset) and Buckingham – there was at least 20 years between them. For instance, while it cannot be proved without doubt that it referred to James and his favourites, Thomas Carew wrote a masque celebrating the "conjugal affection" between James's son Charles I and Henrietta Maria of France, potentially contrasting it with James and his favourites, saying the example of Charles and Henrietta Maria's marriage inspired Jupiter to ban the love of boys from his heavenly court: "Ganimede is forbidden the Bedchamber. [...] The Gods must keepe no Pages, nor Groomes of their Chamber under the age of 25". Michael B. Young comments, "Carr and Villiers, in their early twenties, would have been banished under this rule".

In 1627, Dominick Roche, an alderman of Limerick, said the King of Spain broke off the Spanish match when he discovered James and his son, Charles, committed "unnatural crimes" with Buckingham, with the King of Spain "knowing them to be guilty of so foul a sin".

=== James's condemnation of sodomy ===
In James's 1599 book on kingship, Basilikón Dōron, James listed crimes that were treasonous and warranted death, including sodomy.

Alan Bray argues that the modern concept of homosexuality has clouded understanding of the renaissance concept of sodomy. Sodomy may be better understood in modern terms as "debauchery", representing not just sexual behaviour but a disruption of the social order. In James' time, "friendship between men was understood to be the key public relationship, the very stuff of civility and social order". As such, intimate relations between men, which may or may not have involved sexual elements, could be cast positively as friendship, or, where they disrupted the social order, negatively as sodomy. In this reading, accusations of sodomy levelled against James arose as a result of the disruptive power that he granted his favourites. Meanwhile, the King may have seen sex with his favourites as a patriarchal right: Jonathan Goldberg argues that Basilikon Doron is proof that "sodomy was so fully politicized that no king could possibly apply the term to himself."

In his work King James and the History of Homosexuality, Young suggests simpler arguments to explain the King's strong rejection of sodomy. James may simply have been a hypocrite on the matter. Alternatively, the legal definition of sodomy related only to anal intercourse, and the King may have indulged in other behaviours with men (such as mutual masturbation) that today would be seen as homosexual but would then not have been seen as sodomy. John Philipps Kenyon comments that despite, in James's time, the stigma placed on sex between men, "homosexuality was an imperial vice [...] and [...] sexual indulgence alone has rarely contributed to the downfall of rulers, or even noticeably undermined their prestige." Despite his expressed views on sodomy, it appears that convictions for the crime of sodomy were very seldom enacted.

== Relationships and sexual behaviour with women ==
=== Wife: Anne of Denmark ===
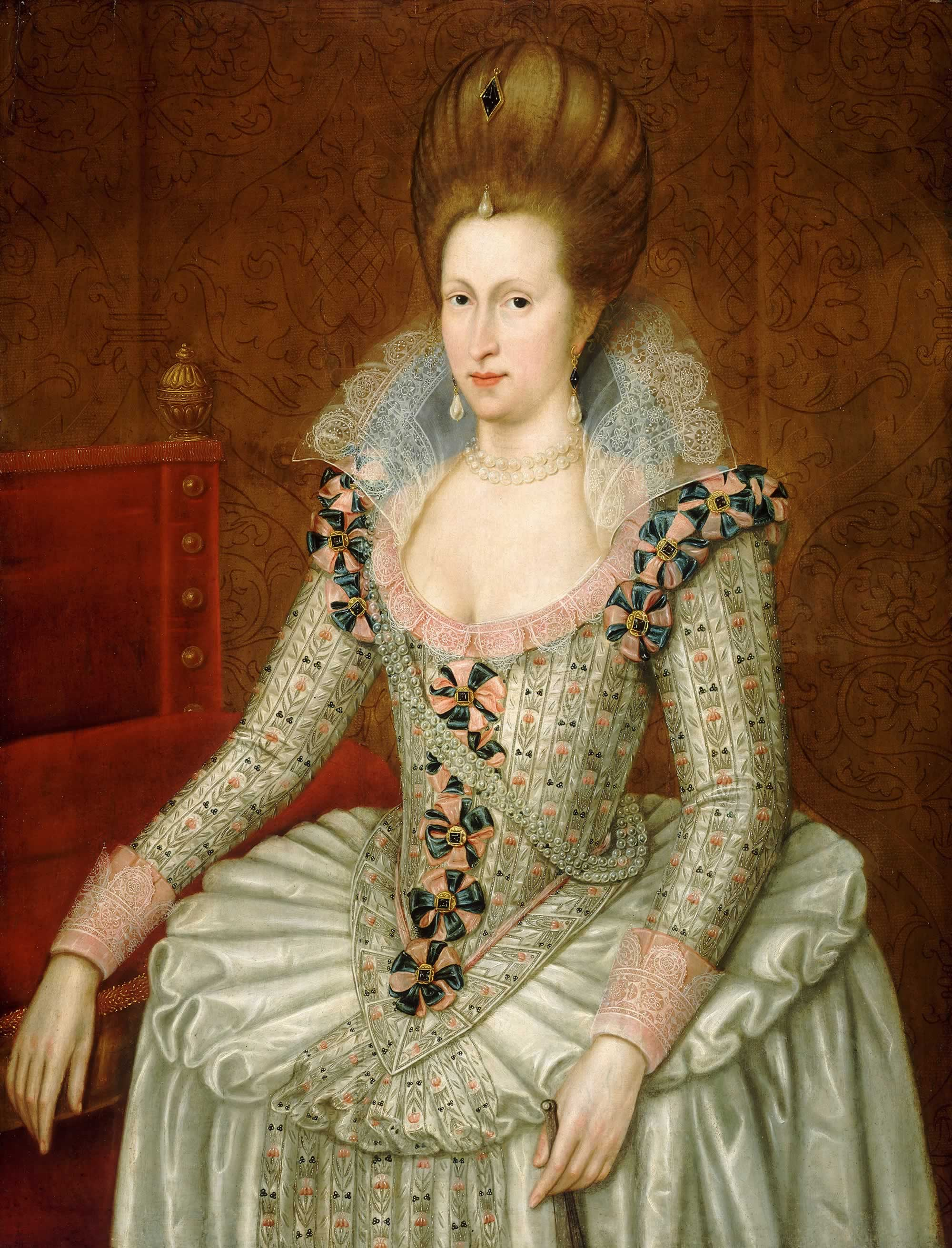
Portrait of Anne by John de Critz, 1605

James married Anne of Denmark in 1589 to establish a strong Protestant alliance in Continental Europe, a policy he continued in 1613 by marrying his daughter to the future King of Bohemia. James was initially said to be infatuated with his wife, and before their meeting he wrote that her portrait had "fascinated our eyes and heart". He gallantly crossed the North Sea with a royal retinue to collect her after Anne's initial efforts to sail to Scotland were thwarted by storms.

Some years passed after the marriage before James and Anne's first child, Prince Henry, was born in 1594. In July 1592, James Halkerston was suspected of writing verses that suggested King James has sex with his favourites and left his wife a virgin. The claimed extra-marital attachment of the King to Anne Murray may have been promulgated to scotch such rumours.

The marriage later cooled and was marked by several marital frictions. Queen Anne was particularly upset with James placing the infant Prince Henry in the custody of John Erskine, Earl of Mar at Stirling Castle, in keeping with Scottish royal tradition. In the course of the marriage, Anne's relationship with her husband alternated between affection and estrangement. The two had eight children, with the last being born during 1607, although some sources cite that by 1606 they had already started living in separate establishments. James lost interest in his wife and it was said that she led a sad, reclusive life afterward, appearing at court functions on occasion. The Venetian ambassador Piero Contarini reported during what would be the last years of Anne's life that "She is unhappy because the king rarely sees her and many years have passed since he saw much of her".

Despite his neglect of Anne, James was affected by her death and was moved to compose a poem in her memory.

=== 'Mistress': Anne Murray ===
There is some evidence of a relationship between James and Anne Murray, later Lady Glamis. The evidence comprises a letter, dated 10 May 1595, to Lord Burghley, in which Sir John Carey wrote of a "fair mistress Anne Murray, the king's mistress", and a poem composed by James entitled A Dream on his Mistress my Ladie Glammes, which is thought to be about Murray, in which James calls Glamis "my mistress and my love".

Anne was the daughter of John Murray, 1st Earl of Tullibardine, master of the king's household. Pauline Croft dates a romantic relationship between the king and Murray between 1593 and 1595.

Based on the "sparse though tantilising evidence", some historians, like Coleman and Matusiak, find it "difficult to avoid the impression" that James had "at least one extra-marital excursion with a member of the opposite sex". For Allan F. Westcott, the paucity of evidence reflects that the relationship was a simply a "conventional, half literary, flirtation". Another possibility is that the king's mistress was "an exercise in political spin" to deflect rumours that James was a "buggerer": Murray arrived at around the same time rumours were circulating that the king had not conceived a child with his wife because he was attracted to men rather than to women.

== Male favourites ==
... his persistent, foolhardy habit of falling head over heels for beautiful, arrogant, and reckless favourites ...

— Huw Lemmey and Ben Miller, "James VI and I", Bad Gays: A Homosexual History (2022)

James had a number of favourites throughout his life, including Esmé Stewart, Philip Herbert, James Hay, Richard Preston, James Stewart, Alexander Lindsay, Francis Stewart, George Gordon, Robert Carr, and George Villiers. Alexander Lindsay was described in 1588 as "the King's minion and only conceit" and his "nightly bedfellow".

=== Esmé Stewart, 1st Duke of Lennox ===
At the age of 13, James made his formal entry into Edinburgh. Upon arriving he met his first cousin, the Franco-Scottish lord Esmé Stewart, about 24 years older than James, whom the Puritan leader Sir James Melville described as "of nature, upright, just, and gentle". Having arrived from France, Stewart was an exotic visitor who fascinated the young James. and they became extremely close. According to the Scottish author David Moysie, by February 1580, "his majesty, having conceived an inward affection to the said Lord Aubigny, entered into great familiarity and quiet purposes with him", and the Scottish historian Robert Johnston used a similar phrase, that James had "conceived an entire love to d'Aubigny" resulting in "great familiarity with him". An English observer, Henry Woddrington, wrote in May 1582 that James "can hardly suffer him out of his presence, and is in such love with him, as in open sight of the people, oftentimes he will clasp him about the neck with his arms and kiss him". John Hacket, James's chaplain in England, wrote that "from the time he [James] was fourteen years old and no more, that is, when the Lord Aubigny [Esmé Stewart] came into Scotland out of France to visit him, even then he began [...] to clasp some one Gratioso in the Embraces of his great Love",

The King first made Aubigny a gentleman of the bedchamber. Later, he appointed him to the Privy Council and created him earl and finally duke of Lennox. Lennox was potentially able to interest James in the Catholic religion and effect cultural change at court, controlling access to the king's bedchamber. Under the influence of Lennox, James acquired a new wardrobe, learnt to dance, and practiced French-inspired courtly riding exercises. In Presbyterian Scotland the thought of a Catholic duke irked many, and Lennox had to make a choice between his Catholic faith or his loyalty to James. In the end, Lennox chose James and the king taught him the doctrines of Calvinism. The Scottish Kirk remained suspicious of Lennox after his public conversion and took alarm when he had the Earl of Morton tried and beheaded on charges of treason. The Scottish ministry was also warned that the duke sought to "draw the King to carnal lust".

In response, the Scottish nobles plotted to oust Lennox. They did so by luring James to Ruthven Castle as a guest, but then kept him as prisoner for ten months; the Lord Enterprisers then forced him to banish Lennox. The duke journeyed back to France and kept a secret correspondence with James. Lennox, in these letters, says he gave up his family "to dedicate myself entirely to you"; he prayed to die for James to prove "the faithfulness which is engraved within my heart, which will last forever." The former duke wrote, "Whatever might happen to me, I shall always be your faithful servant... you are alone in this world whom my heart is resolved to serve. And would to God that my breast might be split open so that it might be seen what is engraven therein."

James was devastated by the loss of Lennox. He sent a servant to France with a gold button from his doublet as a gift for Lennox, which he had worn next to his heart. Lennox had met a frosty reception in France as an apostate Catholic. The Scottish nobles had thought that they would be proven right in their convictions that Lennox's conversion was artificial when he returned to France. Instead, the former duke remained Presbyterian and died shortly after. It was said that William Schaw brought Lennox's heart to Scotland. James had repeatedly vouched for Lennox's religious sincerity and memorialized him in a poem called Ane Tragedie of the Phoenix, which likened him to an exotic bird of unique beauty killed by envy.

=== Richard Preston, 1st Earl of Desmond ===
Richard was born the third son of Richard Preston of Whitehill in Midlothian, near Edinburgh. His family was gentry of the Edinburgh area and owned Craigmillar Castle in the late 16th and early 17th century. His family placed him as a page at the King's court in Edinburgh where he is mentioned in that capacity in 1591. He was a companion of the King since childhood.

As a page, Preston gained the king's special favour in the 1580s or 1590s, after Lennox's departure. When James acceded the English throne as James I in 1603, Preston accompanied him to England and was knighted at the King's coronation in London on 25 July 1603 in the old elaborate ceremony that included the bathing of the new knight. In this way, he was a Knight of the Carpet, awarded the honour as part of a holiday occasion rather than acquiring it through battle. He then was made a groom of the privy chamber. In 1607, Preston was appointed constable of Dingwall Castle in Scotland. He bought the barony of Dingwall and on 8 June 1609 the King created him Lord Dingwall. Preston's closeness to the King, and the King's lavishing of honours upon him, created gossip about their relationship. An emblem produced by engraver Henry Peacham may secretly ridicule Preston for the way in which he gained his honours through the King's favour, rather than personal achievement, and insinuate about his involvement in the "debauchery, effeminacy, and same-sex desire" thought to be in James's court.

In London, the King met in 1608 Robert Carr (see below), who became his favourite and seems to have supplanted Lord Dingwall - although Dingwall could also have been instrumental in arranging Carr's relationship with the King, and Dingwall stayed in good favour with the King throughout the King's life. Dingwall also helped another of James's favourites, George Villiers, rise to prominence.

=== Robert Carr, 1st Earl of Somerset ===
A few years later after the controversy over his relationship with Lennox faded away, James began a relationship with Robert Carr. In 1607, at a royal jousting contest, the 20-year-old Carr, the son of Sir Thomas Carr or Kerr of Ferniehirst, was knocked from a horse and broke his leg. According to Thomas Howard, 1st Earl of Suffolk, James fell in love with the young man and, as the years progressed, showered Carr with gifts. James was 20 years older than Carr. Carr was made a gentleman of the bedchamber and he was noted for his handsome appearance as well as his limited intelligence; he was also made a Knight of the Garter, a Privy Counsellor and Viscount Rochester. It was noted in June 1612 that Robert Carr did not please Anne of Denmark and Prince Henry, who were "not well satisfied with him".

Carr's downfall came through Frances Howard, a beautiful young married woman. Upon Rochester's request, James stacked a court of bishops that would allow her to divorce her husband in order to marry Rochester. As a wedding present, Rochester was created Earl of Somerset. A Christmas season of celebrations included The Somerset Masque.

In 1615, James fell out with Somerset. In a letter James complained, among other matters, that Somerset had been "creeping back and withdrawing yourself from lying in my chamber, notwithstanding my many hundred times earnest soliciting you to the contrary" and that he rebuked James "more sharply and bitterly than ever my master Buchanan durst do".

At this point, public scandal erupted when Somerset's new wife was accused of poisoning Sir Thomas Overbury. Though Somerset refused to admit any guilt, his wife confessed, and both were sentenced to death. The King commuted the sentence. Nevertheless, they were imprisoned in the Tower of London for seven years, after which they were pardoned and allowed to retire to a country estate.

=== George Villiers, 1st Duke of Buckingham ===
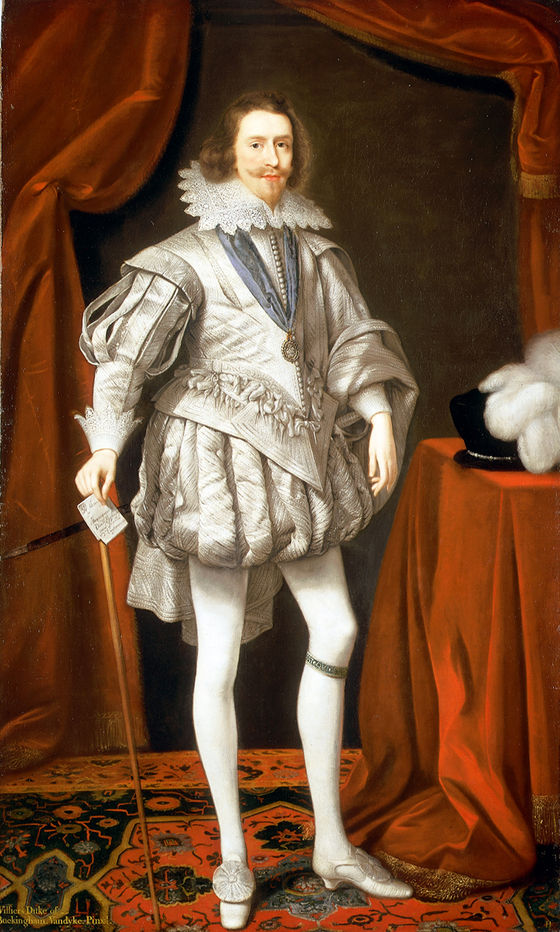
Villiers as Lord High Admiral, a portrait by Daniel Mytens the Elder, 1619

The last of James' favourites was George Villiers, the son of a Leicestershire knight. Villiers was from "minor gentry stock". They had met in 1614, around the same time that the situation with Somerset was deteriorating. Buckingham, 22 years old to James's 48, was described as exceptionally handsome, intelligent and honest. His mother, Mary Villiers sent him to France to train as a courtier. In 1615 James knighted him and 8 years later he was the first commoner for more than a century to be elevated to a dukedom as Duke of Buckingham — although he had first been raised (in sequence) as a Knight of the Garter and Viscount Villiers, as Earl of Buckingham, then as Marquess of Buckingham.

The King was blunt and unashamed in his avowal of love for Buckingham and compared it to Jesus' love of John:

I, James, am neither a god nor an angel, but a man like any other. Therefore I act like a man and confess to loving those dear to me more than other men. You may be sure that I love the Earl of Buckingham more than anyone else, and more than you who are here, assembled. I wish to speak in my own behalf and not to have it thought to be a defect, for Jesus Christ did the same, and therefore I cannot be blamed. Christ had John, and I have George.

The closeness between the two can be seen in letters they wrote each other, which Young, Norton and Bergeron refer to as love letters. James called Buckingham "My only sweet and dear child" to Buckingham's corresponding "dear Dad", which James echoed, calling himself "your dear dad". James's nickname for Buckingham was "Steenie" (a Scottish contraction of Steven), inspired by Saint Stephen, who was said to have the face of an angel and whose portrait showed him to be particularly handsome. Other familiar names the two had for Buckingham were "slave" and "dog" the second of which is likely a playful allusion to James's love for hounds. James also referred to himself and Buckingham as husband and wife. Writing to Buckingham in December 1623 after the death of his (James') wife, James told the duke he was looking forward to their marriage at Christmastime:

My only sweet and dear child,

... I cannot content myself without sending you this present, praying God that I may have a joyful and comfortable meeting with you and that we may make at this Christmas a new marriage ever to be kept hereafter; for, God so love me, as I desire only to live in this world for your sake, and that I had rather live banished in any part of the earth with you than live a sorrowful widow's life without you. And so God bless you, my sweet child and wife, and grant that ye may ever be a comfort to your dear dad and husband.

"For James and Buckingham to be husband and wife implies conjugal love, including sexual passion and expression", Bergernon says, who sees in James's words a description of "a same-sex marriage that James sees as wholly desirable".

Buckingham's letters reciprocated James's affection, declaring in various, "I naturally so love your person, and adore all your other parts, which are more than ever one man had", "I desire only to live in the world for your sake" and "I will live and die a lover of you". While Buckingham was in Spain attempting to arrange the Spanish match, James often wrote to him expressing his longing for his return to "the arms of his dear old dad". In one such letter he declared, "I care for match nor nothing, so I may once have you in my arms again. God grant it! God grant it! God grant it!". Bergeron comments, "The embracing arms can connote emotion and intimacy, parentheses enfolding the beloved". In reply, Buckingham expressed his eagerness to return home to James: "I cannot now think of giving thanks for friend, wife, or child; my thoughts are only bent on having my dear Dad and Master's legs soon in my arms". In an earlier letters he had described himself as a man who "threatens you, that when he once gets hold of your bedpost again, never to quit it". Commenting on Buckingham's words, Young says they are "highly suggestive", and, Bergeron, that "the pen writes of desire ... [he] could have opted for a less explicit statement. But he reinforces desire by naming the body of the beloved. ... The body conveys what the heart desires; so does the body of the letter". In a letter from earlier in the visit to Spain, Buckingham wrote of James's "well shaped legs", with Buckingham making the "point of referring to James's body in a way that he could easily have avoided".

In an undated letter to James, Buckingham wrote, "I entertained myself, your unworthy servant, with this dispute, whether you loved me now ... better than at the time which I shall never forget at Farnham, where the bed's head could not be found between the master and his dog" - about which Young comments, "they had more than sleeping in mind", and Bergernon that Farnham Castle was "presumably the site of the initial sexual encounter between James and Buckingham".

17th century commentators, such as poet Théophile de Viau, wrote plainly about the king's relationship. In his poem Au marquis du Boukinquan, de Viau wrote: "Apollo with his songs / debauched young Hyacinthus, [...] And it is well known that the king of England / fucks the Duke of Buckingham."

During renovations of Apethorpe Hall in the 21st century, workers discovered a passageway linking the bedchambers of James and Villiers. The discovery of the secret passage, according to Dabiri, provides an "intriguing clue to the nature of the affair" between the King and Duke. Coleman regards the passage, dated to 1622-24, as evidence that physical intimacy between the pair may have lasted into the last years of James's life.

Buckingham became good friends with James's wife Anne of Denmark; she addressed him in affectionate letters begging him to be "always true" to her husband. When James I died in March 1625, Buckingham was in France on a diplomatic mission but news of his death brought him to tears.

Aware that James's favouritism might harm him once the crown passed to James' son, Charles, and that Charles would eventually be the one to dispense royal favour, Buckingham ingratiated himself with the prince and became his closest friend and counsellor. His image and persona changed following Charles's ascension to the throne, from an effeminate one that pleased James to a more masculine image of "machismo and strength". In Hunneyball's assessment, winning over Charles and transforming himself was Buckingham's route to stability, away from the power imbalances inherent in a relationship with a king who had made—and could unmake—him.

== See also ==
- Sexuality of Frederick the Great (Frederick and his gay brother Henry were great-great-grandsons of James VI and I; his grandson Ernest Augustus, Duke of York and Albany, was also known to be gay).
