= David Cunningham =

David Cunningham may refer to:

- David Cunningham (bishop) (c. 1540–1600), bishop of Aberdeen
- David Cunningham Snr (born 1943), Scottish accordionist, teacher, composer and band leader
- David Cunningham (American football), American football coach
- David Cunningham (ice hockey) (1928–2020), Australian ice hockey player
- David Cunningham (musician) (born 1954), Irish musician and artist
- David Cunningham (politician) (born 1936), Australian politician
- David Cunningham (sociologist), American sociologist, scholar, and professor
- David Cunningham (sport shooter) (born 1962), Australian sport shooter
- David Douglas Cunningham (1843–1914), Scottish doctor
- David Frederick Cunningham (1900–1979), American prelate of the Roman Catholic Church
- David L. Cunningham (born 1971), American film director and producer
- David S. Cunningham Jr. (1935–2017), American politician and Los Angeles City Council member
- David S. Cunningham III, lawyer and public servant in Los Angeles
- Sir David Cunningham of Robertland, Scottish courtier and architect
- Sir David Cunningham of Auchenharvie (died 1659), Scottish courtier and architect
- Sir David Cunningham, 1st Baronet, of Robertland, Scottish landowner

== See also ==
- David Cuningham (born 1997), Australian rules footballer for Carlton
