= David Cunningham of Auchenharvie =

Scottish courtier and landowner (died 1659)

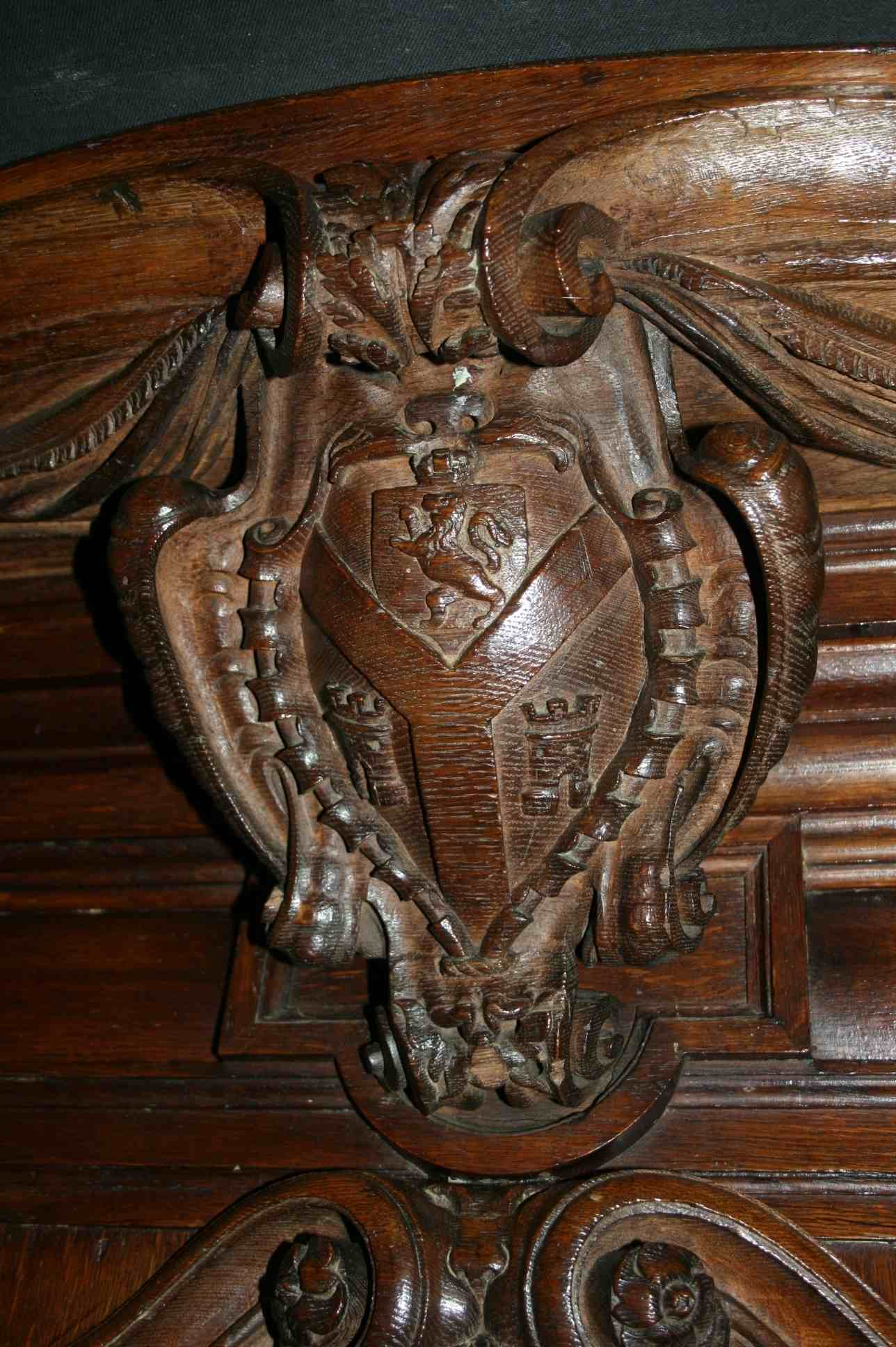
Arms of Sir David Cunningham at St Lukes, Charlton

David Cunningham of Auchenharvie (died 1659) was a Scottish courtier and landowner. An absentee owner of Auchenharvie Castle, in London he was an administrator of income to Charles I of England, as "Receiver of the rents the king had as Prince Charles". A large number of his letters are preserved in the National Records of Scotland. One letter describes with enthusiasm the formation of a secret brotherhood of courtiers, comprising the Scottish "cubicular" or bedchamber servants.

== Career ==
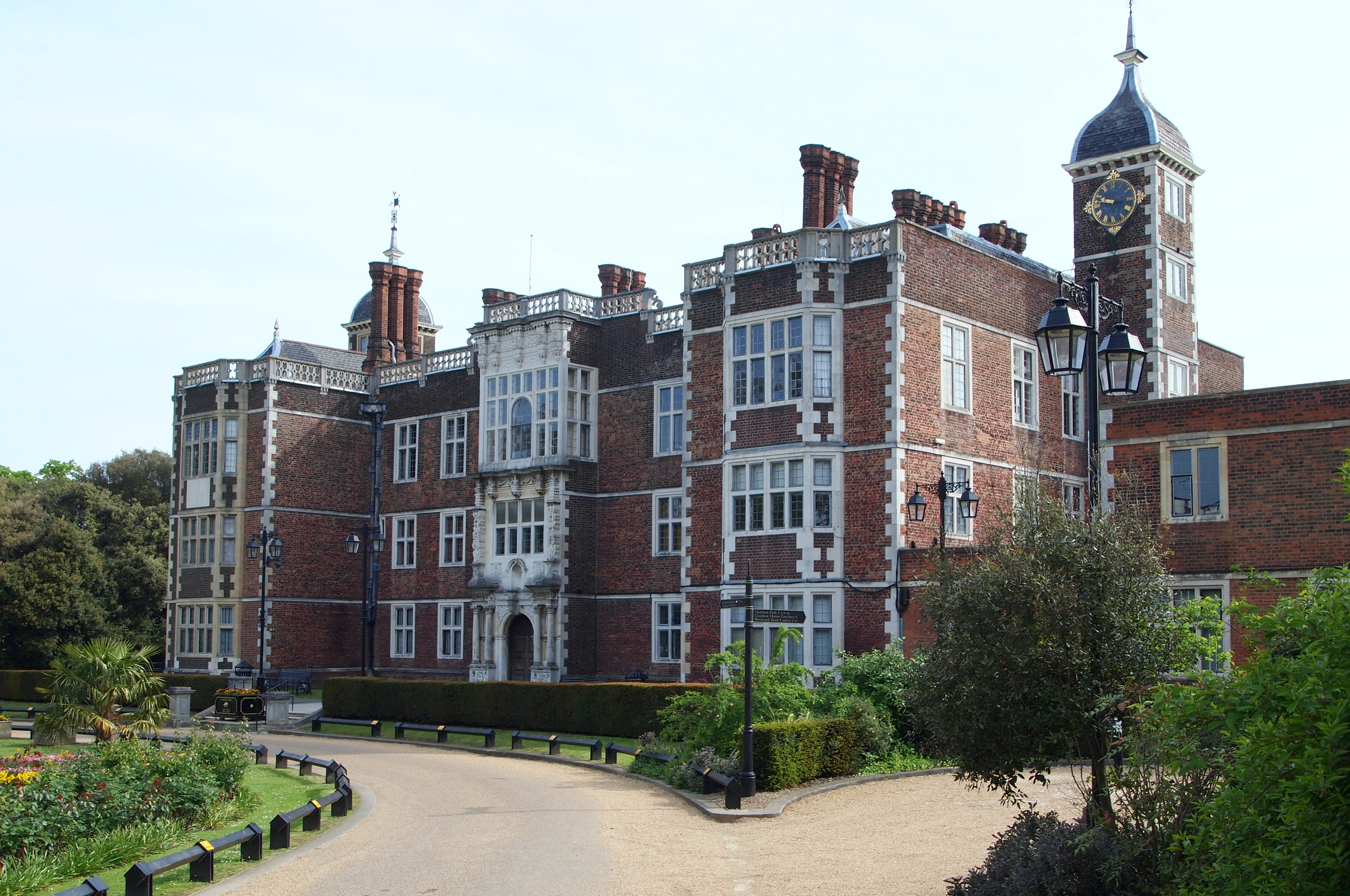
Cunningham was a member of a circle of Scottish courtiers centered at Charlton House

Cunningham was a member of the circle of Sir Adam Newton, who lived at Charlton House close to Greenwich Palace. Newton, a fellow Scot, had been the tutor of Henry Frederick, Prince of Wales. After Prince Henry's death in 1612, Newton and Cunningham continued to be administrators and collectors for the Welsh and Duchy incomes which funded Prince Charles' household. This continued as a separate income stream when he became king. In 1618 Cunningham paid the wages of the court musicians Alfonso Ferrabosco and Thomas Lupo.

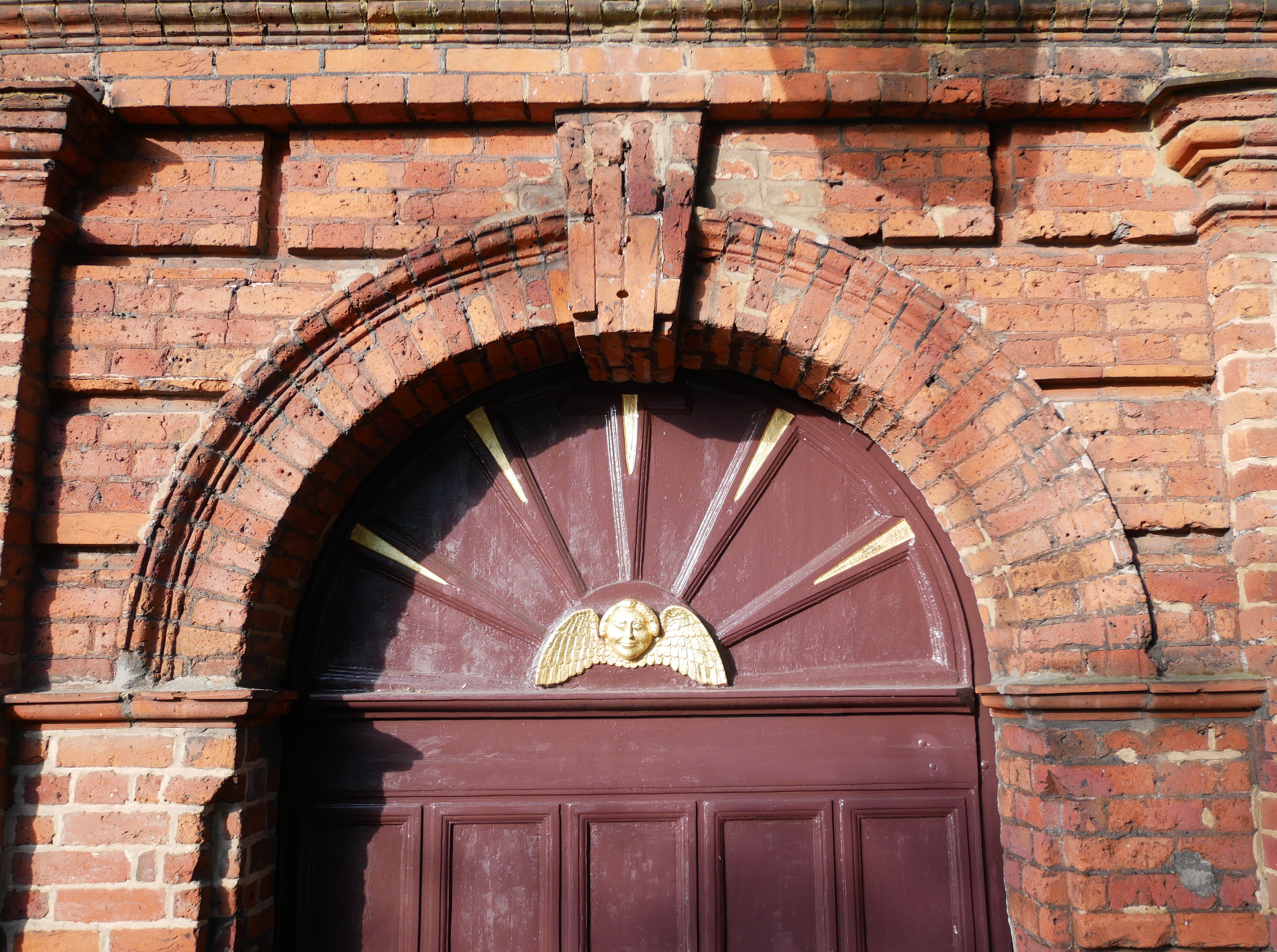
The executors of Adam Newton were entrusted to build St Luke's Church, Charlton

Cunningham wrote letters to his cousin in Scotland, David Cunningham of Robertland, who was grandson of a former royal master of work David Cunningham of Robertland. The letters advise his younger cousin on aspects of their estate business and interests. He also discusses taking Newton's son Sir Henry Newton on an educational trip to France. On the death of Adam Newton in 1629 Cunningham and Peter Newton were charged as his executors to rebuild St Luke's Church at Charlton. The Cunningham arms can still be seen carved on the pulpit.

Cunningham continued to administer revenue from Wales and duchy lands for Charles I as king: in 1633 he paid Thomas Howard, 1st Earl of Berkshire £100 for keeping horses for Charles. Some of his accounts of this income survive in the National Archives and at Ayrshire Archives. They include payments for the lodgings of the painter Daniël Mijtens and the armourer Arnold Rotsipen, wages to king's barber Thomas Caldwell, minor improvements in the park at Ampthill, and old wardrobe debts from the funeral of King James.

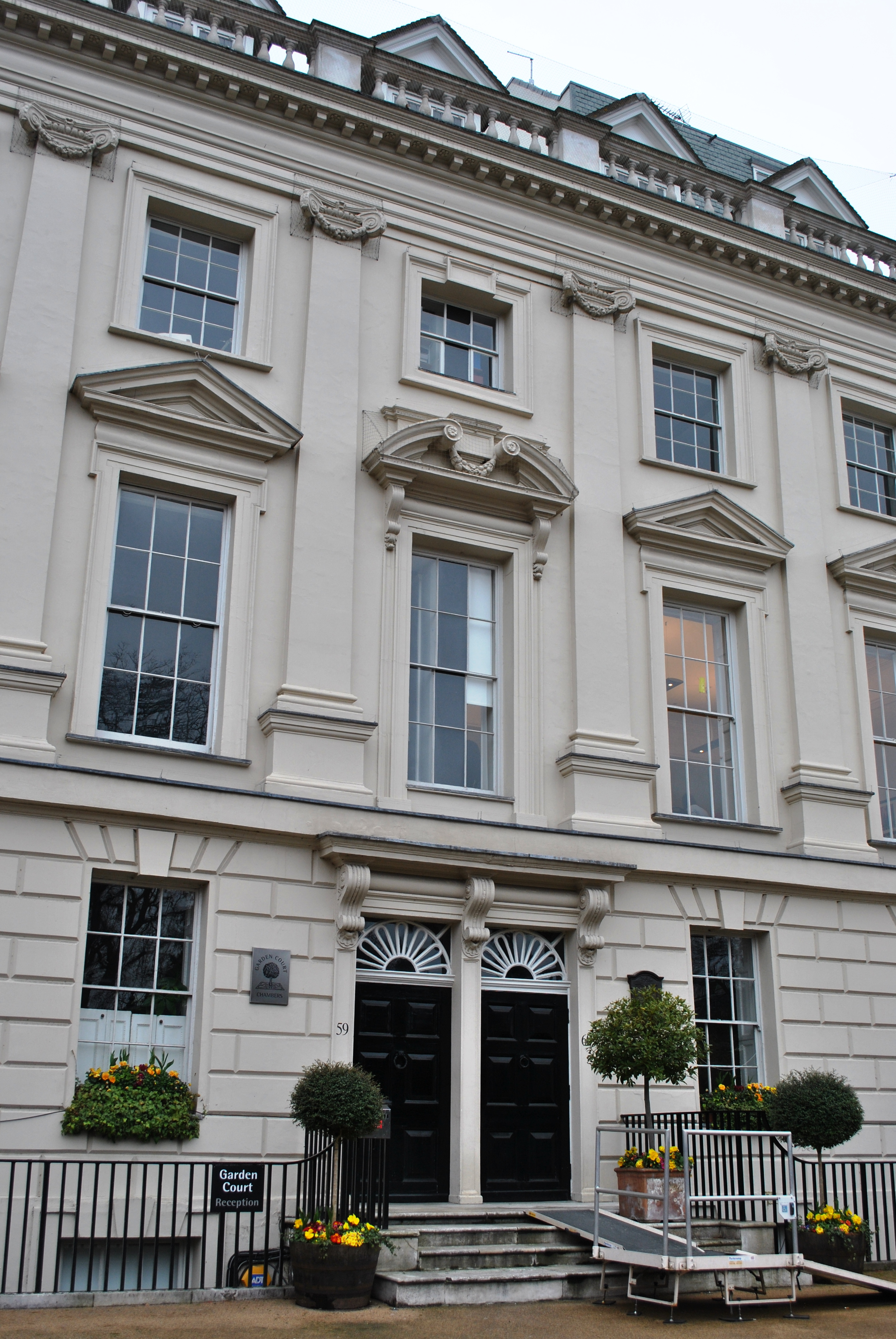
Lindsey House, 59–60 Lincoln's Inn Fields.

Nicholas Stone, the master mason who worked with Inigo Jones, recorded David Cunningham to be his "great good friend" and "very noble friend" when he paid for the monument of Sir Thomas Puckering, for Adam Newton's brother-in-law, at St. Mary's Warwick and for Adam Newton's own tomb at St. Luke's Charlton. Cunningham was involved in the business affairs of Newton's daughters, Jane Enyon and Elizabeth Peyto, whose husband Edward Peyto built at Chesterton, Warwickshire.

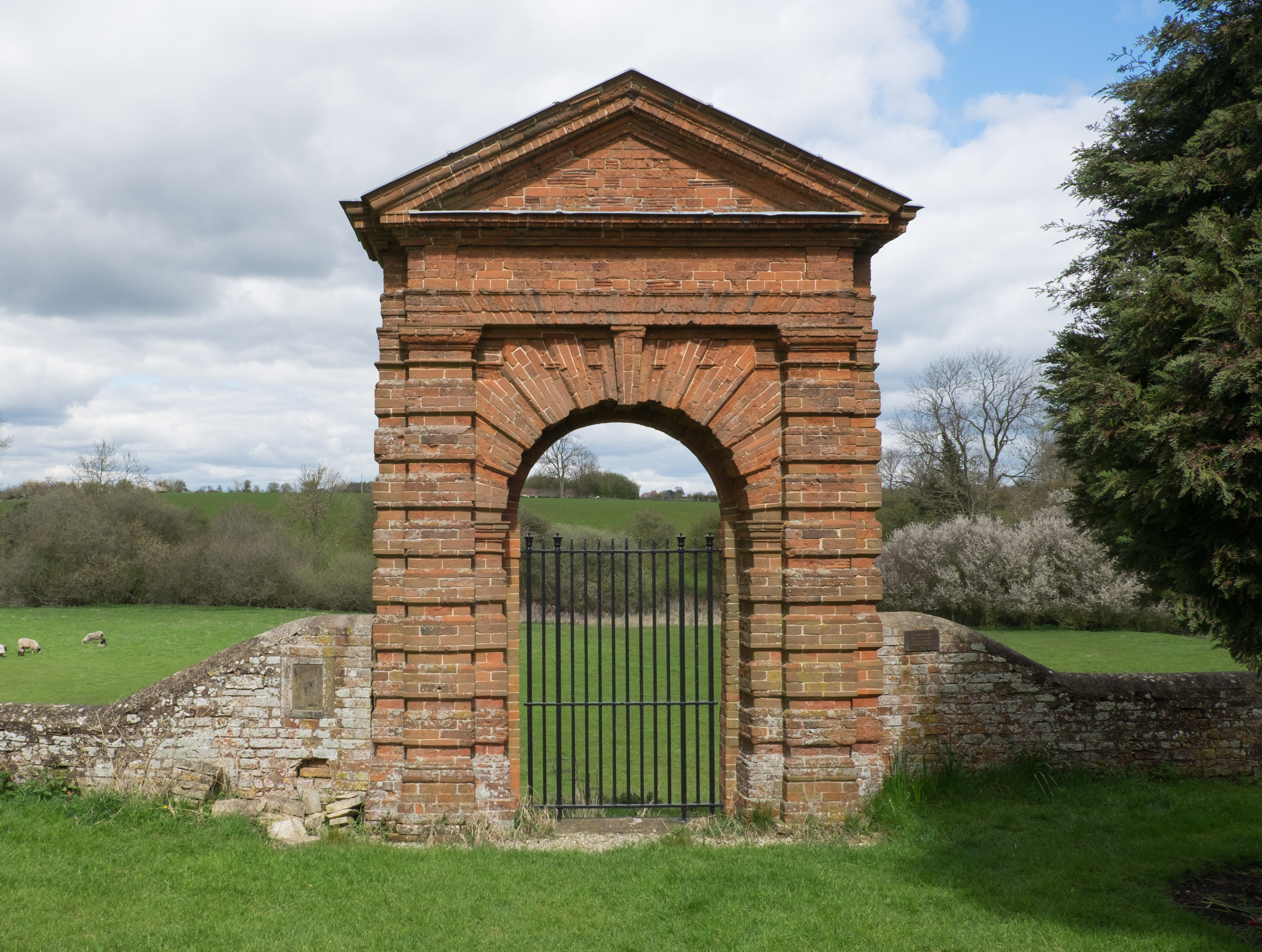
Edward Peyto's gateway at Chesterton

In June 1629 he hurt himself badly playing football. Around the same time he received a royal command for him to supervise building work at Berkhamsted Place. His account for this work survives, counter-signed by Thomas Trevor, surveyor of works at Windsor Castle, and is now held by the Folger Shakespeare Library. The improvements at Berkhamsted were for the convenience of Jane Murray, the widow of Secretary Murray, and her young family which included Anne, Lady Halkett and Elizabeth Murray who married Adam Newton's heir, Sir Henry Newton.

Cunningham bought clothes in London for his cousin Sir David Cunningham of Robertland to wear in Edinburgh during the coronation visit of King Charles in 1633. The designs followed the colours and styles of clothes made by the king's tailor Patrick Black. On 1 May 1633, Cunningham advised:

"Sir, you needed not in your letter to instruct me to be lavish of your purse for I am apt enough to transgress that way, yet I will put you to as little charge as I can: but your honour and reputation being engaged at such an extraordinary time as this, (the like whereof I hope shall not be seen in my days) we must not stand too much on saving."

Several warrants authorizing Sir David to pay accounts for the education of the royal children survive. Cunningham was directly involved in the education of Scottish aristocrats, including Hugh Montogmerie, the future Earl of Eglinton, and his brothers who came to him and Sir John Seton to see London in November 1634 after a sojourn in Paris. In November 1635 he hoped to help Henry Montgomerie be made a gentleman of Prince's bedchamber.

Cunningham urged his cousin to marry Elizabeth Heriot, the daughter of the cloth merchant and royal financier Robert Jousie and widow of a goldsmith James Heriot. He wrote in 1635 that "she is yet a widow but not like to continue, being much importuned with sundry suitors of quality".

Cunningham came with the court to Oxford in 1636 and described a masque in another letter to his cousin, the spectacle represented (if his description can be trusted) the reconciliation of Catholic and Protestant interests in the form of baked pies:

an invention of pyes walking, the one half representing English Bishops, with my lord's grace of Canterbury conducting them, th'other half foreign Cardinalls, with the Pope leading them, and both came to the King at table, one on his right hand and t'other on his left and both were received and made friends.

Cunningham seems to have been involved in the building of a house in Lincoln's Inn Fields now called "Lindsey House", which he sold to Henry Murray (d. 1672), a son of Secretary Murray and a groom of the king's bedchamber, in 1641. The house was completed between 1639 and 1641, and has been associated with Inigo Jones and Nicolas Stone. The building with its brick pilasters stuccoed to look like stone fits the ideal of 17th-century building regulations in the city.

In 1639, as receiver, he paid the wages of servants in the households of the royal children, and in 1641 paid for books bought for the Prince and Duke of York from the stationer Henry Seile.

In 1639 Robert Johnstone LLD, a friend of George Heriot who had been Robert Jousie's executor, made David Cunningham the overseer of his will and bequeathed him an Arabian gold coin. The executors were two London-based merchants John Jousie and Robert Inglis. Cunningham and the other supervisor, Lord Johnstone, were to employ £3,000 in good works in Scotland.

A survey of rentals in the Cunninghame district of Ayrshire circa 1640 listed him at £1553, among the largest landowners in the county.

In September 1651, after the Royalist defeat at the battle of Worcester, he was a prisoner in Chester Castle, with the Earl of Derby, the Duke of Lauderdale, and Mr Lane.

== Death ==
Cunningham died in 1659, and was buried at Charlton, in the church that he had helped to restore on 7 February. He made his will on 18 January. Records of a later dispute over his estate, state that he had died a debtor in the King's Bench prison. In his will, Cunningham specified debts owing to him that totalled some £30,000, and declared debts he owed of about £6,000. A creditor obtained administration of his estate in 1665, but this award was set aside by the Prerogative Court of Canterbury in 1695, when Sir James Cunningham, administrator of Sir David Cunningham of Robertland and his son, obtained administration.

Baronetage of Nova Scotia
New creation	Baronet (of Auchinhervie); 1633–1659	Succeeded by Robert Cunningham
