= Thomas Murray (provost of Eton) =

Scottish courtier

Thomas Murray (1564 – 9 April 1623) was a Scottish courtier, at the end of his life Provost of Eton.

== Life ==
He was a son of Murray of Woodend, and uncle of William Murray, 1st Earl of Dysart. He was early attached to the court of James VI of Scotland. In 1587 he presented a Latin poem to the King, which describes him as ruler of a northern British kingdom, both North Star and Morning Star;

Scote Britannaeae sidus Boreale coronae
Pene sub Arctoo qui regis arva polo

O Scot, O North Star of the Britannic Crown, you who rule the lands that lie almost under the Arctic sky.

Soon after James's accession to the English throne at the Union of the Crowns in 1603 he was appointed tutor to Prince Charles, then duke of York. On 26 June 1605 he was granted a pension of two hundred marks for life, and in July was presented, through the intervention of the Bishop of Durham, to the mastership of Christ's Hospital, Sherburn, near Durham. From that time he received numerous grants, and was in constant communication with Robert Cecil, 1st Earl of Salisbury, Sir Albertus Morton, Sir Dudley Carleton, and others, many of his letters being preserved.

Andrew Melville, when he sought his liberty in November 1610, placed the management of his case in the hands of Murray, to whom he refers as his special friend. In 1615 George Gladstanes, Archbishop of St. Andrews, made an unsuccessful attempt to get Murray removed from the tutorship of Prince Charles as for his religious views. On 13 March 1617 Murray was appointed a collector of the reimposed duty on 'northern cloth,' and allowed one-third of the profits. In August of the same year the king promised him the provostship of Eton, but his appointment was opposed on suspicion of his puritanism, and he received the post of secretary to Prince Charles instead.

In October 1621 he was confined to his house for opposing the Spanish match. In February 1622 he was elected provost of Eton, but fell seriously ill in February 1622-3, and died on 9 April, aged 59. He left behind him five sons and two daughters, one the writer Anne Halkett. His widow, Jean, and a son received a pension for their lives. Murray was author of some Latin poems, printed in Delitiae Poetarum Scotorum, ed. 1637. He was eulogised by John Leech in his Epigrammata, ed. 1623, and by Arthur Johnston in his Poemata, ed. 1642.

One of his brothers was at court as a servant of Prince Charles in March 1625. He was involved in a duel with Humfrey Tufton, after having an argument at a stage play. They went to St George's Fields to fight. Tufton noted the presence of Gibson, a Scottish armourer, although they had agreed not to have "seconds" present. Tufton objected and left the field. The events offended Gibson's sense of honour, and he fought with Murray. Both were injured. Gibson died and Murray successfully pleaded self-defence. Some accounts say that both men died of their injuries.

== Family ==
Secretary Murray married Jean "Jane" Drummond, a daughter of George Drummond of Blair and Grissel Cargill, who had joined her cousin Jean Drummond, Countess of Roxburghe at the court of Anne of Denmark. Several women of the Drummond family served the court and their identities can be confused.

The Countess of Roxburghe was later the governess of the children of Charles I of England. Two of her cousins, another Jean Drummond, the eldest daughter of the Earl of Perth and later Countess of Wigtown, and her sister Lilias Drummond, later Countess of Tullibardine, assisted Roxburghe as royal nurse. Another woman "Joan Drummond" was seamstress to Prince Charles in Scotland and England.

Anne Murray, Lady Halkett wrote that her mother was "entrusted twice with the charge and honor of being Governese to the Duke of Glocester and the Princese Elizabeth; the first during the time that the Countese of Roxbery (who owned my mother for her cousin) went and continued in Holland with the Princese Royall; and then again when my Lady Roxbery died".

The children of Secretary Murray and Jean Drummond were brought up at Berkhamsted Place and Charlton House, included:

- Henry Murray, groom of the bedchamber to Charles I, who bought Lindsay House from Sir David Cunningham, and married in November 1635 Anne Bayning, daughter of Paul Bayning, 1st Viscount Bayning.
- Elizabeth Murray, who married Sir Henry Newton, son of Prince Henry's tutor Adam Newton, who adopted the name Sir Henry Puckering
- Anne Murray, Lady Halkett (1622-1699), who married James Halkett at Charlton House in 1656.
