= Edward Peyto =

English landowner (1589–1643)

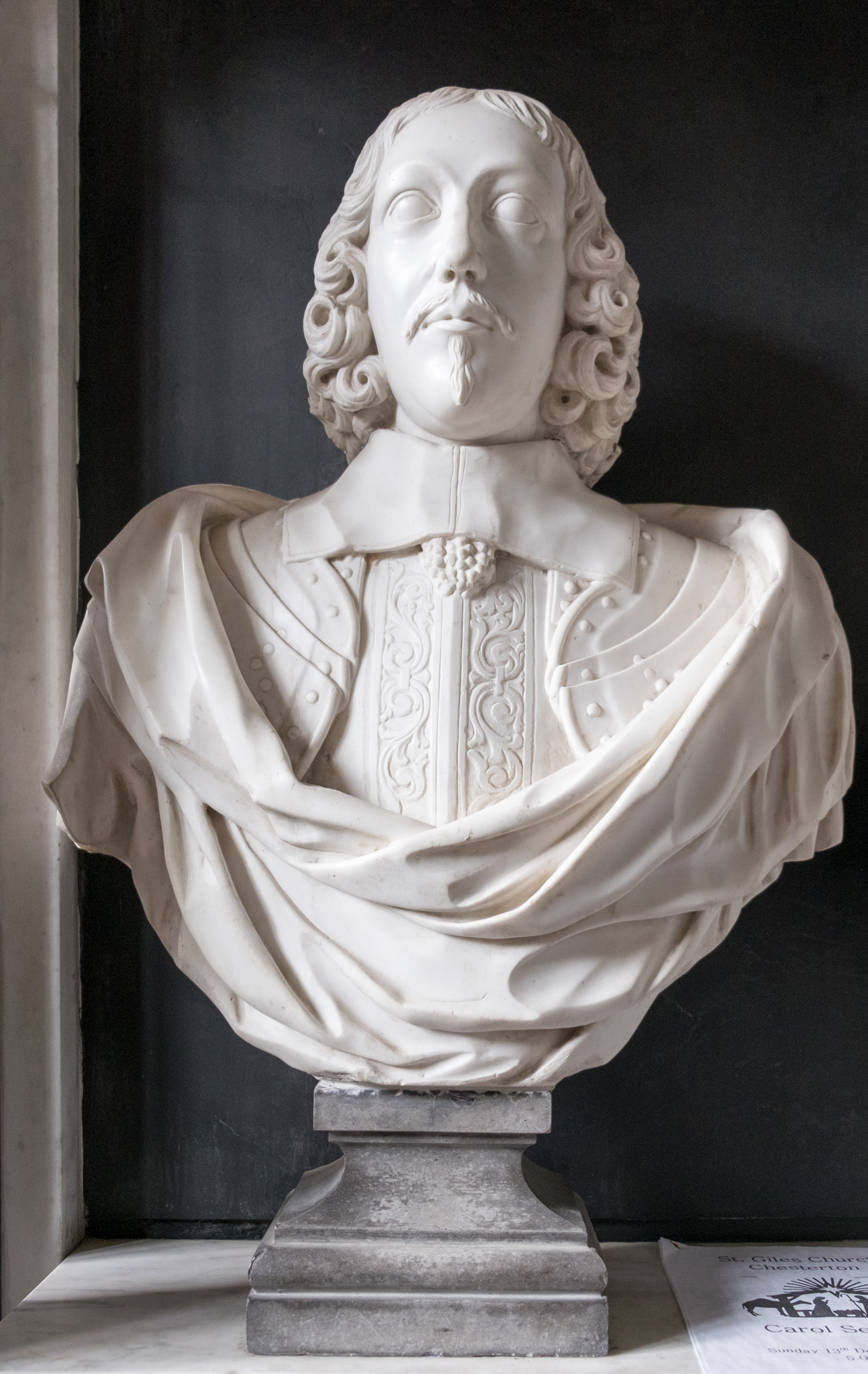
Bust of Edward Peyto from his monument at St. Giles Church, Chesterton

Edward Peyto (1589–1643) was an English landowner.

He was the son of William Peyto (d. 1619) and Elienora or Eleanor Aston (d. 1636), a daughter of Walter Aston of Tixall, and widow of Thomas Boulding.

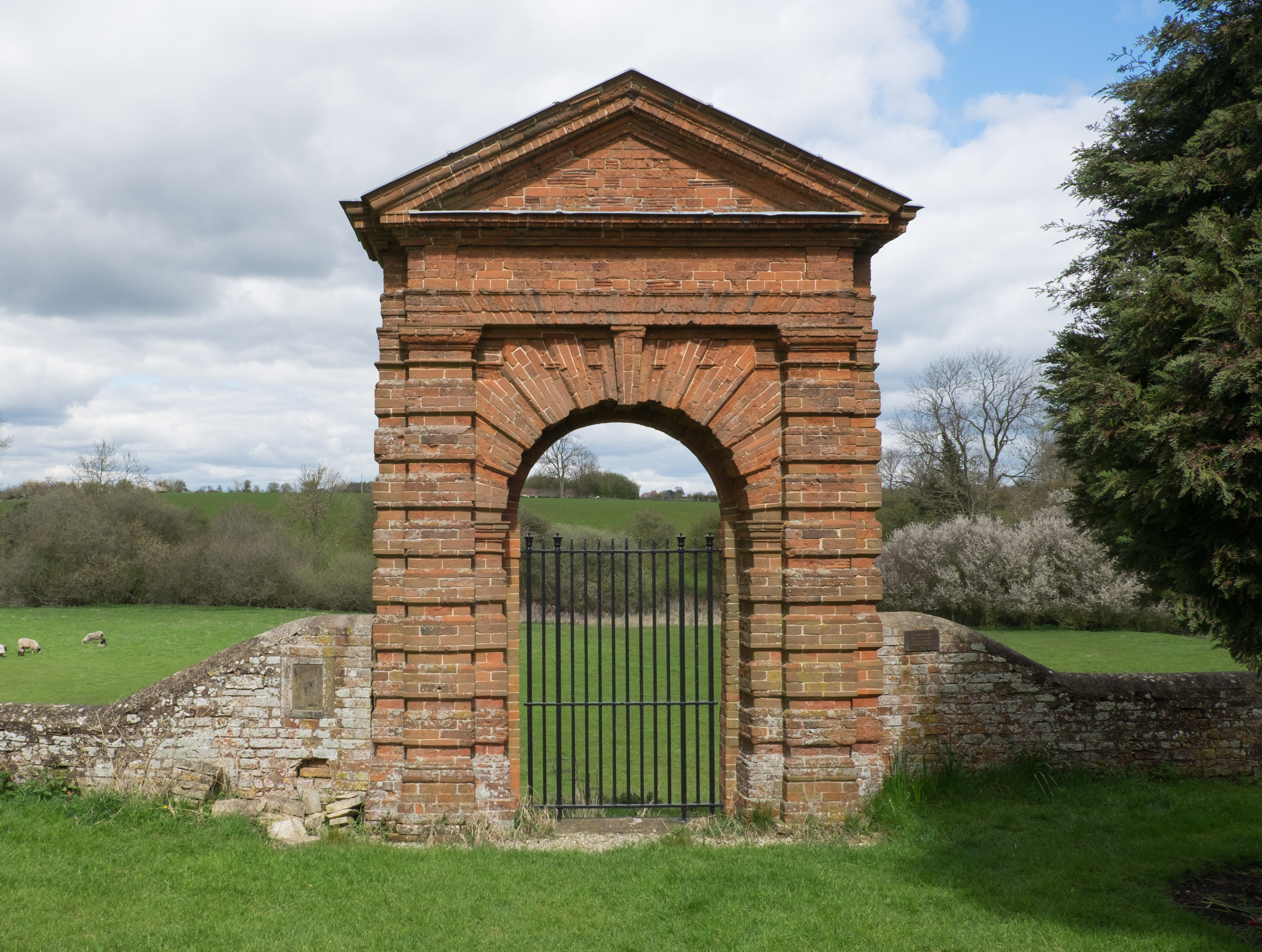
Peyto gateway at Chesterton

His estates were at Chesterton, Warwickshire. He extended Chesterton House in the 1630s (now demolished) and was probably the builder of Chesterton Windmill. A brick gateway built near the church in the 1630s survives. It follows a design by Inigo Jones.

Peyto commissioned Nicholas Stone to make a monument for his parents in 1639. He developed brickmaking and woad growing on his lands.

Peyto was a Parliamentarian and took command of Warwick Castle during the siege of August 1642. He displayed a flag with a device of a Bible and shroud or winding sheet to discourage the besiegers.

He died on 21 September 1643 and was buried at St Giles, Chesterton. His monument is thought to be the work of John Stone, the son of Nicholas Stone. According to the Latin inscription on the tomb, Peyto was a man of letters who excelled at mathematics.

== Marriage and children ==
In 1625 he married Elizabeth Newton, daughter of Adam Newton (d. 1630), former tutor to Prince Henry. The marriage was commemorated with heraldic stained-glass at St Luke's Church, Charlton. Her sister Jane Enyon lived nearby at Bishop's Itchington. Newton's former colleague and executor, the architect David Cunningham of Auchenharvie took an interest in their business affairs. Edward Peyto's children included:

- Edward Peyto (1626–1658), educated at Magdalen College, Oxford. He served as Lieutenant-Colonel of the Earl of Denbigh's Parliamentary regiment of horse in 1644–45, and was commissioned Colonel of a regiment of foot in the Warwickshire Militia in 1650. He served as a member of the Second Protectorate Parliament. His funeral sermon by Thomas Pierce was printed as Empsuchon Nekron. Or the Lifelesness of Life on the Hether Side of Immortality. With (A Timely Caveat Against Procrastination) Briefly Expressed and Applyed in a Sermon Preached at the Funerall of Edward Peyto of Chesterton in Warwick-shire Esquire (R. Royston, 1659).
- William Peyto, who married Elizabeth Verney, daughter of Greville Verney, 7th Baron Willoughby de Broke and Katherine Southwell.
