= Janet Fockart =

Scottish merchant (died 1596)

Janet Fockart (died 1596) was a Scottish merchant and moneylender.

== Life ==
Little is known of her background. In the 15th century there was a Scottish landowning family, Folkert of Folkertoun, and she may have been a relation.

Janet Fockart was married three times, to John Todd, in 1560 to the luxury merchant and magistrate William Fowler (d. 1572), with whom she had seven children, and to James Hathoway (d. 1579), a nephew of the merchant Alexander Park. In early modern Scotland, married women did not usually adopt their husband's surnames.

Already during Fowler's lifetime, she was engaged in business as a moneylender, and after 1580, she rose to become one of the most successful in this line of business in Edinburgh. Among her clients were Robert Stewart, 1st Earl of Orkney, regent James Douglas, 4th Earl of Morton, as well as king James VI of Scotland, who was a regular client. She left a substantial fortune at her death. She was the mother of the poet William Fowler and grandmother of the poet William Drummond of Hawthornden. A daughter Sarah married an Edinburgh merchant John Inglish or Inglis, and their son Robert Inglis settled in London by 1630 and registered a coat of arms.

== Janet Fockart and William Fowler's merchant stock ==
William Fowler senior and Janet Fockart had a shop and warehouse. They sold cloth, trimmings and haberdashery. He died in 1572, and his registered will included his entire stock. There were fine silk damasks for gowns, and woollen "friezes" for cloaks, serge for coats and women's riding clothes. Fourteen thousand counterfeit pearls and "tock" fabric were probably to be used for masque costumes.

William Fowler, the merchant, was also a treasurer of the French revenues and dowry income of Mary, Queen of Scots. An exchequer account for 1564 includes payments from William Fowler, £500 was used for the wages of her guard and £500 for her expenses in Perth.

Ten years after the death of William Fowler the merchant, their son William Fowler (the poet) went to London and visited the French ambassador Michel de Castelnau. He hoped the ambassador would help him get payment for an old debt owed to his father by Mary, Queen of Scots. Fowler described his meetings with the ambassador in letters to Francis Walsingham. He mentioned in May 1583 that his mother, Janet Fockart, despaired of recovering the debt. She had already written for repayment to the French administrators of Mary's dowry, including the Archbishop of Glasgow, Péguillon, and René Dolu, to no avail.

Janet Fokart's customers included Margaret Kennedy, Countess of Orkney, an account of her expenses in 1584 includes debts to Fockart.

== William Fowler's house ==
Janet and her husband had a large house near or on the Royal Mile of Edinburgh, and the site was called Fowler's Close and later, Anchor Close. Janet, as a widow, let parts of this house for rent. In May 1578 a roof-slater William Robesoun was punished outside the house for slandering Eleanor Bowes, the wife of the English ambassador Robert Bowes who was lodged there.

Esmé Stewart lodged in the house in 1579 when he first arrived from France and before his departure in 1583. In September 1584, she hosted a party of German tourists including Lupold von Wedel who went riding with her son, the poet William Fowler. The Earl of Huntly prepared a banquet for the king and others in the house in March 1589.

Robert Bowes was lodged in the house in January 1592, and reported that it was being prepared for James VI and Anne of Denmark, who needed extra security because of the threat posed by the Earl of Bothwell. In September 1593, Bowes' wife Eleanor organised a dinner at the lodging, serving venison in the English manner for the Earl and Countess of Atholl, and they were joined by the Earl and Countess of Bothwell.

In the early 1590s Giacomo Castelvetro, an Italian writer who served James VI as a language tutor and secretary, lodged with them and Eleanor Bowes made friends with his wife, Isotta de Canonici, the widow of Thomas Erastus.

The court of Scottish exchequer met in the house in 1593. Janet and her elder son, the merchant William Fowler, litigated over her management of the building's fabric.

In September 1594, the lairds of Buccleuch and Cessford stayed secretly in the house, to meet with the Master of Glamis.

== Janet Fockart's inventory ==
Janet Fokart died on 17 May 1596. Her children made an inventory of her goods, starting with the gold and silver coins in her purse. In the shop or "merchant booth" there was a piece of "Dornick" linen, a wheel for spinning lint, and a piece of tapestry worth £80, some men's clothes, and 16 old-fashioned hats, with a miscellany of items including three gold crêpes and four "kells" for women to wear in their hair. Her jewelry included several bracelets, a pendant of brooch depicting Noah's Ark, a pair of gold garnishings (front and back) for her hair, chains, rings, tablets, precious stones, and a jewel "efter the signe of ane parokat", depicting a parakeet or parrot.

The debts that were owed to Jonet Fockart were also listed. The first was from the Lord of Lindores, who had collaborated with her son the poet William Fowler to produce the Masque at the baptism of Prince Henry. Lindores owed £600 and had left as a pledge a woman's gown made of cloth of silver and some gold buttons. George Home, later Earl of Dunbar, owed £100. Margaret Livingstone, Countess of Orkney, owed £100 and had pledged a diamond chain with 13 pieces and a diamond ring. Lord Spynie owed £200 and had pledged a "target" or hat badge of gold with 17 diamonds. George Douglas of Parkhead owed £336. Many more people had borrowed money, pledging their jewelry, or lengths of costly fabric, or formally recording their obligations.

== Family ==
Janet Fockart's children included;

- William Tod
- William Fowler, elder (d. 1606), merchant in Edinburgh, who married Catherine Gibson, their children included another William Fowler. His daughter, Sarah Fowler, married John Inglis, and was the mother of the London-based merchant financier Robert Inglis.
- Susannah Fowler, who married John Drummond of Slipperfield and Hawthornden. Their son was the poet William Drummond of Hawthornden.
- Barbara Fowler
- Janet Fowler
- William Fowler, younger, poet and secretary to Anne of Denmark, who had five children
- John Fowler, twin of the poet
