= Castle and Barony of Robertland =

Place in East Ayrshire, Scotland

Coordinates: 55.69178°N 4.48051°W

The coat of arms of the Cunninghames of Robertland.

The Castle and Barony of Robertland (NS 4428 4693) is located near Stewarton, off the B769 road, in the old district of Cunninghame, Parish of Stewarton, and now part of East Ayrshire, Scotland.

== History ==
=== Robertland castle and barony ===
Robertland Castle, in the barony of that name, was held by a cadet branch of the Cunninghames and is now a ruin with a few stone features visible. Timothy Pont records the name as 'Over Robertland' in the 17th century and states that the castle is entirely removed. In 1800 the remaining stones from this tower were used to build the walls of the walled garden at Robertland House, across the Swinzie Burn. This feature still exists (2009).

A Marriage stone above the door to the walled Gardens. Circa 1930.

A view of the Swinzie Burn on its course through the Estate. Circa 1930.

The old castle had been a massive square structure six storeys high. Cattle and horses were accommodated on the ground floor, the servants on the second, and the family occupied the upper storeys. This defensive keep was surrounded by a moat which could be easily flooded by the nearby Swinsey Burn.

The Montgomeries are believed to have burnt the castle down following the murder of the 4th Earl of Eglinton at Stewarton in 1586.

In 1962 the RCAHMS visited and recorded that the castle and its courtyard remnants stood on the steep, natural, South bank of the Swinzie Burn, with steep slopes on all sides. The whole length of the retaining South wall was discernible, about 1.6m wide. The castle interior was thought to be divided into two compartments by an earth-and-stone bank 3.0m wide and 0.7m high. A low bank to the west, 2.0m wide and 0.3m high, may have been the course of the West wall of the castle. The retaining East wall of the courtyard was entire and stood approximately 0.5m in height and 1.6m thick. Ditches on the South and West sides of the castle were considered to be natural.

Many carved stones have been recovered from the moat and are preserved in the wall surrounding the garden. These stones include a Gargoyle, a rounded projectile of sandstone, and also a stone with a mason's mark. The garden wall has a stone with the date 1597 and the Latin sentence, Vita post fine eraverit (There will be life after the end).

In the gable of the home farm are the letters D.M.C. and apparently the date 1018. A dovecot was a feature of the mansion house outbuildings. The estate had been enclosed with hedges and ditches in about 1764.

In 1607 Over, Nether Castleton and Fulshaw were part of the estate of Robertland, being held by David Cunninghame, his son Sir David, and in 1628 his son, also David Cunninghame. Over Lochrig (sic) near Stewarton was at one time a part of the estate. In 1628 Waterland in the Parish of Dunlop was part of the estate.

In 1770 the lands and Barony were sold, including the Superiority of Halket, Hazelbank and Water-Land.

=== Robertland house and estate ===
Alexander Kerr, a Stewartonian tobacco entrepreneur, purchased Robertland in around 1813, built the present house in 1820 and after his death his son John James inherited and leased Robertland to a series of tenants.

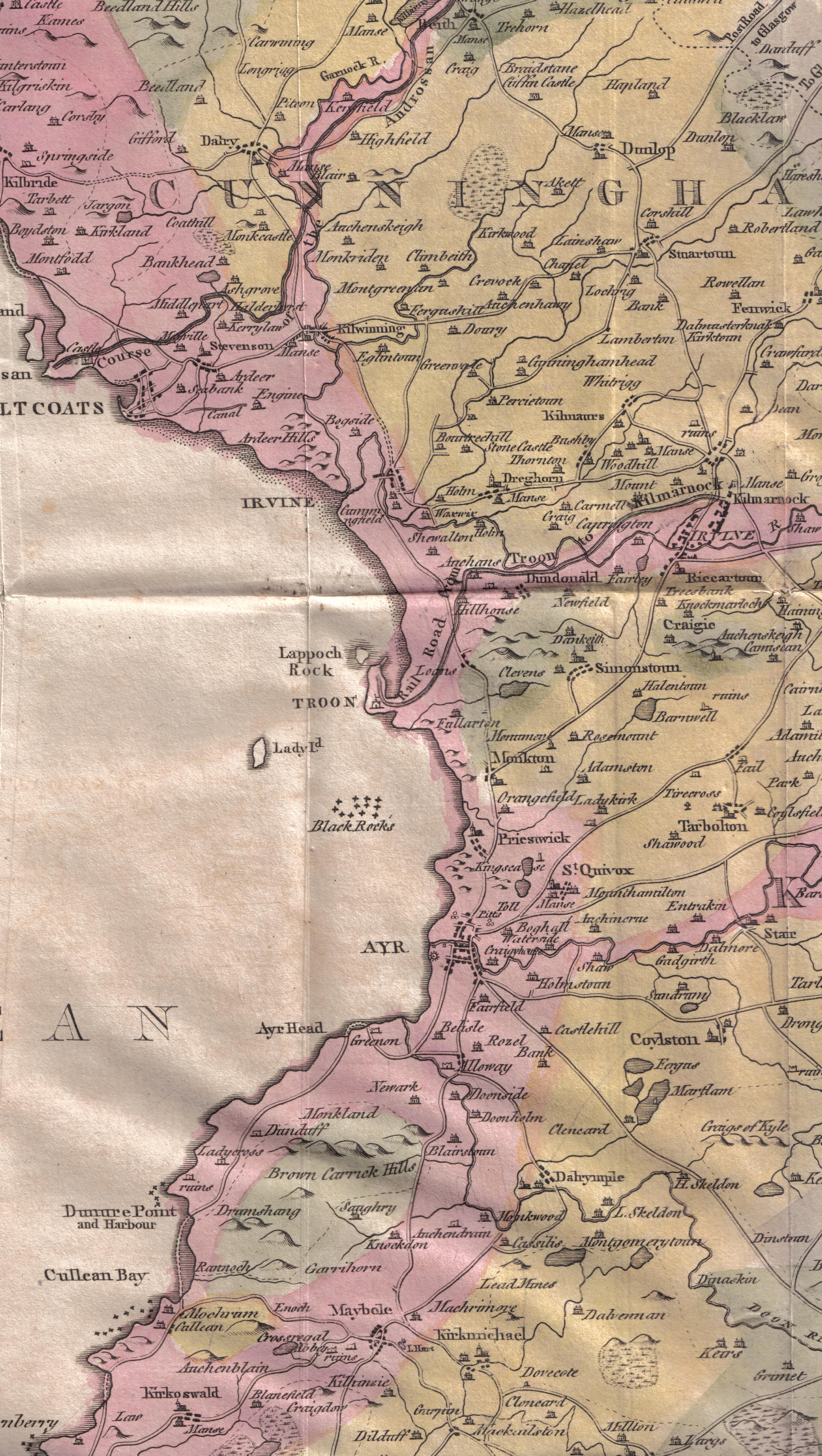
William Aiton's 1811 map showing Robertland.

A view of Robertland Mansionhouse. Circa 1930.

Robertson records that in 1823 "the remarkably lofty house of six stories has lately been demolished". Sir William Cunninghame of Fairlie is at this time designated as of 'Fairlie and Robertland'.

Pigot gives Alexander Kerr Esq. or Moorpark, merchant in Glasgow, as resident at Robertland in 1837, having purchased Robertland and Haysmuir Farm in around 1813. A native of Stewarton, Kerr had spent some years in America, and he was one of the wealthy and influential 'Tobacco Lords.' He was married to Diana Barr (born 31 January 1786 & died 9 June 1868, aged 65) and he lived from 22 March 1775 to 5 May 1847, dying at the age of 73 and buried at the Laigh Kirk in Stewarton.

The dates and descriptions suggest that the 'lofty house of six storeys' was built on the north side of the Swinzie Burn after the old castle on the south side was demolished, and it was in turn demolished when the present house of circa 1820 was built.

The present-day Robertland House (2009) was designed in 1820 by David Hamilton, who also designed Dunlop House. Hamilton's acted as architect to the estate owner, Alexander Kerr. It has a pediment, pilaster terminated windows in an otherwise standard facade.

Alexander Kerr was succeeded by his son, Mr John James Kerr, in 1847. Others to occupy the house after him were: Mr John Mcintyre, iron merchant of Glasgow; Mr Thomas Mcintyre MP of Sorn Castle; Mr Wallace Fairweather JP, DL of Mearns Castle and Mr Service of Glasgow. They were tenants of the house until Mr George Muir, JP of Howard Street, Kilmarnock purchased the estate from the Trustees of Mr J.J. Kerr after the mansion had been damaged by fire in 1914. It was totally renovated, and modernised, resulting in the house as it is today.

The estate was put up for sale in 1913, consisting of 2,243 acres (9.08 km^{2}), with 71 acres (290,000 m^{2}) as woodland and 168 acres (0.68 km^{2}) as moss, 26 farms were present, and shooting rights were held for Glenouther Moor. Nether Robertland, Fulshaw, Clonherb, Broadmoss, Cauldhame, Braehead, Hairshaw, Lintbrae, Overhill, Burnfoot, Pokelly (East & West), Clunch (High & Low), Derclabboch and others were part of the Robertland Estate at the time of the sale.

One of the better known occupants of the house was Dr John Cunningham, who enjoyed the annual visits of the townspeople to the estate. It was Cunningham's descendants who gifted the Cunningham-Watt Park to Stewarton.

Robertland was owned by Alan Burns Williamson, Baron Robertland in 2004. Sir Edward Hunter-Blair, 8th Baronet "married" Jonet Clemency Wilson Reid of Robertland, daughter of David Reid of Robertland, Baron of Robertland and Archivist of Glasgow University and his wife Diana Rosamond Angell secretary of the Baronetage of Scotland (1973–1997). The present owner from February 2005 has been Brian Douglas Parsons of Robertland, Baron of Ormiston and of Robertland.

==== Access ====
An old road also crossed the Annick Water on a bridge near the site called the 'castle' in the Templehouse/Darlington area of Stewarton here and ran up to Robertland Castle and Nether Robertland on the East side of the river; John Thomson's map of 1832 is the last to show this road and the lack of a driveway down from the Old Glasgow Road. The access on the East side of the river no longer exists and the driveway runs down from a gatehouse on the Old Glasgow Road, and over the Annick Water by the Robertland Bridge.

==== Robertland and the suffragettes ====
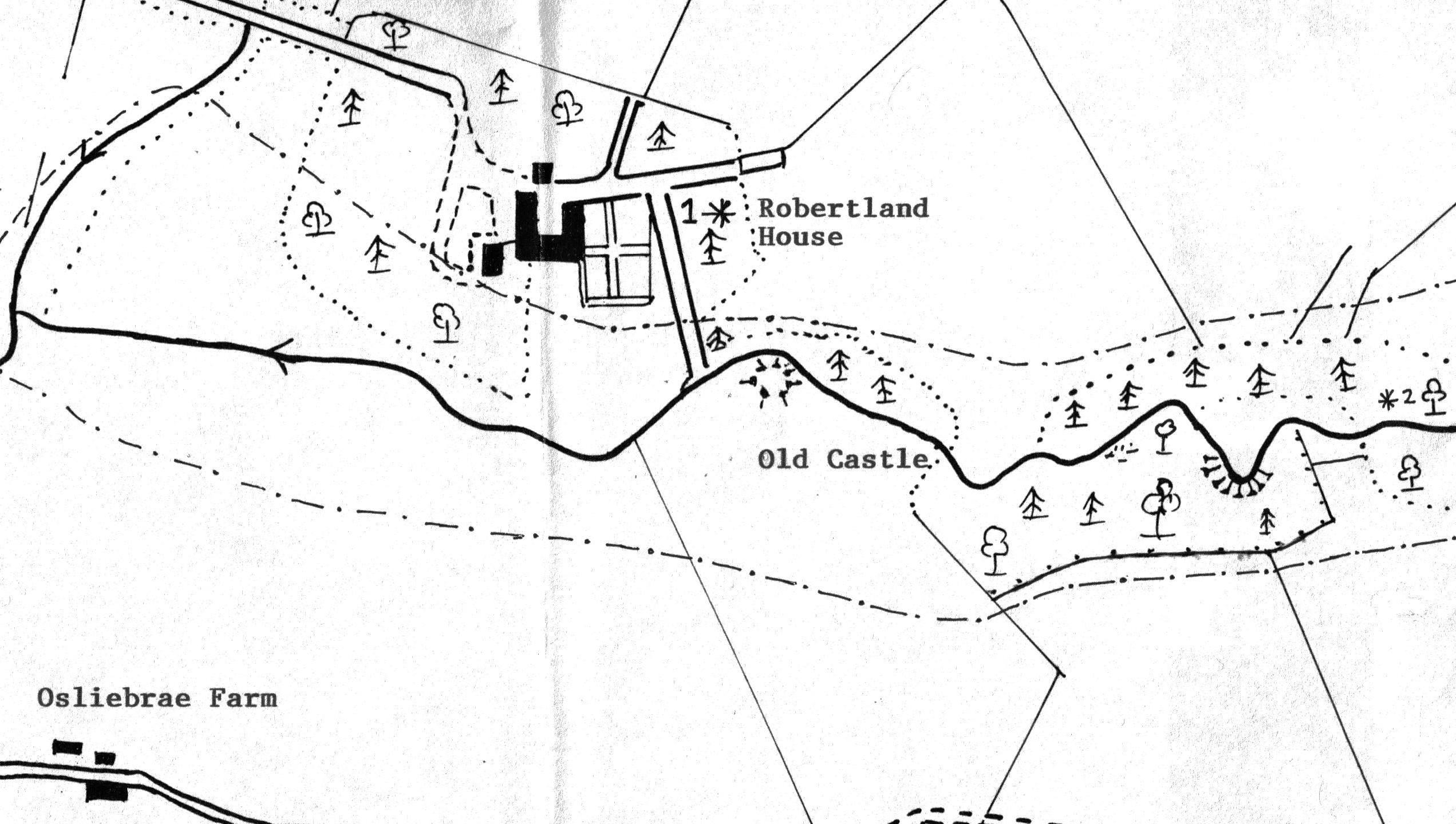
Robertland house and the old castle site

On Friday, 12 March 1914 as the house was empty and awaiting a buyer, two suffragettes broke in through a conservatory window and set the building alight. The Fire Brigade had much trouble obtaining water and the front was burnt out. The rear wing and outbuildings were saved and the front was rebuilt.

The suffragettes left two postcards indicating that this was done as revenge for acts carried out against Mrs. Emmeline Pankhurst and to help force the church to act independently against the state on this issue of votes for women (Milligan). The footprints were followed through the snow towards Fulshaw where they had parked a car and made good their escape towards Glasgow. The event caught the national press at the time.

A view of the Gatehouse at Robertland. Circa 1930.

=== The lairds of Robertland ===
David Cunninghame of Bartonholme was the ancestor of this branch of the Cunninghame family. He was the only son of the second marriage in 1499 (to Dame Marion of Auchinleck), of William Cunninghame of Craigends.

In 1526 James V gave Robertland to Henry Kempt, a favourite, however the lands were in the ownership of Lord Semple by 1556.

David Cunninghame of Robertland, married to Margaret Cunninghame, took part in the slaying of Hugh, Earl of Eglinton at the Annick Ford and was exiled to Denmark. He was pardoned on the occasion of the marriage of King James VI and Anne of Denmark, a stone in the garden over the doorway bears the Royal Arms of Scotland and commemorates this wedding. The lady of Lainshaw who was central to the assassination, Margaret Cunninghame, was originally from the Cunninghame stronghold of Aiket Castle; David Cunninghame of Robertland was married to one of her sisters.

The son of this David, also a David Cunningham of Robertland, was Master of the king's Works in Scotland after the death of William Schaw. He may have been an architect and followed the court of James VI to England, having first been knighted in 1604 and then made Surveyor to the Works in England between 1604 and 1606. Sir James Murray of Kilbaberton replaced him in 1607. Sir David Cunninghame was created a Baronet of Nova Scotia in 1630 and his son was a Commissioner of Supply. Diana Cunninghame was an only daughter of another Sir David. She married Thomas Cochrane of Polkelly in the mid 17th century and much of the estate was sold at around this time.

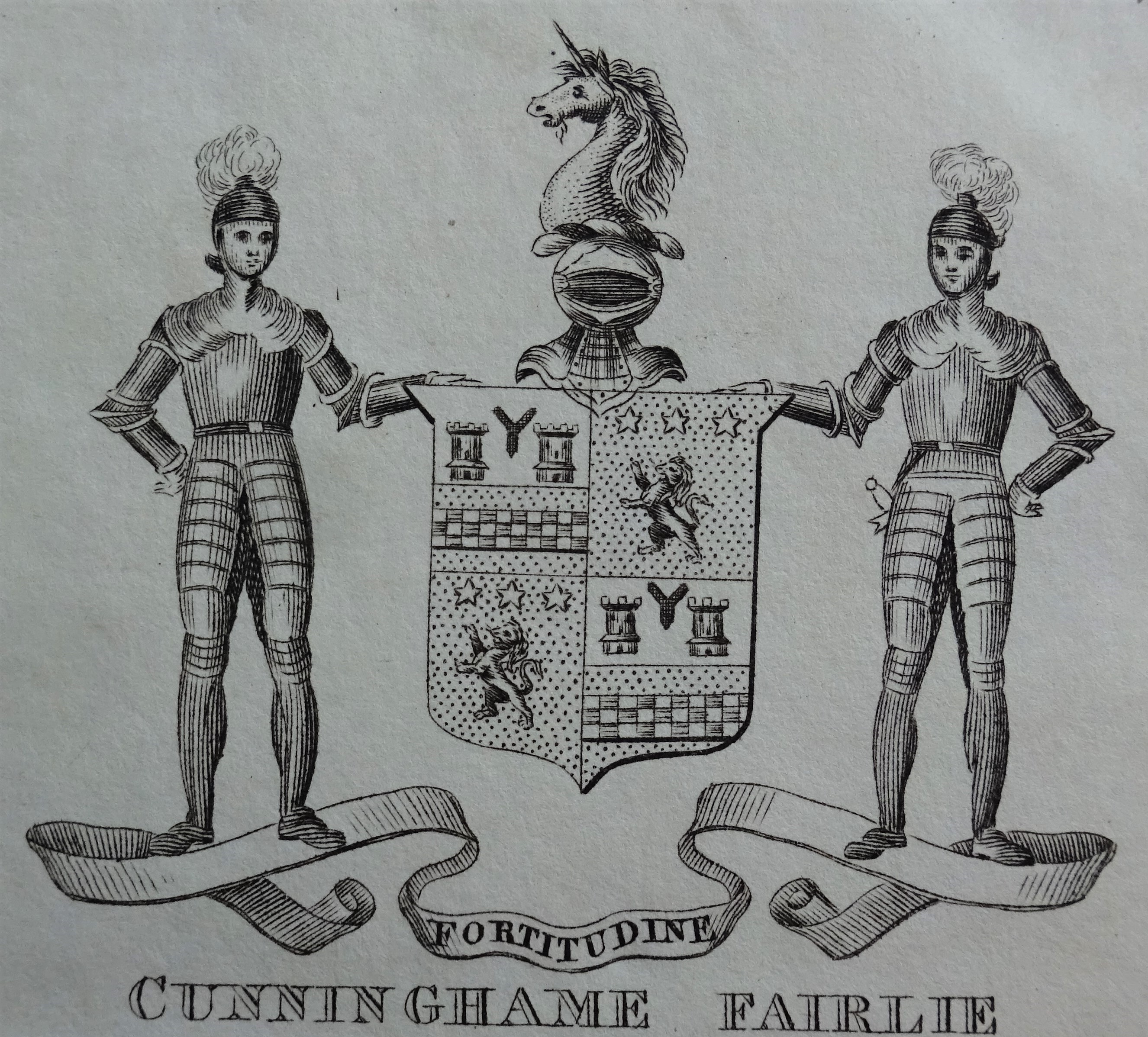
Cunninghame Fairlie of Robertland

In 1672 Alexander Cunninghame inherited Robertland; he married the heiress of John Cunninghame of Kilmarnock, fourth son of the 7th Earl of Glencairn. Alexander had three children, David, Alexander and Jean (married Alexander Forrester). Sir William Cunninghame of Auchinskeith (now Dallars) acquired the property through marriage to Margaret Fairlie of Fairlie in the 18th century.

In July 1616 William, Lord Kilmaurs, conveyed "the lands of Coktress, the manorplace of Kilmaurs, the Waird, Quhatfauld, Bathe, Jakisthorn, etc.," to David Cunningham of Robertland. and the property was in use by William Logan, the Robertland Estate Factor, when a series of letters were written here from May 1774 to 1784.

The lairds of Robertland, like their fellow lairds at Caldwell, Giffordland, Lyne and elsewhere, kept a town house in Irvine.

== Robert Burns at Robertland ==
Robertland was the Ayrshire home of Sir James Hunter Blair, who was the son of an Ayr merchant, and changed his name, adding 'Blair' upon his marriage. He was Lord Provost of Edinburgh from 1784–1786 and entertained Robert Burns at his Edinburgh home and gave him assistance. Burns refers to him in his poem, Elegy on the death of Sir James Hunter Blair.

Burns also visited Robertland and is said to have revealed the identity of Tam O'Shanter as being Douglas Graham during a visit to the house, saying "Tam! It was none else than the guid man of Shanter". John Smith of Swindridgemuir relates in a letter of 1829 that he was present at a social occasion at Robertland, hosted by Sir William Cunningham at which Robert Burns was present and a discussion took place about the identity of Tam o'Shanter during which the poet revealed that one Douglas Grahame was the individual upon whom Tam was modelled. Sir William Cunninghame of Auchinskeith (now Dallars) acquired the property through marriage to Margaret Fairlie of Fairlie and he also invited Robert Burns to Robertland. The Lady 'C', referred to in letter of 3 April 1786 to Robert Aitken in Ayr, may have been Lady Cunninghame. Burns wrote to Sir William at Robertland in 1789.

Burns was researching the origin of the song 'The Lass of Peaty's Mill' and during a visit to Robertland Sir William Cunninghame of Robertland told the story that the Earl of Loudoun was out walking with his son and the poet Allan Ramsay, at a place called 'Patie's Mill', when they were all taken by the beauty of a young country girl who was working the hay. The earl commented to his companions that 'she would be a fine theme for a song' and Allan Ramsay quickly composed this song in memory of the event.

It is thought that Robert Burnes, Uncle to the poet and latterly a resident in Stewarton, was the Robertland estate Land Steward.

== The murder of the 4th Earl of Eglinton ==
George Robertson gave a 'traditional' version of the death of the earl, in which Cunninghame of Clonbeith Castle was stated as being an accessory, caught and killed in Hamilton. The earl is said to have been on his way to a visit to the laird of Robertland Castle, but stopped first for refreshment at Lainshaw Castle. The Laird of Lainshaw, a Montgomerie, tried to dissuade him from continuing his journey, but to no avail and on his way back from Robertland he was met and murdered by Cunninghame of Aiket Castle at a place in Stewarton called "the Windy-path". He was shot and although dying he was able to stay in the saddle until he reached the Annick Ford where he fell from his horse and expired immediately. The Windy-path has been called the 'Mourning or weeping-path' since that day and is marked as such on the OS maps.

== Natural history ==
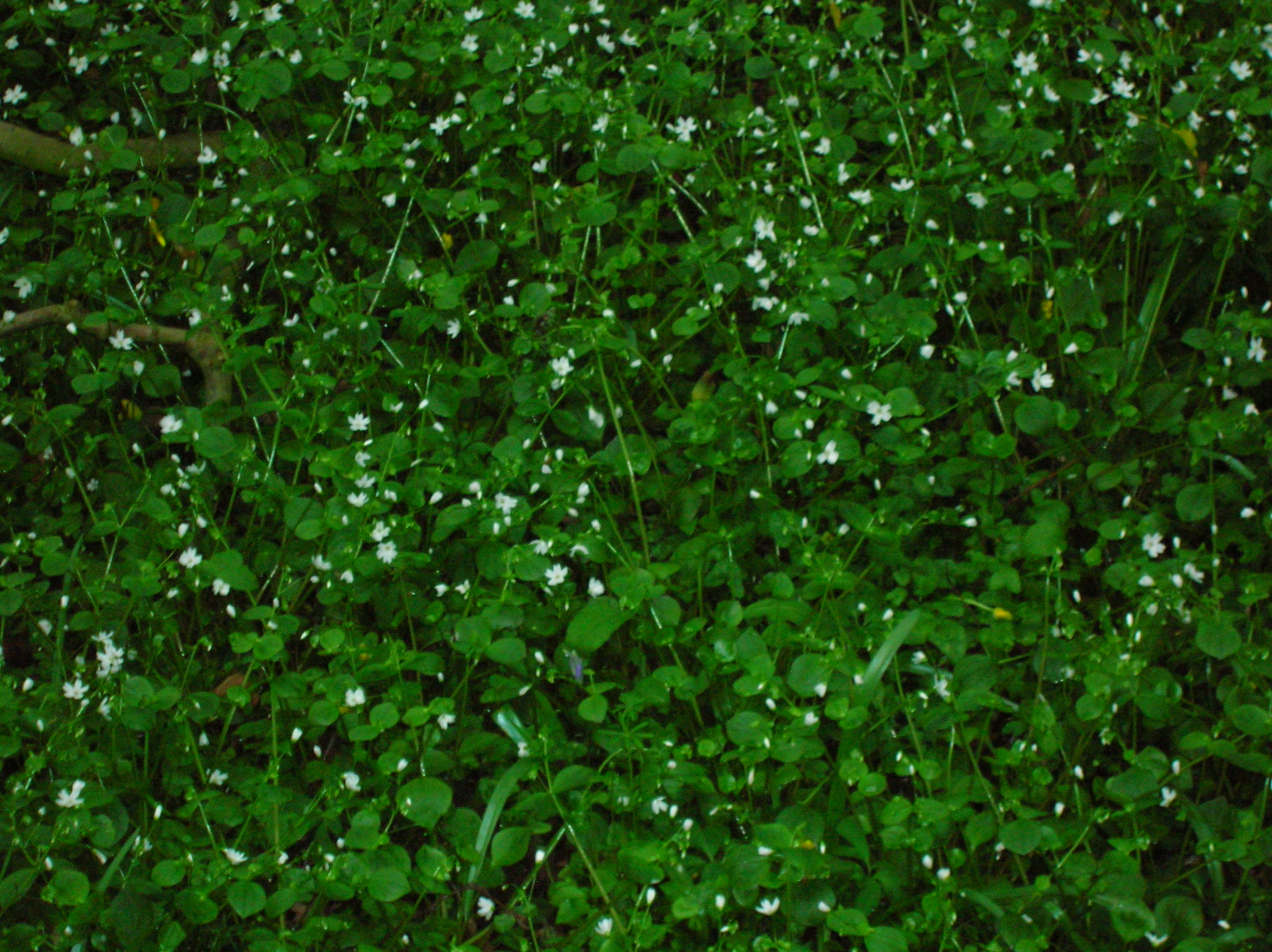
The Pink Purslane or 'Stewarton Flower' (Montia sibirica). Common under local hedges and in the Stewarton woods.

James Forrest of Mid Lambroughton was a noted botanist and he recorded the rare Adder's tongue Fern in the Swinzie Burn glen at Robertland in the 1920s. The Stewarton Flower, so named due to its local abundance and recorded as such by the Kilmarnock Glenfield Ramblers, is otherwise known as Pink Purslane (Claytonia sibirica), found in damp areas. The plant was introduced from its native North America, quite possibly at the Robertland Estate.

== Micro-history ==
The origins of the name are not known, however the spelling is consistent and it may be simply 'Robert's Lands'. The name Swinzie and Sinzie may relate; the latter being Scots for a feature that cuts between two others, as does the burn, cutting a glen through the hillside.

In 1670 Sir Alexander Cunninghame had some of his horses seized for payment of a debt and brought to Irvine cross to be sold. Sir Alexander had complained to the Earl of Eglinton who was Bailie of Cunninghame without success, so he got together a party of twenty men, well mounted, with swords, pistols, and plate sleeves and went to Irvine to recover his property. Alexander Kennedy had threatened some of the crowd with his gun and was knocked off his horse by the townsfolk. John Reid, a towns officer emerged from the tolbooth with his halbert and attacked Kennedy, who died nine days later. Several shots were fired before Robertland's party rode off. John Reid was not punished for his actions.

In the Stewarton Laigh Kirk graveyard is an extraordinary tombstone memorial to Jane Watt, the spouse of Andrew Picken of Robertland, who died in 1857. The tombstone is horizontal, at least 8-foot (2.4 m) by 5-foot (1.5 m) and made of cast-iron.

A Nether Robertland mill existed in Stewarton and a Robertland Brewery in Kilmarnock.

The Queen Victoria Jubilee was celebrated in a field at Robertland, with school children walking up to take part in games and foot races.

Aiton recorded in 1808 that Sir William Cunningham of Robertland found three seams of workable coal on his lands.

== See also ==
- Lambroughton
- Corsehill
- Lands of Blacklaw
