= Charlton House =

Jacobean building in Charlton

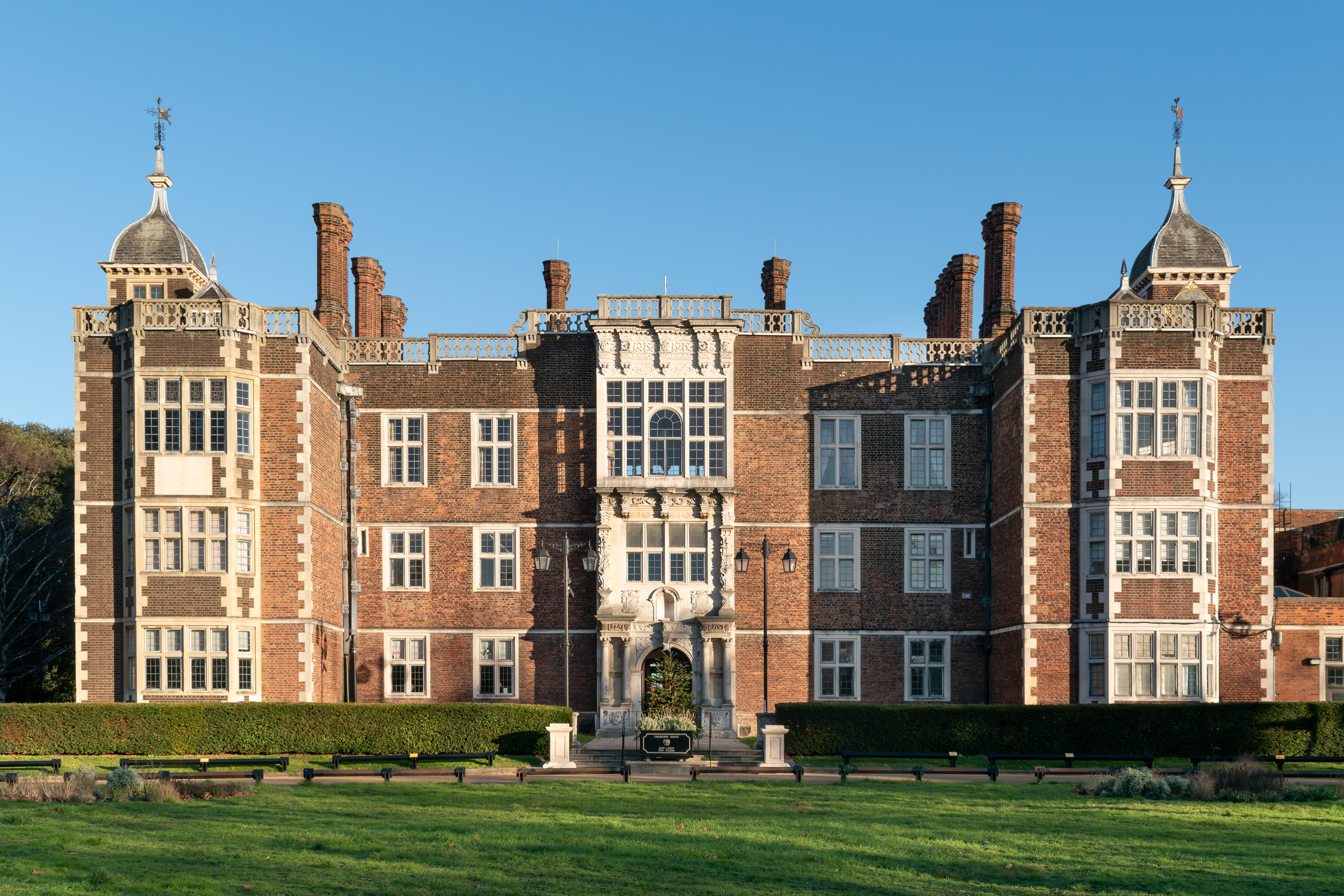
- Charlton House, London

- Location within Royal Borough of Greenwich
- 51°28′50″N 0°02′14″E
- OS grid reference: TQ4155577714

History
- Built: 1607–1612

Site notes
- Architect: Attributed to John Thorpe
- Architectural style: Jacobean
- Owner: Royal Greenwich Heritage Trust

Listed Building – Grade I
- Official name: Charlton House
- Designated: 19 October 1951
- Reference no.: 1218593

Listed Building – Grade I
- Official name: Garden House to NW of Charlton House
- Designated: 10 October 1951
- Reference no.: 1291892

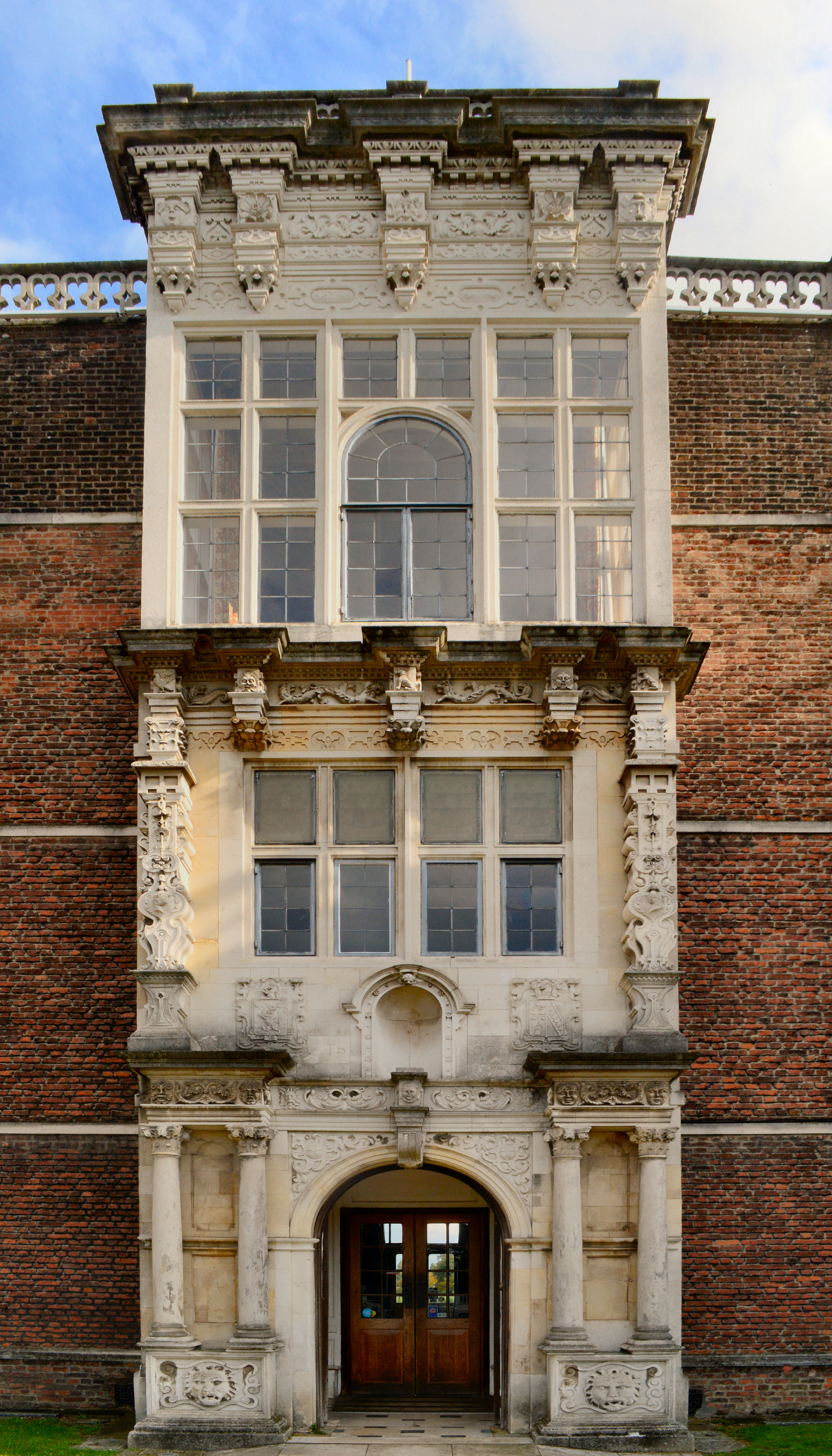
The entrance

Charlton House is a Jacobean mansion in Charlton, within the Royal Borough of Greenwich in south-east London. Built between 1607 and 1612, it is widely regarded as one of the finest and best-preserved examples of Jacobean domestic architecture in England, and the only complete Jacobean mansion surviving in Greater London following the destruction of Holland House during the Second World War. The house was built for Sir Adam Newton, Dean of Durham and tutor to Prince Henry, eldest son of King James I. Now managed by the Royal Greenwich Heritage Trust, it serves as a community centre and events venue.

== History ==
=== Construction and royal connections ===
The house was built between 1607 and 1612 of red brick with stone dressings, laid out to an H-plan. The interior retains contemporary features including oak staircases, panelled rooms, ornamental plasterwork ceilings, and elaborate chimney pieces. Sir Adam Newton acquired the Charlton estate in 1606, having been appointed around 1600 as tutor to Prince Henry. Newton served as the prince's tutor until 1610, when Henry established his own household at St James's Palace, whereupon Newton became his secretary.

Prince Henry, widely regarded as an exemplary Renaissance prince—athletic, cultured, and a patron of the arts—died unexpectedly of typhoid fever on 6 November 1612, aged only eighteen. His death caused widespread national mourning and meant that the throne would eventually pass to his younger brother, the future Charles I. The diarist John Evelyn, who knew the house and was well acquainted with Newton's son Sir Henry Newton, stated that the house had been built for Prince Henry, though it seems more likely Newton intended it as his own residence.

After Prince Henry's death, Newton continued to serve the royal household, becoming receiver-general to Prince Charles. In 1620 he was created a baronet. Royal connections are evident throughout the house in decorative elements including the Prince of Wales's feathers above the east door to the hall and in the saloon; the royal monogram "JR" (for James I); the royal Stuart coat of arms in the west bay; and the Garter and Prince of Wales's motto "Ich Dien" in the east bay.

=== Architecture and attribution ===
Because of Sir Adam Newton's court connections, the designer of the house is often attributed to John Thorpe (c.1565–1655), one of England's first professional architects. Thorpe had served as Clerk of Works for the royal palace at Greenwich and left the Office of Works in 1601 for private practice.

Architecturally, Charlton House represents a transitional moment in English domestic architecture. Built when Renaissance ideas about symmetry and proportion were beginning to influence English design, the house bridges the sprawling style of the Tudor age and the more compact, geometrically regular character associated with Inigo Jones and the mature Jacobean style. The architectural historian Nikolaus Pevsner described Charlton House as containing "the most exuberant decoration" of any Jacobean house interior.

The garden house or orangery in the northwest corner of the grounds has been attributed to Inigo Jones, though there is no documentary evidence for this claim. Cherry and Pevsner date the structure to c.1630 and consider the Jonesian attribution "quite justifiable" on stylistic grounds, noting the Tuscan pilasters and the "complete absence of Jacobean frills at such an early date". It is a Grade I listed building.

=== Location and historical context ===
Charlton House occupies elevated ground overlooking the Thames on what is now the A206 Woolwich Road, historically the main route between Greenwich and Woolwich. John Evelyn described the view from the house as "one of the most noble in the world, for city, river, ships, meadows, hills, woods and all other amenities".

During the period of the house's construction, it stood within a landscape dominated by royal and military establishments. To the west lay Greenwich Palace, where Prince Henry's mother Anne of Denmark resided, and the Royal Observatory; to the east developed the Royal Arsenal (established 1696), the Royal Military Repository (1778), and the Royal Artillery Barracks (1776).

=== Later owners and subsequent history ===
Behind the orangery stands a mulberry tree (Morus nigra) said to be among the oldest of its species in England, which has been afforded Great Tree of London status. It is thought to have been planted in 1608 at the order of James I as part of his unsuccessful attempt to establish a silk industry in England. Giacomo Castelvetro, an Italian writer, stayed at Charlton in 1613 and wrote a treatise on fruit and vegetables.

Adam Newton died in 1629 and his executors Peter Newton and the Scottish architect David Cunningham of Auchenharvie rebuilt nearby St Luke's Church. He is buried there alongside his wife Katherine, commemorated by a monument in black and white marble. The estate passed to his son Sir Henry Newton, the 3rd Baronet, a staunch Royalist who had to flee Charlton during the English Civil War. Henry fought at the Battle of Edgehill and subsequently became known as "a generous benefactor to the poor cavaliers whose services were not rewarded by King Charles II".

Anne, Lady Halkett was married in 1656 at Charlton House; the service was conducted in her brother-in-law Sir Henry Newton's closet by Mr Robert Gale, chaplain of Christian Cavendish, Countess of Devonshire.

In 1658 the estate was purchased by Sir William Ducie, afterwards Viscount Downe, who made additions to the house. On his death in 1680, it was bought by Sir William Langhorne, a wealthy East India Company merchant. It passed to his nephew, Sir John Conyers, in 1715, and remained in the family, being inherited by Jane (née Weller), the wife of Sir Thomas Spencer Wilson, in 1777. One of Jane's daughters married Spencer Perceval, who became Prime Minister in 1809 and was assassinated in the House of Commons in 1812. Perceval is buried in St Luke's Church.

Under the ownership of Sir Thomas Maryon Wilson, a library wing was added to the house by Norman Shaw in 1877, designed to emulate the earlier Jacobean style down to the detail of the plasterwork ceiling.

=== 20th century to present ===
During World War I, Charlton House served as divisional headquarters of the Red Cross for Greenwich and Woolwich. At the war's end, when London hospitals could not cope with the numbers of wounded, Sir Spencer and Lady Maryon-Wilson made the entire house available to the Red Cross as an auxiliary hospital. It operated from 14 October 1918 to 30 April 1919, with around 70 beds.

In 1925 Sir Spencer sold the house and grounds to the Metropolitan Borough of Greenwich.

In 2014, management of Charlton House was transferred to the Royal Greenwich Heritage Trust, a registered charity established to care for key heritage assets within the Royal Borough of Greenwich. The Trust maintains the house as a community centre and events venue, offering a café, exhibitions, and facilities for private hire, with the principal rooms open to the public when not in use.

== Grounds and gardens ==
Much of the former pleasure grounds now forms Charlton Park, though remnants of the house gardens survive, including a short section of ha-ha. The original gateway to the estate now stands isolated in the front lawn, having been marooned there when the Maryon-Wilson family enclosed the village green in 1829.

The walled gardens and perennial borders were redesigned and replanted by landscape designer Andrew Fisher Tomlin in 2003–2004, with perennial meadow planting in the main walled kitchen garden retaining three ancient Prunus trees. One space includes an Amnesty International Peace Garden, also designed by Fisher Tomlin.

== Condition and conservation ==
In November 2024, Charlton House was added to Historic England's Heritage at Risk register with a condition assessment of "very bad" and a priority classification of "A - Immediate risk of further rapid deterioration or loss of fabric; no solution agreed". Part of the extensive roof is in very poor condition, with water ingress causing damage to the historic interiors. Building services also require upgrading. The Royal Greenwich Heritage Trust is working with Historic England to secure funding for comprehensive repairs.

== Film location ==
In 1996 the house was the main location for the feature film Monarch, released in 2000, produced and directed by local filmmaker John Walsh.
