= Sir David Cunningham, 1st Baronet, of Robertland =

Scottish landowner

Sir David Cunningham, 1st Baronet of Robertland was a Scottish landowner. Letters sent to him, held by the National Records of Scotland, are an important source for historians.

== Background ==
He was the son of David Cunningham of Robertland (d. 1619) and Margaret Fleming, daughter of Patrick Fleming of Barrochan. His grandfather David Cunningham of Robertland (d. 1607) was Master of Work for James VI of Scotland. Robertland is located near Stewarton, in the old district of Cunninghame, and is now part of East Ayrshire, Scotland.

== The Cunningham letters ==
A number of letters to him from his older cousin Sir David Cunningham of Auchenharvie survive in the National Records of Scotland in Edinburgh. In 1633, Auchenharvie bought clothes in London for Robertland to wear in Edinburgh during the coronation visit of King Charles in 1633, following the colours and styles of clothes made by the king's tailor Patrick Black. On 1 May 1633, Auchenharvie wrote:

"Now you shall expect a very rich cloth of silver doublet with black satin breeches and satin cloak much laced as the fashion is. This suit is for all great days and holly days and when for variety you please to make this suit somewhat worse there is a black satin doublet suitable, also you shall have another fair new kind of wrought satin suit willow colour with silver lace doublet breeches and cloak, to which for change and variety your satin doublet will suit very well, you shall have stockings, garters, roses, points, girdles, hat bands, and some few facing bands to make you complete, they will cost you dear enough."

David Cunningham married Elizabeth Jousie in 1637, a daughter of the Edinburgh textile merchant and royal financier Robert Jousie, and widow of the goldsmith James Heriot (d. 1634) a brother of George Heriot. Charles I made him a Baronet of Nova Scotia on 25 November 1630, by Letters Patent to him and his heirs male whatsoever.

In 1639 Robert Johnstone LLD, a friend of George Heriot who had been Robert Jousie's executor, bequeathed him a Portuguese ducat, with a diamond ring for Elizabeth Jousie's daughter.

Baronetage of Nova Scotia
New creation	Baronet (of Robertland); 1630–c.1665	Succeeded by David Cunningham
