= John Veitch of Dawyck =

Master of Work to the Crown of Scotland

Sir John Veitch of Dawyck was a Scottish landowner, administrator, and Master of Work in Scotland for Charles I.

He was the son of James Veitch of Dawyck and Christian Murray, a daughter of John Murray of Black Barony.

The family estates were at Dawyck House at Drumelzier in the Scottish Borders.

Veitch paid the overseer of work at Holyrood monthly from July to October 1639. He paid the master mason John Mylne for works at Edinburgh Castle in August 1639.

On 3 September 1641, Veitch was paid as Master of Works for repairs at Holyrood Palace and Holyrood Abbey.

He married Christian Naesmyth. They had a son John Veitch, who died in 1704.
