= Gillian Riley =

English food writer (1933–2024)

Gillian Riley (20 November 1933 – 11 November 2024) was an English food writer.

== Biography ==
Riley was born on 20 November 1933. She was brought up in Yorkshire, read History at Cambridge University. After obtaining a diploma in education, she went to live in London where she worked as a designer in print and publishing, combining this with part-time teaching. Study trips to Italy in pursuit of lettering and inscriptions fuelled a passion for the history of Italian gastronomy which gradually took over her life. Her illustrated translation of Giacomo Castelvetro's The Fruit, Herbs & Vegetables of Italy was published by Viking Penguin in 1989, and in paperback, text only, by Prospect Books in 2012. Then followed three titles in the Painters & Food series for Pomegranate Books: Renaissance Recipes, Impressionist Picnics, and The Dutch Table. A ''Feast for the Eyes, the National Gallery Cookbook, involved the lateral thinking needed to use art to illuminate the story of food, and food to shed light on hitherto ignored aspects of painting. Food in Art, Reaktion Books 2015, covers earliest times to the Renaissance. The Oxford Companion to Italian Food, OUP 2007 describes contemporary Italian food in its historic background. She later worked on a biography of Ulisse Aldrovandi, the sixteenth century naturalist. Her husband was librarian and printing historian James Mosley. Riley died on 11 November 2024, at the age of 90.

== Works ==
Books

- Renaissance Recipes. Pomegranate Artbooks. 1993.
- Impressionistic Picnics. Pomegranate Artbooks. 1993.
- A Feast for the Eyes: Evocative recipes and surprising tales inspired by paintings in the National Gallery. National Gallery London Publications. 1998.
- The Oxford Companion to Italian Food. Oxford University Press. 2007.

As translator

- Castelvetro, Giacomo (1989). The fruit, herbs and vegetables of Italy. Viking Penguin. (translator)

Selected articles

- 2016 : "How art can help food historians to know their onions" at Art UK (14 October 2016)
- 2018 : "Wild courses: Gillian Riley explores the cultural traditions of preparing and eating game" in Hackney Citizen (7 August 2018)
- 2018 : "Living Dangerously with Pomegranates" in Hackney Citizen (8 May 2019)
- 2020 : "Some like it hot" in Hackney Citizen (14 December 2018)
- 2019 : "From fast to feast" in Hackney Citizen (8 May 2019)
- 2020 : "Some like it hot" in Hackney Citizen (4 September 2020)
