= Sir Adam Newton, 1st Baronet =

Scottish scholar, royal tutor, dean and baronet (died 1630)

Sir Adam Newton, 1st Baronet (died 1630) was a Scottish scholar, royal tutor, dean of Durham and baronet.

== Life ==
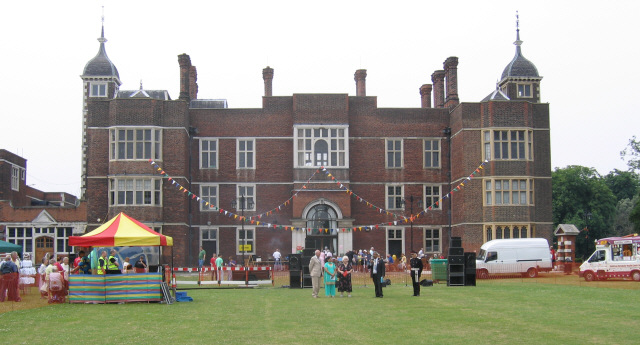
Adam Newton's Charlton House

He was the son of Adam Newton, a baker or "baxter" who was a burgess of Edinburgh from February 1562.

He spent part of his early life in France, passing himself off as a priest and teaching at the college of St. Maixant in Poitou. There, for some time between 1580 and 1590, he instructed the future theologian André Rivet in Greek. After his return to Scotland in about 1600, he was appointed to tutor Prince Henry at Stirling Castle. In 1602 he bought books for the prince from Andro Hart in Edinburgh.

Naturalization of Adam Newton Act 1603
- Act of Parliament
- Parliament of England
- Long title: An Act for the naturalizing of Adam Newton, esquire.
- Citation: 1 Jas. 1. c. 25 Pr. (Note: This is the citation in The Statutes of the Realm.); 1 Jas. 1. c. 24 Pr. (Note: This is the citation in The Statutes at Large.)
- Territorial extent: England and Wales

Dates
- Royal assent: 7 July 1604
- Commencement: 19 March 1604 (Note: Start of session.)

Status: Current legislation

After the Union of the Crowns, Anne of Denmark held a meeting on 4 May 1603 with the Earl of Linlithgow (who looked after Princess Elizabeth), Adam Newton (the tutor of Prince Henry), and Alexander Wilson, a tailor who made clothes for the royal children. They made an inventory or schedule of what clothes needed to be made in the next ten days before their journey to England.

Aadam Newton came to England, and was naturalised as an English citizen in James's first English parliament by an act of Parliament (1 Jas. 1. c. 25). In 1605 he obtained the deanery of Durham through royal influence, although he was not in orders, and was installed by proxy. The duties of the office must also have been done by proxy, if at all. In 1606 he acquired the manor of Charlton, Kent, where he built Charlton House.

The English ambassador in Venice, Henry Wotton, sent a gift of Venetian treacle, made with balsam, to David Murray and Adam Newton. Robert Cecil, 1st Earl of Salisbury wrote humorous letters to Newton. Apologising for a breach of manners, he compared himself to the court jester Tom Durie. In another letter to Newton he wrote that if a certain man failed to gain a place in Prince Henry's household, he should be sent to "Tom Dyrry or to me". The applicant was poor but could become rich by charging a fee to all the girls in England who wished to meet the Prince.

He continued as tutor to Prince Henry until 1610, when, upon the formation of a separate household for his pupil, now created Prince of Wales, he was appointed his secretary. After the death of Prince Henry, in 1612, Newton became receiver-general, or treasurer in the household of Prince Charles, relinquishing to Thomas Murray his claim to the secretaryship. He retained his post until his death. In 1620 he was made a baronet, first selling the deanery of Durham to Dr. Richard Hunt, and presumably paying for his new honour with the proceeds. After Charles's accession Newton became secretary to the council, and in 1628 secretary to the marches of Wales, the reversion of which office had been granted to him as early as 1611; it was worth £2,000 year.

He died 13 January 1630. His executors David Cunningham of Auchenharvie and Peter Newton were instructed to use a legacy to rebuild the nearby St Luke's Church, Charlton.

== Works ==
Newton translated into Latin King James's Discourse against Vorstius and books i-vi. of Paolo Sarpi's History of the Council of Trent, which had been published in 1620 in London in an English version made from the Italian original by Sir Nathaniel Brent. Newton's translation was published anonymously in London in 1620. Thomas Smith complimented the work and man in his Vita quorumdam Eruditissimorum Virorum.

== Family ==
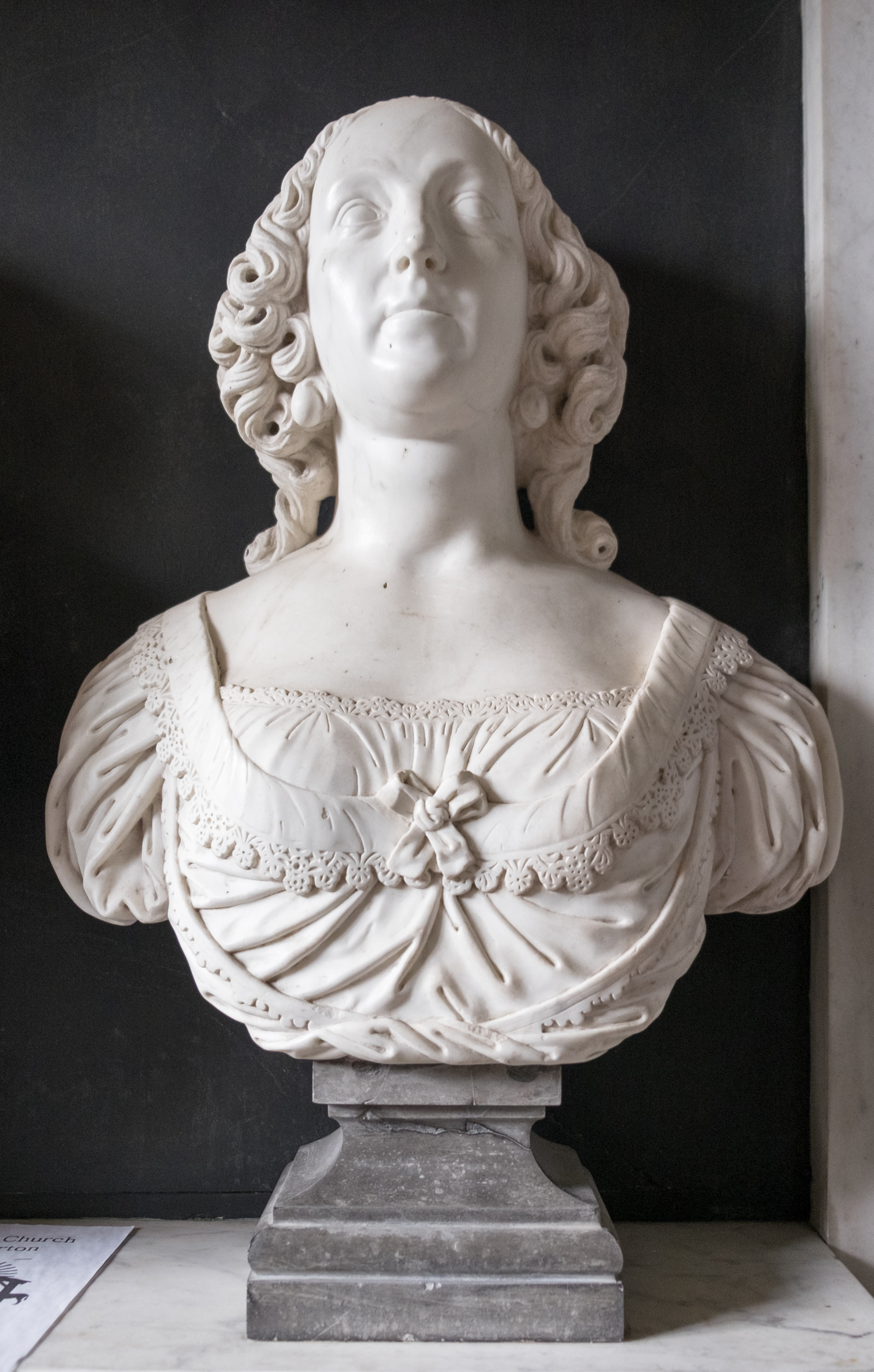
Bust of Elizabeth Peyto, St. Giles, Chesterton

In June 1605 Newton married Katherine Puckering, youngest daughter of Sir John Puckering, lord-keeper of the great seal in the reign of Elizabeth, whose son Thomas Puckering shared the prince's studies under Newton's guidance. King James gave them a gift of silver gilt plate supplied by the London goldsmith John Williams. Elizabeth Newton died in 1618. Their children included:

- Henry Newton, who adopted his mother's surname, and became Sir Henry Puckering, 3rd Baronet, after inheriting his uncle Thomas Puckering's estates and titles in 1654.
- Elizabeth Newton, who married Edward Peyto in 1625
- Jane Newton, who married James Enyon

== Bibliography ==
This article incorporates text from a publication now in the public domain: "Newton, Adam". Dictionary of National Biography. London: Smith, Elder & Co. 1885–1900.

Baronetage of England
New creation	Baronet (of Charlton); 1620–1630	Succeeded by William Newton
