= Giacomo Castelvetro =

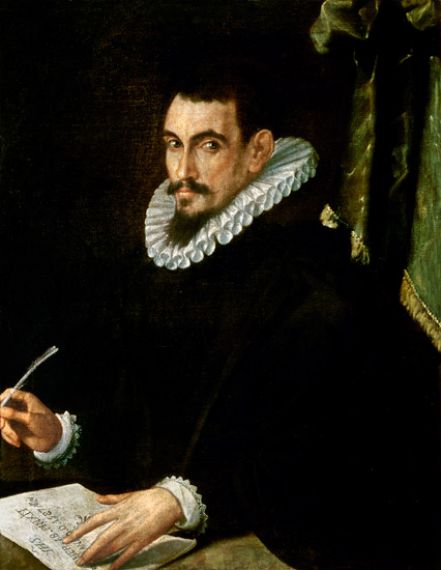
- Oil painting of Castelvetro by Ercole dell'Abbate, 1587
- Born: 25 March 1546; Modena, Italy
- Died: 21 March 1616 (aged 69)
- Occupation: Author

Giacomo Castelvetro (25 March 1546 – 21 March 1616) was an Italian expatriate in Europe and England, humanist, teacher and travel writer.

== Life ==
Giacomo Castelvetro was born in Modena in 1546 to the banker Niccolò Castelvetro and his wife Liberata Tassoni. Not much is known of his early life. He was smuggled out of Modena with his older brother when he was eighteen years old. He stayed in Geneva with his uncle, the humanist critic, Ludovico Castelvetro. He traveled widely for several years, living in the towns of Lyon and Basel before his uncle died. In 1587 in Basel he married Isotta de Canonici, the widow of Thomas Erastus. In 1613 he was living at Charlton House the home of Adam Newton, tutor to Prince Henry. He died impoverished on 21 March 1616 after a long illness.

== Protestantism ==
Having become a Protestant he feared for his life when he returned to Italy in 1578 after the death of his father. He swiftly went to England in 1580 after selling his property. From 1598 he settled in Venice. It was there that his brother Lelio was burnt at the stake as a heretic in 1609. In 1611 he was imprisoned by the inquisition but was rescued by the English ambassador Sir Dudley Carleton who threatened a diplomatic incident if an execution of a servant of the king was authorised. He went back to England to escape "the furious bite of the cruel and pitiless Roman inquisition".

== Patronage and tutorship ==
In 1574 he befriended Sir Roger North of Kirtling on a 1574 visit to England and accompanied his son John on an educational tour in Italy. He was known to travel frequently to Europe after settling in England. He attended the renowned book fairs at Basel and Frankfurt.

In England he received the patronage of Sir Philip Sidney, Sir Francis Walsingham and Sir Christopher Hatton when he became interested in publishing Renaissance works. He was closely involved with the English embassy in Venice and became friends with Sir Henry Wotton who was ambassador there before Sir Dudley Carleton.

In 1592, Castelvetro travelled to Scotland where his wife Isotta died. Castelvetro taught Italian to King James VI and Anne of Denmark. He made friends with the queen's goldsmith Elias Le Tellier.

He gave James VI a manuscript of his works in August 1592, and another manuscript to the Danish ambassador, Niels Krag in 1593, seeking Danish royal patronage. King James later mentioned to the Venetian ambassador Antonio Foscarini that Castelvetro had served him in Scotland for a few years and was well-liked.

After the baptism of Prince Henry in August 1594, Castelvetro joined the service of the Danish diplomat and administrator Christian Barnekow. He went to Sweden in February 1596. Castelvetro wrote to Barnekow from Örebro on 26 March 1596 before travelling to Nyköping. Castelvetro acquainted himself with Duke Charles who later became King of Sweden.

Castelvetro toured Europe in 1598, visiting France, Switzerland and Germany. He set off on another European tour in search of patronage in 1611 after being freed from the Inquisition. He taught Italian at the University of Cambridge for the Spring term in 1613; those he taught included George Stanhope. He is considered to be the most important promoter of the Italian language and heritage after John Florio, the first known teacher of Italian at the University of Oxford.

== Works ==
- Explicatio gravissimae quaestionis utrum excommunicatio (1589)

Castelvetro edited this work of Thomas Erastus and published his collection of medical works (Varia Opuscula Medica) to which Castelvetro wrote the introduction in 1590. He paid for the publishing of Il pastor fido in England in 1591.

- After settling in Venice in 1598 he edited manuscripts on contemporary Italian poetry and fiction for a publisher called G.B Ciotto.
- The fruit, herbs & vegetables of Italy (1614)

He was apparently shocked by the English partiality for meat, lack of green vegetables and sugar-rich diet. Thus he set about writing The fruit, herbs & vegetables of Italy (1614). The manuscript, written in Italian, was circulated amongst supporters. He was, like many Italians, a keen gardener. At the time in which he was writing the British palate was only beginning to absorb culinary flavours from the continent. Aspects of French and Dutch cooking had assimilated into British cooking but eating habits were still centred on the consumption of large quantities of meat. Castelvetro's enthusiasm for a diverse diet preceded John Evelyn's treatise produced in 1699 which equally urged the English to eat more salad vegetables.

The treatise is a valuable historical source on 17th century Italian society. It is interspersed with minute observations and vignettes from his life in Modena and Venice. He mentions children learning to swim in the Brenta whilst attached to huge pumpkins as a means to stay afloat; German wenches, Venetian ladies and intimate conversations with Scandinavian royalty.

He wrote the work at Charlton, and dedicated the work to Lucy, Countess of Bedford on the request of her brother John Harington and on the hope of acquiring future patronage but was unfortunate in this enterprise.

- He later edited a manuscript of Taddeo Duni of Zurich and translated A Remonstrance of James I … for the Right of Kings (1615) but didn't receive the royal patronage he desired.

== Bibliography ==
- --, Gillian Riley, editor and translator, The Fruit, Herbs & Vegetables of Italy; an offering to Lucy, Countess of Bedford (1989), translation of Brieve racconto di tutte le radici, di tutte l'erbe e di tutti i frutti che crudi o cotti in Italia si mangiano (1614) ISBN 978-0-670-82724-4
