= St Luke's Church, Charlton =

Church in Charlton, London, England

Coordinates: 51°28′54″N 0°02′07″E

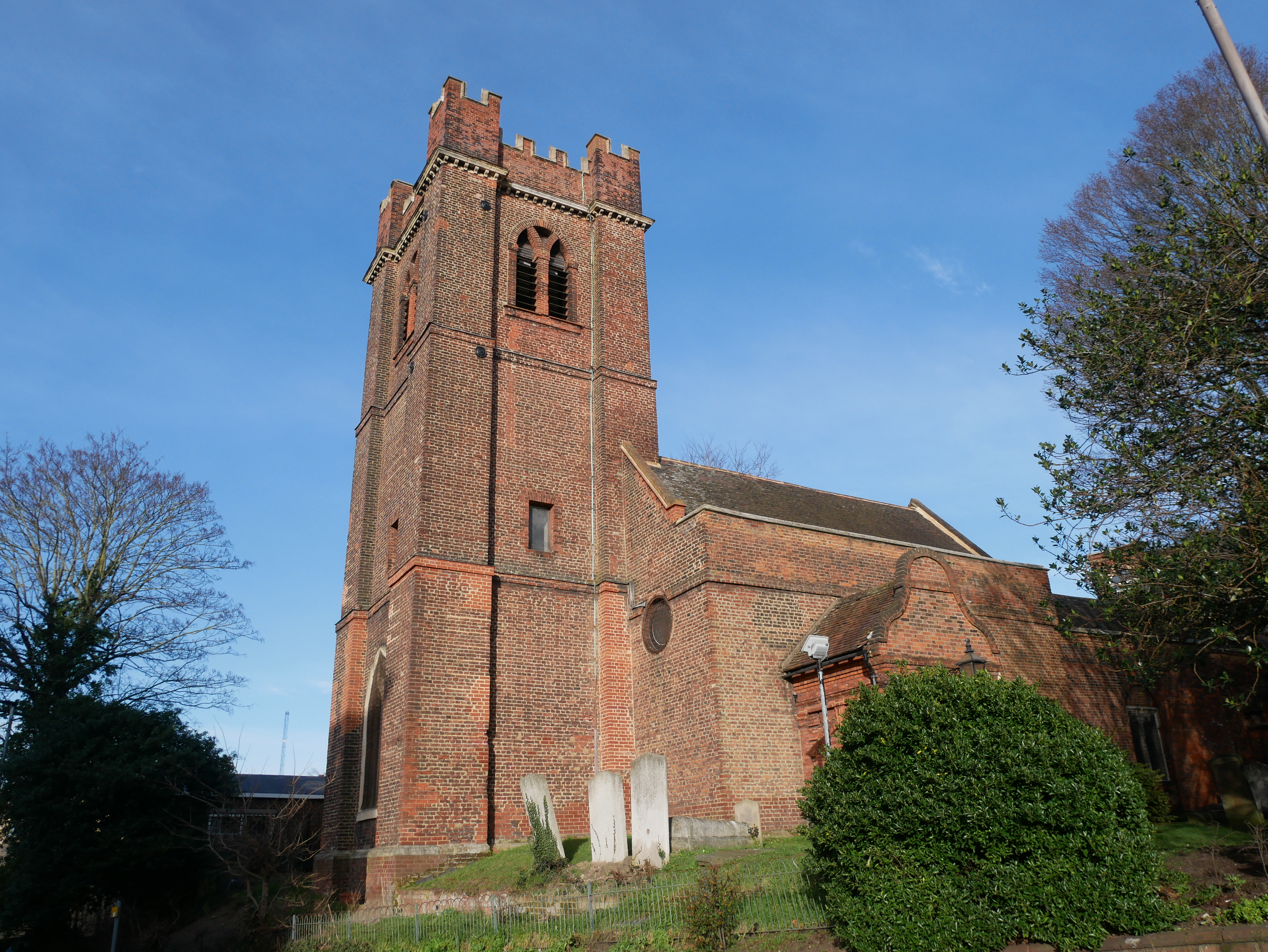
Southeast view of the Church of St Luke, Charlton

St Luke's Church in Charlton, London, England, is an Anglican parish church in the Diocese of Southwark.

Records suggest that a church dedicated to St Luke existed on the site around 1077. It was rebuilt in 1630 with funds provided by Sir Adam Newton, of Charlton House. The coat of arms of one of Newton's executors, the Scottish courtier David Cunningham of Auchenharvie is displayed on the pulpit. The 1630s work, constructed of Kentish red brick, forms the core of the present building, which is Grade II* listed. It was modified in the 17th century, again in 1840 and finally in 1956. Remnants of chalk and flint walls have been found and may relate to the original building.

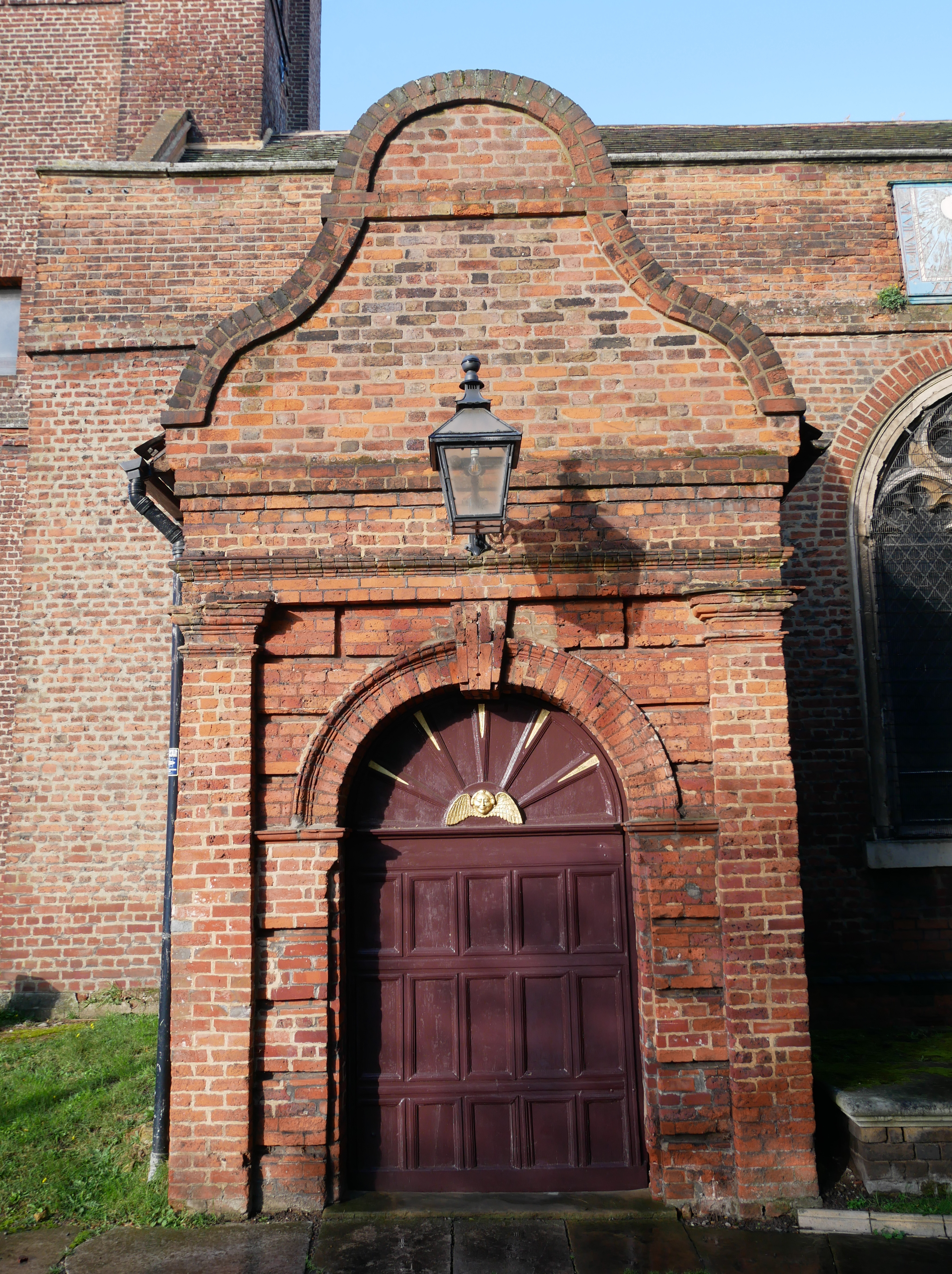
Porch on the south side of the church

The church operated under the aegis of Bermondsey Abbey until the Dissolution of the Monasteries; thereafter, in 1607, the lands upon which it stood passed to Newton. It now practises the Modern Catholic tradition.

Marriages of notable people at St Luke's include that of Anne Shovell, granddaughter of Sir Cloudesley Shovell, to John Blackwood on 28 July 1726.

== Burials ==
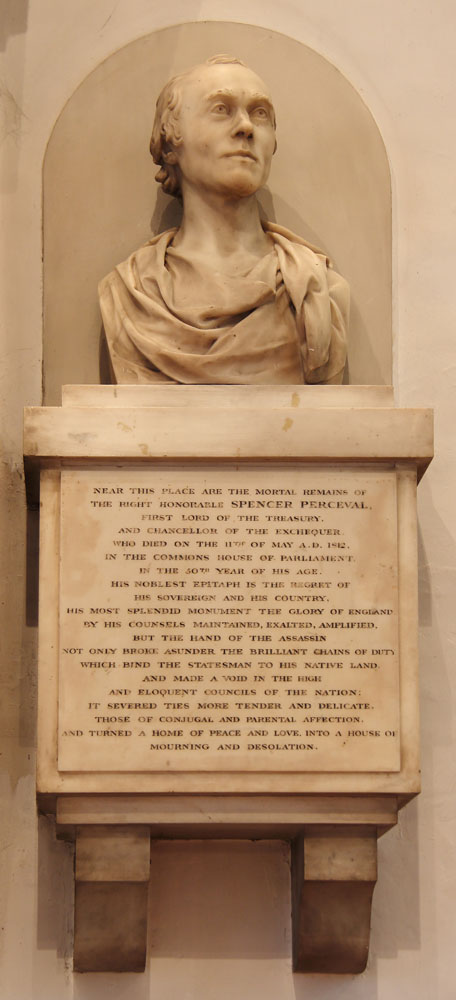
Memorial to Spencer Perceval in St Luke's Church

Among the people buried at the church are two whose deaths were political assassinations. One of those is the British Prime Minister Spencer Perceval, and the other Edward Drummond, a personal secretary to several British Prime Ministers whose murder led to the establishment of the legal test for insanity known as the M'Naghten rules in assessment of criminal culpability. (Note: Edward Drummond's brother was rector at the time.) The church's patron, Sir Adam Newton (former tutor to the Prince of Wales) and his wife Katharine, are buried in the church, as are a number of other royal servants: Edward Wilkinson (d.1567), master-cook to Queen Elizabeth; Brigadier Michael Richards (d.1721), Surveyor-General of the Ordnance to King George I; and John Griffith (d.1713), brigadier of the second troop of Guards, under Queen Anne.

Sir William Congreve, 1st Baronet, founder and Superintendent of the Royal Military Repository at Woolwich, is buried in the churchyard.

== White Ensign ==
The church is entitled to fly the ensign that was in use prior to the 1800 Acts of Union. It can do so on the saint's days of St Luke and St George, in recognition of its past role as a navigational landmark for ships on the Thames.
