= David Cunningham Snr =

Scottish musician and composer

David Ireland Cunningham (born 12 May 1943) is a Scottish musician and composer who is well-known and much-respected in the Scottish Country Dance Music field as an accordionist, teacher, composer, and band leader.

For some years, he and his son David have run Thane Productions, a recording studio and production company specializing in the Scottish Country Dance genre.

== Early life ==
An only child, David was born in the village of Kettlebridge, Fife, the son of William Cunningham, a joiner, and Christina (Chris) Ireland. Shortly before he was born, his father was sent to serve in Burma so they did not meet until the Second World War was over in 1945.

William played the melodeon and seven-year-old David began to play it too but secretly, for fear of getting into trouble. Christina heard him although she said nothing to him and, when he was eight, his parents presented him with a small second-hand piano accordion. They had also arranged for him to have lessons from local teacher James C Cook. These ceased when his teacher died four years later but, following a further year under the guidance of Bill Wilkie MBE, David had no need for further tuition.

== Professional life ==
By the time he was thirteen, David had auditioned for the BBC and performed for them on "Children's Hour". He appeared on various programmes over the following years - all live in those days - including taking regular spots on BBC Radio Scotland's longest-running programme: "Take the Floor".

He began teaching the accordion at the age of 16, with several pupils later becoming professional musicians and teachers in their own right.

David attended Bell Baxter High School, Cupar, and embarked on a degree course at Duncan of Jordanstone College of Art and Design, Dundee, in 1960 with the aim of going into teaching. However, the pull of music and the theatre was too strong and he left, after a very successful first year, to pursue a career on the Scottish variety theatre circuit.

Signed up to a top Scottish theatrical agency, he played in variety shows throughout Scotland from 1960 to 1962.

In 1962, he was invited by the prominent Scottish dance band leader, David Findlay (later a presenter on Good Morning Scotland), to join his popular and well-established band "The Olympians". For the next 16 years the band broadcast regularly, recorded several albums, and played at dances in their spare time travelling to functions the length and breadth of Britain.

At the suggestion of a BBC producer, David formed the "David Cunningham Trio" in 1963 primarily to be able to perform and record music from outside the Scottish traditional style. However, public pressure soon forced the style's inclusion and the Trio broadcast regularly on BBC programmes throughout the network until 1979.

But he was also working full-time and, in 1981, David retired from playing professionally due to the pressure of work and family commitments.

David has also been involved in transcribing and restoring rare archive recordings of many of the major Scottish musicians for commercial release by international record labels. These include performances by Sir Jimmy Shand; Will Starr; Bobby McLeod; and Jim Cameron.

== Awards ==
In 2002, David was given a Lifetime Achievement Award by the National Association of Accordion and Fiddle Clubs.

In 2007, the Earl of Mansfield presented him with the Royal Scottish Country Dance Society's prestigious "Scroll of Honour" in recognition of his services to the Society.

On 30 November 2024, he was inducted into the Scottish Traditional Music Hall of Fame for his Services to Performance.

== Works ==
From an extensive repertoire, his published works include:

- Agnes Laing's Fancy
- Benvie House
- Bessie & Lawrie Kemp
- The Claybraes Two Step
- Frank & Maureen Robb
- John Crawford of Freuchie
- Ma Petite Chérie
- Master David R Cunningham
- Miss Alison Frew
- Miss Christina Ireland
- Miss Diane Cunningham
- Miss Jean Ritchie
- Mr & Mrs Bob Galloway
- Mrs Agnes Ritchie - the original title tune for the country dance "Starlight"
- Saint Magnus Bay
- William B Cunningham
- William Ritchie Esq

Many of David's compositions have been recorded by prominent bands and groups and they feature regularly on the play lists of BBC radio broadcasts.
