= James Murray (architect) =

Scottish master wright and architect

James Murray of Kilbaberton, (d.1634), was a Scottish master wright and architect. He served as the King's Master of Works under James VI, and Charles I. He was one of the first men in Scotland to be called an architect.

== Career ==
His father James Murray (d.1615) was a gunner and wright in Edinburgh castle and made master wright in 1584. The elder James Murray was involved in transporting deer shipped from England to Falkland Palace. He also built seating and stages at Holyrood Palace for ceremonies when courtiers were ennobled, and a "barrier" intended for a duel between Francis Mowbray and Daniel Archdeacon.

James Murray senior was appointed Overseer of the King's Works in Scotland on 4 May 1601 and on the same day, James Murray younger was made principal master wright and gunner, as his father had been. The younger James Murray was appointed Overseer in 1605, when his father resigned the post, and two years later was appointed principal Master of Works in Scotland, succeeding David Cunningham of Robertland.

In March 1603, James Murray younger constructed new seating in the Chapel Royal at Holyrood Palace. In April 1603, Murray provided James VI with "certain billiards and billiard balls." Murray and his wife Martha Murray were given a plot of land close to the back gate of Holyrood Palace in 1605, which they sold to the royal servants John Buchanan and Margaret Hartsyde in April 1606.

On 28 September 1608, Murray chased Finlay Taylor, a baillie of the Canongate, with a drawn sword in the Abbey Close near Holyroodhouse. According to William Bowyer, Murray was "surveyor and builder" for the Earl of Dunbar's mansion on the site of Berwick Castle.

In 1612, Murray was granted land near Juniper Green, outside Edinburgh. Between 1622 and 1623, he designed and built Baberton House as his home here. The innovative symmetrical u-plan house still stands, although it was extended in the 18th century. Murray's initials, together with those of his wife, Katherine Weir, appear on the house.

King James gave orders for repairs to the royal palaces in Scotland in 1616, anticipating his visit in 1617. At Holyrood, Murray was to take down and repair the roof of the lodging above the outer gate called the Chancellor's Lodging, demolish the lodging in the Palace of Holyrood House called the Master Steward's chamber, rebuild Roger Aston's chamber and Chancellor Maitland's kitchen in the Duke's transe, and demolish lean-to buildings to improve the courtyard. At Stirling Castle, he was to demolish buildings between the inner and outer gate, re-roof the inner gate or fore-work, re-roof the king's kitchen, and rebuild the court kitchen, bakehouse, and pantry. At Falkland Palace, he was to re-roof the king's and queen's galleries overlooking the garden from the east quarter, make a bartisan or wall-walk on a new lead roof, and repair the whole palace, making repairs and new doorways and windows as required.

The north range or quarter of Linlithgow Palace had collapsed in 1607. In February 1619 Murray received permission to demolish part of the remaining masonry adjacent to the north-west corner. November 1619 there was a dispute amongst his workforce at Linlithgow, the Privy Council of Scotland intervened and the mason John Service was imprisoned in the Tolbooth of Edinburgh, and ten other masons were ordered to work for Murray under the conditions he set. Murray was asked by the Privy Council to calculate how much lead would be needed to cover the roof of the new north range at Linlithgow, and he arranged to buy 3,000 stone weight of lead from an Edinburgh merchant.

In 1620 he was asked to investigate the scheme of Emanuell Meether who wanted to set up a glass manufactory in Edinburgh, and subsequently joined a commission to judge glass made at Wemyss.

The accounts mention that Murray and the gardener William Watts were responsible for "platting and contriving his Majesty's new garden and orchard" at Stirling Castle in 1629. The garden includes a surviving octagonal mount called the King's Knot.

Murray drew up plans for Parliament House in Edinburgh in 1633, and the building was constructed to his design over the following years, finally being completed in 1639. As Master of Works, he was also in charge of works at Linlithgow Palace, the reconstruction of Holyrood Palace prior to the coronation of Charles I, and additions to the Great Hall at Edinburgh Castle. He is said to be the principal designer of Malleny House in Balerno, although the house was not completed until after his death.

In 1633, at the coronation of Charles I, Murray was knighted. He died in December of the following year.

== Sources ==
- Colvin, Howard (1978) A Biographical Dictionary of British Architects, 1600-1840 John Murray
- McWilliam, Colin (1994) The Buildings of Scotland: Lothian, Penguin
- Historic Environment Scotland. "Baberton House, including gates, gatepiers and boundary walls (Category A Listed Building LB6129)".

Preceded by David Cunningham of Robertland	Master of Work to the Crown of Scotland; 1607–1634	Succeeded by Anthony Alexander
