= Sir Henry Puckering, 3rd Baronet =

English royalist and politician

Sir Henry Puckering, 3rd Baronet (Newton until 1654; 1618–1701) was an English royalist and politician.

== Life ==
Baptised at St. Dunstan's-in-the-West, London, on 13 April 1618, he was a younger son of Sir Adam Newton of Charlton, Kent, by Katharine, daughter of Lord-keeper Sir John Puckering. On the death of his elder brother, Sir William Newton, he succeeded to the title of baronet and estates. He was admitted at the Inner Temple in 1631, and received an MA from Cambridge on the King's visit there in early 1632.

At the outbreak of the First English Civil War he raised a troop of horse for the king, and was present at the battle of Edgehill. After the king's defeat at the battle of Naseby, however he sought to make terms with the parliament, and in 1646 his fine was fixed (at £1,273); the Commons on 13 July 1647 ordered his fine to be accepted, and pardoned his delinquency. He was about to join the king's forces in Essex in June 1648, when he was seized by order of the parliament, and only released on promising to live quietly in the country.

In 1654 Newton inherited by deed of settlement the estates of his maternal uncle, Sir Thomas Puckering, on the death of the latter's only surviving daughter, Anne, wife of Sir John Bale of Carlton Curlieu, Leicestershire. He then assumed the surname of Puckering, and moved to Sir Thomas's residence, the Priory, Warwick, where in August he received a visit from John Evelyn. Both Puckering and his wife supported distressed cavaliers. At the Restoration Puckering was appointed paymaster-general of the forces. In 1661 he was elected as a Member of Parliament MP for Warwickshire. He held that seat throughout the Cavalier Parliament, and on 6 February 1679 he was elected as an MP for the borough of Warwick. His activity as a justice of the peace, together with his leniency towards the Roman Catholics, made him unpopular. In 1691 he gave the bulk of his library to Trinity College, Cambridge, and afterwards for a period was in residence there; this donation included the Milton manuscripts now in Trinity College Library. He died intestate on 22 January 1701, and was buried in the choir of St. Mary, Warwick.

== Family ==
Lady Puckering, who died in 1689, was Elizabeth, daughter of Thomas Murray, and sister to Lady Anne Halkett. Puckering proved a great friend to Lady Halkett, lending her money before her marriage, and fighting a duel in Flanders with Colonel Joseph Bampfield, one of her suitors, who was suspected of having a wife still living (he was wounded in the hand). After Lady Puckering's death, Puckering forgave Lady Halkett all her debts to him. Thomas Fuller dedicated a section of his Church History to Henry, eldest son of Puckering, who died before his father.

As he left no issue the baronetcy became extinct, while the estate devolved by his own settlement upon his wife's niece Jane, daughter and coheiress of Henry Murray, groom of the bed-chamber to Charles II, and widow of Sir John Sir John Bowyer, 2nd Baronet of Knypersley, Staffordshire, for her life, with remainder to Vincent Grantham of Goltho, Lincolnshire.

== Notes ==
Parliament of England
Preceded by George Browne; Thomas Archer	Member of Parliament for Warwickshire; 1661–1679; With: Sir Robert Holte, Bt	Succeeded by Sir Edward Boughton, Bt; Robert Burdett
Preceded by Sir Francis Compton; Sir John Bowyer, Bt	Member of Parliament for Warwick; 1679; With: Sir John Clopton	Succeeded by Thomas Lucy; Richard Booth
Baronetage of England
Preceded by William Newton	Baronet (of Charlton); 1635–1701	Extinct
