= Master of Work to the Crown of Scotland =

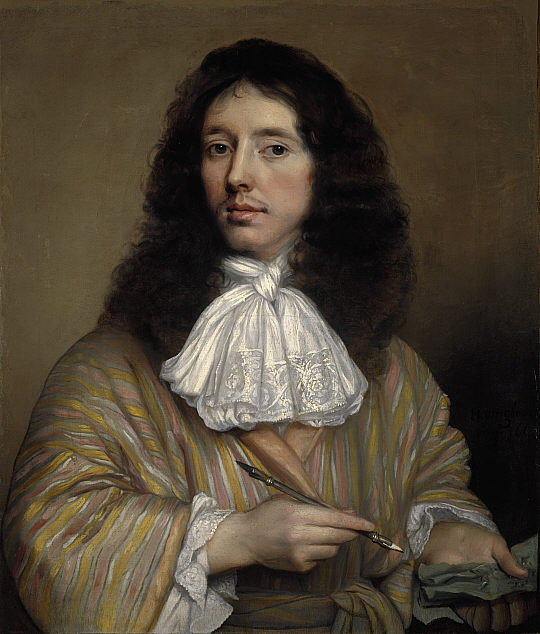
Sir William Bruce

The Master of Works to the Crown of Scotland was responsible for the construction, repair and maintenance of royal palaces, castles and other crown property in Scotland. The main buildings were; Holyroodhouse; Edinburgh Castle; Stirling Castle; Linlithgow Palace; and Falkland Palace. The position was roughly equivalent to that of Surveyor of the King's Works in the English Royal Household. The emergence of the position reflected a shift in responsibility from the masons, or administrators in holy orders, to designers with little hands-on knowledge of stonemasonry. Earlier holders of the office were often courtiers: James Hamilton of Finnart was the king's kinsman; John Scrymgeour was a heraldic expert; while William Schaw, an administrator, was a key figure in the development of Freemasonry, itself a 'craft' having little to do with building. Later holders filled a role similar to that of architects in the modern sense. Some Masters were craftsmen; Robert Robertson, who was master of work at Stirling Castle after the execution of the aristocrat Hamilton of Finnart, was a carpenter. During the reign of James V there was also a Principal Master Wright or carpenter, John Drummond of Milnab, and as well as building works he was concerned with the artillery and its logistics.

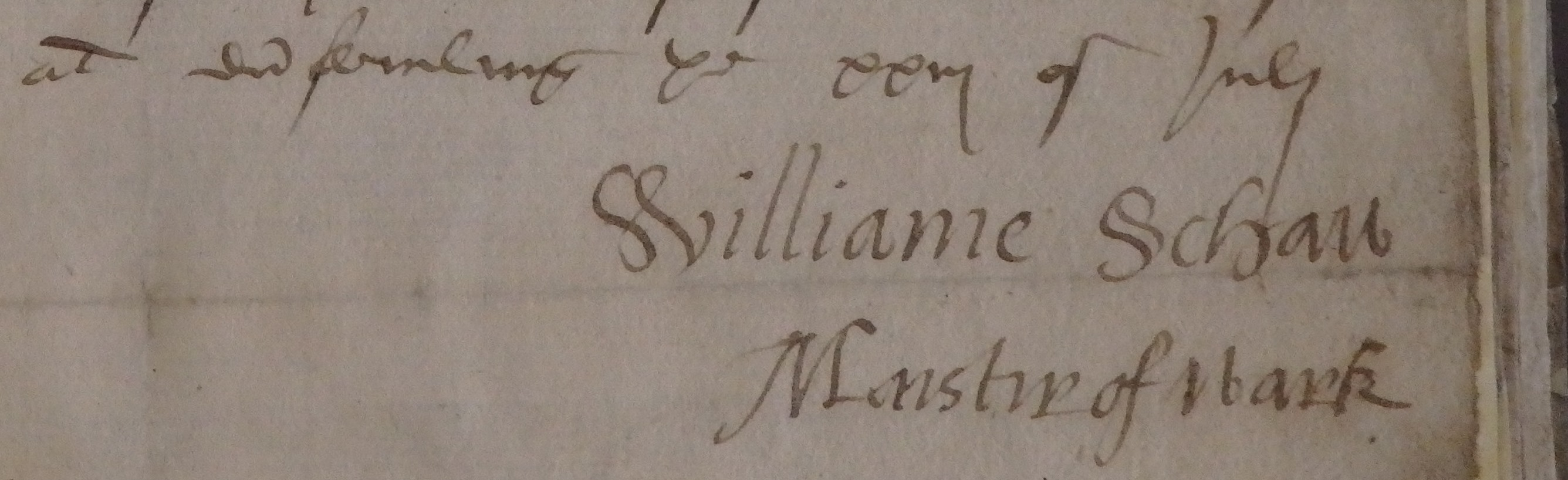
Signature of William Schaw (died 1602), Master of Work to King James VI and Anne of Denmark, National Records of Scotland

In the 15th century, a Master of Works would be appointed to oversee an individual construction project, such as a new palace, or a rebuilding of an old one. Thus the exchequer records identify several postholders who might be regarded as accountants rather than architects. In the 16th century, during the reign of James V, the appointment of a Principal Master of Works began, with overall responsibility for all the king's works. The appointment was usually for life. Following the death of James Smith in 1714, the post became a sinecure, with a salary of £400, and the post declined in importance. In 1808 Robert Reid was named Architect and Surveyor to the King in Scotland, and he became Master of Works following the death of James Brodie in 1824. However, in 1831 the Scottish Office of Works was merged with the English Office of Works, and when Reid retired in 1840, he was not replaced. The Office of Works was later reconstituted as the Ministry of Works.

== Accounts of the Masters of Work ==
The royal masters of work prepared financial accounts of their expenditure for audit by the Scottish exchequer. Accounts survive for the 16th and 17th centuries and are held by the National Records of Scotland. These records, and some of the treasury vouchers relating to building work, were published in two volumes in 1957 and 1982 by Her Majesty's Stationery Office as the Accounts of the Masters of Works for building and repairing Royal Palaces and Castles.

The accounts, written the Scots Language, record the names of structures and rooms, the components of doors and windows, joinery, and roofs, detail supplies including pigments, glue, and stone, and name craftsmen including the glazier Thomas Peebles, the mason Nicholas Roy, and the carver and metal worker Andrew Mansioun. Details of wages and some contracts made by the Masters of Work are included, notably for the work of the painter Valentine Jenkin at Stirling Castle.

== Sir William Moray ==
Sir William Moray of Dreghorn was a Scottish royal official, military officer, and administrator who served as Master of Works from August 1660 until his resignation on 15 October 1669 during the early Restoration reign of Charles II. He was the younger brother of Robert Moray, a diplomat, natural philosopher, and founding figure of the Royal Society. William Moray occupied an important but relatively obscure place within the political and administrative reconstruction of Restoration Scotland. Like his brother Robert, he appears to have possessed a military background. Contemporary records referred to him in 1661 as "Lieutenant Colonel William Murray." His appointment as Master of Works was strongly tied to the influence of his brother Robert Moray, who wrote in August 1660 that "I think my Brother will be master of Work," a position he then obtained the same month.

The office of Master of Works was one of the principal administrative and architectural offices of the Scottish crown. The role extended far beyond architecture in the modern sense, combining responsibility for royal building works, military engineering, procurement, construction oversight, logistics, and supervision of craftsmen and masons employed by the crown. As Master of Works, Moray exercised authority over the royal works establishment, including the King's Master Mason. Contemporary records concerning the appointment of Robert Mylne clarified that Mylne was to operate "under" the Master of Works and subject to his "charge and commandment over all masons."

Moray played a role in the early Restoration rebuilding of royal authority in Scotland after the political and military upheavals of the Wars of the Three Kingdoms and the Cromwellian occupation. On 26 November 1661, the Privy Council of Scotland instructed Moray to report on the condition of Holyrood Palace, whose structures had suffered neglect, alteration, and damage during the Interregnum period. Moray resigned as Master of Works on 15 October 1669 under circumstances later described by historians as obscure or mysterious. He was succeeded within the broader architectural world of Restoration Scotland by William Bruce, who would go on to dominate Scottish architecture during the later reign of Charles II.

== Principal Masters of Works to the Crown of Scotland ==
The dates given are those of their appointment. These appointments were made by the issue of a warrant recorded in the Register of the Privy Seal. William MacDowall, though acting as master of work never had a warrant, and some appointments ran concurrently.

- 1529: Sir James Nycholay, or Nicolson, Master of Work at Stirling Castle.
- 1537: John Scrymgeour
- 1539: Sir James Hamilton of Finnart
- 1541: Robert Robertson (Principal master wright in Stirling Castle)
- 1543: John Hamilton of Milnburn
- 1579: Sir Robert Drummond of Carnock
- 1583: William Schaw.
- 1602–1607: Sir David Cunningham of Robertland, also Surveyor of the King's Works in England, 1604–1606.
- 1607–1634: Sir James Murray of Kilbaberton

- 1615: Walter Murray (Assistant Master of Works)

- 1629–1637: Sir Anthony Alexander

- 1632: William Govane of Cardrona and James Murray Jr. (Assistant Masters of Works)

- 1637–1641: Henry Alexander, 3rd Earl of Stirling
- 1641: Sir John Veitch of Dawyck
- 1643–1644: John Carmichael
- 1645–1649: Sir David Carmichael of Hyndford
- 1649: Sir Robert Montgomery
- 1660–1668: Sir William Moray of Dreghorn

The office was unoccupied from 1668–1671.

- 1671–1678: Sir William Bruce of Balcaskie, Baronet
- 1678–1683: David Maitland (acting Master of Works)
- 1683–1788: James Smith
- 1689–1700: Sir Archibald Murray of Blackbarony, Baronet
- 1700–1704: James Scott of Logie
- 1704–1705: Sir Francis Scott of Thirlestane
- 1705–1714: John Campbell of Mamor
- 1705–1717: John Urquhart of Meldrum
- 1707–1714: James Smith (position renewed)
- 1717–1743: Sir John Anstruther of Anstruther
- 1743–1761: George Dundas
- 1761–1764: William Stewart of Hartwood
- 1764–1768: James Duff, of the Middle Temple, London
- 1768–1809: Lieutenant-Colonel James Pringle
- 1809–1824: James Brodie of Brodie
- 1824–1840: Robert Reid
