= Anne Halkett =

English religious writer and autobiographer

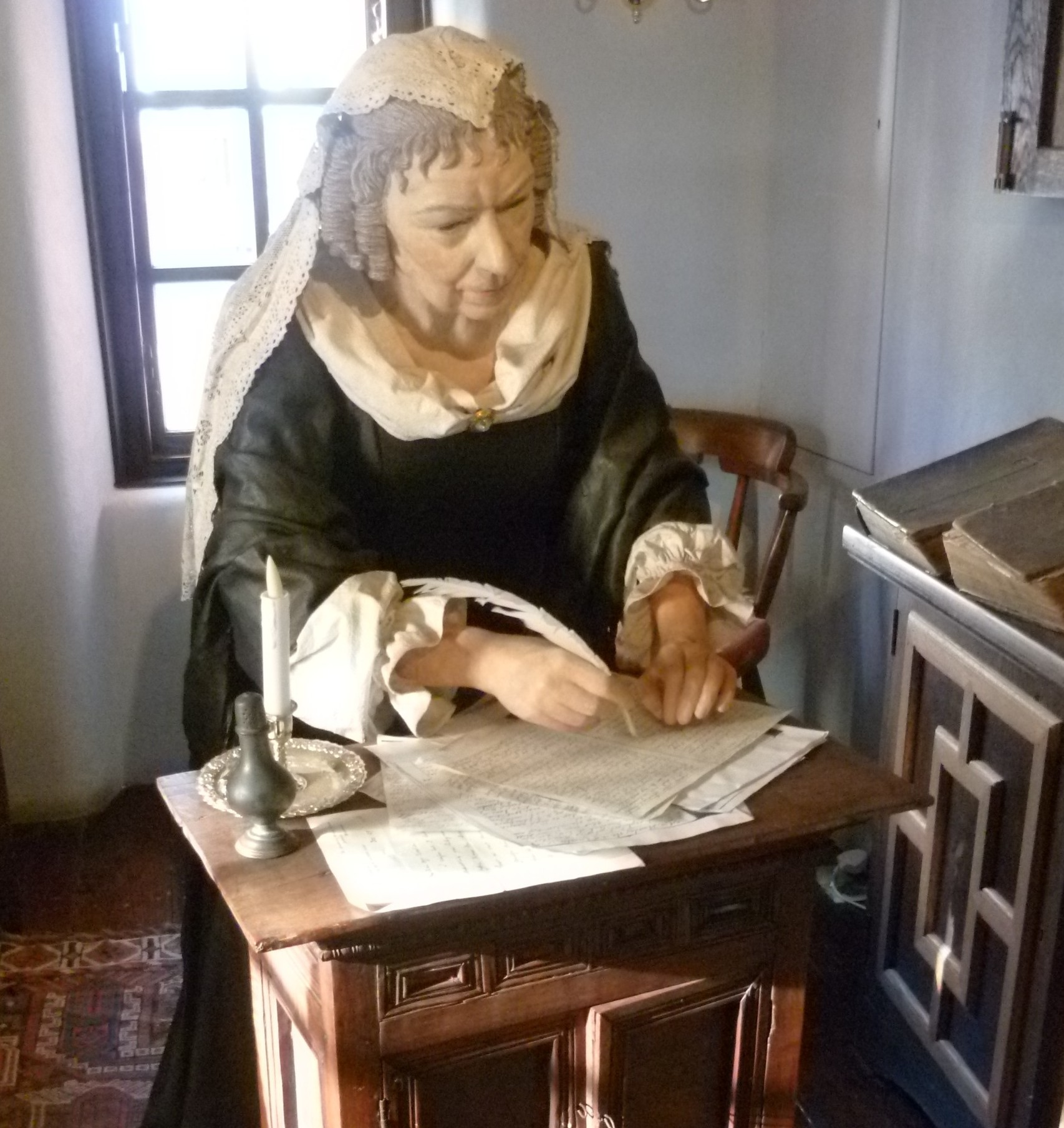
- A figure of Lady Anne Halkett figure at the Abbot House, Dunfermline
- Born: c. 1623; England
- Died: c. 1699 (aged 75-78)
- Occupations: Writer and autobiographer
- Years active: 1644–1699
- Spouse: Sir James Halkett (m. 1656)
- Parents: Thomas Murray (father); Jane Drummond Murray (mother)

Anne Halkett (née Murray) (c. 1623 – 1699), also known as Lady Halkett, was an English religious writer and autobiographer.

== Early life ==
Halkett's father Thomas Murray was tutor to King James I's children. He later became Provost of Eton College. Her mother, Jane Drummond Murray, was governess to the king's children. When Thomas Murray died, Halkett was educated by her mother. She learned French, dancing, medicine, music, needlework, religion and surgery. Her religious education was extensive, and she read the Bible, said daily prayers and regularly attended church. In 1639 Dr Robert Johnstone, a friend of the jeweller George Heriot, bequeathed her a diamond ring.

== Personal life ==
Halkett's first romantic relationship was with Thomas Howard. Although Howard was from a distinguished family, he was not wealthy. This meant that marriage between them would be economically damaging to both families. Halkett's emotions were caught between the economic difficulties the marriage would result in, and the pain and loss of credibility that Howard would suffer if she did not marry him. To prevent Halkett from making an imprudent decision, her mother guarded her by having another person sleep in Halkett's room and forbidding her from seeing Howard again. Rather than disobey her mother, Halkett said goodbye to him while wearing a blindfold. Her relationship with Howard created a rift between her and her mother that lasted for fourteen months. Although Howard vowed never to marry another woman, he later broke this promise. Halkett reported in her writing that his marriage was known to be unhappy.

Halkett had a relationship with the Royalist Colonel Joseph Bampfield. She collaborated with him in several daring manoeuvres on behalf of the Royalist cause during the English Civil War. They rescued James, Duke of York, (who later became James II) from Parliamentary captivity. Halkett disguised him as a woman to effect his escape to continental Europe, commenting in her autobiography that he "was very pretty in it." She then gave him something to eat and sent him to safety on the continent with a special cake which she knew he liked. Halkett seems to have lived with Bampfield under the promise of marriage. However, Bampfield had been pretending to be a widower and Halkett later learned that his wife was alive.

Halkett came to Scotland and met King Charles at Dunfermline Palace. She practised medicine in Scotland, at Kinross and at Fyvie Castle where she stayed with Countess of Dunfermline. Bampfield came to see her at Fyvie.

In June 1652, she stayed a few days at Floors Castle with the Countess of Roxburghe. On her return to Edinburgh she stayed with Sophia Lindsay, the pregnant wife of Sir Robert Moray in Lord Tweeddale's house in the Canongate. Sophia Lindsay died in childbirth a few days after Christmas. In February, Anne Murray moved to a lodging in Blackfriar's Wynd.

She later became a governess in the household of Sir James Halkett, a widower with two daughters. They were married in 1656 at Charlton House, the service was conducted in Henry Newton's closet by Mr Robert Gale, the chaplain of Christian Cavendish, Countess of Devonshire.

Halkett was happily married to Sir James for 20 years. During her first pregnancy she wrote The Mother's Will to her Unborn Child. When he died she was left with insufficient funds to support her family, and made her living by teaching children of nobility in her home. Her financial difficulties eased when James II provided her with a pension for her services to him during the English Civil War.

When she died, Halkett left behind 21 folio and quarto manuscript volumes that had been written between 1644 and the late 1690s. These manuscripts are now housed in the National Library of Scotland.

== Written work ==
Halkett's writings include an extensive autobiography (c. 1677), religious meditations, and Instructions for Youth. For Halkett, writing about what she had read, her dreams, and her hopes for her children were a part of her daily domestic devotions as well as for pleasure. Her religious writings seem to have been composed over a fifty-five-year period (1644–99).

Halkett's autobiography (which can be titled as Autobiography or Memoirs, depending on the editor) is a candid record of personal and political events during the English Civil War. It appears to have been written between 1677 and 1678. In it, Halkett gives a detailed account of her courtships and marriage. It is written with narrative suspense, and dialogue is used to capture both Halkett's own emotions and those of her lovers.

== Bibliography ==
- Instructions for Youth: For the Use of those young Noblemen and Gentleman, whose Education was committed to her Care. (1701)
- Meditations on the twentieth and fifth Psalm (1701)
- Meditations upon the seven gifts of the Holy Spirit, mentioned Isaiah XI. 2, 3. As also, meditations upon Jabez his request, ... Together with sacramental meditations on the Lords Supper; and prayers, pious reflections and observations. (1702)
- John Gough Nichols ed, The Autobiography of Anne Lady Halkett (Camden Society London, 1875)
- Memoirs of Anne, Lady Halkett, and Ann, Lady Fanshawe (1979)
