= Sir Henry Gibb, 1st Baronet =

Scottish courtier

Sir Henry Gibb, 1st Baronet (died 8 April 1650) was a Scottish courtier.

== Family background ==
Gibb was the son of John Gibb (or Gib) of Knock and Isobel Lyndsay. His grandfather Robert Gibb had been a servant of James V of Scotland.

== Career ==
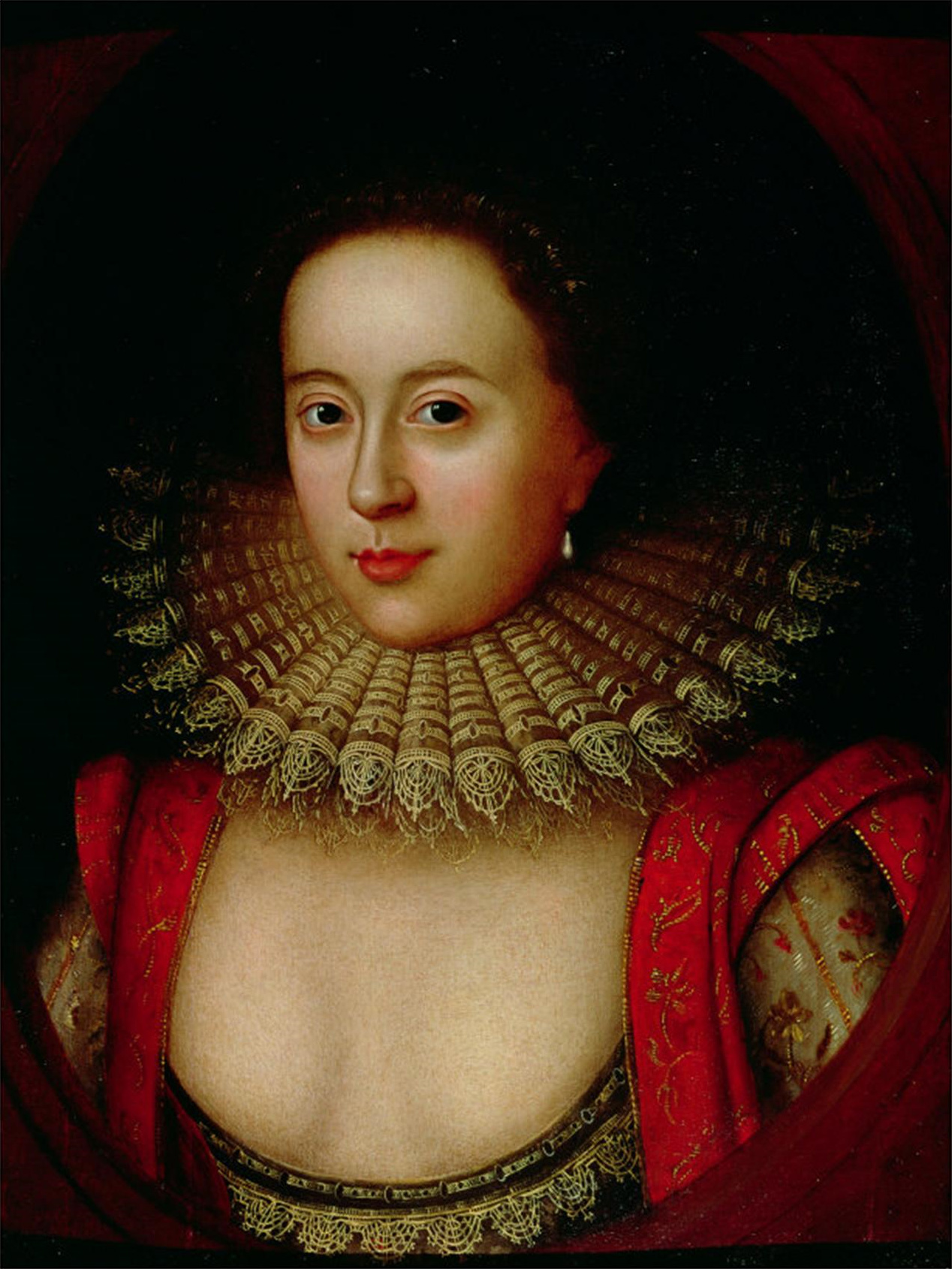
Frances Howard

He became a Groom of the Bedchamber to Prince Henry by 1606. At the Prince's death in 1612, he was briefly suspected of disposing of the Prince's personal papers. Despite this suspicion, he became a Gentleman of the bedchamber to James VI and I.

In September 1613 he was commissioned by King James to conduct a special mission to the Low Countries. Henry Gibb and Mr May travelled to Veere and Sluis to prevent Henry Howard, a son of the Earl of Suffolk fighting a duel with the Earl of Essex over issues concerning his sister Frances Howard and the annulment of her marriage.

=== Gibb and the Earl of Somerset ===
Henry Gibb was a friend of the Scottish favourite, Robert Carr, 1st Earl of Somerset. Somerset helped Henry Gibb obtain his position in the king's bedchamber. Somerset's former friend Thomas Overbury resented this.

Gibb was involved in an incident in 1615 connected with the fall of the Earl of Somerset, who had married Frances Howard. Gibb passed a letter and message from a Scottish man called Lumsden to Anne of Denmark's servant, his kinswoman Elizabeth Schaw, Mrs Murray. The letter misrepresented the trial of Weston, an officer at the Tower of London. The letter caused some offence to Anne of Denmark and difficulties for Scottish courtiers including Schaw's husband John Murray of the Bedchamber. The Countess of Eglinton heard about the affair and she wrote to the Murrays about Somerset, who she described as an "errant liar", who "wret to you and message sent with that ungret fullich cousing of yours, Herie Gib". Gibb lost his place at court for a while.

An early biographer of King James, Arthur Wilson, included a version of these events, saying the letter or message carried by Henry Gibb was intended for King James. The letter from Lumsden described the actions of Richard Weston, the keeper of the Tower of London, and was critical of the lawyer Edward Coke. Francis Bacon said it was a libel and slander.

After the fall of Somerset, Gibb had custody of some of his tapestries and paintings including portraits of the Howard family of Norfolk. The schedule of these goods dated 1619, held by the Bedford Estate Office, is probably connected with a grant to Sir Thomas Howard, Robert Kerr, and Gibb, as executors of property forfeited by Somerset on his attainder on 24 June 1619.

=== Later years ===
Gibb was at Theobalds during the final illness of King James in 1625. Mary Villiers, Countess of Buckingham and the Duke of Buckingham arranged some medical treatments for James, which caused controversy. Gibb criticised the Duke of Buckingham and was forced to leave court.

Gibb later served in the court of Charles I of England. In June 1634 Gibb was created a baronet, of Falkland and Carriber in the Baronetage of Nova Scotia. His title became extinct or dormant upon his death in 1650.

== Family ==
Henry Gibb married Annie Gibbs, a daughter of Sir Ralph Gibbs of Honington and Gertrude, daughter of Sir Thomas Wroughton of Broad Hinton.

Baronetage of Nova Scotia
New creation	Baronet (of Falkland and Carriber); 1634–1650	Extinct
