= John Gibb (courtier) =

Scottish landowner and courtier

John Gibb of Knock and Carribber (c.1550–1628) was a Scottish landowner and courtier.

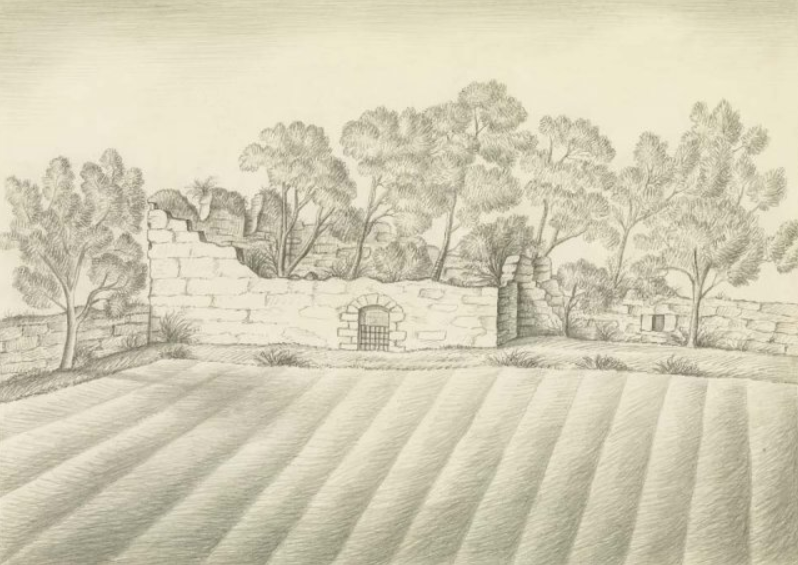
Carribber Castle, drawn by Alexander Archer, May 1837

He was a son of Robert Gibb and Elizabeth Schaw. His mother is sometimes said to have been the Elizabeth Schaw who a mistress of James V of Scotland and mother of James Stewart, Commendator of Kelso, but she died in 1536. He was however a kinsman of the Master of Work, William Schaw and Elizabeth Schaw, Countess of Annandale.

His home, Carribber, is near Linlithgow. His other residence was Knock, in Fife, close to the present day Knockhill Racing Circuit. The surname was often spelled "Gib".

== Court life ==
Robert Gibb of Carribber served James V of Scotland as Esquire of the Stable.

John Gibb was a valet ot varlet of the chamber of James VI of Scotland from 1576. In February 1580 he was paid for supplying tennis balls to the royal tennis court, called the "catchepule". The tennis court for James VI at Stirling Castle had been constructed from timber in June 1576.

In October 1582 he met Walter Keyre at Leith, a messenger from the Duke of Lennox who was staying at Rothesay Castle, displaced from his favour at court by the Gowrie Regime. James VI spoke to Gibb privately about the meeting in the "stole" or garderobe at Holyrood Palace. The English ambassador Robert Bowes heard the king advise Gibb that the Duke and Keyre ought not to endanger themselves by sending messages. The story suggests that at this time Gibb's role was similar to the Groom of the Stool at the Tudor court.

In November 1584 he was made keeper of the palace and yards of Dunfermline, which became a special residence of Anne of Denmark. He had a yearly pension of £100 paid from the Dunfermline estate. The Master of Gray hoped Gibb would be his agent at court in August 1586.

Gibb travelled with James VI to Norway and Denmark, and with his fellow valet William Stewart was recorded making payments and gifts of Danish dalers from the queen's dowry, and settling the king's losses at card games. In August 1591, Gibb was given £240 Scots to spend on livery clothes allowances given to Danish courtiers returning home.

John and other members of the Gibb family, and Willam Schaw, signed a band in June 1590 as cautioners in support of a James Gibb who had fought illegally with James Boyd of Kippis in Edinburgh in a family feud. His death sentence was converted to banishment.

=== Masterton ===
In 1592 he was rewarded with the gift of the rents of Masterton to him and his son James, "remembering the long good true and faithful service done to his majesty as well in his highness' minority as majority by his grace's daily servitor John Gib one of the varlets in his graces chamber." In 1593 James gave him a property in Edinburgh. The lands at Masterton were given to Anne of Denmark in 1593, as part of the settlement of her morrowing gift of Dunfermline lands, and Gibb was compensated with an income of cereal produce from Cockburnspath.

== Royal textiles and jewels ==
On 25 April 1584 John Gibb delivered a royal jewel, a tablet or locket with a diamond and an emerald, in a case, to Alexander Clark of Balbirnie, Provost of Edinburgh, as a pledge for a loan of 6,000 merks or £4,000 Scots. In October 1589 the Provost John Arnot formally gave the jewel back to the king as a marriage gift. It was delivered by Clerk's (future) son-in-law John Provand to William Fairlie, who commissioned the goldsmith David Gilbert to upgrade and refashion it, and it was presented to Anne of Denmark during her Entry to Edinburgh in May 1590.

Gibb was in charge of jewels in the king's use, and in October 1584 transferred several pieces to the keeping of the Master of the Wardrobe, Patrick, Master of Gray. Some of the jewels had recently been in the possession of Colonel William Stewart. One tablet or locket had been a gift from the Laird of Rosyth. A little hat badge with diamonds and sparks of rubies was a recent present from Queen Elizabeth. A diamond cross was one of the jewels of Mary, Queen of Scots.

The grooms and valets of the chamber were also in charge of the king's linen. In October 1590 he was paid for ruffs, napkins, shirts, caps called "mutches", and sheets supplied to the king since 1588. These were embroidered with gold and silver thread and edges with "shorn work". His sister, Elspeth or Elizabeth Gibb made the shirts and ruffs. In 1591 linen was delivered to Gibb for the cuffs "handis" and "neckis" of the king's shirts, and in August he provided livery clothes for Danish servants of Anne of Denmark who were returning home. The treasurer's accounts for May 1599 list textiles in the keeping of Gibb and George Murray, including linen for shirts, cuffs, bands, bedsheets, tablecloths, night-caps to be embroidered with gold and red and blue silks, napkins, and a taffeta pocket or bag of powder to scent the linen chest. Gibb's sister Elizabeth had a similar role in Anne of Denmark's household. John Tennent had performed a similar role for James V in the 1530s.

In August 1591 Gibb was given £240 to buy clothes for Danish servants of Anne of Denmark who were returning home. The king also bought clothes for John Gibb, including in February 1591 a cloak of black Naples taffeta, and a black satin doublet with black velvet breeches.

== Letters and messages at court ==
John Gibb continued as a servant in the bedchamber in England after the Union of the Crowns. On 24 October Gibb, John Auchmoutie, John Murray, and George Murray, grooms of the bedchamber were given winter clothing. Gibb was the messenger who brought reprieves from the death sentence for Markham, Grey, and Cobham at Winchester on 9 November 1603. According to Dudley Carleton, Gibb had some difficulty making his way to the Sheriff at the place of execution and had to shout to save Markham's life. Gibb gave the king's warrant for the stay of executions to Sir Benjamin Tichborne.

As a member of the king's chamber Gibb was able to forward the business of petitioners. In 1607 Maurice Peeters complained to Robert Cecil that his plan for reforming the manufacture of fabrics in England made from Persian bombazine cotton without wool, and his patent for silk dyeing had been forwarded by Gibb, but then Gibb took it up with other partners and promoted it to the king, to the loss, Peeters claimed, of Cecil and Anne of Denmark. Gibb was involved with a dispute over property with the Earl of Wigtown in 1613.

=== Henry Gibb ===
His younger son Henry Gibb also had a bedchamber position. He was first a groom of the bedchamber to Prince Henry. John Gibb obtained the lands of Kilcroft and Carriber and transferred them to Henry Gibb. In September 1613 Henry Gibb and Mr May travelled to Veere and Sluis to prevent Henry Howard, a son of the Earl of Suffolk fighting a duel with the Earl of Essex over issues concerning his sister Frances Howard and the annulment of her marriage.

Young Gibb was part of an incident in 1615 connected with the fall of the Scottish favourite, Robert Carr, 1st Earl of Somerset, who had married Frances Howard. He passed a letter and message from a Scottish man called Lumsden to Anne of Denmark's servant, his kinswoman Elizabeth Schaw, Mrs Murray. The letter misrepresented the trial of Weston, an officer at the Tower of London. The letter caused the queen offence and difficulties for Scottish courtiers including Schaw's husband John Murray of the Bedchamber. The Countess of Eglinton heard about the affair and she wrote to the Murrays about Somerset, who she described as the "errant liar", who "wret to you and message sent with that ungret fullich cousing of yours, Herie Gib." He lost his place at court for a while.

The early biographer of King James Arthur Wilson has a version of these events, saying the letter or message carried by Henry Gibb was intended for King James. Lumsden's letter described the actions of Richard Weston, the keeper of the Tower of London, and was critical of the lawyer Edward Coke. Francis Bacon said it was a libel and slander.

=== John Gibb humiliated at court ===
In April 1616 John Gibb was questioned with Sir Robert Kerr about missing letters and documents and they were placed in the custody of Sir James Fullerton. According to an old story, at Theobalds in 1622 the king had misplaced some papers relating to a Spanish treaty, and became angry and frustrated, and insisted that John Gibb had them. Gibb threw himself on the floor saying he had never had the papers, and James kicked him. Gibb abandoned his humility and said wouldn't put up with it any more, and rode away to London. Endymion Porter hearing of this remembered he had the documents. James sent messengers to bring Gibb back to Theobalds and kneeled in front of his servant to beg forgiveness. The incident was an illustration of the imbalance in the king's humours for the biographer Arthur Wilson.

Thomas Middleton made this affair into a stage play as The Nice Valour (the play has historically been attributed to Francis Beaumont and John Fletcher), in which the Duke whips a courtier, Shamont, in the face, but later apologises and devotes himself to justice. The scene would read as a compliment to the king.

In 1618 John Taylor, the Water Poet, came to Dunfermline and lodged at John Gibb's house, presumably part of the palace. Taylor said Gibb, who was not there, was "the oldest servant the king hath." A Mr Crighton showed Taylor around the palace.

=== Death ===
He died on 6 February 1628 and was buried in Dunfermline Abbey churchyard.

The satirist Anthony Weldon listed Gibb as a Scottish courtier who deservedly received rewards from King James, among "private gentlemen; as Gideon Murray, John Achmoty, James Baily, John Gib, and Barnard Lindley, got some pretty estate, not worth either the naming or enjoying; old servants should get some moderate estate to leave to posterity".

== Family and children ==
John Gibb married Isobella Lindsay. Their children included:

- James Gibb of Carriber, who married Egidia Abercromby. He was made a denizen of England in 1610 and granted lands in Ireland in Fermanagh.
- Henry Gibb, servant to Prince Henry, and servant to James VI and I in the bedchamber. In 1616 he received a grant of land to be reclaimed from the sea at Brading on the Isle of Wight. He was knighted at Hampton Court on 26 September 1624.
- John Gibb
- Bernard Gibb, who married Euphame Abercromby.

John Gibb's sister, Elizabeth Gibb, married the king's tutor Peter Young in 1577. She became a gentlewoman in the household of Anna of Denmark and made head coverings and veils for riding for the queen.

A Thomas Gibb was recorded as a servant of Anne of Denmark in September 1601 when his daughter Isobel was baptised at Dunfermline.
