= Abbot of Dundrennan =

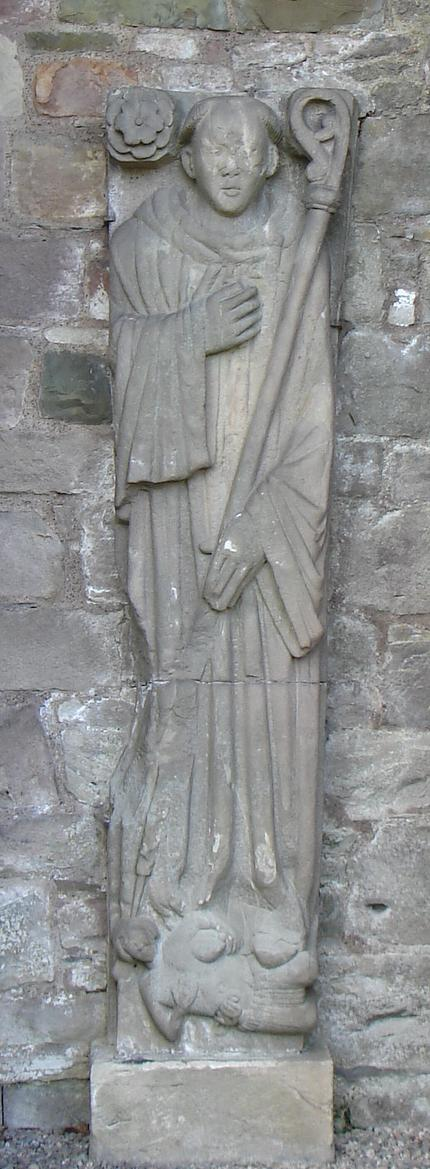
Effigy of an early 13th-century abbot of Dundrennan

The Abbot of Dundrennan was the head of the Cistercian monastic community of Dundrennan Abbey, Galloway. It was founded by Fergus of Galloway in 1142. Dundrennan was a large and powerful monastery in the context of the south-west. It became secularised and protestantised in the 16th century. In 1606 it was finally turned into a secular lordship in for John Murray of Lochmaben, afterwards earl of Annandale.

The royal warrant in 1886 which revived the office of Dean of the Chapel Royal also gave the Dean the titles of Abbot of Crossraguel and Abbot of Dundrennan.

The following is a list of abbots and commendators:

== List of abbots ==
- Silvanus, fl. 1167
- William, 1180
- Nicholas, 1196 x 1200
- [? Egidius], fl. 13th century
- Gaufridus (Geoffrey), 1209 x 1222
- Robert Matursal, 1223 x 1224
- Jordan, 1236
- Leonius, 1236–1239
- Ricardus (Richard), 1239
- Adam I, 1250
- Brian, 1250–1273
- Adam II, 1294
- Walter, 1296
- John, 1305
- William, 1332
- Giles, 1347 - 1358 x 1381
- Thomas, 1381
- Patrick MacMen, x 1426
- Thomas de Levinstone, 1429
- Patrick Maligussal [Maxwell], 1431
- Thomas de Levinstone (again), x1440-1454
  - Alexander Brady, 1441
  - John Hunter, 1441
- William Lowierii (Lilburn), 1454–1472
- John Fuogo [Fogo], c. 1473-1476
- Alexander Pettigrew, x 1474-1479
- John Lockhart, 1476
- Hugh Foulis, 1479
- William Bewister, 1485
- Edward Story (Edward Meldrum), 1488–1515
  - Robert Hunter, 1490
- James Hay, 1516-1524
  - John Dingwall, 1518
  - Adam Symson, 1518
  - Edward Bangal, 1519
- John Maxwell, fl. 1524
- Cristofer Boyd, fl. 1526-1527

== List of commendators ==
- Henry Wemyss, 1529-1541
- Adam Blackadder, 1541–1562
- Edward Maxwell, 1562–1599
- John Murray of Lochmaben, 1599–1606

== Bibliography ==
- Thompson, Barbara, "Monks and Other Officers of Dundrennan", (Dundrennan Abbey; unpublished)
- Watt, D.E.R. & Shead, N.F. (eds.), The Heads of Religious Houses in Scotland from the 12th to the 16th Centuries, The Scottish Records Society, New Series, Volume 24, (Edinburgh, 2001), pp. 63–7
