= Thomas Livingston =

Thomas Livingston(e) may refer to:

- Thomas Livingston (bishop) (1390/91–1460), Scottish cleric, diplomat, and bishop of Dunkeld
- Thomas Livingston (politician) (1851–1922), Australian politician.
- Thomas Livingston (Royal Navy officer) (1769–1853), Scottish Royal Navy officer
- Thomas Livingstone, 1st Viscount Teviot (c. 1651–1711), Dutch-born army officer
- Thomas Livingstone (cricketer) (1889–1956), New Zealand cricketer
