= Carribber Castle =

Castle in West Lothian, Scotland

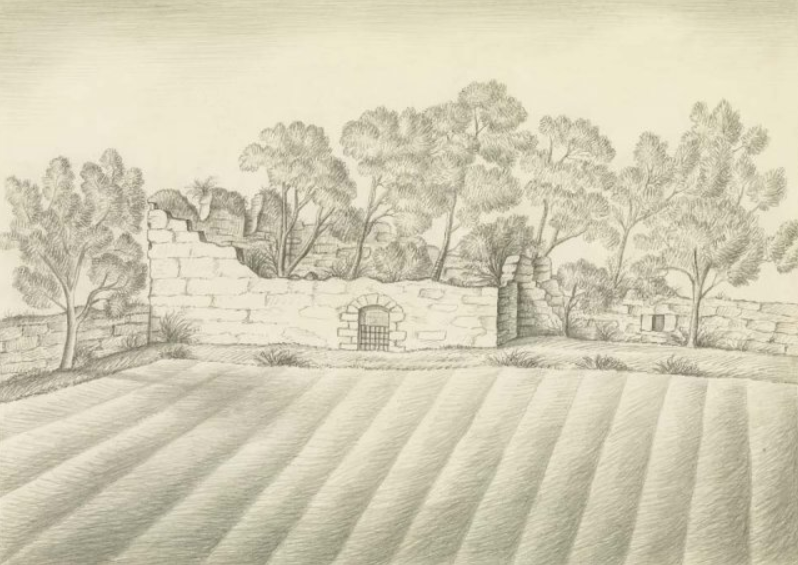
- Carribber Castle 1837

- Location within West Lothian
- 55.95833°N 3.658139°W
- OS grid reference: NS 96574 75162

History
- Built: 16th century
- Built for: Rob Gibb

Carribber Castle, also known as Carriber Castle or Rob Gibb's Castle, is a ruined castle located near Linlithgow in West Lothian, Scotland.

== Description ==
It is a 16th-century tower house castle, now ruined. The castle had a number of small buildings and courtyards. A square courtyard to the north is now covered in vegetation. A doorway is present in the west wall, thought to be no earlier than the 17th century. To the south is a rectangular range, possibly originally stables. The remaining walls are only 2.5 feet (0.76 m) feet thick, averaging 8 feet (2.4 m) tall, though are higher in places. The ruin is believed to have been intentionally knocked down.

== History ==
Rob Gibb (1490–1558) inherited the lands from this father, also called Rob Gibb (sometimes spelled as Gyb), in 1541. The lands subsequently went to John Gibb (c.1550–1628), and then to his son Henry Gibb. It was later passed to the Hays in 1710 and eventually the Blairs of Avonton.
