= William Schaw =

Scottish mason and Master of Works

William Schaw (c. 1550–1602) was Master of Works to James VI of Scotland and Anne of Denmark for building castles and palaces, and was an important figure in the development of Freemasonry in Scotland.

== Early life ==
William Schaw was the second son of John Schaw of Broich, and grandson of Sir James Schaw of Sauchie. Broich is now called Arngomery, a place at Kippen in Stirlingshire. The Schaw family had links to the Royal Court, principally through being keepers of the King's wine cellar. The Broich family was involved in a scandal in 1560, when John Schaw was accused of murdering the servant of another laird. William's father was denounced as a rebel and his property forfeited when he and his family failed to appear at court, but the family were soon re-instated. At this time William Schaw may have been a page at the court of Mary of Guise, as a page of that name received an outfit of black mourning cloth when Mary of Guise died. William the page would have been in Edinburgh Castle with the Regent's court during the siege of Leith, while the Master of Work, William MacDowall, was strengthening the castle's defences. John Schaw of Broich was appointed as chamberlain of the lands of Kelso Abbey in August 1566.

== Career ==
The name "William Schaw" appears in a satirical note about courtiers made by an informant or spy at the royal court in 1580, the letter was sent to England. Schaw was described as the "clock-keeper" amongst followers of the King's favourite Esmé Stewart, 1st Duke of Lennox, while another man, the master hunter, John Hume was the keeper of "ratches", an old word meaning a kind of tenacious hunting scent hound.

Schaw signed the negative confession whereby courtiers pledged allegiance to the Scottish Reformation. On 11 April 1581, he was given a valuable gift of rights over the lands in Kippen belonging to the Grahams of Fintry. In May 1583, he was in Paris at the death of the exiled Esmé Stewart and it was said that he took Esmé's heart back to Scotland.

=== Great Master of Work ===
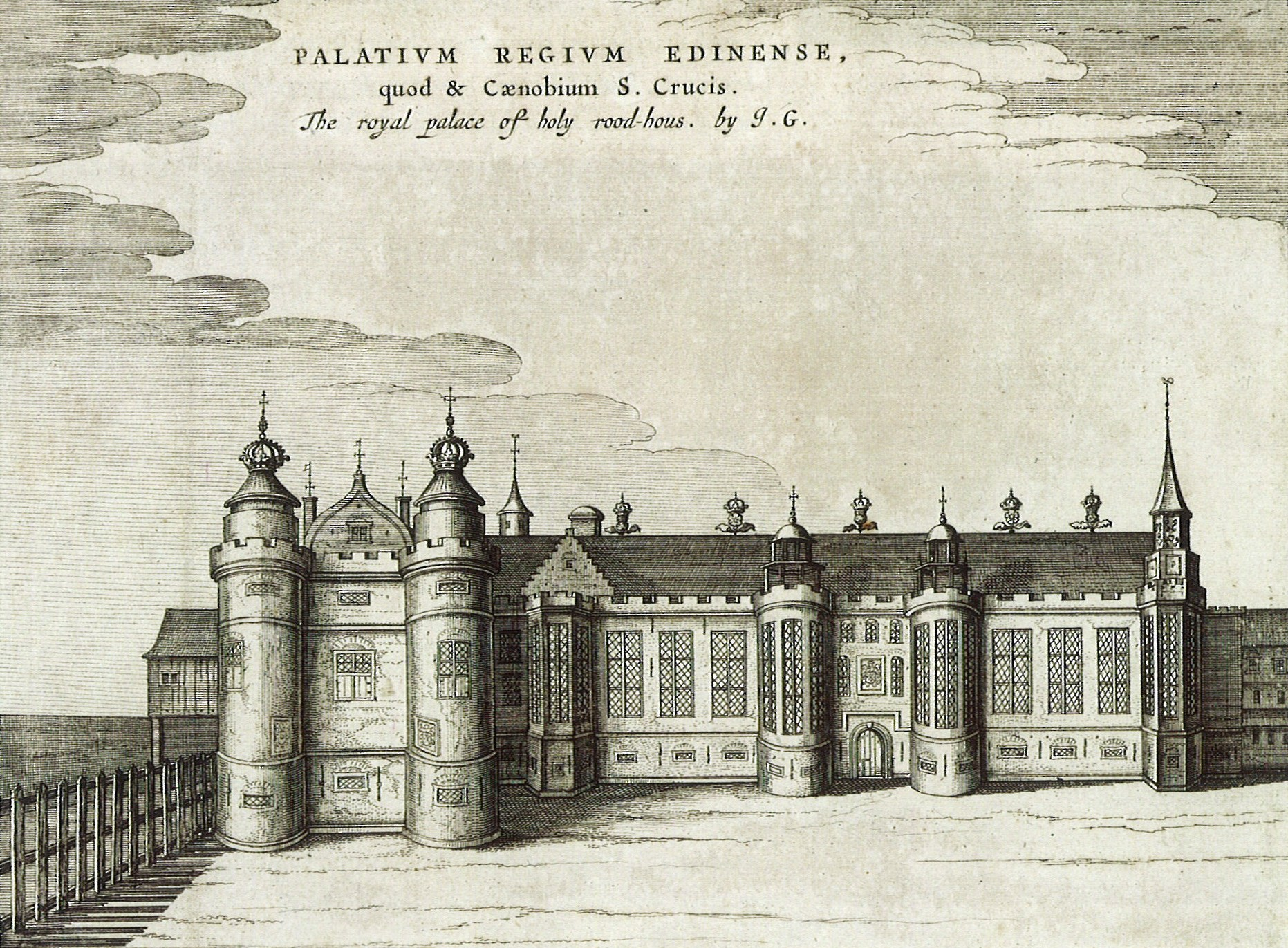
William Schaw organised repairs to the steeple and clock at Holyroodhouse shown to right in this engraving.

On 21 December 1583, James VI appointed Schaw principal Maister o' Wark (Master of Work) to the Crown of Scotland for life, with responsibility for all royal castles and palaces. Schaw had already been paid the first instalment of his salary £166-13s–4d as "grete Mr of wark in place of Sir Robert Drummond" in November. The replacement of the incumbent Robert Drummond of Carnock with Schaw, known as a Roman Catholic, may have been a reaction to the Ruthven Raid that had removed Lennox from power. By the terms of his appointment, Schaw for the rest of his life was to be;

Grit maister of wark of all and sindrie his hienes palaceis, biggingis and reparationis, and greit oversear, directour and commander of quhatsumevir police devysit or to be devysit for our soverane lordis behuif and plessur

(In modern spelling) Great master of work of all and sundry his highness' palaces, building works and repairs, and great overseer, director and commander of whatsoever policy devised or to be devised for our sovereign lord's behalf and pleasure.

In November 1583, Schaw travelled on a diplomatic trip to France with Lord Seton and his son Alexander Seton, a fellow Catholic with an interest in architecture. The Seton family remained supporters of Mary, Queen of Scots who was exiled in England. Schaw returned in the winter of 1584, and was involved in building work for the Seton family. In 1585, he was one of three courtiers who entertained three Danish ambassadors visiting the Scottish court at Dunfermline and St Andrews. In 1588 Schaw was amongst a group of Catholics ordered to appear before the Edinburgh Presbytery, and English agents reported him as being a suspected Jesuit and holding anti-English views during the 1590s. He met an English Catholic, George More at Dalkeith Palace in September 1598.

In September 1591 Richard Cockburn of Clerkington was admitted as a Lord of Session. According to the English ambassador Robert Bowes, Cockburn had been "Master of Ceremonies" and this office was transferred to William Schaw. These appointments followed the death of Lewis Bellenden. An account of the baptism and banquet for Prince Charles on 23 December 1600 mentions that Schaw was absent, and the role of Master of Ceremonies was taken by two other men.

In May 1596 an English paper listing reasons to suspect James VI of being himself a Roman Catholic, included the appointment of known Catholics to household offices, noting Schaw as 'Praefectum Architecturae,' his friend Alexander Seton as President of Council, and Lord Hume as the King's body guard. By this time he had acquired the barony of Sauchie.

Some payments for Schaw's building work, at Falkland Palace and Stirling Castle are documented by exchequer vouchers in the National Records of Scotland. A record of the building work at the Palace of Holyroodhouse he supervised in 1599 survives. The works involved masons, slaters, plumbers, and joiners making repairs to the court and the king's kitchens, the steeple and clock, and the King's billiard table, and other alterations to the palace. Schaw signed off the account weekly with his name, or as "Maistir of Wark". On 8 July 1601, James VI sent Schaw to consult with Master John Gordon on the construction of a monument to the King's rescue from the Gowrie House conspiracy the previous year. James VI wrote to Gordon that William would "conferre with yow thairanent, that ye maye agree upon the forme, devyse, and superscriptionis".

=== Arrival of Anne of Denmark in Scotland ===
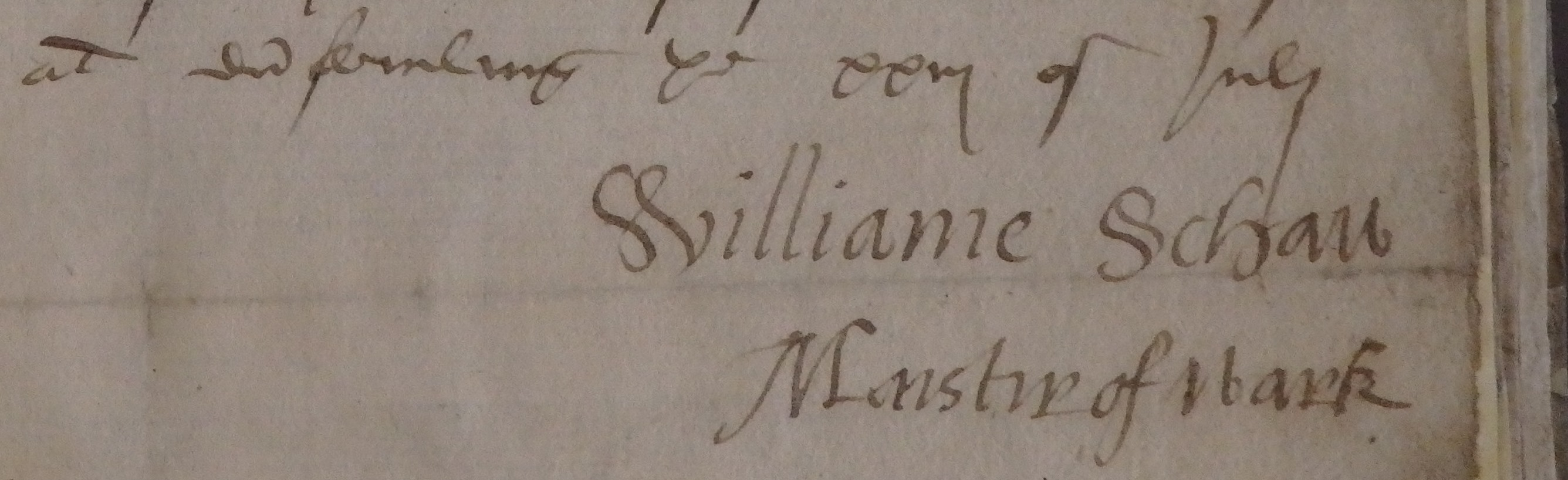
Signature of William Schaw (died 1602), Master of Work to King James VI and Anne of Denmark, National Records of Scotland

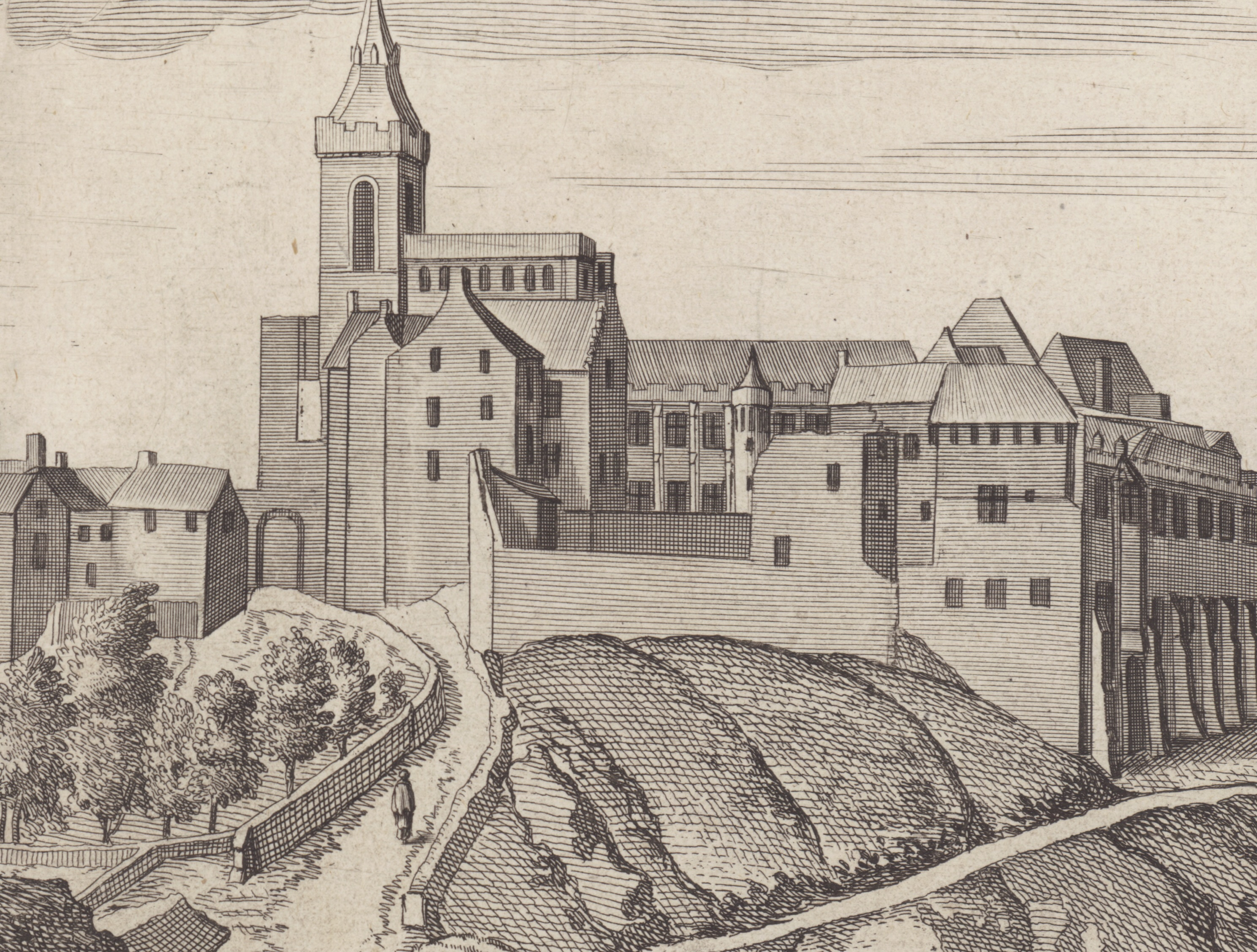
Dumfermline Abbey and Palace ruins in the late seventeenth century

In March 1589, Schaw was granted £1000 Scots of tax money to begin repairs at Holyroodhouse in advance of the reception of the bride of James V, Anne of Denmark. He was amongst the courtiers who accompanied James VI to Denmark to fetch his queen in October. He returned on 15 or 16 March 1590, ahead of the rest of the party to prepare for their subsequent return. He brought King James's letter written on 19 February at Kronborg to the Privy Council and his request that the Provost of Edinburgh, John Arnot, to supply him with a ship and good mariners. James VI also asked the Provost of Edinburgh to provide Schaw with the "many good craftsmen" necessary to complete the repairs at the Palace of Holyroodhouse.

David Moysie, a contemporary writer, wrote in his Memoir that Schaw also brought news that Anne of Denmark was pregnant, and Chancellor Maitland included this news in a letter to Robert Bruce. Anne of Denmark may have suffered a miscarriage at Dunfermline Palace in September 1590, where she was attended by the physician Martin Schöner and a midwife.

William Schaw brought with him a Danish locksmith called Frederick who would join the queen's household. Schaw busied himself repairing Holyrood Palace and Dunfermline Palace which had been assigned to the queen. He was given £1,000 Scots from tax money raised in Edinburgh for the royal marriage to spend on the repairs at Holyroodhouse. Queen Elizabeth gave a further 625 gold crowns to spend on Holyrood. Schaw was also responsible for the elaborate ceremony greeting her arrival at Leith and the decoration of St Giles' Kirk with tapestry for her coronation. He subsequently became Master of Ceremonies to the court, as his epitaph carved on his tomb states.

In June 1590 Schaw and his kinsman John Gibb, signed a bond in support of their relation James Gibb of Bo'ness who had fought illegally in Edinburgh near Holyrood Palace with James Boyd of Kippis in a family feud. His death sentence was converted to banishment. Lady Thirlestane's account of the subsidy money for August 1590 records a payment to Schaw for further building works.

=== Chamberlain to the Queen ===
Schaw was involved in discussions with the Danish ambassadors Steen Bille and Niels Krag who came to Edinburgh in May 1593 to secure Anne of Denmark's property rights. On 6 July he was appointed as Chamberlain to the Lordship of Dunfermline, which was an office of the household of Queen Anne, where he worked closely with Alexander Seton and William Fowler. This involved receipting accounts for jewels the Queen bought from the goldsmith George Heriot, collecting rents 'feumaills' from her lands including the rents of Ross, Ardmanoch, and Ettrick Forest, and sometimes auditing the queen's household accounts kept by Harry Lindsay of Kinfauns for Sir George Home of Wedderburn.

Alterations at Dunfermline Abbey were attributed to William Schaw's direction. He was said to have built a steeple, and a porch at the north door, added some of the external buttresses and fitted the interior for Presbyterian worship as a burgh and Parish church between 1594 and 1599. Schaw spent other sums of money on the palaces allocated from the subsidy Elizabeth gave to James VI.

Schaw was an influential figure and was able to intervene, as Chamberlain of Dunfermline, to resolve a feud between an Edinburgh goldsmith James Crawfurd and three French goldsmiths, Samson de la Grange, and Elias and Harry Le Tellier who worked in the Canongate. Elias Le Tellier was described as one of the queen's goldsmiths.

=== Chapel Royal at Stirling ===
James VI and Anna built a new Chapel Royal at Stirling Castle in 1594, which was probably built under his direction. The Italianate building was used for the christening of James' and Anna's son Prince Henry. During the baptism, Schaw, as Master of Ceremonies, placed the ducal crown, basin, and towel on a table near the pulpit.

=== Salamander jewel ===
Anne of Denmark gave Schaw a hat badge in the form of a golden salamander set with diamonds as a New Year's Day gift in 1595. The badge was supplied by the jeweller Thomas Foulis. Elizabeth I owned a salamander jewel and a gold salamander set with rubies was recovered from the Girona, a Spanish Armada wreck, and is now displayed at the Ulster Museum. Another gold salamander hat jewel, set with cabochon emeralds and diamonds, was discovered in London with the Cheapside Hoard.

=== Ulrik, Duke of Holstein ===
In March 1598 he was tasked with giving the Queen's brother, Ulrik, Duke of Holstein a tour of Scotland with Esmé's son, Ludovic, Duke of Lennox, taking him to Fife and Ravenscraig Castle, Dundee, Stirling Castle, and on a trip to the Bass Rock. He provided furnishings for the pregnant queen at Dalkeith Palace, and in September met an English Catholic exile George More who came to Dalkeith.

== Family and feud ==
His niece married Robert Mowbray, a grandson of the treasurer Robert Barton, and following his death she married James Colville of East Wemyss in 1601, which caused a family feud between Francis Mowbray, Robert's brother, and Schaw and Colville. Mowbray, an erstwhile English agent, wounded Schaw with a rapier in a quarrel, was subsequently arrested for plotting against the king, and died following an escape attempt from Edinburgh Castle. Another niece, Elizabeth Schaw of Broich, married John Murray of Lochmaben, an important courtier in the bedchamber, who became Earl of Annandale.

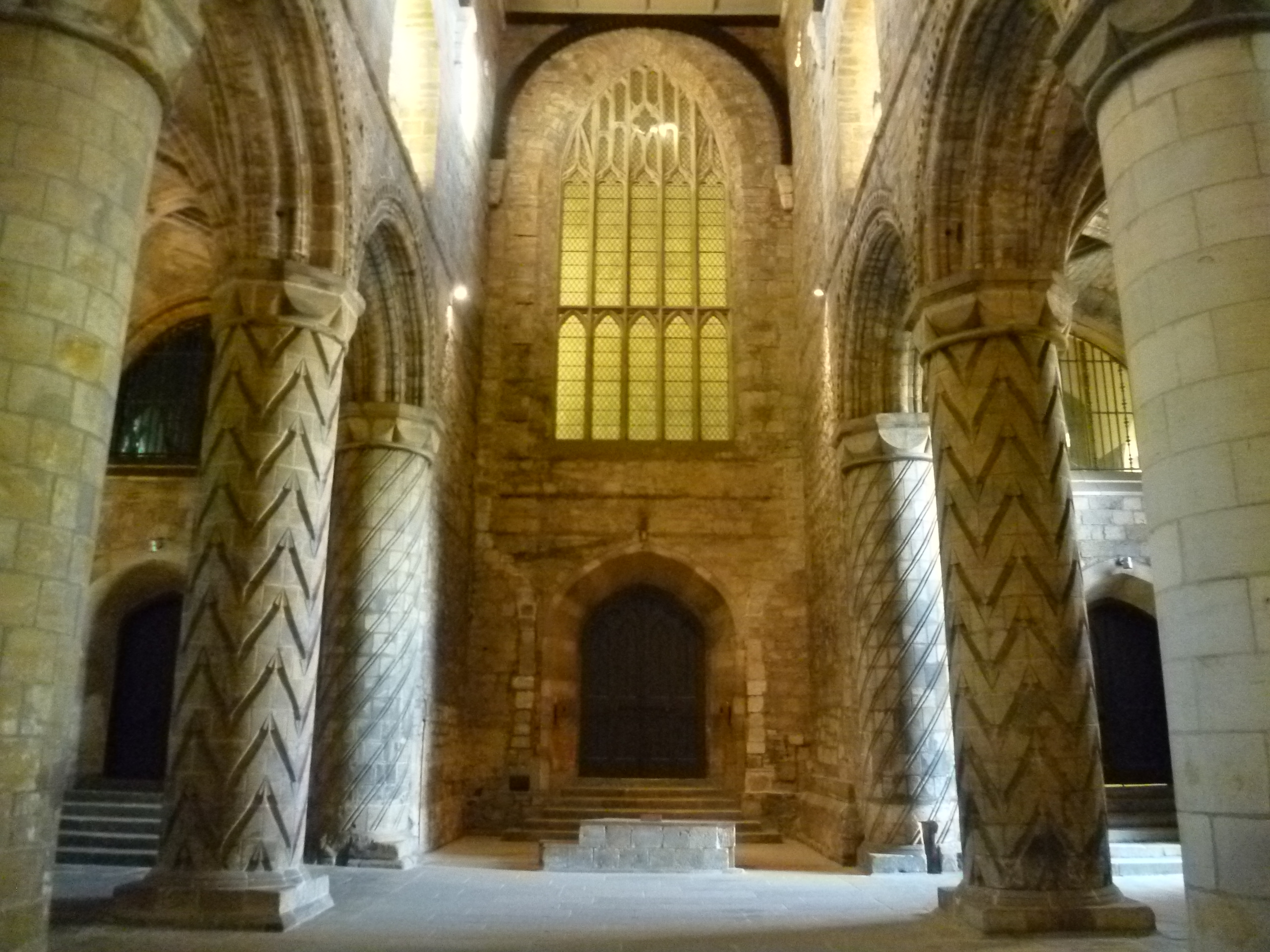
William Schaw was buried at Dunfermline Abbey

Schaw died in 1602. He was succeeded as King's Master of Works by David Cunningham of Robertland. His tomb in Dunfermline Abbey was constructed at the expense of his friend Alexander Seton and Queen Anne, and survives with a lengthy Latin inscription recording Schaw's intellectual skills and achievements. The tomb inscription remains the most valuable source of biographic information, and was composed by Alexander Seton, translated it reads:

This humble structure of stones covers a man of excellent skill, notable probity, singular integrity of life, adorned with the greatest of virtues – William Schaw, Master of the King's Works, President of the Sacred Ceremonies, and the Queen's Chamberlain. He died 18th April, 1602.

Among the living he dwelt fifty-two years; he had travelled in France and many other Kingdoms, for the improvement of his mind; he wanted no liberal training; was most skilful in architecture; was early recommended to great persons for the singular gifts of his mind; and was not only unwearied and indefatigable in labours and business, but constantly active and vigorous, and was most dear to every good man who knew him. He was born to do good offices, and thereby to gain the hearts of men; now he lives eternally with God.

Queen Anne ordered this monument to be erected to the memory of this most excellent and most upright man, lest his virtues, worthy of eternal commendation, should pass away with the death of his body."

Elizabeth Shaw and James Schaw were William's executors. In 1612 the Privy Council of Scotland searched the accounts and found he was still owed his annual fee for several years. The council wrote to the king that he had been, "in his lyftime, and during the tyme of his service, he wes a most painefull, trustye, and welle affectit servand to your majestie."

== Masonic Statutes ==
=== First Schaw Statutes ===
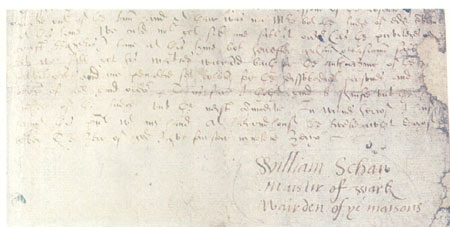
Signature of William Schaw on a copy of the Second Statutes, as "maister of wark" and "wairden of the maisons", Holyroodhouse, 28 December 1599

On 28 December 1598 Schaw, in his capacity of Master of Works and General Warden of the master stonemasons, issued "The Statutis and ordinananceis to be obseruit by all the maister maoissounis within this realme." The preamble states that the statutes were issued with the consent of a craft convention, simply specified as all the master masons gathered that day. Schaw's first statutes root themselves in the Old Charges, with additional material to describe a hierarchy of wardens, deacons and masters. This structure would ensure that masons did not take on work which they were not competent to complete, and ensured a lodge warden would be elected by the master masons, through whom the general warden could keep in touch with each particular lodge. Master masons were only permitted to take on three apprentices during their lifetime (without special dispensation), and they would be bound to their masters for seven years. A further seven years would have to elapse before they could be taken into the craft, and a book-keeping arrangement was set up to keep track of this. Six master masons and two entered apprentices had to be present for a master or fellow of the craft to be admitted. Various other rules were laid out for the running of the lodge, supervision of work, and fines for non-attendance at lodge meetings.

The first point of the new statutes was that master masons in Scotland should;

"observe and keep all the good ordinances set down of before, concerning the privileges of their craft, to their predecessours of good memory, and specially, they be true one to another, and live charitably together, as becomes sworn brothers and companions of craft."

The statutes were agreed by all the master masons present, and arrangements were made to send a copy to every lodge in Scotland. The statute indicates a significant advance in the organisation of the craft, with shires constituting an intermediate level of organisation. These "territorial" lodges ran parallel to another set of civic organisations, incorporations, often linking masons with other workers in the building trades, such as wrights. While in some places (Stirling and Dundee), the lodges and incorporations became indistinguishable, in other places the incorporation linked the trade to the burgh, and became a mechanism whereby the merchants exercised some control over the wages of the building trades. In places like Edinburgh, where the proliferation of wooden buildings meant a predominance of wrights, the territorial lodge offered a form of craft self-governance distinct from the incorporation. Also, the masons and wrights used differing ceremonial motifs, at the respective events. The role of deacon provided a link between these incorporations and the lodges.

Copies of the statute (along with the Second Shaw Statute) were written into the minutes of the Lodges of Edinburgh and Aitchison's Haven, near Prestonpans.

=== Second Schaw Statutes ===
The Second Schaw Statutes were signed on 28 December 1599, at Holyroodhouse and consisted of fourteen separate statutes. Some of these were addressed specifically to Lodge Mother Kilwinning, others to the lodges of Scotland in general. Kilwinning Lodge was given regional authority for west Scotland, its previous practices were confirmed, various administrative functions were specified and the officials of the lodge were enjoined to ensure that all craft fellows and apprentices "tak tryall of the art of memorie". More generally, rules were laid down for proper record keeping of the lodges, with specific fees being laid down.

The statutes state that Kilwinning was the head and second lodge in Scotland. This seems to relate to the fact that Kilwinning claimed precedence as the first lodge in Scotland, but that in Schaw's scheme of things, the Edinburgh Lodge would be most important followed by Kilwinning and then Stirling. David Stevenson argues that the Second Schaw statutes dealt with the response from within the craft to his first statutes, whereby various traditions were mobilised against his innovations, particularly from Kilwinning.

The reference to the art of memory may be taken as a direct reference to renaissance esotericism. William Fowler, the poet, who had been a colleague of Schaw both in his trip to Denmark and at Dunfermline, in Anne of Denmark's household, had instructed both the King and Queen in the technique. Indeed, Fowler had met Italian philosopher Giordano Bruno at the house of Michel de Castelnau in London in the 1580s. The art of memory constituted an important element of Bruno's magical system.

The statutes also address practical matters like health & safety concerns while working at heights. In his eighteenth article Schaw recommended that;

All masters or "interprisaris of warkis be verray cairfull to see thair skaffaldis and fute-gangis (platforms) surelie sett and placeit, to the effect that throw thair negligence and sleuth (laziness), na hurt or skaith cum unto persons that works at the said work, under the pain of discharging of thame thairafter to work as masters havand charge of ane work."

=== The Sinclair Statutes ===
Two letters were drawn up in 1600 and 1601 and involved the lodges of Dunfermline, St Andrews, Edinburgh, Aitchison's Haven and Haddington, and were signed by Schaw himself in his capacity of Master of Works (but not General Warden). They are known as the First Sinclair Statutes as they supposedly confirm the role of the lairds of Roslin as patrons and protectors of the craft. Once again it would suggest that Schaw's proposed reorganisation of the craft had encountered some problems. Indeed, it presaged an ongoing struggle between the Master of Works and the Sinclairs, which Schaw's successors in the post continued, following his death in 1602.

Preceded by Robert Drummond of Carnock	Master of Work to the Crown of Scotland; 1583–1602	Succeeded by David Cunningham of Robertland
