= Isobel Colt =

- Spouse: Patrick Smith
- Parents: Oliver Colt (possibly) (father); Isobel Henryson (possibly) (mother)

Isobel Colt was the nurse of Robert Stuart, Duke of Kintyre and Lorne, a son of James VI of Scotland and Anne of Denmark.

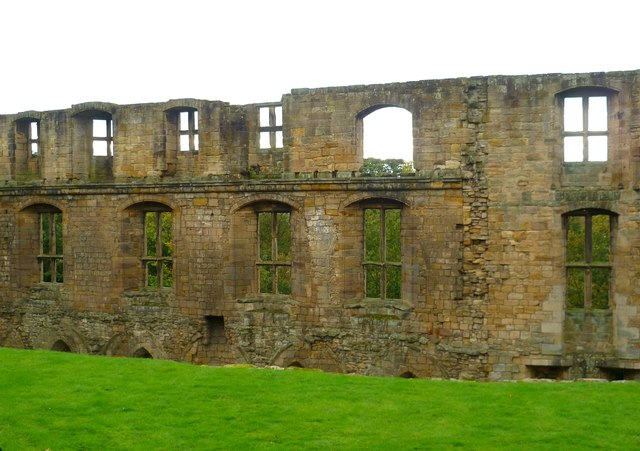
Isobel Colt was a servant at Dunfermline Palace

She may have been a daughter of an Edinburgh lawyer Oliver Colt and his wife Isobel Henryson, who was a daughter of Edinburgh merchant Thomas Henryson.

Isobel Colt was the wife of Patrick Smith, an Edinburgh lawyer and writer to the signet. Women in early modern Scotland did not change their surnames on marriage.

For the baptism of Duke Robert at Dunfermline Abbey on 2 May 1601, Isobel Colt was given new clothes including, taffeta from Tours for her gown, black velvet for a skirt and to border the gown, and black velvet for a "mutch" to wear on her head.

She was dismissed shortly before the death of Duke Robert, as it was thought a change of nurse would improve his health. Isobel was given £200 Scots as a reward for her service by the English courtier Roger Aston on 25 May 1602. The payment was witnessed by John Buchanan, who later married Margaret Hartsyde, a servant of Anne of Denmark.
