= James Hay (bishop) =

- Bishop of Ross
- Church: Roman Catholic Church
- See: Diocese of Ross
- In office: 1523–1538
- Predecessor: Robert Cockburn
- Successor: Robert Cairncross
- Previous post(s): Abbot of Dundrennan (1516–1538)

Orders
- Consecration: after 25 February 1525

Personal details
- Born: unknown unknown
- Died: 1538

James Hay O. Cist. (died 1538) was a Cistercian abbot and bishop important in the early 16th century Kingdom of Scotland. At some stage in his life he achieved a doctorate in decrees (i.e. canon law), enabling him to be styled D. D..

After the death of Edward Story, Abbot of Dundrennan, on 28 November 1516, Hay was provided to the now vacant abbacy; he became abbot sometime between 2 June and 9 August 1517.

In 1523, following the death of Robert Cockburn, Bishop of Ross, the regent John Stewart, Duke of Albany, nominated Hay to become the new bishop there, a nomination which seems to have been accepted by Pope Adrian VI before the latter died on 14 September 1523.

It was not, however, until 16 September 1524, that the temporalities of the bishopric of Ross were given into Hay's possession, and he had still not received consecration by 25 February 1525.

Among the few things known of his episcopate, Hay was one of the commissioners who held parliament on 11 March 1538; one William of Johnstoun was convicted of heresy in Hay's court in April of the same year. Hay appears to have died in this year, by 3 October at the latest. He was succeeded by Robert Cairncross.

== Notes ==
Catholic Church titles
Preceded by Edward Story	Abbot of Dundrennan; 1516–1524	Succeeded by John Maxwell
Preceded by Robert Cockburn	Bishop of Ross; 1523–1538	Succeeded by Robert Cairncross
