= Dunfermline Palace =

Former Scottish royal palace

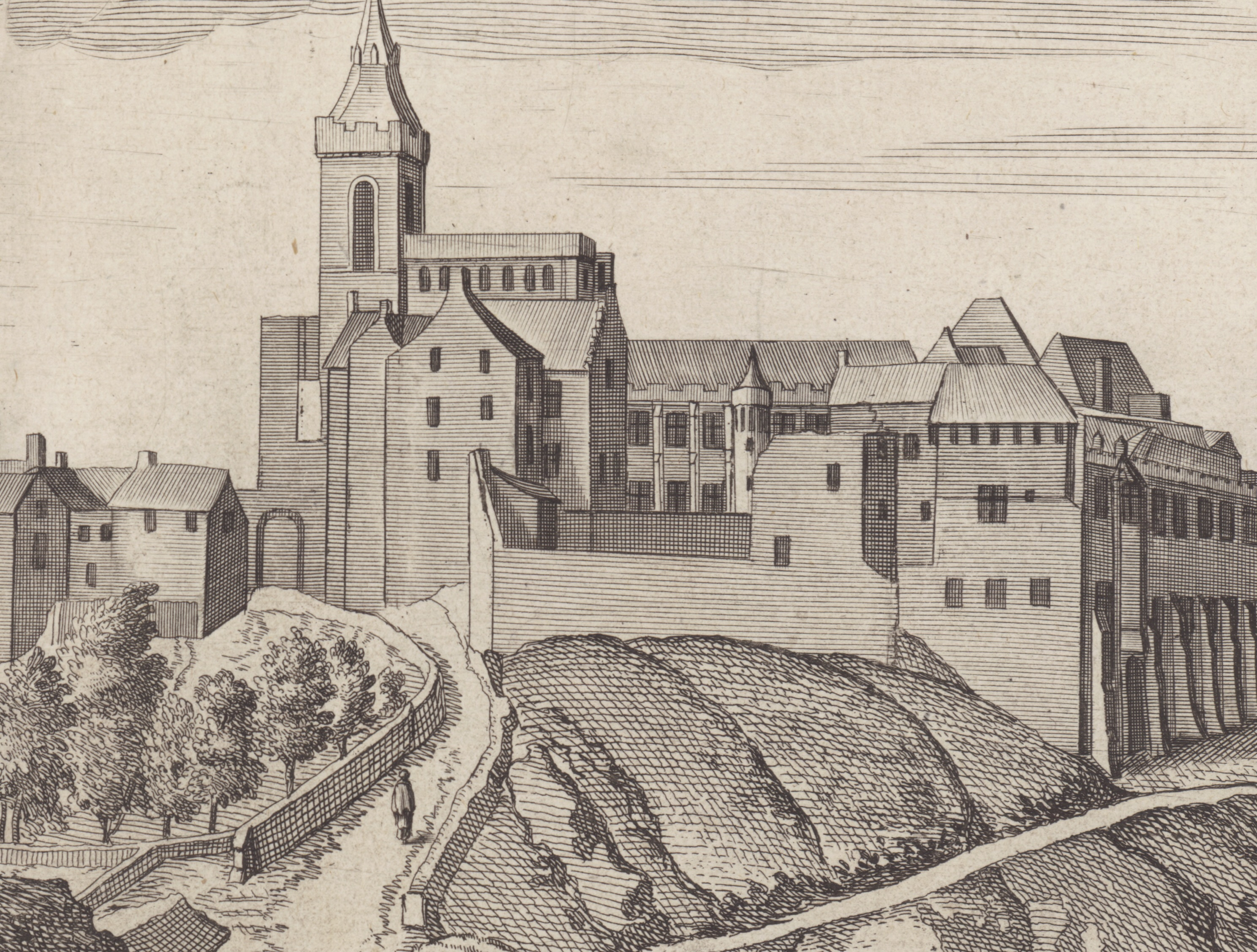
- Dunfermline Palace and Abbey, 17th-century drawing by John Slezer
- Interactive map of the Dunfermline Palace area

General information
- Coordinates: 56.06892°N 3.46489°W

Scheduled monument
- Official name: Dunfermline Abbey
- Designated: 5 December 1994
- Reference no.: SM90116

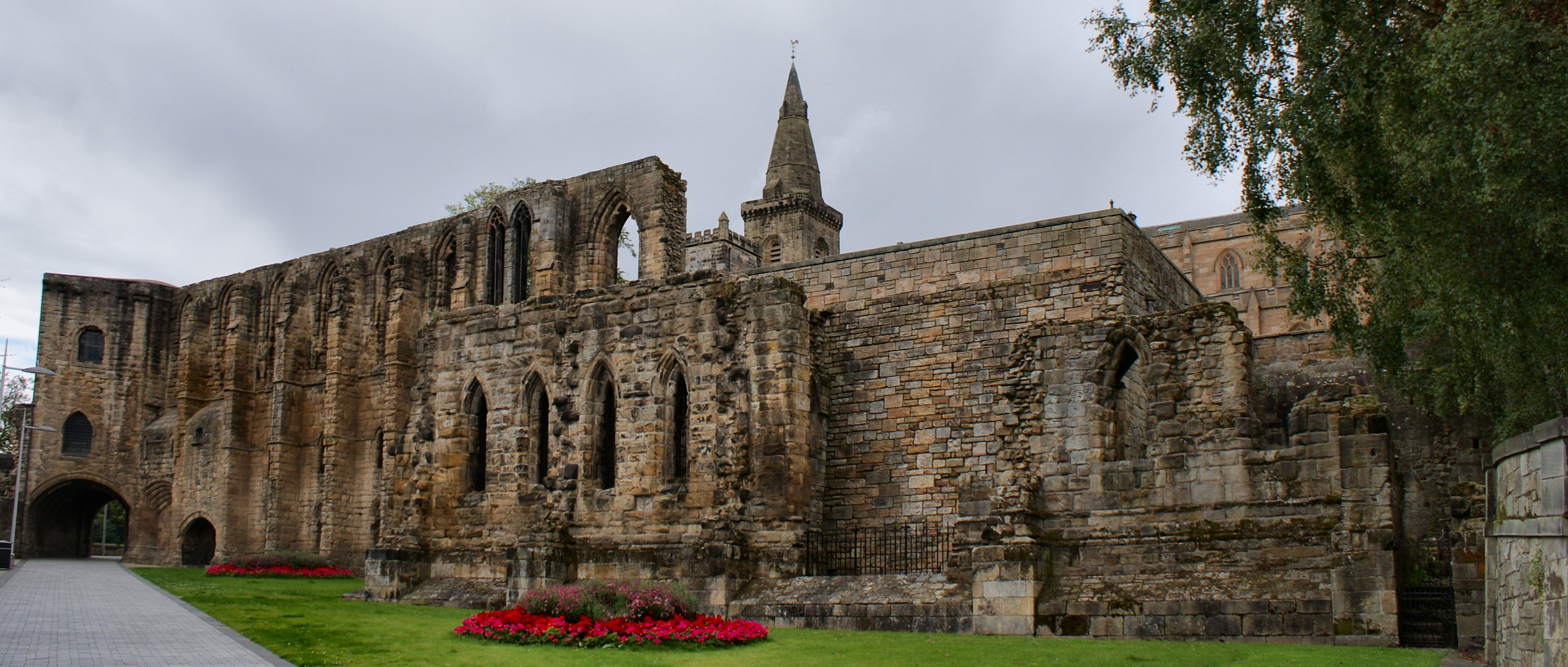
The imposing south wall and gatehouse of Dunfermline Palace

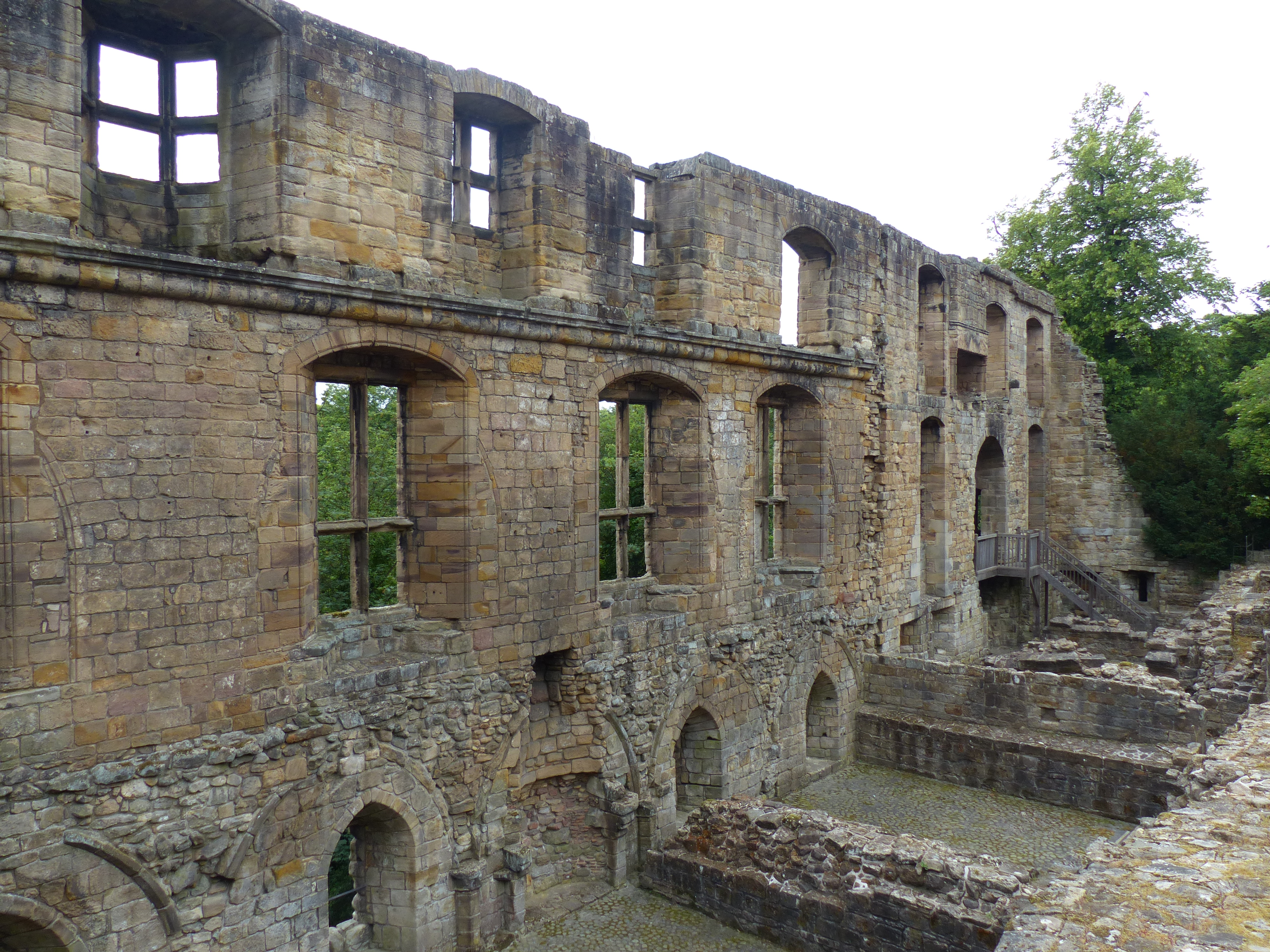
Remaining wall of the Renaissance palace at Dunfermline

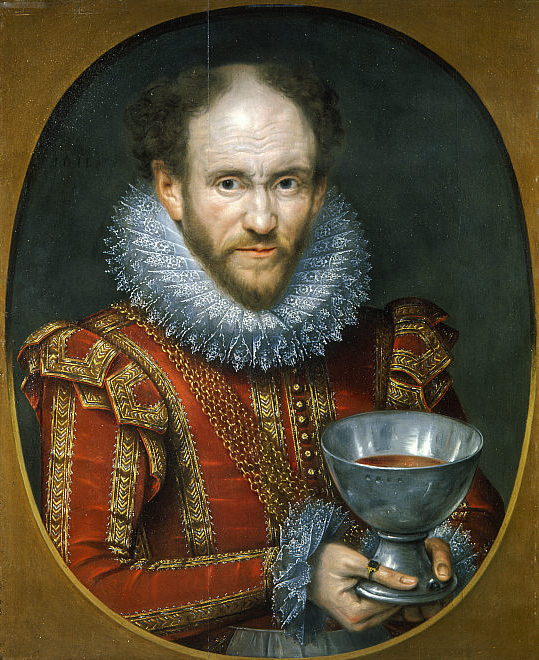
Tom Durie, Anne of Denmark's fool, National Galleries of Scotland

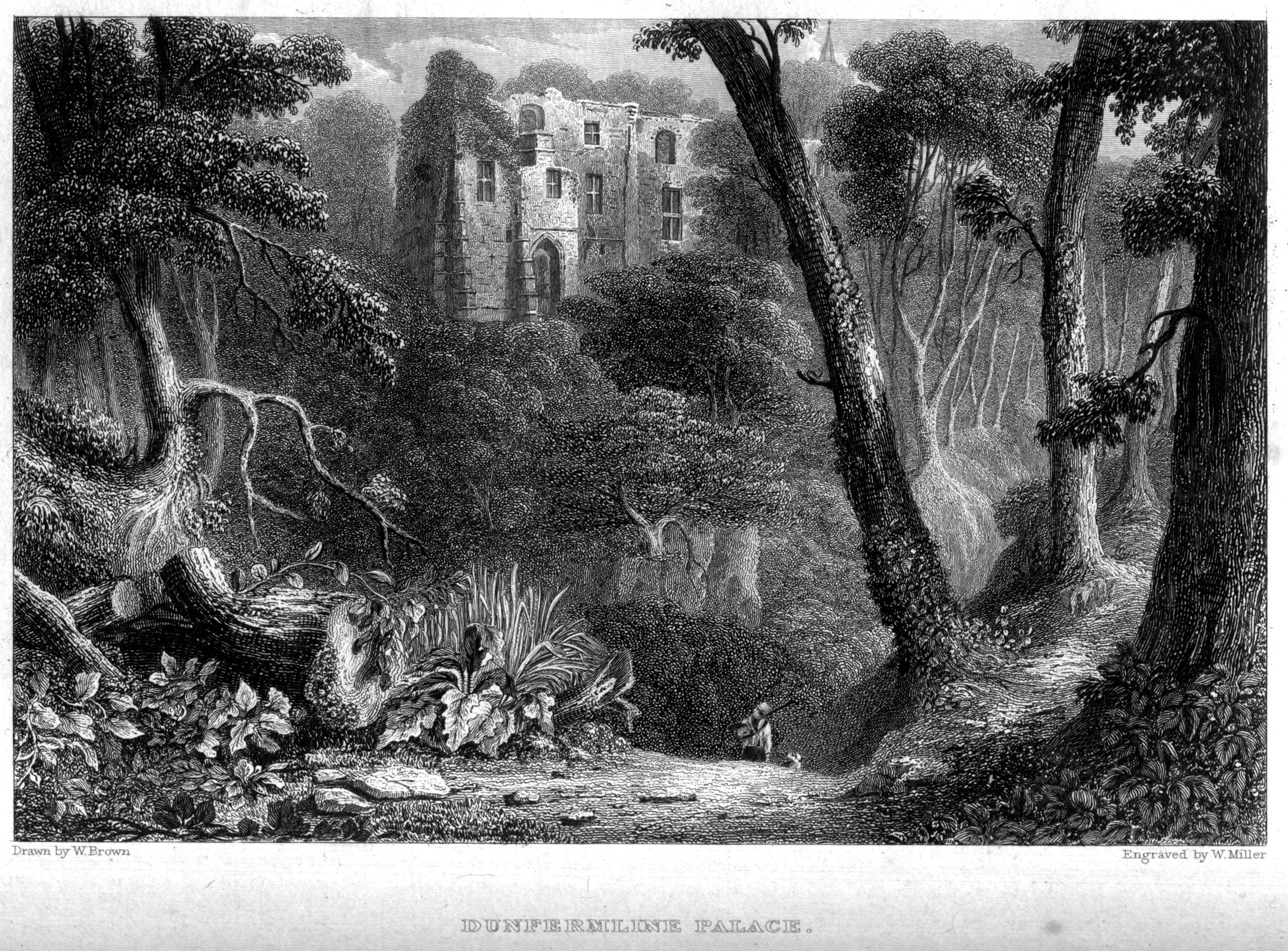
Dunfermline Palace seen from the Lyne burn, in an engraving by William Miller

Dunfermline Palace is a ruined former Scottish royal palace and important tourist attraction in Dunfermline, Fife, Scotland. It is currently, along with other buildings of the adjacent Dunfermline Abbey, under the care of Historic Environment Scotland as a scheduled monument.

== Origins ==
Dunfermline was a favourite residence of many Scottish monarchs. Documented history of royal residence there begins in the 11th century with Malcolm III who made it his capital. His seat was the nearby Malcolm's Tower, a few hundred yards to the west of the later palace. In the medieval period David II and James I of Scotland were both born at Dunfermline.

Dunfermline Palace is attached to the historic Dunfermline Abbey, occupying a site between the abbey and deep gorge to the south. It is connected to the former monastic residential quarters of the abbey via a gatehouse above a pend, one of Dunfermline's medieval gates (or yetts). The building therefore occupies what was originally the guest house of the abbey.

There are few records of building the palace and converting monastic buildings to royal use. Timber was bought for the royal lodgings in 1429. The existing remains largely reflect the form in which the building was remodelled by James IV around 1500 from the monastic Guest House. James IV came to the palaces and gave tips to masons and craftmen in 1507. The building was restored and remodelled later in the century, and William Schaw worked on the building in 1590 preparing it for Anne of Denmark. An account for glazing the palace in 1654 and a description by John Macky are important sources for the lost buildings.

== History ==
=== James IV ===
James IV and his wife Margaret Tudor frequently stayed at the palace. In November 1504 Margaret Tudor was in residence when two people were suspected of having plague. James IV was away in the north of Scotland. The queen left for Edinburgh with her household servants, including African women known as the "More lasses", who went first to Inverkeithing. This was a false alarm.

James V (1512–1542) and his second wife Mary of Guise also used the palace. On 14 June 1562 after dinner at Dunfermline, Mary, Queen of Scots, produced a gold ring set with a heart shaped diamond and declared she would send it to Queen Elizabeth with some verses she had written herself in Italian. At this time a meeting of the two queens was discussed.

=== Anne of Denmark ===
James VI stayed at Dunfermline Palace in June 1585 to avoid the plague which raged in Edinburgh. He had a proclamation made to regulate the prices of food, drink, and lodgings for his courtiers in Dunfermline town. In 1589 the palace was given as a wedding present by the king to his bride Anne of Denmark. James VI had to compensate the Master of Gray, who had rights to the title of Abbot or Commendator of Dunfermline, and allocated him 12,000 merks from a subsidy paid by Elizabeth I.

Anne of Denmark gave birth to three of their children in the palace; Elizabeth (1596), Charles (1600) and Robert (1602), attended by her German physician, Martin Schöner. Anne would sometimes travel between Edinburgh and Dunfermline by boat, taking meals at South Queensferry. She improved the palace during the decade.

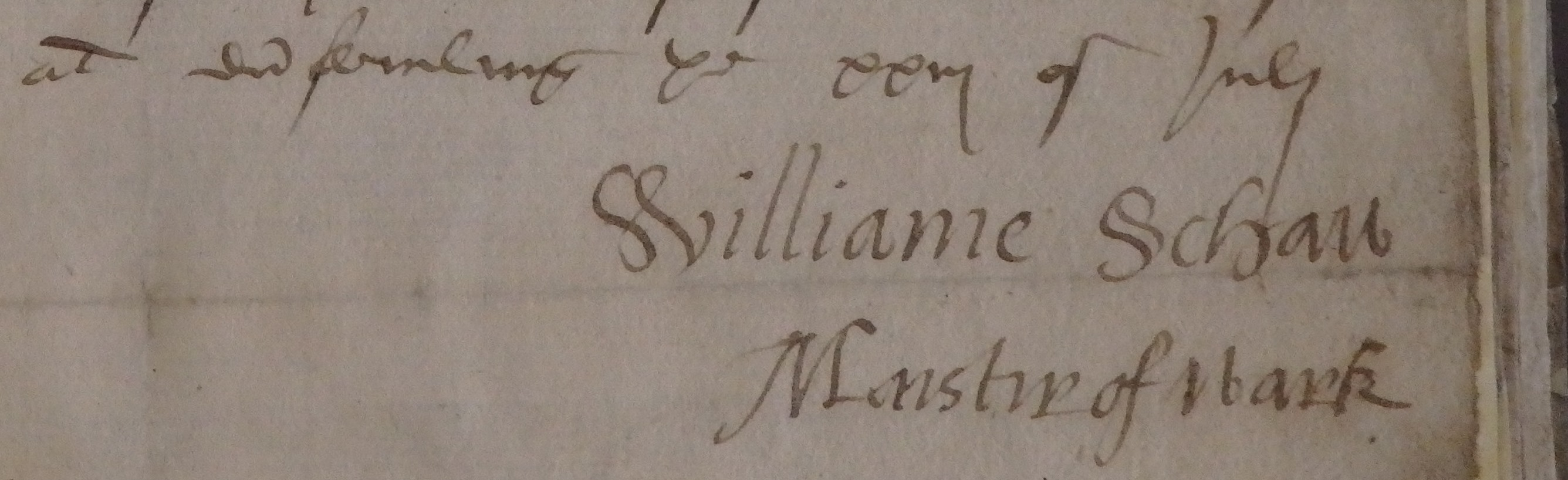
Signature of William Schaw (died 1602), Master of Work to King James VI and Anne of Denmark, National Records of Scotland

Anne of Denmark was given the lands formerly belonging to Dunfermline Abbey, and was known in charters of abbey lands as the "Lady of Dunfermline". In February 1596, Alexander Seton, Lord Urquhart, was appointed as her Bailie and Keeper and Constable of the palace. The palace staff included the keeper John Gibb, the chamberlains of the estates David Seton of Parbroath, William Schaw, and Henry Wardlaw of Pitreavie, the gardener John Lowrie, the plumber James Coupar, who fixed the lead roofs, and Thomas Walwood, foreman of the coal pits. She was entertained by an English musician John Norlie and her fool Tom Durie. Later, a story circulated that Tom Durie had stumbled on the queen holding a secret Mass at the palace.

When George Bruce acquired lands near Dunfermline in 1599, he undertook to carry sand to the building works at the palace. In 1600, Anne of Denmark completed a new building at the palace known as the "Queen's House", or "Queen Anna of Denmark's House" or the "Queen's Jointure House". It was demolished in 1797. The new work was cruciform in plan. It was a tall building with a driveway known as a "pend" running through its basement level, replacing an earlier gateway. This feature can be compared with the Queen's House at Greenwich which was also built over a roadway. A Latin inscription (now lost) recorded that the "gateway and temple-like superstructure" was reconstructed for Anne. Near the west front of the abbey there were houses for the senior officers of her estates. There was a tennis court in the old abbey cloister.

Charles was born at Dunfermline in 1600, followed by Robert in 1602. Anne of Denmark was attended by her German physician, Martin Schöner, and Margaret Douchall, the wife of Jerome Bowie. The royal nursery at Dunfermline was managed by Margaret Stewart, Mistress of Ochiltree. Isobel Colt was one the nurses. It is said that a local gentlewoman, Margaret MacBeth, widow of Henry Durie of Craigluscar, provided the queen with herbal remedies and attended the royal births. At the time of Charles' birth in November 1600, a new green velvet and taffeta bed was built for Anne in a room in the palace.

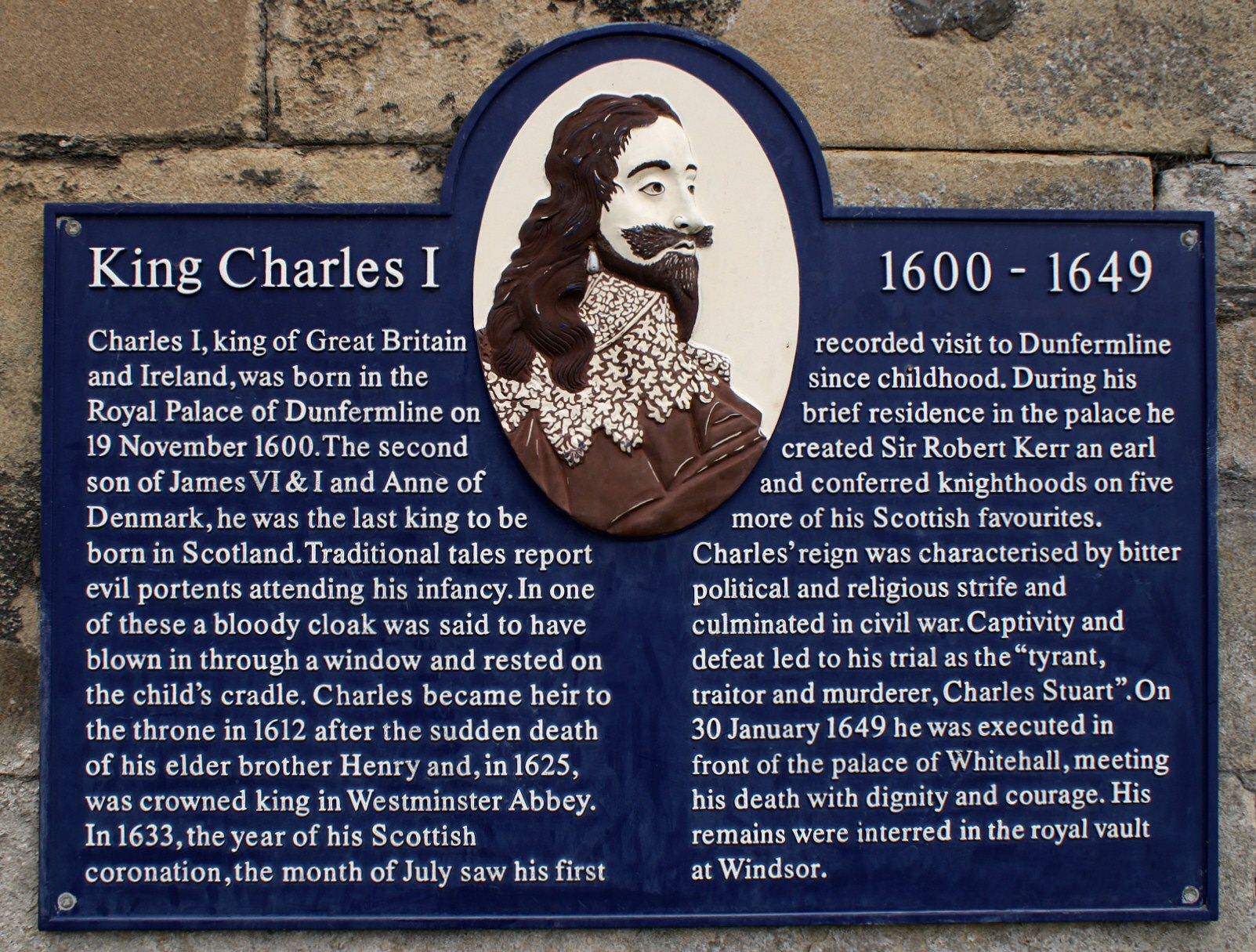
Plaque commemorating King Charles I who was born at Dunfermline Palace in 1600

In November 1601 Anne prepared a lodging for her daughter Princess Elizabeth, but the princess remained at Linlithgow Palace on the king's orders. There was a steep stairwell outside Anne of Denmark's bed chamber, and in March 1602 the English courtier Roger Aston fell down it and was unconscious for three hours. At this time there was a plague scare in Edinburgh, and the Privy Council was anxious that the contagion should not reach the "ordinary place of residence of the Queen, his highness' dearest spouse, and of their majesties' bairns". Ferry crossings to and from Dunfermline were suspended, except for royal councillors and household servants with a clean bill of health.

=== Prince Charles at Dunfermline ===
After the Union of Crowns in 1603, the removal of the Scottish court to London meant that the building came to be rarely visited by a monarch. Prince Charles, who was a sickly child, stayed at Dunfermline for a year.

His guardians were Alexander Seton and his wife Grissal Leslie. Jane Drummond, later Countess of Roxburghe, looked after him and an older woman, Marion Hepburn, was in charge of rocking his cradle. Hepburn had previously been appointed to rock the cradle of his older sisters Margaret and Elizabeth. The Prince was slow to learn to walk and was provided with an oak stool with wheels to train him, described in the Scots language as a "tymber stule with rynand quheillis to gang in".

An English courtier, Robert Carey, came to Dunfermline and stayed with Alexander Seton, and wrote that Prince Charles was "a very weak child". Dr Henry Atkins wrote from Dunfermline in July 1604 to Anna of Denmark, saying that Prince Charles could now walk the length of the "great chamber" or "longest chamber" several times daily without a stick, "like a gallant soldier all alone". Atkins added that Charles, walking without a staff, was "not so bold as Ajax but as wary as Ulysses". Atkins reported that Charles began his journey to England on 17 July 1604, crossing the Forth to the Lord Secretary's house near Edinburgh.

Alexander Seton and his wife Grizel Leslie brought Prince Charles to England in 1604, and he was lodged at Oatlands Palace. Robert Carey and his wife Elizabeth were appointed to look after him. Some of the Prince's old servants from Dunfermline went to England and were given pensions, including Marion Hepburn, the seamstress Joan Drummond, the laundress Agnes Fortune, the chamber door keeper George Kirke, and the cook John Lyle.

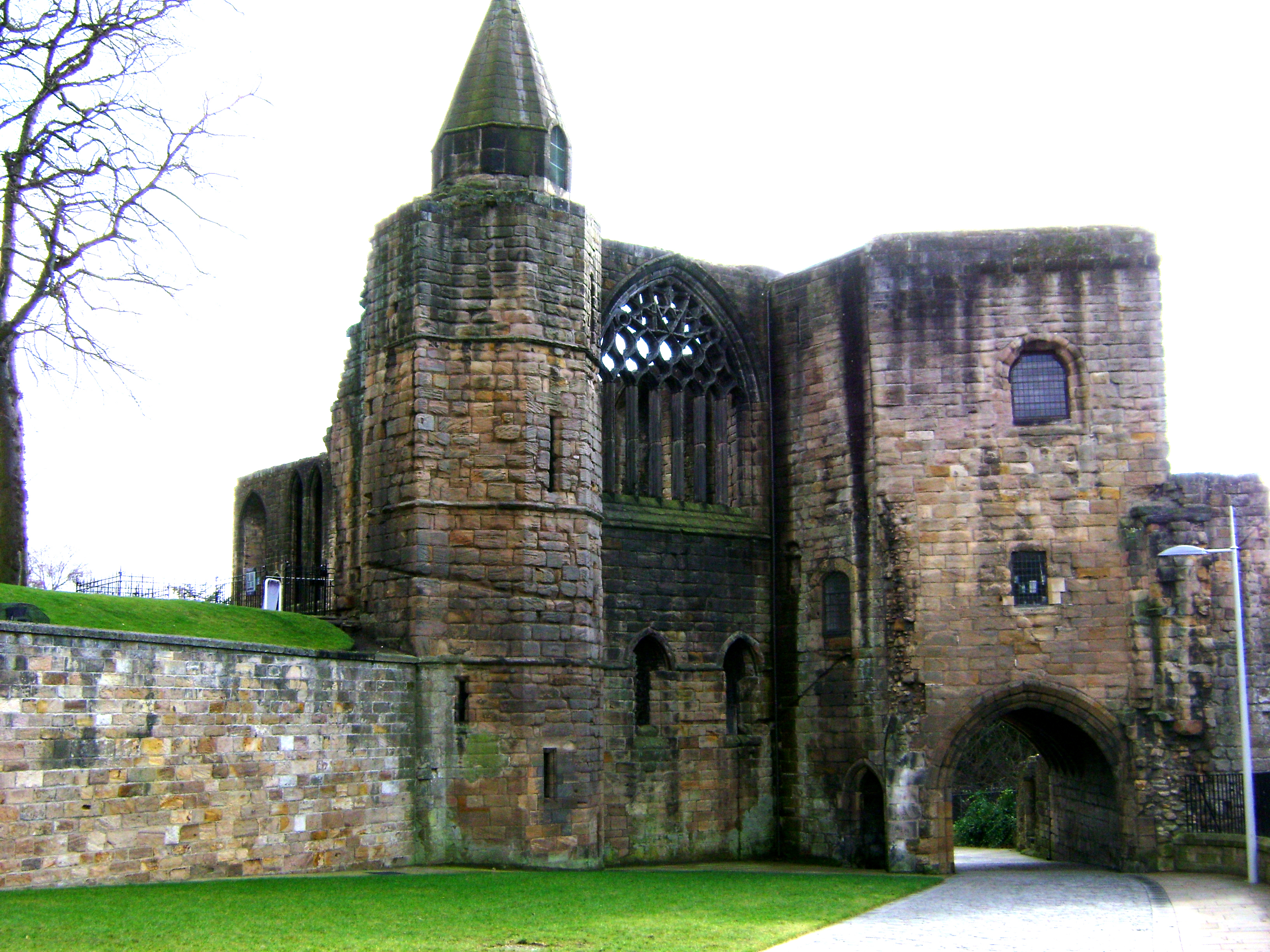
The gatehouse and pend which link Dunfermline Palace and Abbey

Ten tapestries from the royal tapestry collection were still at Dunfermline Palace in 1616, left from the time the infant Prince Charles resided at the palace. In 1618 John Taylor, the Water Poet, lodged for a night at the house of the keeper since 1584, John Gibb, which was presumably a part of the palace. Taylor described the site, "the Queenes Palace, a delicate and princely mansion, withall I saw the ruins of an ancient and stately built Abbey, with fair gardens, orchards, meadows, belonging to the Palace."

When Anne of Denmark died in 1619 ownership of the palace and her lands in Scotland passed to Prince Charles. A new great seal of the lordship was made and the "new great house" built by his mother was repaired. The town was devastated by a fire on 25 May 1624 and Prince Charles sent £500 sterling in aid.

=== Charles I and Charles II ===
In February 1633 Lord Traquair, the treasurer-depute, inspected Linlithgow Palace, Dunfermline Palace, and Stirling Castle to estimate for repairs in advance of a royal visit. Charles I returned to Scotland in 1633 for his coronation but only made a brief visit to his place of birth. The last monarch to occupy the palace was Charles II who stayed at Dunfermline in 1650 just before the Battle of Pitreavie. Anne Halkett described meeting him there. Soon afterwards, during the Cromwellian occupation of Scotland, the building was abandoned and by 1708 it had been unroofed.

Bishop Pococke was shown the site of the "skaipell" or tennis court in 1760, between the monastic refectory and the abbey tower. The "Queen's House" of 1600 was demolished in 1797. Drawings and engraved views shows battlements and stair towers with conical roofs.

All that remains of the palace is the kitchen, its cellars, and the large south wall with a commanding prospect over the Firth of Forth to the south.

== See also ==
- Scheduled monuments in Fife
