= Dundrennan Abbey =

Abbey in Dumfries and Galloway, Scotland

Coordinates: 54°48′24″N 3°56′52″W

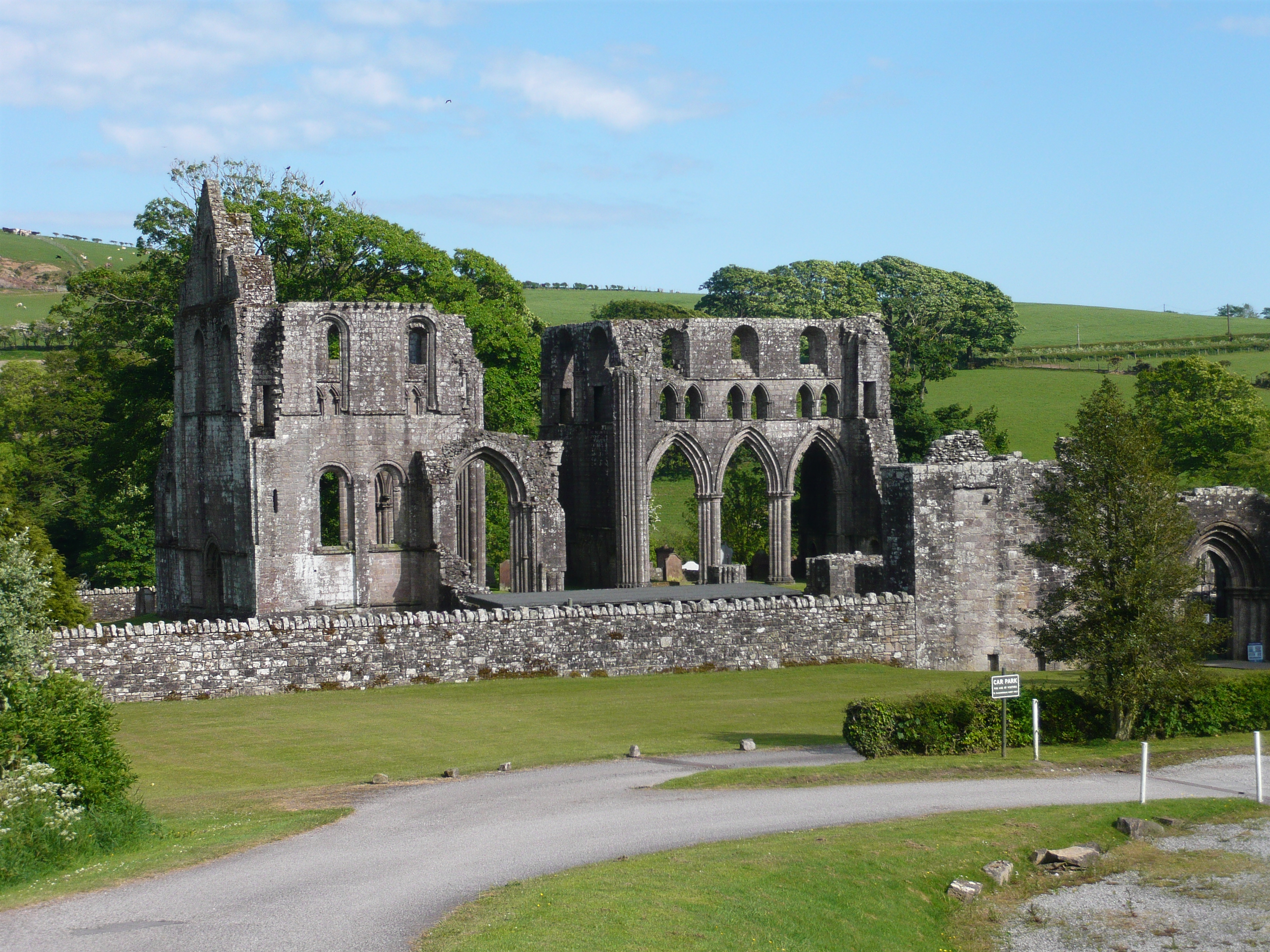
- Interactive map of Dundrennan Abbey

Monastery information
- Order: Cistercian
- Established: 1142
- Disestablished: 1606
- Mother house: Rievaulx Abbey
- Diocese: Diocese of Galloway
- Controlled churches: Kirkmabreck; Rerrick (Dundrennan)

People
- Founder: Fergus of Galloway
- Important associated figures: Thomas Livingston

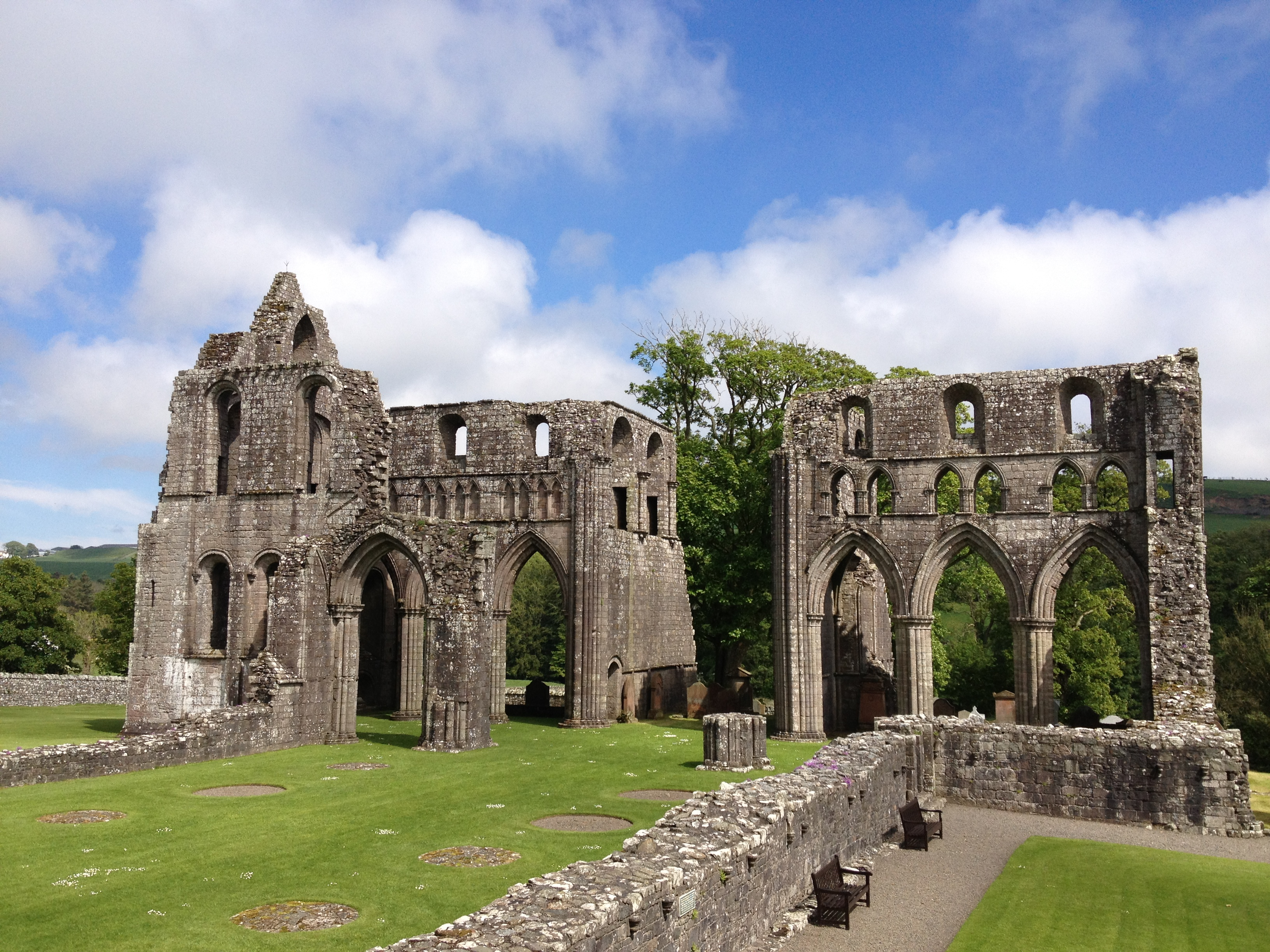
Dundrennan Abbey

Dundrennan Abbey, in Dundrennan, Scotland, near to Kirkcudbright, was a Cistercian monastery in the Romanesque architectural style, established in 1142 by Fergus of Galloway, King David I of Scotland (1124–53), and monks from Rievaulx Abbey. Though extensively ruined (the transepts are the main surviving parts), Dundrennan is noted for the purity and restraint of its architecture, reflecting the austere Cistercian ideal. It is also built from very hard-weathering grey sandstone, so the original architectural forms and mouldings are well preserved.

Mary, Queen of Scots, after the Battle of Langside, spent her final night in Scotland here, in 1568. From neighbouring Port Mary, she crossed the Solway Firth to Workington, and shortly after was imprisoned by the English.

In 1587, following the Scottish Reformation, the land passed to the Crown. The site fell into ruin after it was subsequently used to house livestock. Historic Environment Scotland maintains the site today as a scheduled monument.

== History ==
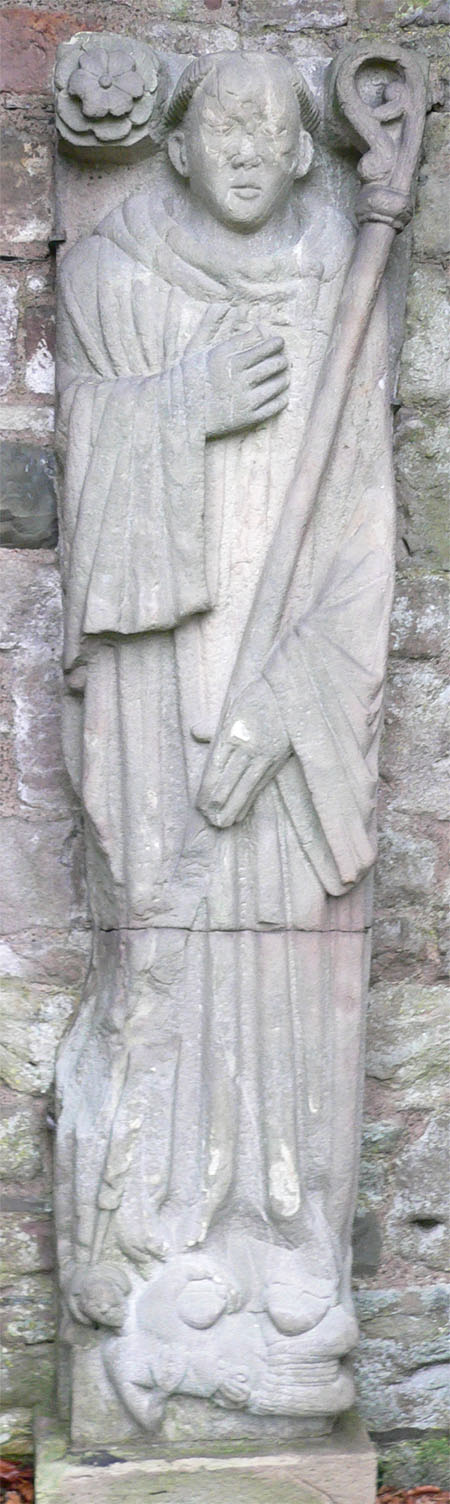
Abbot's Monument

In the mid 12th century, Fergus of Galloway resurrected the Bishopric of Whithorn, an ancient Galwegian See first established by the expansionary Northumbrians under the jurisdiction of the Archbishop of York. The last Bishop of Whithorn, Beadwulf, had been noted in c. 803. Thereafter nothing is heard; and it is likely the Bishopric disappeared with Northumbrian power, a decline marked by the sack and subsequent occupation of York by the Danes in 867. In the following two and a half centuries, Galloway, if and where jurisdiction actually existed, seems to have been under the jurisdiction of the Bishop of Man in the west, with Durham and Glasgow in the east.

Moves to resurrect the See were initiated on 9 December 1125, when Pope Honorius II wrote to the Bishop-elect of Whithorn, ordering him to appear before the Archbishop of York. The would-be Bishop was a cleric called Gille Aldan, and the Archbishop was Thurstan. York had been coming under increasing pressure from the ambitions of Canterbury, and the northern English metropolitan had only two suffragans (Durham and Man). He needed three in fact to hold proper Archiepiscopal elections. It is likely that York and Fergus did a deal. The involvement of King David I can be discounted on the grounds of his anti-York policies, and his total inclination to appoint English or French clerics, and not Gaelic ones like Gille Aldan. The deal ensured the Galwegian church would not undermine Fergus’ independence of both Man or Scotland, and secured an identity for the new kingdom in the framework of northern Britain and the Isles.

== Archaeology ==
During the 1990s Historic Scotland (now Historic Environment Scotland) funded excavations of the south-east corner of the Cistercian abbey cloister. The excavations found elements of a warming house, a novice's day room, a great drain and a latrine block undercroft. These excavations and a programme of geophysical survey and test-trenching uncovered the building sequence of the abbey:

- Period I:c1170–1230
- Period II:c1230–1320
- Period III:c1320–1450
- Period IV:c1450–1520
- Period V:c1520–1600

== Burials ==
- Alan of Galloway

== See also ==
- Abbot of Dundrennan
- Scheduled monuments in Dumfries and Galloway
