= Elizabeth Schaw, Countess of Annandale =

Scottish courtier

Elizabeth Schaw
- Died: 1640
- Spouse: John Murray, 1st Earl of Annandale (m. 1611)
- Children: 2, including James Murray, 2nd Earl of Annandale

Elizabeth Schaw (died 1640) was a Scottish courtier and a lady-in-waiting to Anne of Denmark.

== Family background ==
Elizabeth Schaw was a daughter of Sir John Schaw of Broich and Arngomery, a niece of William Schaw, The Bishop Andrew Knox (bishop) called her his aunt. Another Elizabeth Schaw, a cousin, the wife of Henry Lindsay, 13th Earl of Crawford, was also a servant of Anne of Denmark.

Elizabeth Schaw was an executor of her childless uncle William Schaw's property. Her sister married Robert Mowbray, a grandson of the treasurer Robert Barton, and following his death she married James Colville of East Wemyss in 1601, which caused a family feud between Francis Mowbray, Robert's brother, and Schaw and Colville.

== Courtier ==
Peter Young recorded that she was one of the queen's gentlewomen or maids, and in February 1603 he named one of his daughters after her.

In the years before her marriage, at court in England, Anne of Denmark gave Elizabeth Schaw gifts of her old clothing including five gowns, a satin doublet, and a skirt. She was able to submit petitions for favours to the queen. The queen's secretary William Fowler wrote out a letter to her on behalf of one Elizabeth Hoby. On one occasion, Fowler wrote to the Queen asking to hear her reply from either Schaw or Jean Drummond.

She married John Murray of the bedchamber and of Lochmaben, probably in 1611, and in England was known as Mrs Murray, and later Countess of Annandale. The couple were an important conduit for Scottish appeals to the King. Anne Livingstone, Countess of Eglinton, wrote to her in 1615, addressing the letter to "My Dear and loving Brother". The poet David Murray of Gorthy delivered the letters from London.

She returned to Scotland on leave from the household in 1613 and visited several places including Falkland Palace and stayed with her friend Marie Stewart, Countess of Mar at Alloa Tower. The lawyer Thomas Hamilton wrote to her husband, "she hopes to take well with her natural air, and nevertheless intends to make goodly haste to you, and to come as near the term appointed by her majesty as she may ... she must give this time to her friends who are desirous to salute and welcome her to the country."

In July 1615, she was involved in an incident in court politics when Henry Gibb, a new and minor servant of the king, delivered her a scandalous letter from Robert Carr, 1st Earl of Somerset, the Lord Chamberlain, for the queen. She sent news of this, and the queen's support for her and her husband, to the Countess of Eglinton.

King James authorised payment of her pension for attending Anna of Denmark on 14 November 1622.

She had three daughters. Their son James (d. 1658), later Earl of Annandale and Viscount Stormont, was baptised in the Chapel Royal at Holyrood Palace on 19 August 1617, William Couper preached and Anne Livingstone, Countess of Eglinton, presented the child.
