= Thomas Livingston (Royal Navy officer) =

Scottish Royal Navy officer (1769–1853)

Sir Thomas Livingston KB (20 November 1769 – 1 April 1853) was a Scottish Royal Navy officer during the Napoleonic Wars who rose to the rank of Admiral

== Biography ==
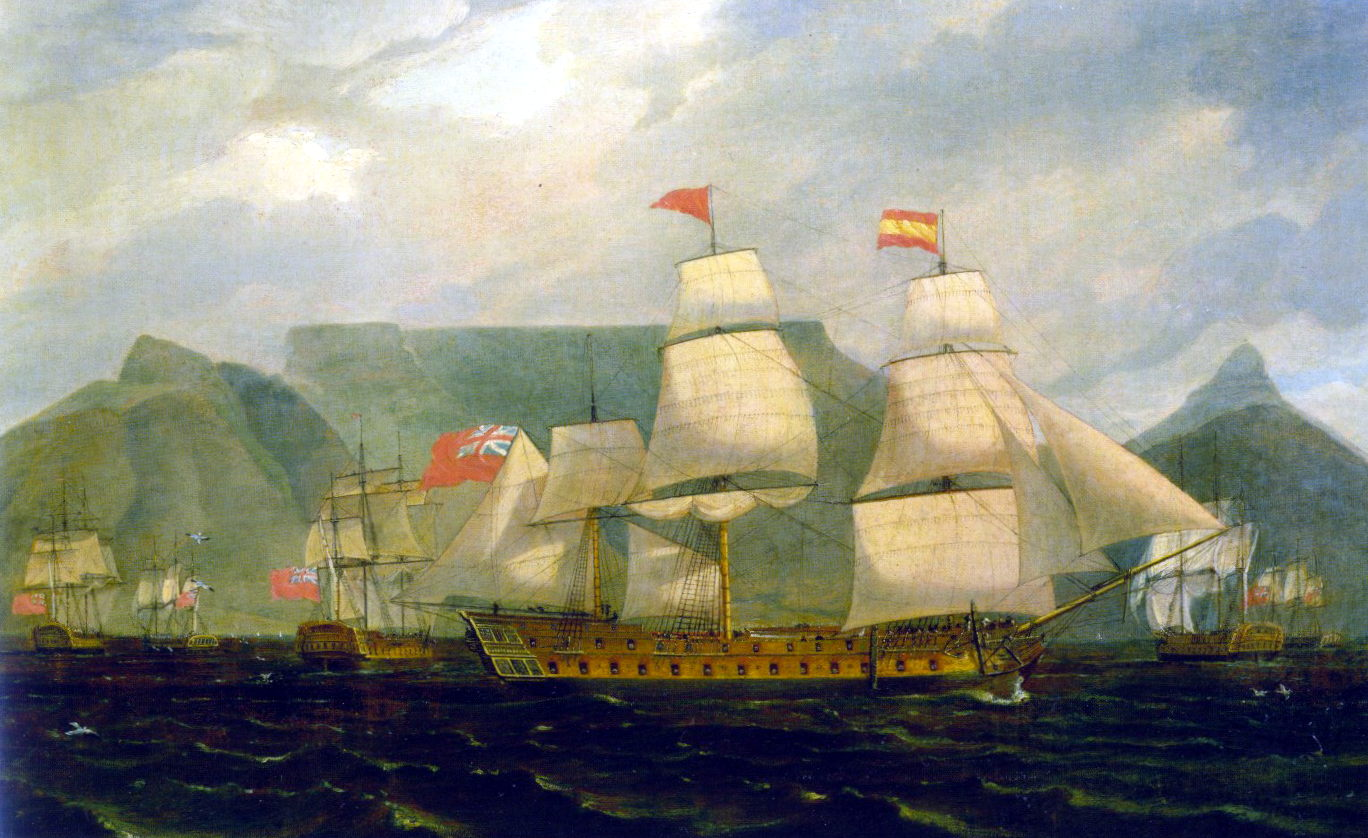
HMS Diadem

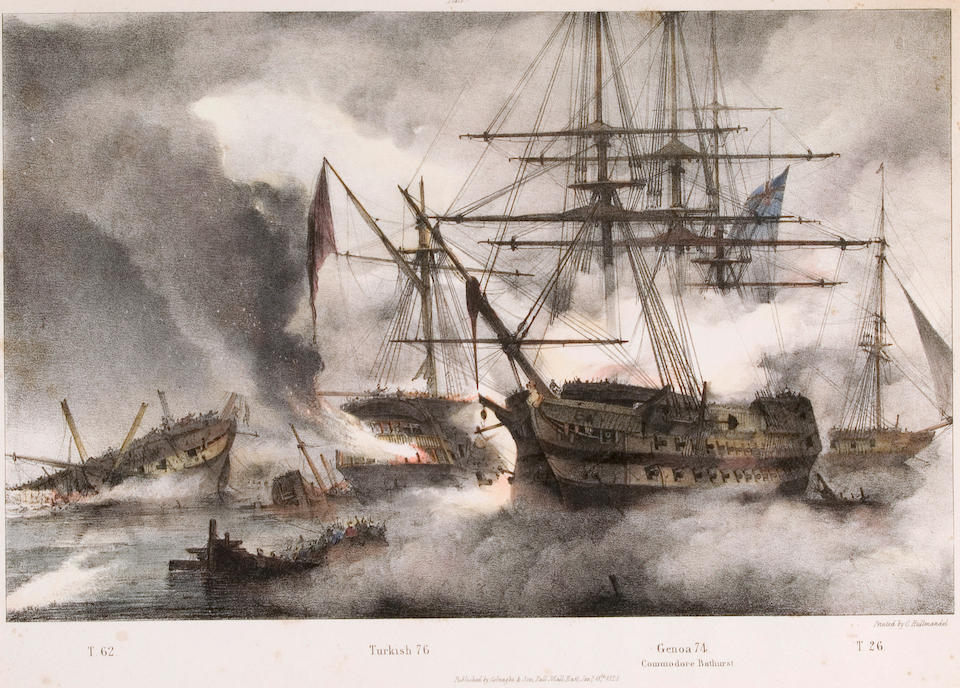
HMS Genoa

He was born on 20 November 1769, to Alexander Livingston, whose ancestors, the Livingstons of Bedlormie, had bought the Westquarter estate in 1701. The family, as Jacobite sympathisers, lost their lands after the uprising of 1715. Thomas's father laid claim to the historic title of Earl of Callendar in 1784. He did not pursue this but was successful in regaining the ancestral home of Westquarter house (near Falkirk).

He is first recorded in the Royal Navy in November 1790 as a Lieutenant on HMS Brilliant moving to HMS Camel in April 1791.

In December 1796, he was given command of HMS Echo. However, this notional command was simply to sail this battle damaged ship (which had helped to capture the Dutch fleet at Saldanha Bay) to the Cape of Good Hope to be paid off and broken in October 1797.

In July 1798, he was given command of HMS Expedition in place of Captain Home Riggs Popham. The ship's first duties were in Dublin before going to Egypt in 1801 as part of the Egypt Campaign against the French fleet. Livingston possibly left before the ship joined this campaign, being given command of the 64-gun HMS Diadem as captain and Commander in January 1800, but appears to have had dual command of the ships. Diadem was posted to Quiberon Bay on the west coast of France, seeing battle action in June 1800. In March 1801, the ship was part of the attack on Aboukir Bay in Egypt. Livingston was replaced by Captain John Larmour at some point during 1801 to take the ship back to Britain to repair battle damage.

Leaving the Diadem he took command of the captured French ship HMS Athenian, which was relaunched at Malta after repairing battle damage. However, his role with this ship was to sail her to Britain (Plymouth docks) to re-equip to Royal Navy standards.

He enjoyed two years of shore leave before being given command of the 44-gun HMS Mediator in August 1804. Mediator had previously been a merchant ship called "Ann and Amelia" launched in 1781 and pressed into Royal Navy service. Livingston was her first commander in this new guise, launched in August 1804. In January 1805, he transferred to the captured French ship HMS Renommee. On 17/18 July 1805, under his command Renommee was part of a ten ship attack on a group of five French ships off the French coast at Calais.

From 1807 until October 1821 Livingston has no recorded activity but then spent a three-year command of the 74-gun HMS Genoa (a French ship captured at Genoa in 1814). During his command the ship mainly served as a guardship protecting Chatham Docks.

Livingston retired in 1824 and was promoted to Rear Admiral of the White in July 1830. He retired to the family estate of Westquarter and died there on 1 April 1853, aged 83. Thomas was childless and after a period of vacancy Westquarter passed to Thomas Fenton Livingstone in 1884 and extensively rebuilt.

== Family ==
He married Janet Stirling, eldest daughter of Sir James Stirling, 1st Baronet.
