= Robert Gibb (courtier) =

Scottish landowner and courtier (1490–1558)

Robert Gibb or Gib (1490–1558) was a Scottish landowner and courtier.

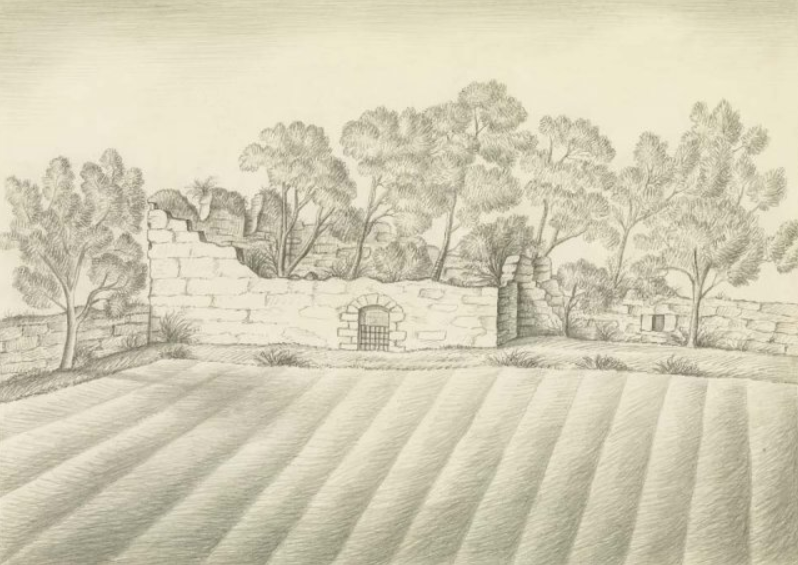
Carribber Castle, drawn by Alexander Archer, May 1837

== Life ==
His home and lands were at Carribber Castle near Linlithgow in West Lothian. The estate was on the banks of the River Avon next to Woodcockdale. Robert Gibb inherited these lands from his father, also Robert Gibb who assigned him a reversion of the lands before witnesses at Linlithgow Palace in June 1541.

He was appointed a Stirrup-man to James V of Scotland on 6 September 1524, and became Esquire of the Stable in 1538. A Latin record of 1538 and 1540 calls him "scutifero, alias lie 'squyer' stabuli domini regis".

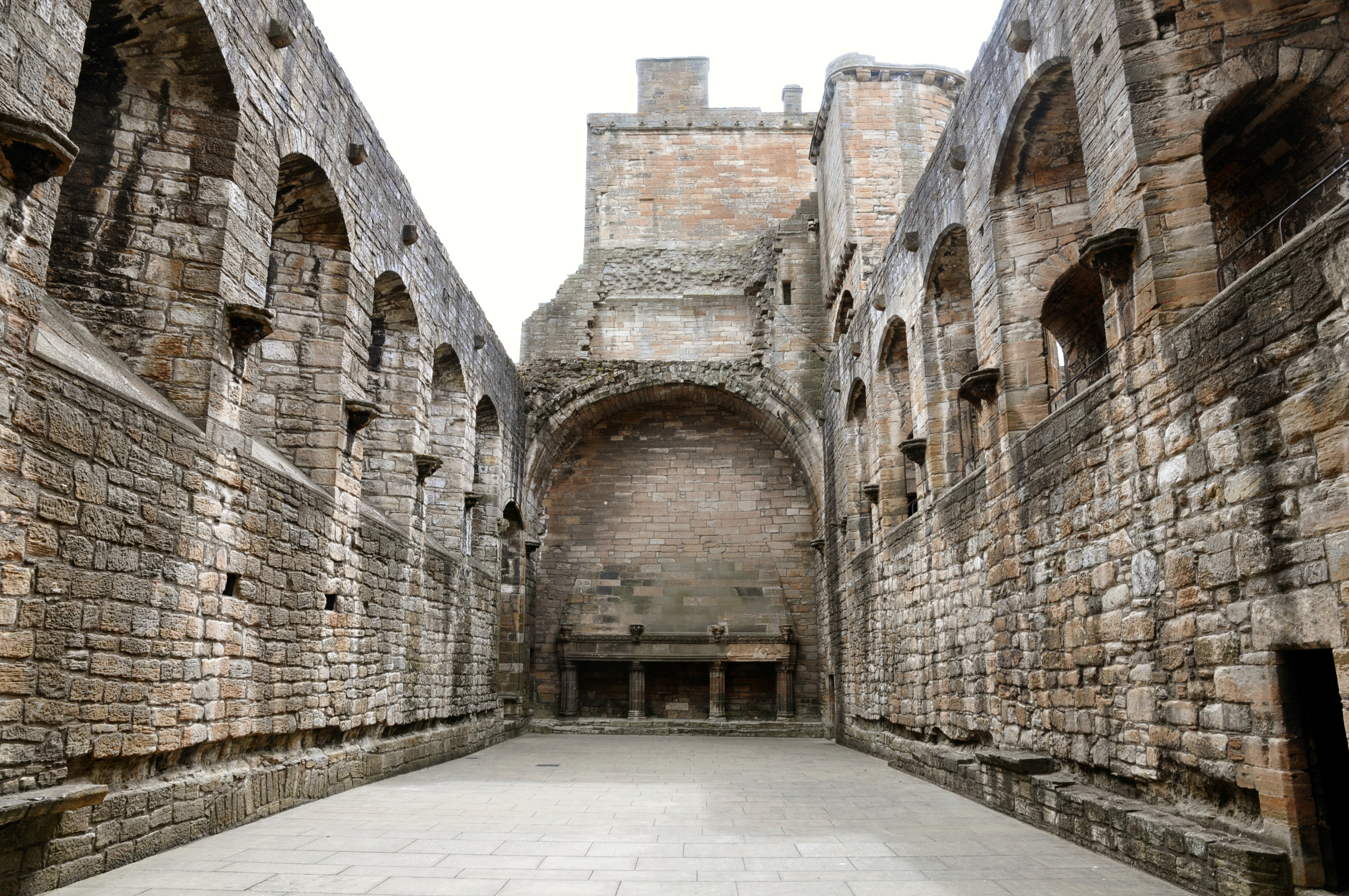
"Rob Gibb's chair" at Linlithgow Palace commemorated the courtier

In May 1528 James V joined his mother Margaret Tudor at Stirling Castle, escaping from the Douglas family. Traditionally, as described by Robert Lindsay of Pitscottie, the king rode to Stirling early in the morning from Falkland Palace before the household was awake. Pitscottie's chronicle names the king's helpers in the stable as Jockie Hairt and Zacharie Harcar. The details are uncertain, an English report mentions the king rode from Edinburgh in disguise with six horses. It is supposed that Robert Gibb facilitated this escape.

Gibb's work at court was concerned with the management of the royal stable, the king's horses, and his travel. Records of the royal court mention that he was a bought a "great coffer" for the horse harness and the horses' caparison cloths. He kept the accounts of payments to the blacksmith Thomas Sprotty, the metal worker Andrew Lorimer who made horse bits and stirrups, and for sharpening and refurbishing the king's swords and polearms called "Jedburgh staves", and for the horse and jousting armour made for the king by William Smeberd.

Gibb was with Mary of Guise and Mary, Queen of Scots at Stirling Castle in June 1544.

Robert Gibb died in 1558.

== Legacy ==
A more recent tradition has identified him as one of the king's fools, but there is no evidence for this. This identification was promoted by Walter Scott in a story which includes an old saying or proverb, first published in 1721, "Rob Gibb's contract: stark love and kindness." No further context for this saying or its connection to the historical courtier is known, apart from that supplied by Walter Scott.

The idea of "Rob Gib" and firm loyalty, seems to have become an ideal in Scotland, and his name appeared with an image of clasped hands on objects such as snuff boxes. MacDonald of Kingsburgh gave a "Rob Gib" snuff box to Bonnie Prince Charlie.

A recess in the corner of the roofless great hall at Linlithgow Palace was known as "Rob Gibb's chair", in connection with stories of the local laird and courtier.

== Marriage and family ==
Robert Gibb married Elizabeth Schaw. Their children included:

- James Gibb of Carriber
- George Gibb
- Robert Gibb, coroner of Edinburgh, (d. 1581).
- John Gibb (c.1550-1628) of Knock, a bedchamber servant of James VI and I
- Patrick Gibb, a burgess in Linlithgow
- Janet Gibb
- Isobel Gibb
- Elizabeth Gibb (d. 1595), servant of Anne of Denmark and wife of the courtier and tutor of James VI, Peter Young
