= Thomas Livingston (bishop) =

Thomas Livingston (alternatively, Thomas de Levinstone or Thomas Livingstone) was a fifteenth-century Scottish cleric, diplomat, and delegate at the Council of Basel and advisor to Kings James I and James II of Scotland. He was additionally Abbot-elect of Newbattle, Abbot of Dundrennan, nominal Bishop of Dunkeld, and also held the Abbey of Coupar Angus in commendam.

Thomas was an illegitimate son of a Scottish lord, probably Sir John Livingston, baron of Callendar. He was born either in the year 1390 or in 1391. In his early twenties he became a student of the new University of St Andrews, graduating with an MA in 1415. Thomas remained there for a few years teaching in the Faculty of Arts before embarking on a career as a Cistercian monk. In 1422 he was elected Abbot of Newbattle, but failed to hold the position because the Pope had already chosen another man, David Croyse. While remaining a Newbattle monk, the following year Thomas entered the University of Cologne in order to become a Master of Theology, which he attained in 1425. Thomas also became a priest, in addition to remaining a monk.

By 1429 at least Thomas was holding the position of Abbot of Dundrennan, but was suffering from severe sight problems. He appears to have obtained from the Pope a dispensation for his "defect of birth", being an illegitimate son, allowing him to remain in office. At this point in time Thomas joined the Council of Basel convoked by Pope Martin V. Thomas was able to advise King James I of Scotland on the issues and helped convince him to send a full delegation. Thomas became one of the most important men at the council and in 1439 it was Thomas, helped by the archdeacon of Metz, who delivered the council report in June which led to the deposition of Pope Eugene IV. In the following August, Thomas travelled to Mainz to attend the Imperial Diet, where he defended the council's decision to depose Eugene, and later became one of the men selected to choose a new Pope, Pope Felix IV/V (previously Amadeus VIII, Duke of Savoy). Thomas became one of the main supporters of the new pope, and was rewarded with a provision to the Bishopric of Dunkeld in November 1440. Although conciliarism looked doomed by the early 1440s, Thomas nevertheless remained an ardent conciliarist, and helped shape Scottish politics as an adviser during the minority of King James II of Scotland. In 1447 Pope Eugene died, and Livingston was one of the two Basel delegates who went to Vienna to attempt to persuade Frederick III, Holy Roman Emperor to convoke a new council of the church.

After the schism caused by the election of Antipope Felix V was finally healed in 1447, the blind Livingston turned his attention to promoting monastic reform, working alongside Cardinal Nikolaus von Kues (a friend of his from university) in the latter's mission in Germany (1451-2). He later returned to Scotland and resumed his role as an advisor to James II. Thomas was never bishop of Dunkeld in anything but name, so had no revenue, although King James did make him Abbot of Coupar Angus in commendam. Thomas died some time before 10 July 1460, at the age of seventy.

Religious titles
Preceded by Thomas de Langlandis	Abbot-elect of Newbattle; Elect 1422	Succeeded by David Croyser
Preceded by Patrick MacMen	Abbot of Dundrennan; 1429-1431/54¹ ¹ Resigned position for a pension, 1431, but retained use of title until 1454.	Succeeded by Patrick Maligussal [Maxwell]
Preceded by James Kennedy (consecrated); Alexander Lauder (el.)	Bishop of Dunkeld² ² In name only. 1440–1460	Succeeded by James Bruce
Preceded by William de Blare	Abbot of Coupar Angus; 1457–1460	Succeeded by John de Hutton
