= John Murray, 1st Earl of Annandale =

Scottish politician and courtier

John Murray, 1st Earl of Annandale (died 1640) was a Scottish courtier and Member of Parliament.

== Career ==
He was known as John Murray of Lochmaben or Lincluden, and John Murray of the Bedchamber. John Murray was the 6th surviving son of Sir Charles Murray (d. 1605) of Cockpool, Dumfries and Margaret Somerville, a daughter of Hugh Somerville, 5th Lord Somerville.

He served as a page to Anne of Denmark before becoming a Groom of the Bedchamber to James VI of Scotland. In 1600 he was given a pension from the estates of Dundrennan Abbey. He moved to London with James in 1603 when he became James I of England at the Union of the Crowns. Murray became a conduit for Scottish royal business at court. A number of letters and petitions addressed to him survive in the National Library of Scotland.

Murray was rewarded with properties in England. On 22 May 1605 he was granted Plumpton Park in Hesket in the Forest of Inglewood, then regarded as part of Debatable Lands between Scotland and England. Thomas Musgrave of Bewcastle, the owner of Plumpton, resisted this grant. In October 1605 Murray was awarded a yearly pension of 200 marks, as a servant of the queen.

In July 1609 the king gave him £100 to repair an old priory, Guildford Black Friary, near the royal park at Guildford.

He was naturalised as a denizen of English in 1610. He became Keeper of the Privy Purse in 1611 in the place of Robert Jousie, a textile merchant and partner of the goldsmith Thomas Foulis.

Elizabeth Stuart, Queen of Bohemia wrote to him from Heidelberg in June 1613. Abraham Harderet brought the letter, which explained that she had been obliged to buy jewels from him to give as gifts at her wedding, many more than she could pay for, and he could show Murray the bills she had signed. She wanted to Murray to arrange it so the Chancellor of the Exchequer would pay Harderet. She would not trouble Murray or the king again, except only for her servants, and she sent a list of her household. Abraham Harderet was Anne of Denmark's jeweller, and had travelled with Elizabeth to Germany.

New lodgings were built at Whitehall Palace for Murray and the Marquess of Buckingham from 1617. They were distinct buildings, though both near the privy gardens.

In 1621 he became Member of Parliament for Guildford, and bought Tyninghame House in East Lothian from the Lauder family for 200,000 merks. In 1622 he was promoted to Gentleman of the Bedchamber. The Marquess of Hamilton praised him in a letter to the Marquess of Buckingham, writing that he "is a very safe man, and I must say a zealous servant of yours".

King James made him Lord Lochmaben and Viscount Annand in the peerage of Scotland then Charles I made him Earl of Annandale, also in the peerage of Scotland. In September 1623, Prince Charles came to his at Guildford on his return from the Spanish Match.

Murray continued as Groom of the Bedchamber to Charles I. He was also Constable and Keeper of Falkland Palace and the Lomond Hills. Andrew Murray of Balvaird advised him that the back galleries of the Palace were decayed in 1615. In 1639 Balvaird helped him repair the keeper's house at Falkland, called the Castlestead or Nether Palace of Falkland.

Many letters to Murray from Scottish correspondents survive, mostly on political and church business. He delivered letters from Francis Bacon to the king. William Couper, Bishop of Galloway asked him to buy saddles for his wife and daughter, because they were much cheaper in London. The lawyer Thomas Hamilton advised him about the ownership of a hoard of gold coins found by a tenant on his lands near Lincluden.

He married Elizabeth Schaw, niece of William Schaw, and lady-in-waiting to Anne of Denmark, and had with her a son and a daughter. His son James (d. 1658), later Earl of Annandale and Viscount Stormont, was baptised in the Chapel Royal at Holyrood Palace on 19 August 1617, William Couper preached and Anne Livingstone, Countess of Eglinton, presented the child.

He died in 1640.

Many of Murray's papers were transferred to the collection of James Balfour of Denmiln and are now held by the National Library of Scotland.

== Coat of arms ==
Coat of arms of John Murray, 1st Earl of Annandale
Crest An eagle with wings proper. Escutcheon Azure, a crescent between three mullets within a double tressure flory-counter-flory argent; and for difference, granted by King James VI. A canton argent, charged with a thistle vert, crowned or. Supporters Two lions argent, crowned or. Motto Noctesque diesque fidelis et presto

Peerage of Scotland
New creation	Earl of Annandale; 1625–1640	Succeeded by James Murray
New creation	Viscount Annand c.1622–1640	Succeeded by James Murray
Baronetage of Nova Scotia
Preceded by Richard Murray	Baronet (of Cockpool); 1636–1640	Succeeded by James Murray
