= Newton baronets =

Set index for Newton baronets

There have been six baronetcies created for persons with the surname Newton, three in the Baronetage of England, one in the Baronetage of Nova Scotia and two in the Baronetage of the United Kingdom.

- Newton baronets of Charlton (1620): see Puckering baronets of Charlton (1620)
- Newton baronets of Barrs Court (1660)
- Newton baronets of London (1661)
- Newton baronets of Newton (1697)
- Newton baronets of The Wood and Kottingham House (1900)
- Newton baronets of Beckenham (1924)
