= William Ayloffe =

William Ayloffe may refer to:

- William Ayloffe (judge) (c. 1535–1584), English judge of the Queen's Bench and father of the 1st Baronet
- Sir William Ayloffe, 1st Baronet (1563–1627), of the Ayloffe baronets, MP for Stockbridge
- Sir William Ayloffe, 3rd Baronet (1618–1675), of the Ayloffe baronets, Royalist army officer

== See also ==
- Ayloffe (surname)
