= John Ayloffe (disambiguation) =

John Ayloffe (c. 1645–1685) was an English political satirist executed for treason.

John Ayloffe may also refer to:

- Sir John Ayloffe, 5th Baronet (c. 1673–1730), of the Ayloffe baronets, English clergyman
- John Ayliffe (1676–1732), English jurist
