= Benjamin Ayloffe =

Benjamin Ayloffe may refer to:

- Sir Benjamin Ayloffe, 2nd Baronet (1592–1662), of the Ayloffe baronets, MP for Essex 1661–1662
- Sir Benjamin Ayloffe, 4th Baronet (1631–1722), of the Ayloffe baronets, English merchant

== See also ==
- Ayloffe (surname)
