= Ayloffe =

Ayloffe is a surname. Notable people with the surname include:

- Ayloffe baronets
- Benjamin Ayloffe, multiple people
- John Ayloffe (c.1645–1685), English lawyer, political activist, and satirist
- William Ayloffe (disambiguation), multiple people

== See also ==
- Ayliffe
