= John Ferrers =

John Ferrers may refer to:

- John Ferrers (died 1680), Member of Parliament (MP) for Derbyshire
- John Ferrers (died 1622), MP for Tamworth
- John Ferrers (died 1633), MP for Tamworth

== See also ==
- John de Ferrers (disambiguation)
