= John Puckering =

British lawyer and politician (1544–1596)

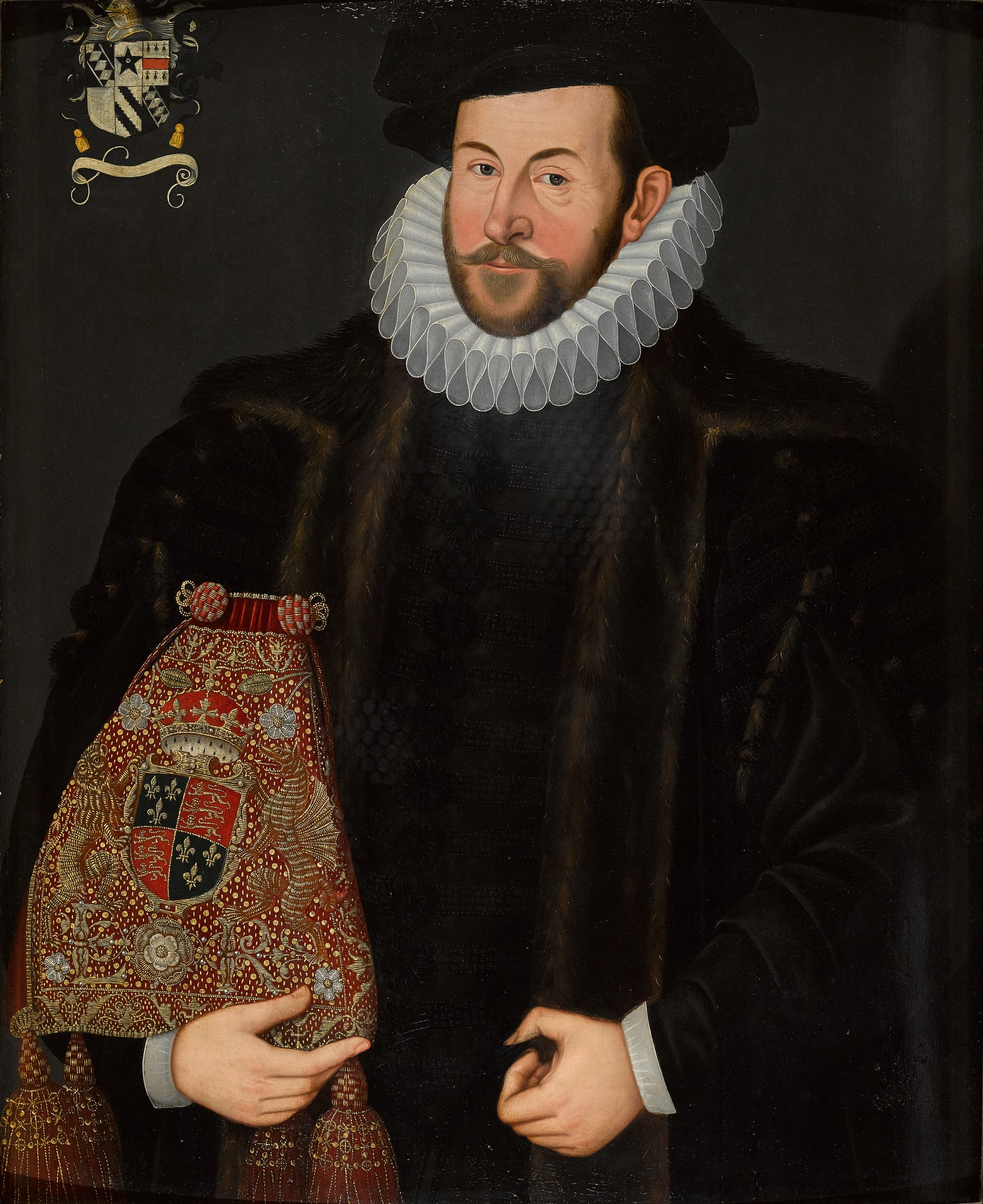
Sir John Puckering, holding the Lord Keeper's Purse embroidered with the royal arms of Queen Elizabeth I. The shield above of 6 quarters shows 1: Puckering; 2: Ashton

Sir John Puckering (1544 – 30 April 1596) was a lawyer and politician who served as Speaker of the House of Commons and Lord Keeper of the Great Seal from 1592 until his death.

== Origins ==
He was born in 1544 in Flamborough, East Riding of Yorkshire, the eldest son of William Puckering of Flamborough, by his wife Anne Ashton, daughter and heiress of John Ashton of Great Lever, Lancashire.

== Career ==
He entered Lincoln's Inn on 10 April 1559 and was called to the bar on 15 January 1567. After some years' practice, he became a governor in 1575, and in 1577 became an elected reader in Lent. He became a sergeant at law in 1580.

== Work in Parliament ==
Puckering became a Member of Parliament in 1581. On 23 November 1585, Parliament met and elected Puckering, who was returned for Bedford, as Speaker of the House of Commons. During this Parliament, a bill against Jesuits was brought up for discussion. Dr William Parry, who was later executed for high treason, said the bill was "cruel, bloody and desperate". Puckering ordered him into the custody of the sergeant-at-arms for his use of language, and after some discussion, Parry apologised and retook his seat. Puckering's skill with dispute solving and speeches was recognised, and he was elected as the Speaker in the next parliament, which opened on 15 October 1586 when he represented Gatton, Surrey. This was the parliament that decided the fate of Mary, Queen of Scots, and Puckering was heavily involved with the decision.

On 1 March 1587, shortly following Mary's execution, MP Peter Wentworth asked Puckering to answer some questions regarding the liberties of the House. Puckering refused, but showed one of the questions to Sir Thomas Heneage of the Privy Council. Wentworth, and four other members of parliament who seconded his motion were imprisoned in the Tower of London for an unknown length of time. The following year, Puckering was knighted and according to some sources was made Queen's Sergeant, though other sources claim he had been made sergeant two years before.

== Queen's Sergeant ==
Puckering took part in several trials as Queen's Sergeant. He was successfully leader for the crown in the trial of Philip, Earl of Arundel, who was accused of high treason. He joined in the commission with Judge Clarke, in July 1590 in the trial of John Udall who had published libel about the queen. His final trial was that of Sir John Perrot, the lord deputy of Ireland. On 28 May 1592, Puckering was made the Lord Keeper.

== Lord Keeper ==
Puckering was Lord Keeper for four years, but only presided over one Parliament. During this period, he lived at Russell House near Ivy Bridge, and then York House, both on the Strand. He also owned a country house in Kew, where he entertained the queen on 13 December 1595.

Some of Puckering's papers as Sergeant and Lord Keeper were printed by John Strype. These include interrogations of Catholic recusants like John Whitfield in 1593, who was involved with Francis Dacre in a plot for a Spanish invasion of Scotland, and the allowance of bread for the students of Christ Church, Oxford.

== Marriage and children ==
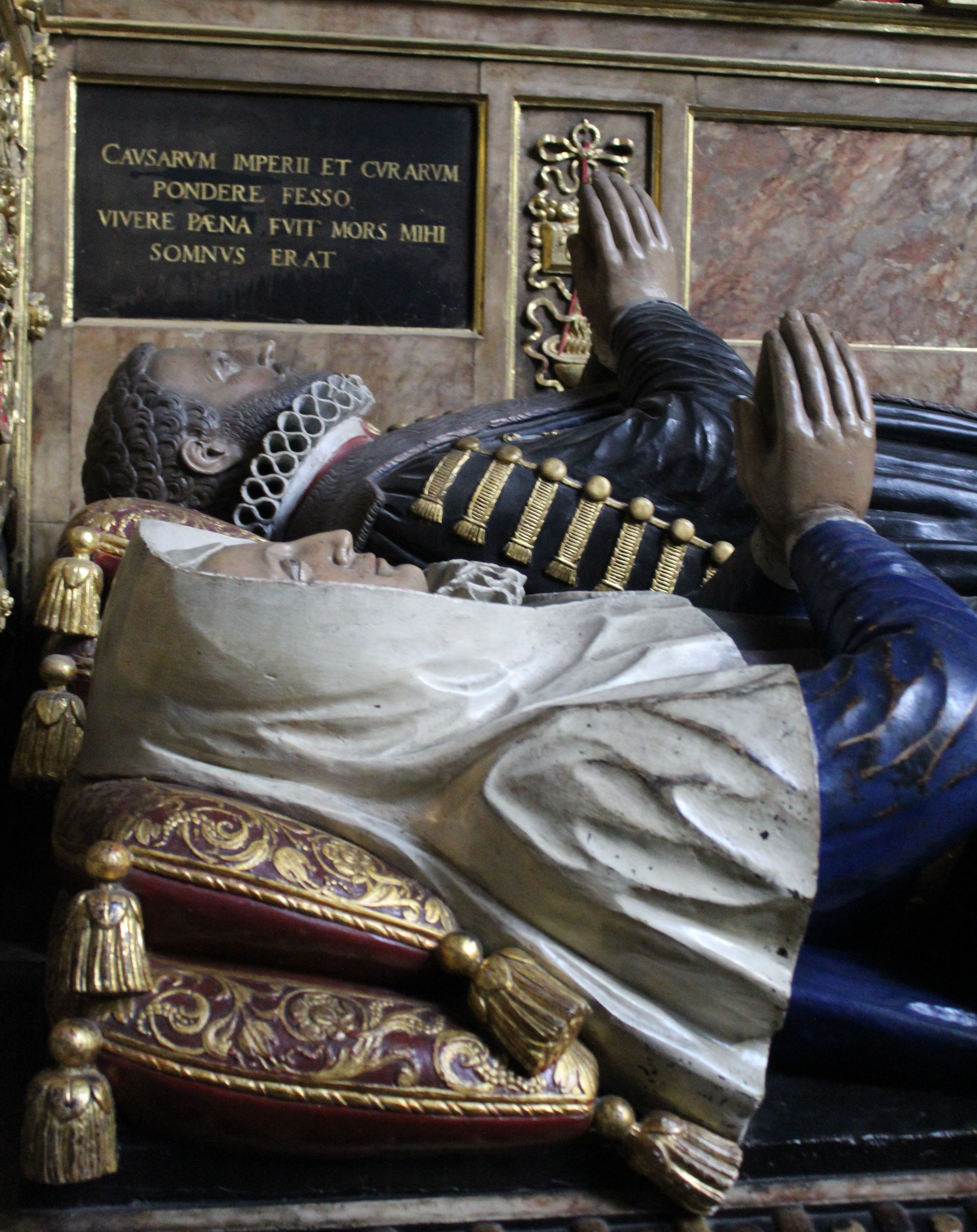
Detail of the monument to John & Jane Puckering, Westminster Abbey

He married Jane Chowne, a daughter of Nicholas Chowne of Fairlawn, near Wrotham, Kent, and Aldenham, Hertfordshire, by his second marriage to Elizabeth Lloyd, widow of Evan Lloyd, a brewer. By Jane he had several children, including:

- Sir Thomas Puckering, 1st Baronet (died 1636), son and heir, made a baronet in 1612. He married Elizabeth Morley, a daughter of Sir John Morley, of Halnaker in Sussex, but died childless. His monument survives in St. Mary's Church, Warwick. Thomas's epitaph records his involvement in the education of Henry, Prince of Wales. John's daughters included Catherine, who married Adam Newton, the tutor of Prince Henry. After Puckering's death, his widow Jane married William Combe, who with his nephew John Combe, sold land at Stratford to William Shakespeare in 1602. Jane was buried at St. Mary's, Warwick, on 15 July 1611.

== Death and burial ==
He died on 30 April 1596 of apoplexy, at his home, and is buried in Westminster Abbey, where survives his magnificent monument, displaying the arms of Chowne: Sable, three attires of a stag in pale argent.

== Bibliography ==
- Campbell, John (1869). The Lives of the Lord Chancellors and Keepers of the Great Seal of England. J. Murray.
- Chauncy, Henry (1826). The Historical Antiquities of Hertfordshire. Oxford University.
- Foss, Edward (1857). The judges of England, from the time of the Conquest. Longman, Brown, Green, and Longmans.
- Manning, James Alexander (1851). The Lives of the Speakers of the House of Commons. G. Willis.
- Paley Baildon, William (1896). The Records of the Honorable Society of Lincoln's Inn. H.S. Cartwright.

Political offices
| Preceded by Sir John Popham | Speaker of the House of Commons; 1584–1586 | Succeeded by Thomas Snagge |
| Preceded by In Commission | Lord Chancellor and Lord Keeper of the Great Seal; 1592–1596 | Succeeded by Sir Thomas Egerton |
