= Thomas Puckering =

English landowner, courtier and politician

Sir Thomas Puckering, 1st Baronet (1592 – 20 March 1637) was an English landowner, courtier and politician who sat in the House of Commons at various times between 1621 and 1629.

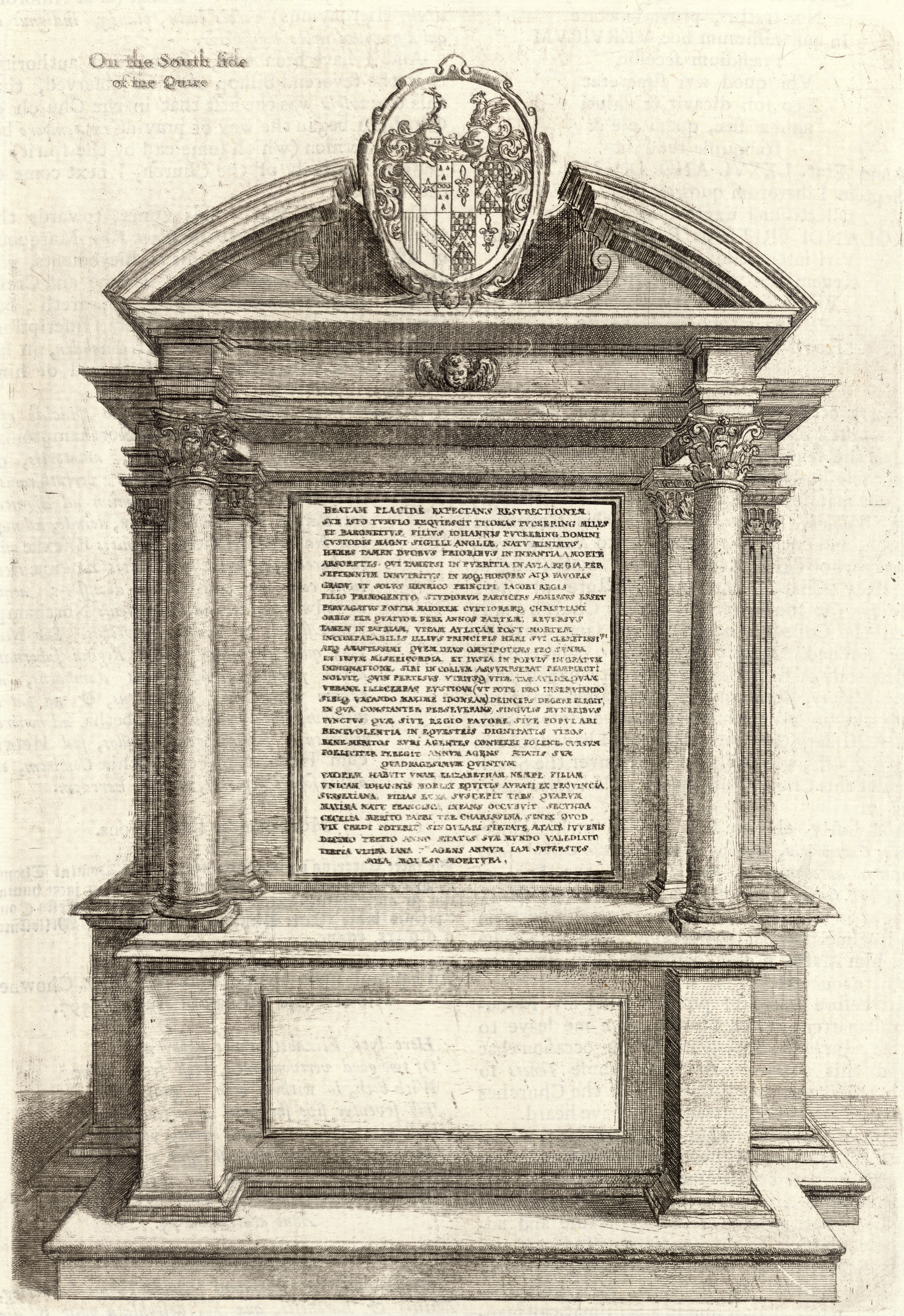
Monument to Thomas Puckering, 1639, St Mary's Church, Warwick, engraving by Wencelas Hollar

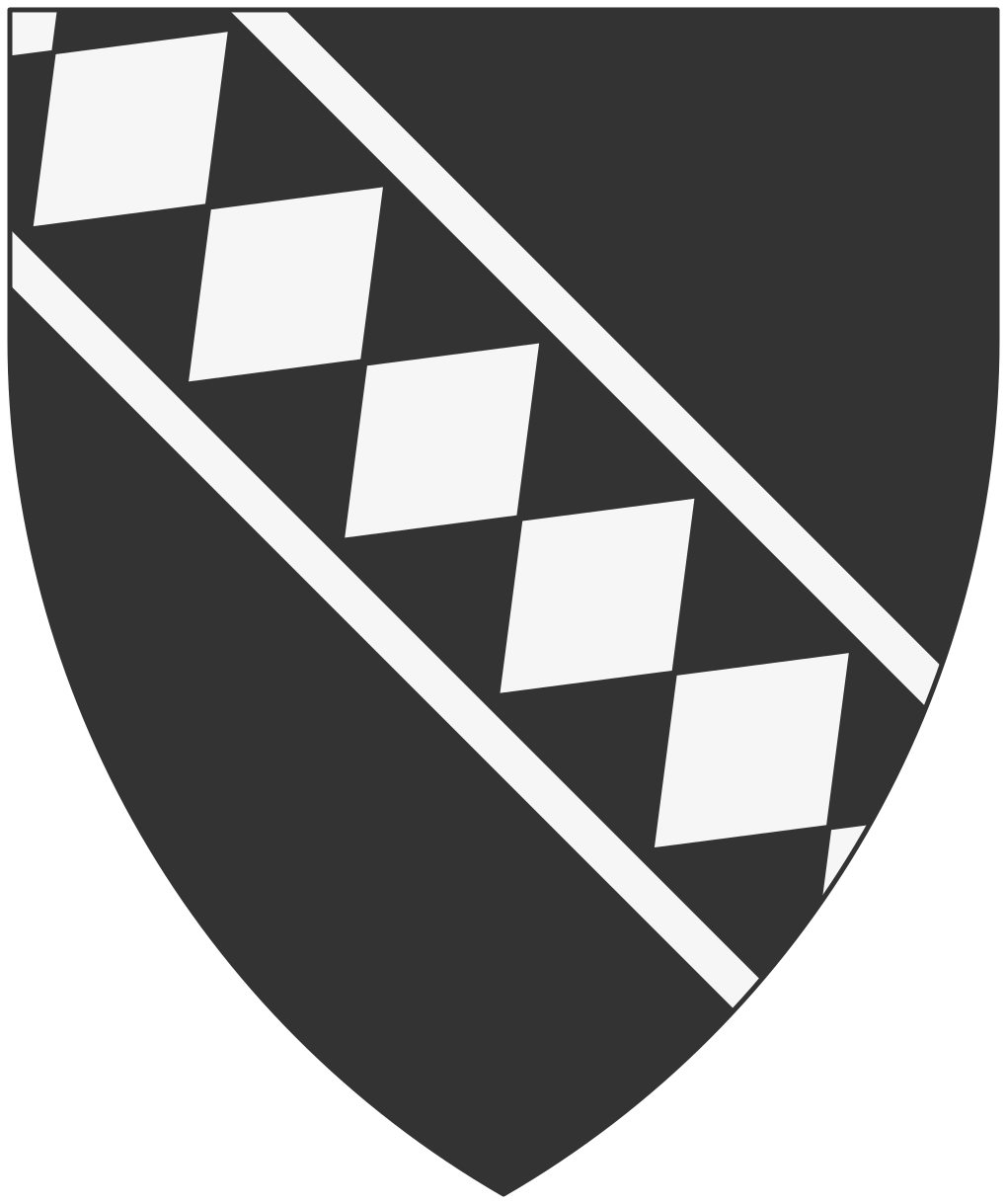
Arms of Puckering of Weston

Puckering was the son of Sir John Puckering and his wife Jane Chowne, daughter of George, or Nicholas Chowne of Kent. His father was Speaker of the House of Commons and Lord Keeper of the Great Seal. Educated at Warwick School, he succeeded to the family estates on the death of his father on 30 April 1596. After five years in the household of Henry Frederick, Prince of Wales, who was tutored by Thomas's brother-in-law, Adam Newton, in September 1610 he travelled to Paris, meeting the English ambassador Sir Thomas Edmondes. He was created baronet on 25 November 1611 and knighted on 3 June 1612.

In 1621 Puckering was elected Member of Parliament for Tamworth. He was Sheriff of Warwickshire in 1623. In 1625 he was elected MP for Tamworth again, and was re-elected in 1626 and 1628. He sat until 1629 when Charles I of England decided to rule without parliament for eleven years.

Puckering married Elizabeth Morley on 2 July 1616 at St Bartholomew the Less. She was the daughter of Sir John Morley, of Halnaker Sussex and his wife Cicely Carrill, daughter of Sir Edward Carrill of Hartinge. He had three daughters but was survived only by his daughter Jane.

Latterly, Puckering lived at his estate of the Priory, Warwick. He died at the age of 45 and was buried at St. Mary's Warwick. His tomb was built by Nicholas Stone. On his death the baronetcy became extinct.

There is a street in Warwick town centre named after him.

Parliament of England
Preceded by Sir Thomas Roe; Sir Percival Willoughby	Member of Parliament for Tamworth; 1621–1622; With: John Ferrers	Succeeded by John Woodford; John Wightwick
Preceded by John Woodford; John Wightwick	Member of Parliament for Tamworth; 1625–1629; With: Sir Richard Skeffington 1625; Sir Walter Devereux 1628–1629	Parliament suspended until 1640
Baronetage of England
New creation	Baronet (of Weston); 1611–1636	Extinct
Preceded by Gorges baronets	Puckering baronets of Weston; 25 November 1611	Succeeded by Ayloffe baronets
