= Joseph Ayloffe =

English antiquary (1708–1781)

Sir Joseph Ayloffe, 6th Baronet FRS, FSA (1708 – 19 April 1781, London) was an English antiquary.

== Life ==
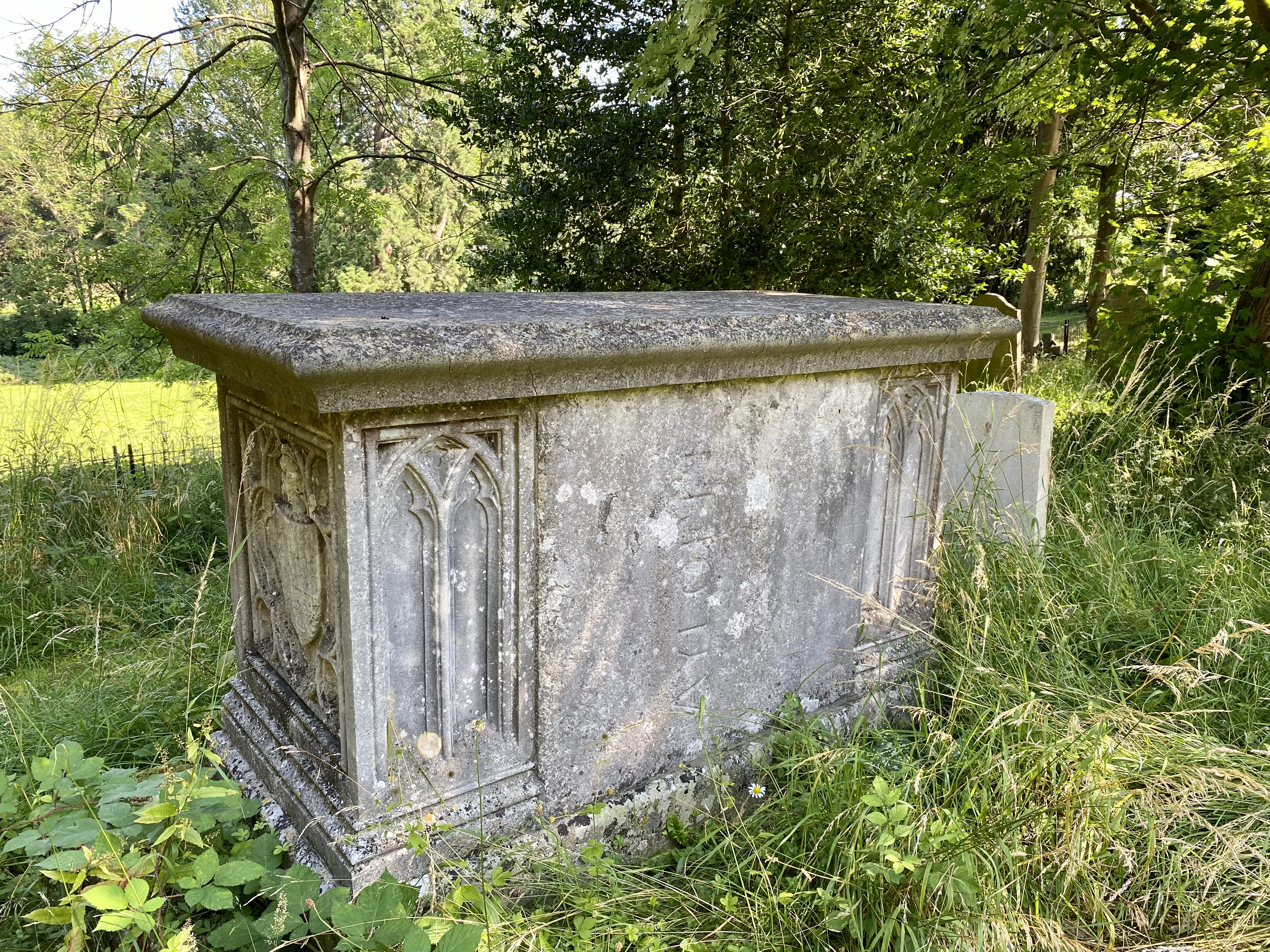
Ayloffe's tomb at St Mary's Churchyard in Hendon

He was the great-grandson of Sir William Ayloffe, 1st Baronet, through his third wife (Alice, daughter of James Stokes of Stoke near Coventry), their first son was Joseph Ayloffe, Joseph Ayloffe, barrister-at-law of Gray's Inn and sometime recorder of Kingston upon Thames, who died in 1726 and was this man's father.

Joseph was born in Sussex, and became 6th Baronet Ayloffe, of Braxted Magna; on his death, his baronetcy became extinct. Ayloffe was educated at Westminster School, admitted a student of Lincoln's Inn in 1724, and spent some time at St John's College, Oxford before 1728. In December 1730 he succeeded, as sixth in succession, to the family baronetcy on the death of his unmarried cousin, the Rev. Sir John Ayloffe, a descendant of the first family of the original holder of the title.

Sir Joseph seems early in life to have shown an interest in antiquities. He received at once the recognition of the learned, although for many years he was merely collecting information and published nothing. On 10 February 1731/1732 he was elected a fellow of the Society of Antiquaries, and on 27 May of the same year a fellow of the Royal Society. Seven years later he became a member of the well-known Spalding Gentlemen's Society, a literary club. But he did not confine himself altogether to antiquarian research. In 1736–1737 he was appointed secretary to the commission superintending the erection of Westminster Bridge; in 1750 he was auditor-general of the hospitals of Bethlehem and Bridewell; and in 1763, on the removal of the state archives from Whitehall and the establishment of a State Paper Office at the Treasury, he was nominated one of its three keepers. In 1751 Ayloffe took a prominent part in procuring a charter of incorporation for the Society of Antiquaries, of which he was for many years a vice-president. He frequently read papers at its meetings. Sir Joseph was the intimate friend of his colleague at the State Paper Office, Thomas Astle, and of Richard Gough; the latter described Ayloffe as the English Montfaucon.

Joseph Ayloffe died at Kensington on 19 April 1781 and with him the baronetcy became extinct. He had married about 1734 Margaret, daughter of Charles Railton of Carlisle, by whom he had one son, who died of smallpox at Trinity Hall, Cambridge, in 1766. Both father and son were buried in Hendon churchyard.

== Works ==
Ayloffe's published writings came later in life and were no great success with the general public. In 1751 he sent out proposals for printing by subscription the debates in Parliament before the Restoration in eight octavo volumes. Little favour was apparently extended to the scheme. Although in 1773 it was advertised that the first volumes would soon go to the press, none appears to have been published (cf. Rawlinson MSS. in the Bodleian, s. v. 'Ayloffe'). Also in 1751, Sir Joseph issued a prospectus for subscribers to a translation of Diderot's and D'Alembert's Encyclopédie, with additional or expanded articles on subjects of English interest, but the first number, published on 11 June 1752, obtained scanty support and was severely handled in the Gentleman's Magazine (xxii. 46), so that the project was abandoned.

Some years previously, Ayloffe had induced Joshua Kirby, a well-known draughtsman of Ipswich, to prepare some engravings of the chief buildings and monuments in Suffolk. Twelve of them were published with descriptive letterpress by Ayloffe in 1748. It was Ayloffe's intention to introduce Kirby's drawings into an elaborate history of the county upon which he was apparently engaged for the succeeding 15 years. In 1764 he had made such progress in collecting and arranging his materials that he issued a lengthy prospectus for publication of an exhaustive Topographical and Historical Description of Suffolk, but sadly he again received too little encouragement to warrant him in pursuing the plan further.

Subsequently, Ayloffe contributed several memoirs to Archæologia, the journal of the Society of Antiquaries, which were highly valued at the time. On 25 February 1763 he "communicated" an interesting Copy of a Proclamation (1563) relating to Persons making Portraits of Queen Elizabeth (ii. 169–170). In 1773 and 1774 there appeared in Archæologia (iii. 185–229,2.39-272, 376–413) three papers by him, describing:

- A picture at Windsor of the famous interview in 1520 between Henry VIII and Francis I
- Four pictures at Cowdray near Midhurst, the property of Lord Montague, illustrating Henry VIII's wars in France in the latter part of his reign
- The opening of the tomb of Edward I at Westminster in 1774, an exhumation that Ayloffe with Daines Barrington superintended.

Another paper prepared for the Society of Antiquaries, On Five Monuments in Westminster Abbey, was published separately, with engravings, in 1780. An account of the chapel on London Bridge, by Ayloffe, was published with a drawing by George Vertue in 1777.

In 1772 Ayloffe published a work for which he is still known to history students: Calendars of the Ancient Charters, and of the Welsh and Scottish Rolls, Now Remaining in the Tower of London... to Which are Added Memoranda Concerning the Affairs of Ireland [and an] Account of the State of The Public Records [etc.]. London, 1774. This, with an introduction attributed mainly to Thomas Astle, traces the history and neglect of the Public Records. In a long introduction, Ayloffe pressed for scholarly research among the state papers. The book was begun by the Rev. Philip Morant, who had been employed at the State Paper Office, and was published anonymously, but a reissue in 1774 had Ayloffe's name on the title-page.

Ayloffe also revised for the press new editions of John Leland's Collectanea (1771) and of the Liber Niger Scaccarii (1771), and added valuable appendices of original illustrative documents. He saw through the press John Thorpe's Registrum Roffense, which was published in 1769 by the compiler's son. Ayloffe's Collections relative to Saxon and English Laws and Antiquities remain in manuscript at the British Library (Add MS 9051). The whereabouts of his other manuscript collections have not been traced, numerous as they clearly were and stated by contemporaries to have been invaluable in relation to the abbey and city of Westminster. His library was sold by Leigh and Sotheby soon after his death.

== Notes ==
Baronetage of England
Preceded by John Ayloffe	Baronet (of Braxted Manor); 1730–1781	Extinct
