= Sir Louis Newton, 1st Baronet =

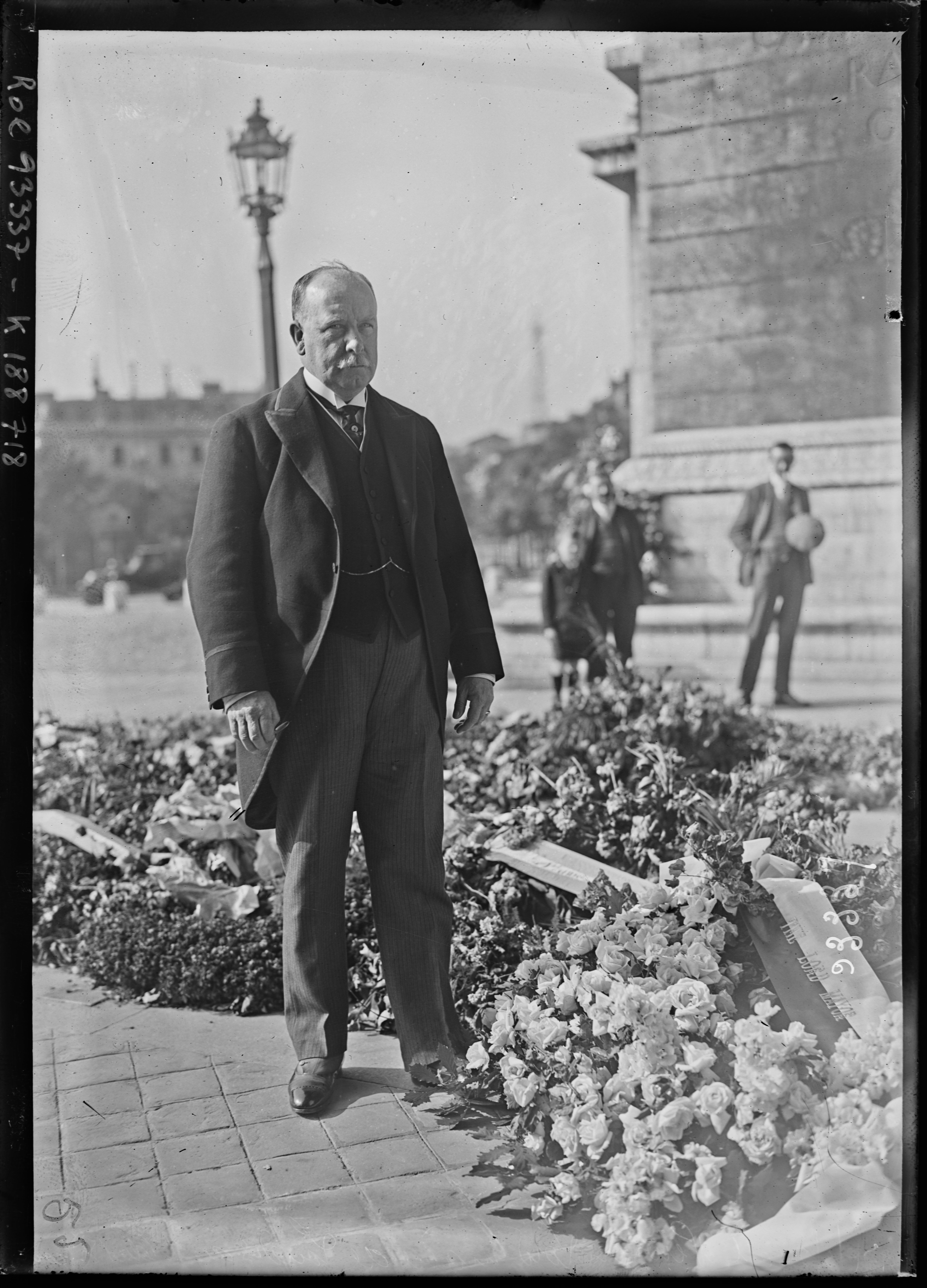
Sir Louis Newton, 1924 photograph

Sir Louis Arthur Newton, 1st Baronet (17 December 1867 – 17 April 1945) was Lord Mayor of London from 1923 to 1924.

== Biography ==
Newton was born in London, the son of Reuben Newton, of Macclesfield. He was a Lieutenant and Alderman of the City of London, and Senior Sheriff in 1917. He was Lord Mayor of London from 1923 to 1924.

Newton was a member of the London County Council from 1931 to 1934 and High Sheriff of Kent in 1940.

== Honours ==
Newton was knighted in 1917 and created a Baronet, of Beckenham in the County of Kent, in 1924. He was Grand Cordon of the Order of the Star of Romania, Grand Officer of the Order of the Crown of Italy, of the Order of the White Lion of Czechoslovakia, and of the Order of Leopold II of Belgium.

== See also ==
- Newton baronets
