= Ayliffe =

Ayliffe is an English surname. Notable people with this surname include:

- Graham Ayliffe (1926–2017), British microbiologist
- John Ayliffe (1676–1732), English jurist expelled from Oxford University
- Royce Ayliffe (born 1956), Australian professional rugby league footballer
- Thomas Hamilton Ayliffe (1774–1852) and family, early settlers of South Australia

== See also ==
- Ayliffe technique, a hand washing technique
