= Newton baronets of Beckenham (1924) =

Baronetcy in the United Kingdom

Escutcheon of the Newton baronets of Beckenham

The Newton baronetcy, of Beckenham in the County of Kent, was created in the Baronetage of the United Kingdom on 27 October 1924 for Sir Louis Newton, Lord Mayor of London from 1923 to 1924. He was a member of the London County Council from 1931 to 1934.

== Newton baronets, of Beckenham (1924) ==
- Sir Louis Arthur Newton, 1st Baronet (1867–1945)
- Sir Edgar Henry Newton, 2nd Baronet (1893–1971)
- Sir Kenneth Garnar Newton, 3rd Baronet (1918–2008)
- Sir John Garnar Newton, 4th Baronet (born 1945)

The heir apparent is the present holder's son Timothy Garnar Newton (born 1973).
