= John de Ferrers =

John de Ferrers may refer to:

- John de Ferrers, 1st Baron Ferrers of Chartley
- John de Ferrers, 4th Baron Ferrers of Chartley

== See also ==
- John Ferrers (disambiguation)
