= John Ferrers (died 1622) =

English merchant, landowner and politician

John Ferrers (died 1622) was an English merchant, landowner and politician who sat in the House of Commons from 1621 to 1622.

Ferrers was the son of Roger Ferrers of Fiddington Gloucestershire and his wife Margaret Badger. He was a mercer of London. In 1621, he was elected Member of Parliament for Tamworth.

Ferrers died before October 1622 when his will was proved.

Ferrers was the father of Sir Henry Ferrers, 1st Baronet.

Parliament of England
Preceded by Sir Percival Willoughby; Sir Thomas Roe	Member of Parliament for Tamworth; 1621–1622; With: Sir Thomas Puckering	Succeeded by John Woodford; John Wightwick
