= John Kirby (topographer) =

English land surveyor and topographer

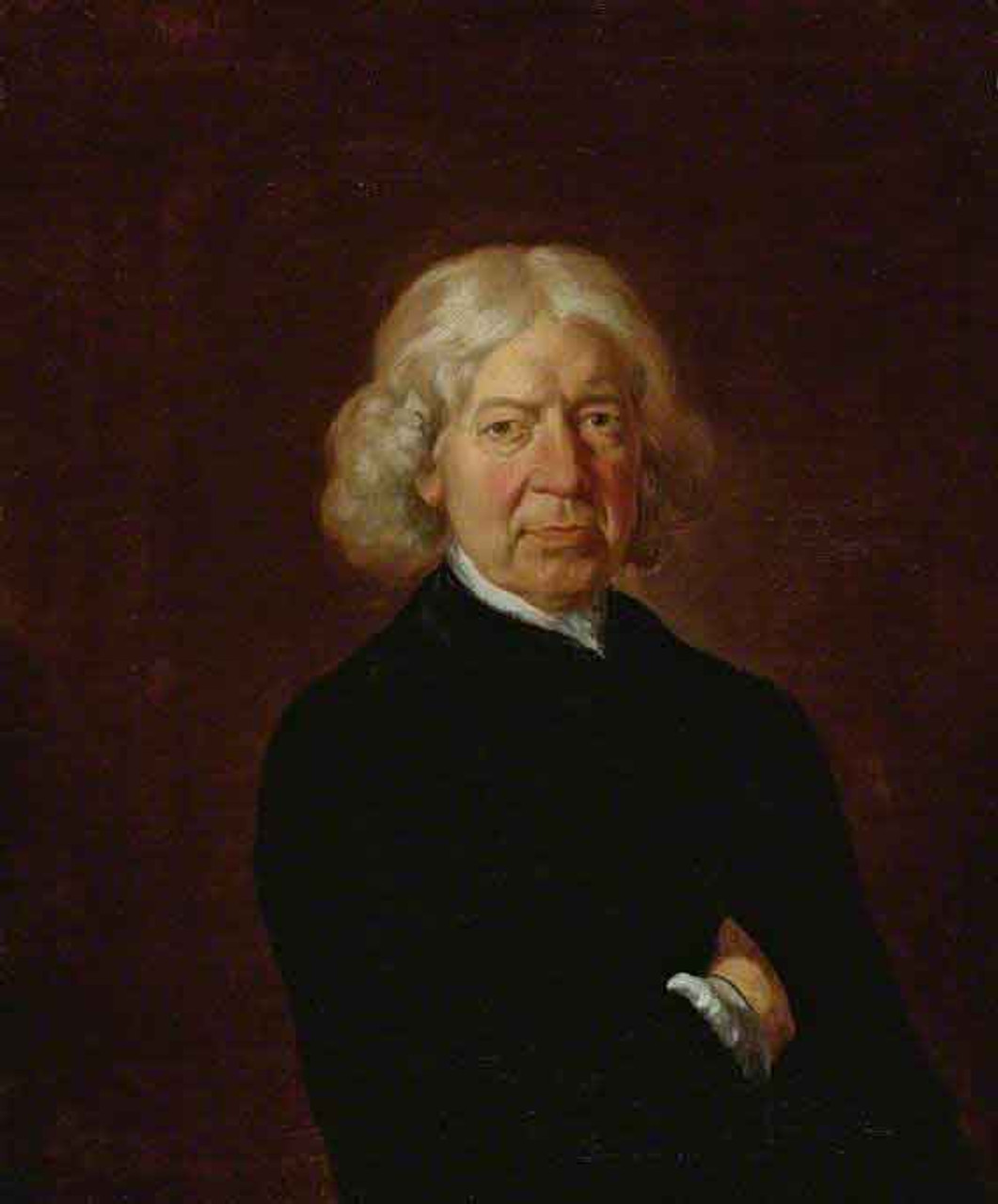
- Born: 1690; Halesworth, Suffolk, England
- Died: 13 December 1753 (aged 62–63); Ipswich, England, Great Britain
- Occupations: Surveyor and topographer
- Children: Joshua and 4 other sons

John Kirby (1690 – 13 December 1753) was an English land surveyor and topographer. His book The Suffolk Traveller, first published in 1735, was the first single county road-book.

Kirby lived in Wickham Market, Suffolk and spent three years between 1732 and 1734 surveying the entire county. For part of this project he was accompanied by Nathaniel Bacon. In 1736 he published a large-scale map of Suffolk. Subscribers to this received a copy of his book as a gift. A further large scale map was published the following year.

== Life ==
Kirby, born in 1690 at Halesworth, Suffolk, was originally a schoolmaster at Orford in that county, and afterwards occupied a mill at Wickham Market. In 1714, he married Alice Brown. Kirby died on 13 December 1753 at Ipswich, and was buried in the churchyard of St. Mary at Tower, Ipswich. His portrait, by Thomas Gainsborough, R.A., was by 1868 in the possession of the Rev. Kirby Trimmer.

== The Suffolk Traveller ==
In 1735, he published at Ipswich, in duodecimo, The Suffolk Traveller; or, a Journey through Suffolk, a road-book with antiquarian notices, from an actual survey which he made of the whole county in 1732, 1733, and 1734. Prefixed is a small map of the county. A new edition was published by subscription, with 'many alterations and large additions by several hands,' in 1764, 8vo, London, under the editorship of the Rev. Richard Canning, of which a reprint was issued from Woodbridge about 1800, containing some trifling additions, and a fourth edition, with additions, appeared as A Topographical . . . Description of the County of Suffolk, 8vo, Woodbridge, 1829, with Ebden's map in place of Kirby's. A Supplement to the Suffolk Traveller was published in 1844 by Augustine Page (cf. his Introduction, p. vi). In 1736 Kirby issued A Map of the County of Suffolk, illustrated with coats of arms and views. An improved edition, engraved by John Ryland, was published on a larger scale in 1766 by his sons Joshua Kirby and William Kirby.
