= Joshua Kirby =

English painter

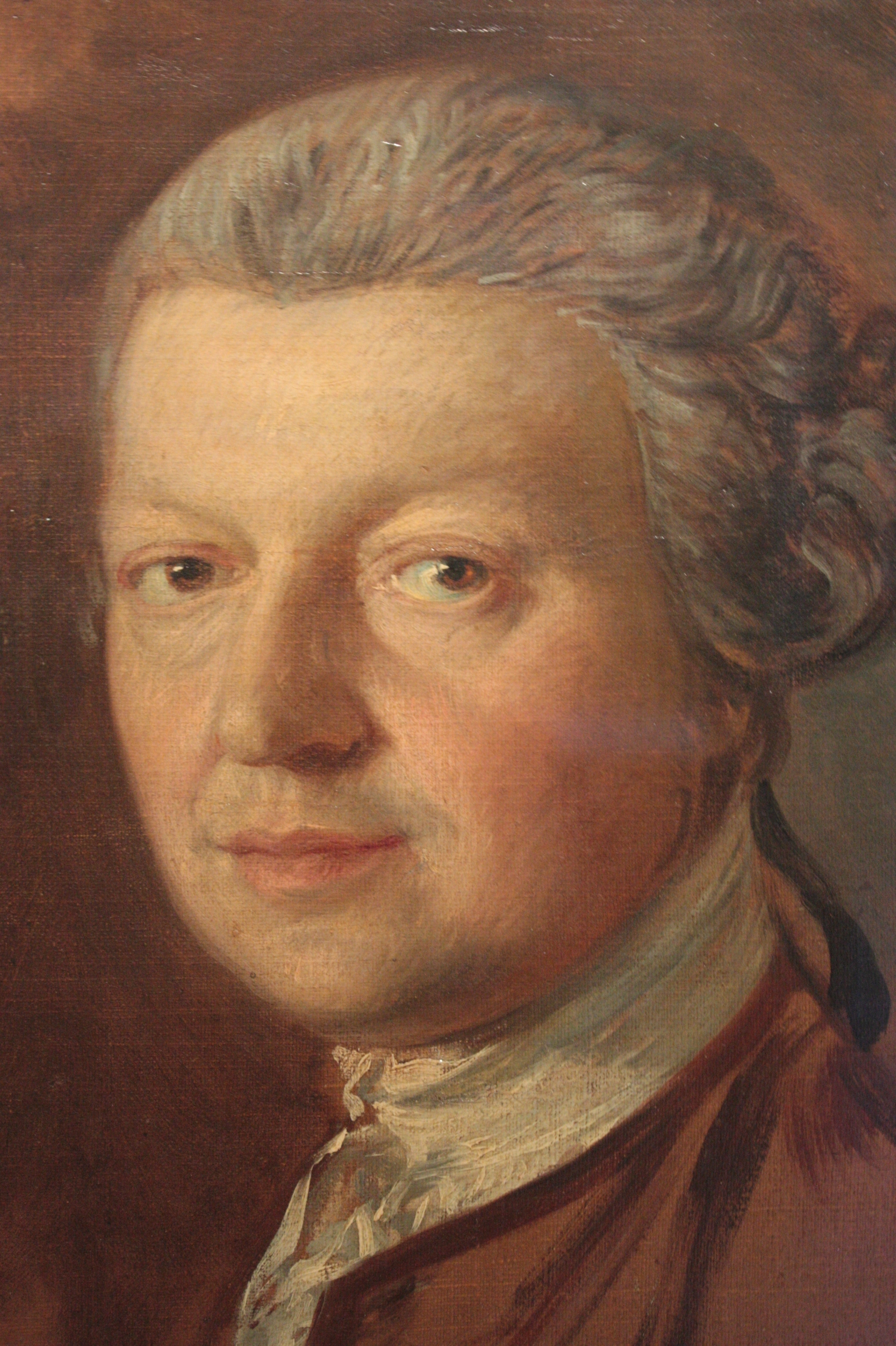
- Kirby by Thomas Gainsborough, c. 1755
- Born: 1716; Parham, England, Great Britain
- Died: 1774 (aged 57–58); London, England, Great Britain
- Children: Sarah and 1 son
- Parent: John Kirby

Joshua Kirby (1716 – 1774), often mistakenly called John Joshua Kirby, was an English 18th-century landscape painter, engraver, writer, draughtsman and architect famed for his publications and teaching on linear perspective based on Brook Taylor's mathematics.

== Biography ==
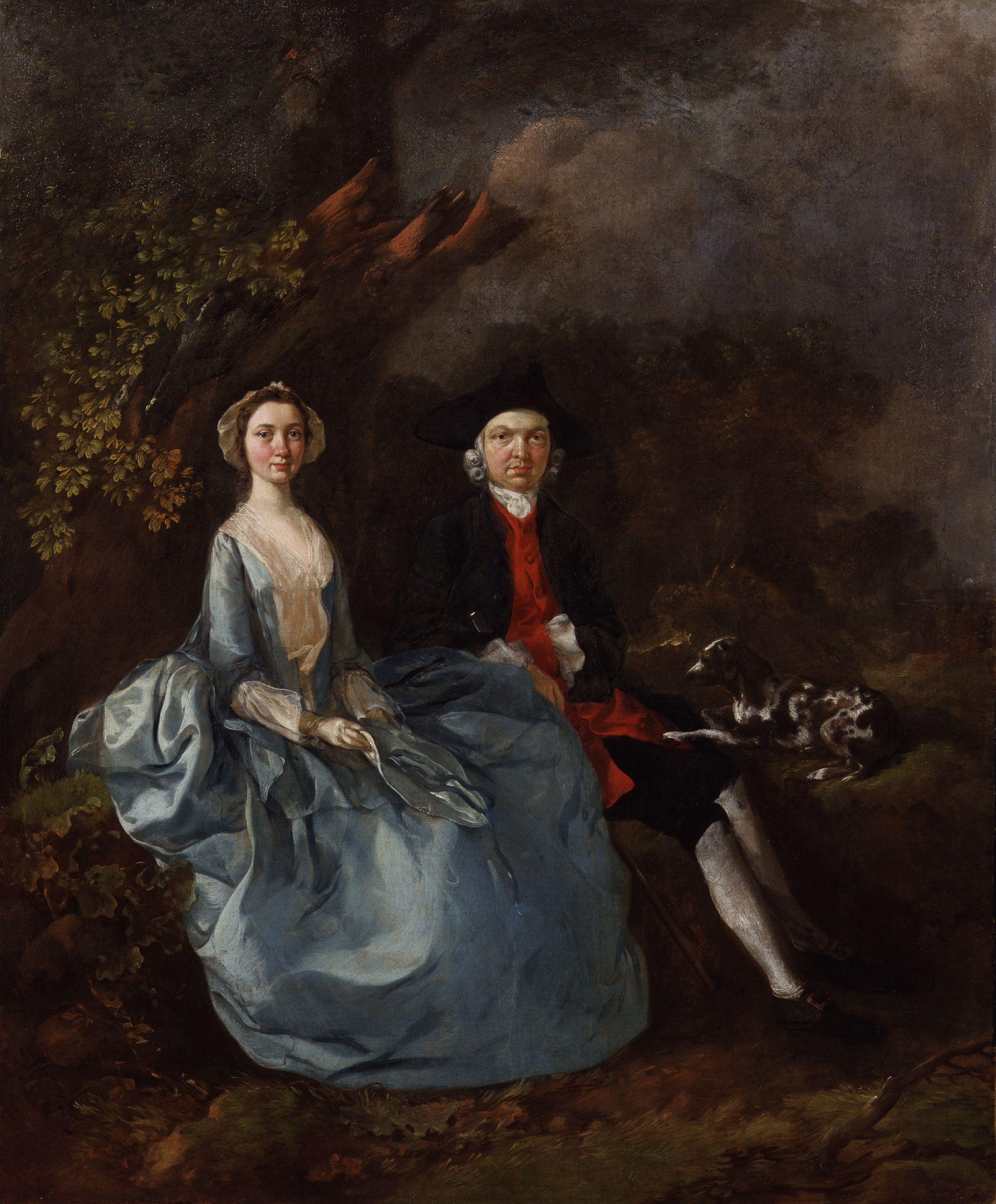
Sarah (née Bull) and Joshua Kirby, by Thomas Gainsborough.

Joshua was the second of five sons of topographer John Kirby. In early life, he assisted his father in the preparation of his important Survey of Suffolk, which took the form of a volume (1735) entitled The Suffolk Traveller, an extensive gazetteer in which the parishes and towns, and the principal landowners, seats, advowsons, antiquities and industries of the two counties of West and East Suffolk were described, the text counterpart of John Kirby's County Map published in 1736. In 1739, Joshua married Sarah Bull, and his children Sarah (afterwards Mrs. Sarah Trimmer) and William soon followed. From an early age he was very studious, but, showing special aptitude as an artist, he settled down to work as a painter in Ipswich and accepted commissions. He was particularly interested in Perspective, and began to prepare a Treatise on the subject before discovering the work of Dr. Brook Taylor.

Making the friendship of Thomas Gainsborough he became interested in landscape, and with the encouragement of the antiquary Sir Joseph Ayloffe (who was developing materials for an extensive History of Suffolk) he prepared illustrations of ancient buildings and monuments in the county. From these Kirby published a set of twelve engraved by J. Ford in 1748, dedicating each to individual patrons, with a descriptive pamphlet. Kirby also prepared illustrations for the History of Dunwich by Thomas Gardner, published in 1754. In 1751 he issued proposals for a quarto volume on Brook Taylor's Perspective, made easy, both in Theory and Practice, to have a frontispiece by William Hogarth. By its title Kirby claimed less than his share of credit for its originality. The first edition appeared early in 1754. In this period he frequently visited London. He was admitted an honorary member of Hogarth's instructional project, the St Martin's Lane Academy, where he lectured on perspective. By 1754, he had already received so much encouragement from distinguished artists that his first edition was over-subscribed, and, with 50 copper plates, a second issue was made the following year, price (to Subscribers) one guinea. Hogarth's Satire on False Perspective of 1753 was the frontispiece.

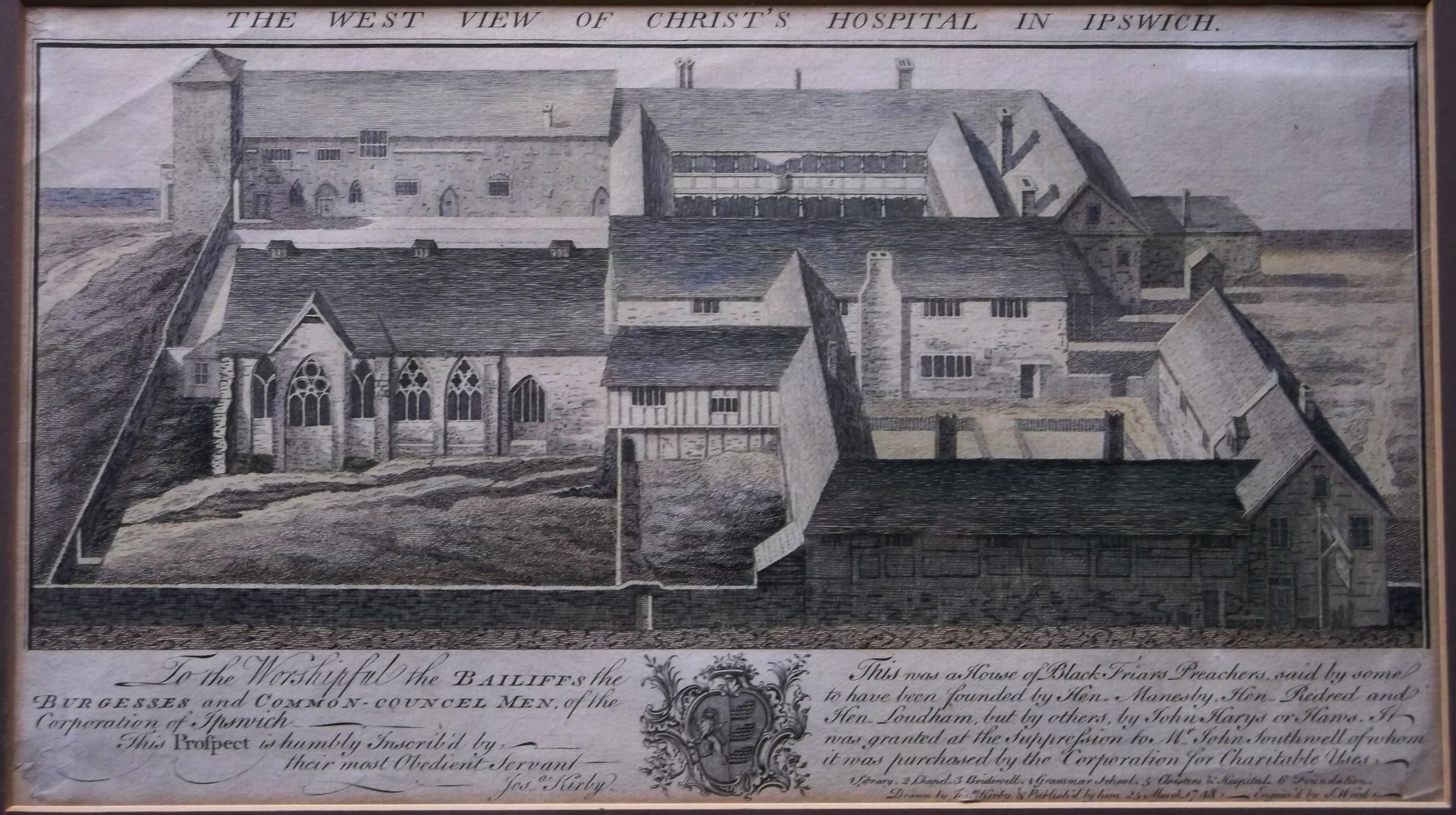
The Ipswich Blackfriars domestic range, from Kirby's Twelve Prints, 1748

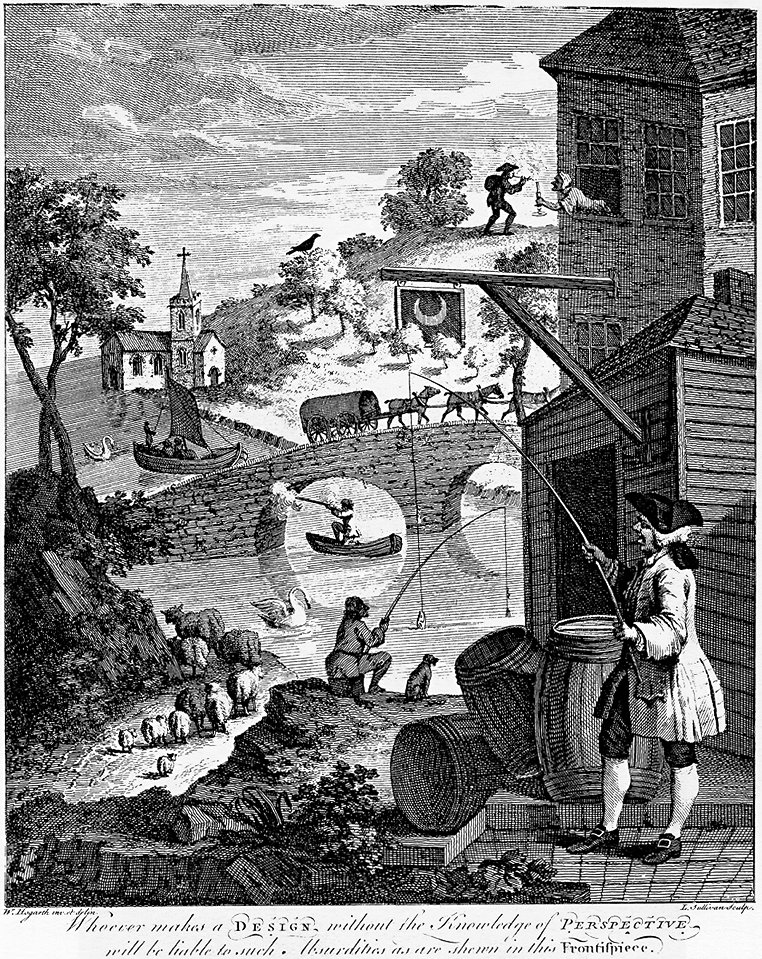
Satire on false perspective, showing all of the common mistakes artists make in perspective, by Hogarth, 1753

In 1755, Kirby moved to London, and was subsequently introduced by the Earl of Bute to the Prince of Wales (the future King George III), whom he instructed in linear perspective. The Prince thought so highly of him that he instructed Kirby to produce architectural illustrations, and with his liberal support in 1761 Kirby published them (including one by the Prince himself) in his masterly new two-volume work, The Perspective of Architecture. It embodied 'new principles for a complete system of the perspective of Architecture, both as it relates to the true delineation of objects, and the doctrine of light and shadow'. The first part described the use of the Architectonic Sector, an instrument invented by the Earl of Bute, and the second, 'a new Method of drawing the Five Orders, elegant structures, etc., in Perspective'. It was much admired. On his ascent to the throne His Majesty appointed Kirby Clerk of Works at Kew, in which his son William Kirby joined him.

In 1763, Joshua and his brother William Kirby (Attorney at Law, of Witnesham, Suffolk, and father of the Revd. William Kirby,) issued subscription proposals for a new edition of their father's work, and the second, enlarged edition of The Suffolk Traveller appeared in 1764 and the Map in 1766. He was elected a Fellow of the Royal Society in 1767, and also Fellow of the Society of Antiquaries. Fresh editions of the Method of Perspective made Easy were produced in 1765 and 1768, and this remained a popular standard work until superseded by that of Thomas Malton, published in 1771. From 1768 to 1771 Kirby was President of the Incorporated Society of Artists, a divided organisation in the decline of which the Royal Academy was planned and formed, in which he declined to accept a Professorship of Perspective.

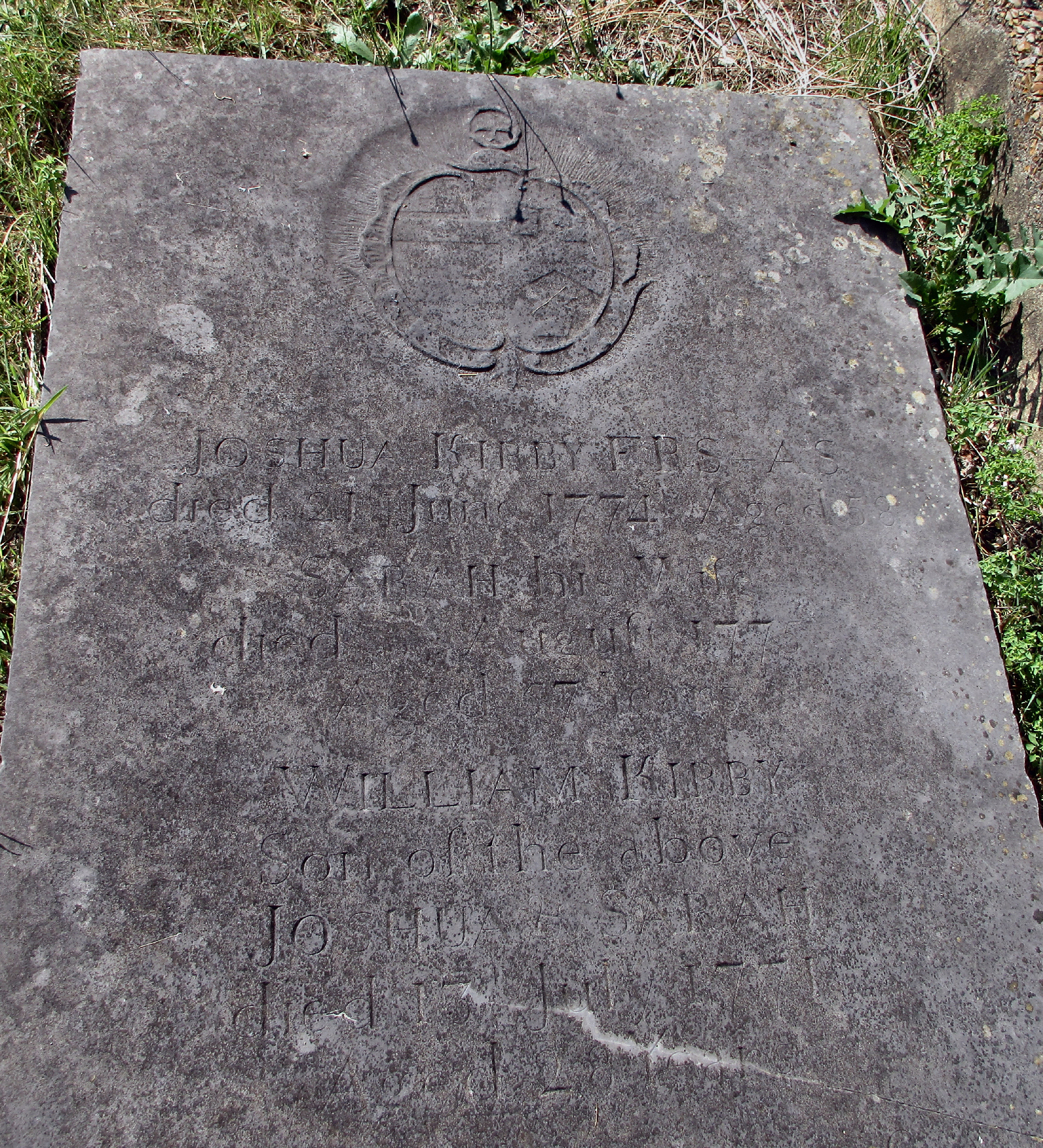
Grave at St Anne's, Kew

Kirby, a devout and somewhat modest man, had great pride in his son William, who was sent to Italy to study for three years 1768–71 at the King's personal expense, and returned full of promise. However William died suddenly, soon after his return to England. Joshua Kirby died at Kew, aged 58, in 1774, followed a year later by his wife, and both were buried in the churchyard of St Anne's Church, Kew. Thomas Gainsborough, who died in 1788, was buried nearby, having particularly requested to lie beside his old and faithful friend.

== Writings and publications ==
- An Historical Account of the Twelve Prints of Monasteries, Castles, antient Churches and Monuments, in the County of Suffolk, which were drawn by Joshua Kirby, Painter in Ipswich, and published by him 26 March 1748. (W. Craighton, Ipswich 1748).
- Dr. Brook Taylor's Method of Perspective Made Easy, Both in Theory and Practice. In Two Books. Being An Attempt to make the Art of Perspective easy and familiar; To Adapt it intirely to the Arts of Design; And To make it an entertaining Study to any Gentleman who shall chuse so polite an Amusement. By Joshua Kirby, Painter. Illustrated with Fifty Copper Plates; most of which are Engrav'd by the Author. (Ipswich 1754).
- The Description and Use of a New Instrument Called, An Architectonic Sector. By Which Any Part of Architecture may be Drawn With Facility And Exactness. (London 1761).
- The Perspective of Architecture. A Work Entirely New; Deduced From The Principles of Dr. Brook Taylor; And Performed by Two Rules only of Universal Application. Begun By Command of His Present Majesty, When Prince of Wales. By Joshua Kirby, Designer in Perspective to His Majesty. (London 1761).
- The Suffolk Traveller. By John Kirby, of Wickham-Market, Who took an actual survey of the whole County in the Years 1732, 1733, and 1734. The Second Edition, With large Additions and Amendments. Now Published by Joshua Kirby, and William Kirby, Sons of the Author. (1764)
- A New Map of the County of Suffolk: Taken from the Original Map published by Mr John Kirby in 1736. Who took an Actual and Accurate Survey of the Whole County; Now republish'd (with Corrections, & Additions) by Joshua and William Kirby, sons of the Author, 1766; And Engrav'd by Jno. Ryland.
- Dr. Brook Taylor's Method Of Perspective Made Easy; Both in Theory and Practice: In Two Books. Being An Attempt to make the Art of Perspective easy and familiar; To adapt it entirely to the Arts of Design; And To make it an Entertaining Study to any Gentleman who shall chuse so polite an Amusement. By Joshua Kirby, Designer In Perspective To Their Majesties. And Fellow of the Royal and Antiquarian Societies. Illustrated With Many Copper-Plates, Correctly Engraved under the Author's Inspection. The Third Edition, with several Additions and Improvements. (London 1768).

See also in:

- Chambers, William, R.A., Plans, Elevations, Sections, and Perspective Views Of The Gardens And Buildings At Kew in Surry, The Seat of Her Royal Highness The Princess Dowager of Wales. By William Chambers, member Of the Imperial Academy of Arts at Florence, and of the Royal Academy of Architecture at Paris, Architect To the King, and to Her Royal Highness the Princess Dowager of Wales. (London 1763)
