= Sir Benjamin Ayloffe, 2nd Baronet =

English politician

Sir Benjamin Ayloffe, 2nd Baronet (29 August 1592 – March 1662) was an English landowner and politician who sat in the House of Commons from 1661 to 1662. He supported the Royalist cause in the English Civil War.

== Biography ==
Ayloffe was the second son of Sir William Ayloffe, 1st Baronet and his first wife Catharine, daughter and coheir to John Sterne, of Melbourn, Cambridgeshire. His elder brother William died within the lifetime of his father so Ayloffe inherited the estates and the baronetcy on his father's death in 1627.

At the outbreak of the English Civil War King Charles I appointed Ayloffe High Sheriff of Essex. Consequently, he was imprisoned by Parliament, his estates being sequestrated and himself obliged to sell that of Brittains. He was fined, 29 May 1649, £2,000, increased to £3,000.

In 1661 Ayloffe was elected Member of Parliament for Essex in the Cavalier Parliament. He died in 1662 and was buried at Braxted.

== Family ==
Ayloffe married three times. Firstly, about 1611, to Alice, daughter of Martin Archdale. She died and was buried on 28 November 1612, at Hornchurch, they had no children. He remarried on 9 May 1616, at Barking, Essex, to Margaret (she was 5th daughter of Thomas Fanshawe, of Jenkins in Barking, remembrancer of the exchequer, and sister to Sir Henry Fanshawe). They had one daughter: Catharine, who married Thomas Hardwick, of Leeds, in Yorkshire and three sons:

- William, his son and heir;
- Benjamin, who succeeded to the baronetcy on the death of his brother;
- Henry, who had to wife, Dorothy (daughter and heir of Richard Bulkeley, of Chedle, in Cheshire), and was father to Sir John Ayloffe, of Stanford-Rivers, in Essex.

It has been claimed that a fourth son, John Aylett, emigrated to America based on a series of letters discovered by W.W. Fontaine among Aylett family papers in Virginia, the originals of which have disappeared. Noted genealogist Lothrop Withington commented that although these letters could be authentic, there are some strong reasons to suspect that they could have been forgeries that were planted to fool Fontaine, who was an avid family historian.

Ayloffe's third marriage was to Margaret, sister of George Porter. She remarried John Wall, of St. Clement Danes, Middlesex and died 1682.

== Notes ==
Parliament of England
| Preceded by Edward Turnor; John Baramston | Member of Parliament for Essex; 1661– 1662; With: John Baramston | Succeeded by John Baramston; Banastre Maynard |
Baronetage of England
| Preceded by William Ayloffe | Baronet (of Braxted Manor); 1627–1662 | Succeeded by William Ayloffe |
