= Puckering baronets of Charlton (1620) =

The Newton baronetcy, later Puckering baronetcy of Charlton in the County of Kent, was created in the Baronetage of England on 2 April 1620 for Adam Newton, Dean of Durham and tutor to Henry Frederick, Prince of Wales, son of King James I.

The 3rd Baronet changed his surname to Puckering on inheriting the estates of his great-uncle Sir Thomas Puckering, after the death in 1651 of Puckering's daughter Jane, who had married Sir John Bale, 1st Baronet. He was Member of Parliament for Warwickshire in 1661, and for Warwick 1679. He settled at Warwick Priory in 1656, and bought an estate at Woodcote, Warwickshire in 1657. The baronetcy became extinct on his death.

== Newton, later Puckering baronets, of Charlton (1620) ==
- Sir Adam Newton, 1st Baronet (died 1630), was a layman, despite his clerical position. He married Katharine Puckering, daughter of Sir Thomas Puckering, to whose son he was tutor, and bought the Manor of Charlton in 1607. He had built there the mansion Charlton House, by 1612.
- Sir William Newton, 2nd Baronet (died 1635)
- Sir Henry Puckering, 3rd Baronet (1618–1700). The name of the baronetcy changed to Puckering when he changed his surname. He left no heir.
