= Sir Benjamin Ayloffe, 4th Baronet =

Sir Benjamin Ayloffe, 4th Baronet (1631 – 5 March 1722) of Great Braxted, was a London merchant.

== Biography ==
Benjamin Ayloffe was born in 1631. He was the younger son of Sir Benjamin Ayloffe and his second wife, Margaret the 5th daughter of Thomas Fanshawe.

Ayloffe was a merchant in London, governor of the Russia Company from 1700, for the rest of his life; and was also active in local politics. In 1675, on the death of his elder brother Sir William Ayloffe, he inherited the baronetcy and family seat of Great Braxted. He died with no surviving children on 5 March 1722, aged 91. The baronetcy passed to his nephew (the son of his younger brother Henry), Sir John Ayloffe.

== Family ==
Benjamin Ayloffe married, 21 Sep. 1669, at North Ookendon, Essex, Martha, daughter of Sir John Tyrrell, of Heron, Essex, by his second wife, Margaret, daughter of Sir Laurence Washington. They had one son, John, who died about the age of twenty, unmarried; and two daughters, Margaret, married to the Rev. Mr. Jenks, Minister of St. Dunstan's in the West, London; and Martha, the wife of Mr. John Preston, of London, Merchant.

== Notes ==
Baronetage of England
Preceded by William Ayloffe	Baronet (of Braxted Manor); 1675–1722	Succeeded by John Ayloffe
