= Newton baronets of Newton (1697) =

Newton baronets
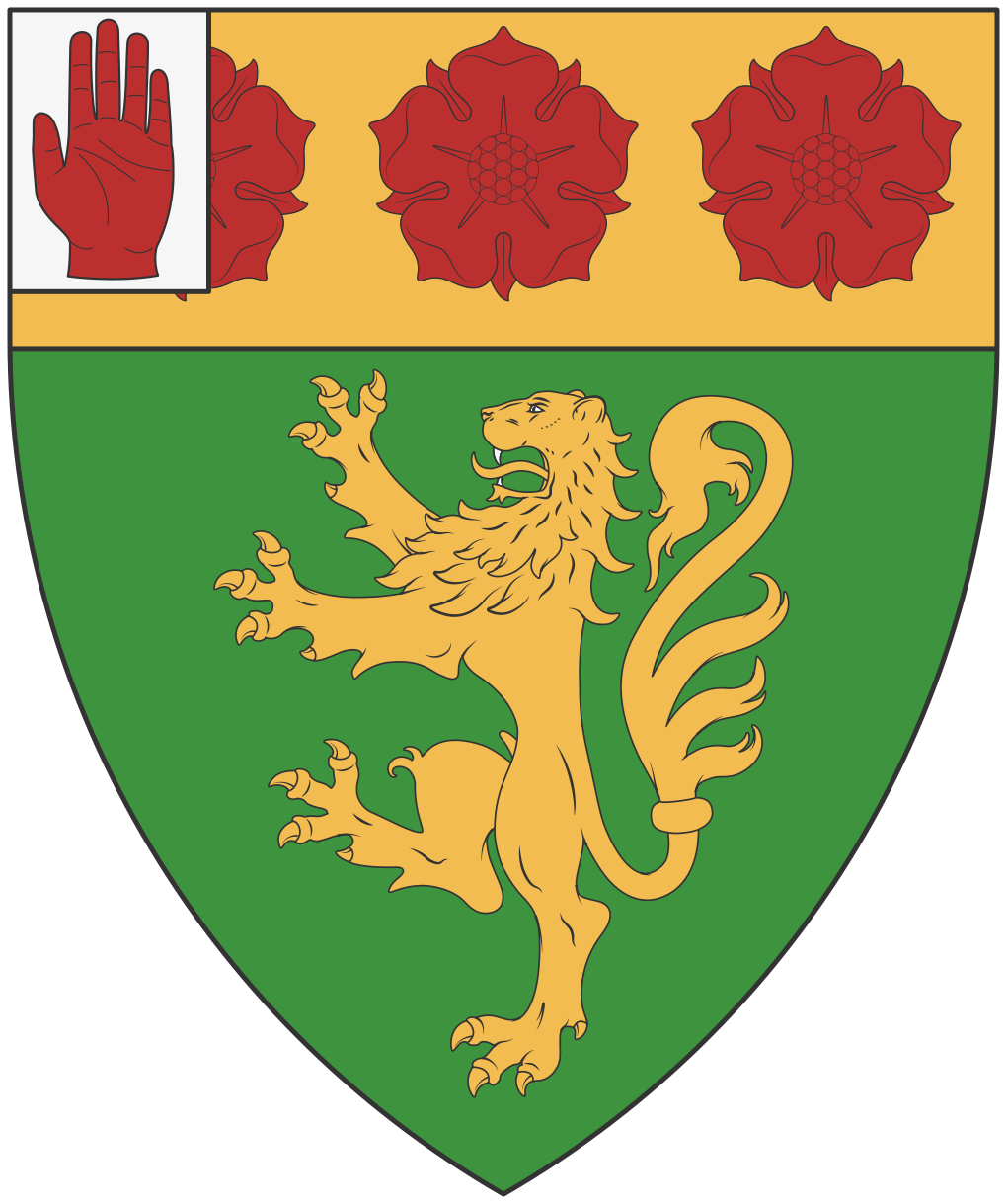
- Escutcheon of the Newton baronets of Newton
- Creation date: 1697
- Status: extinct
- Extinction date: c.1723
- Motto: Pro Patria, For my country
- Arms: Vert, a lion rampant or, on a chief of the last three roses gules
- Crest: A demi lion or, holding in the dexter paw a scymitar all ppr

The Newton baronetcy, of Newton in the County of Haddington, was created in the Baronetage of Nova Scotia on 23 April 1697 for Richard Newton. He was the son of Richard Newton and his wife Julian, sister of Patrick Hume, 1st Earl of Marchmont; the creation of Newton's title took place on the same day as Hume's earldom.

Newton married, by 1702, Helen Livingstone. She was the niece and heiress of Sir James Livingstone, 1st Baronet of Westquarter (died 1701). This marriage, however, did not bring Newton the Westquarter estate. The title became extinct on his death c.1727.

== Newton baronets, of Newton (1697) ==
- Sir Richard Newton, 1st Baronet (died c.1727), left no heir.
