= Newton baronets of Barrs Court (1660) =

Newton baronets
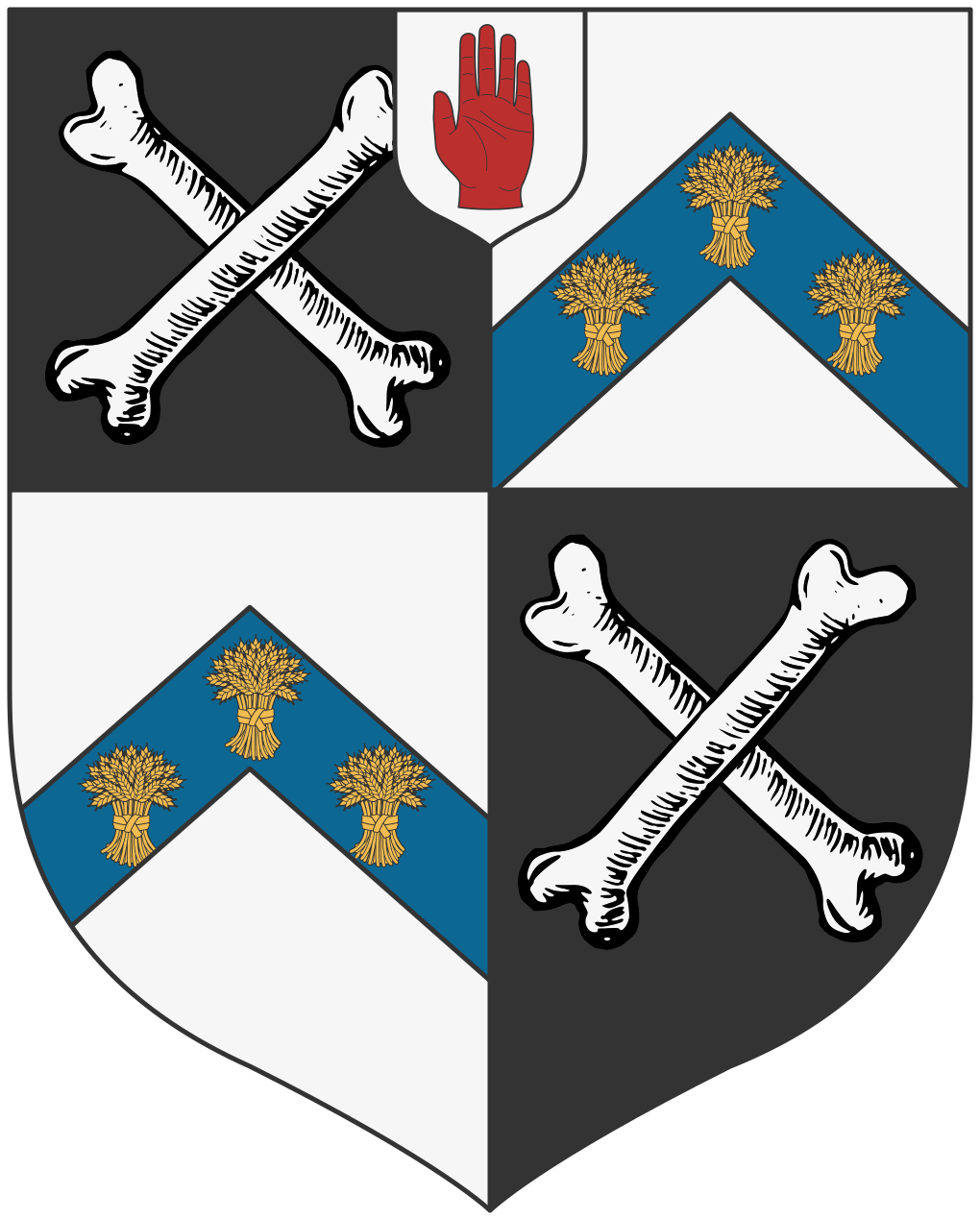
- Escutcheon of the Newton baronets of Barrs Court
- Creation date: 1660
- Status: extinct
- Extinction date: 1743
- Motto: Huic habeo non tibi, I hold it for him, not for thee
- Arms: Quarterly, 1st & 4th, sa. two shinbones saltireways, the sinister surmounted of the dexter ar., (NEWTON); 2nd & 3rd, ar. on a chev. az. three garbs or (CRADOCK)
- Crest: An eastern prince kneeling on the sinister knee, and presenting a sword all ppr.

The Newton baronetcy, of Barrs Court in the County of Gloucester, was created in the Baronetage of England on 16 August 1660 for John Newton. He received his baronetcy as reward for providing King Charles II with troops to defend the plantation of Ulster. The royal patent of 1660 had a special remainder: it stipulated that upon the death of the 1st Baronet, who was childless, the title would revert to a kinsman, John Newton, of Culverthorpe, in Lincolnshire. The arrangement, however, seems to have been a deal made with an unrelated John Newton.

The 2nd Baronet was motivated in his dealings by the projected exclusive knightly Order of the Royal Oak. He represented Grantham in five parliaments.

The 4th Baronet sat as Member of Parliament for Beverley from 1722 to 1727, and Grantham from 1727 to 1743. He married Margaret Coningsby, 2nd Countess Coningsby (see Earl Coningsby). He left no surviving male issue and the title became extinct on his death in 1743.

== Newton baronets, of Barrs Court (1660) ==
- Sir John Newton, 1st Baronet (c. 1611–1661)
- Sir John Newton, 2nd Baronet (1626–1699)
- Sir John Newton, 3rd Baronet (c. 1651–1734)
- Sir Michael Newton, 4th Baronet (c. 1691/2–1743)

=== Relationship to Isaac Newton ===
Shortly after he was knighted by Queen Anne in 1705, Isaac Newton submitted to the College of Arms a genealogy claiming a common male-line ancestry with Sir John Newton, 3rd Baronet. Later genealogical scholarship confirmed that they were third cousins.
