= Puckering baronets =

Set index for Puckering baronets

There were two baronetcies created for members of the Puckering family in the Baronetage of England. Both are extinct.

- Puckering baronets of Weston (1611): see Sir Thomas Puckering, 1st Baronet (died 1636)
- Puckering baronets of Charlton (1620)
