= Newton baronets of London (1661) =

Extinct baronetcy in England

Newton baronets
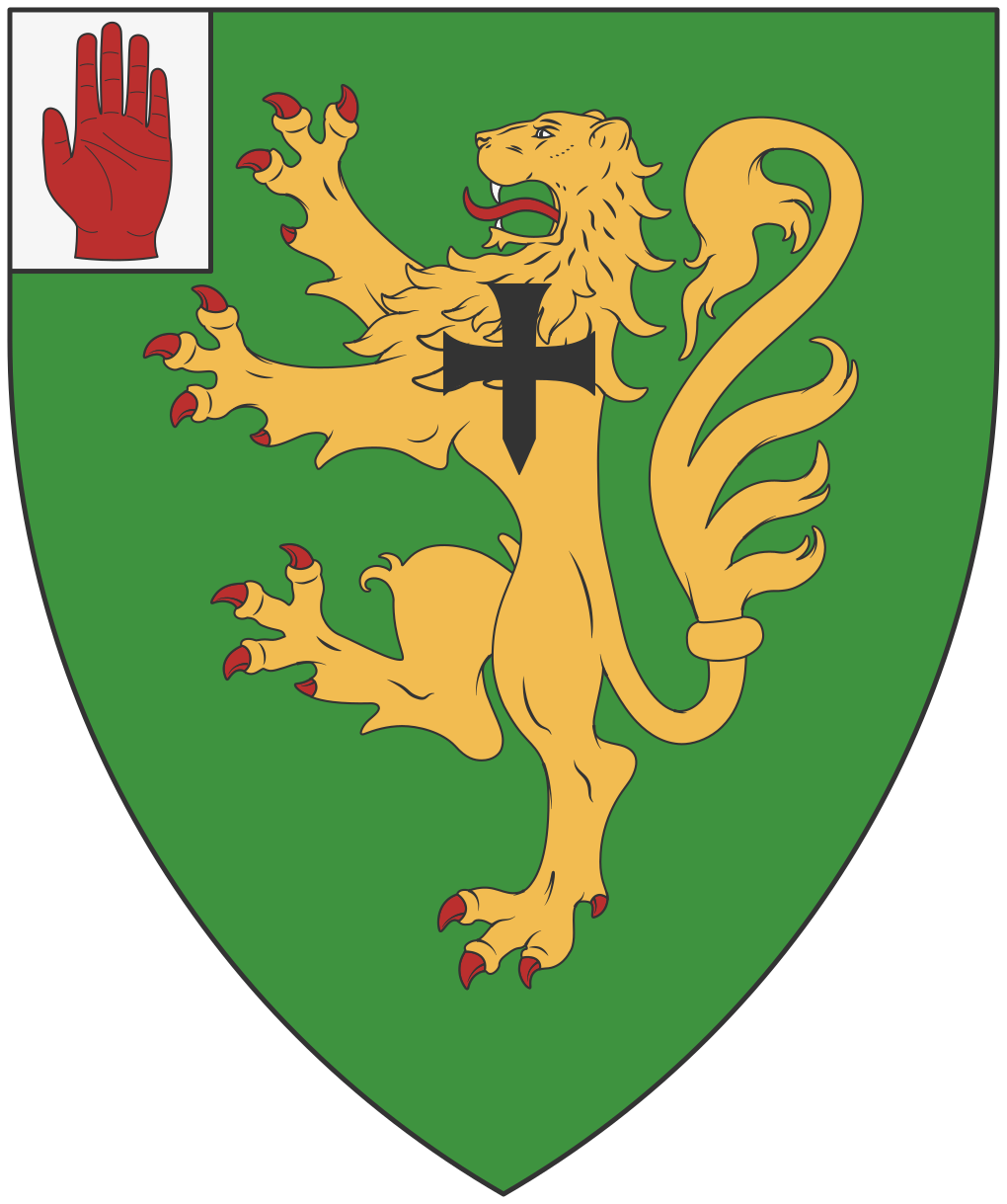
- Escutcheon of the Newton baronets of London
- Creation date: 1661
- Status: extinct
- Extinction date: 1670
- Arms: Vert, a lion rampant or, on the shoulder a cross pattée fitchée sable

The Newton baronetcy, of London, was created in the Baronetage of England on 25 January 1661 for Robert Newton. The title became extinct on his death in 1670.

He was a citizen of London and married Elizabeth (died 1661), daughter of Francis Longston (or Langstone) of London and Shropshire. He died without leaving a male heir in 1670.

== Newton baronets, of London (1661) ==
- Sir Robert Newton, 1st Baronet (died 1670).

== Extended family ==
Newton had a daughter Elizabeth (died 1693), who married Sir John Baker, 3rd Baronet, who died in 1661, and then in 1668 Sir Philip Howard. There was a son of the marriage, Philip Howard (1669–1711), but according to the History of Parliament "Howard's marriage to a wealthy widow proved unfortunate. She tricked him over her jointure, and they separated."
