= Ayloffe baronets =

Title in the Baronetage of England

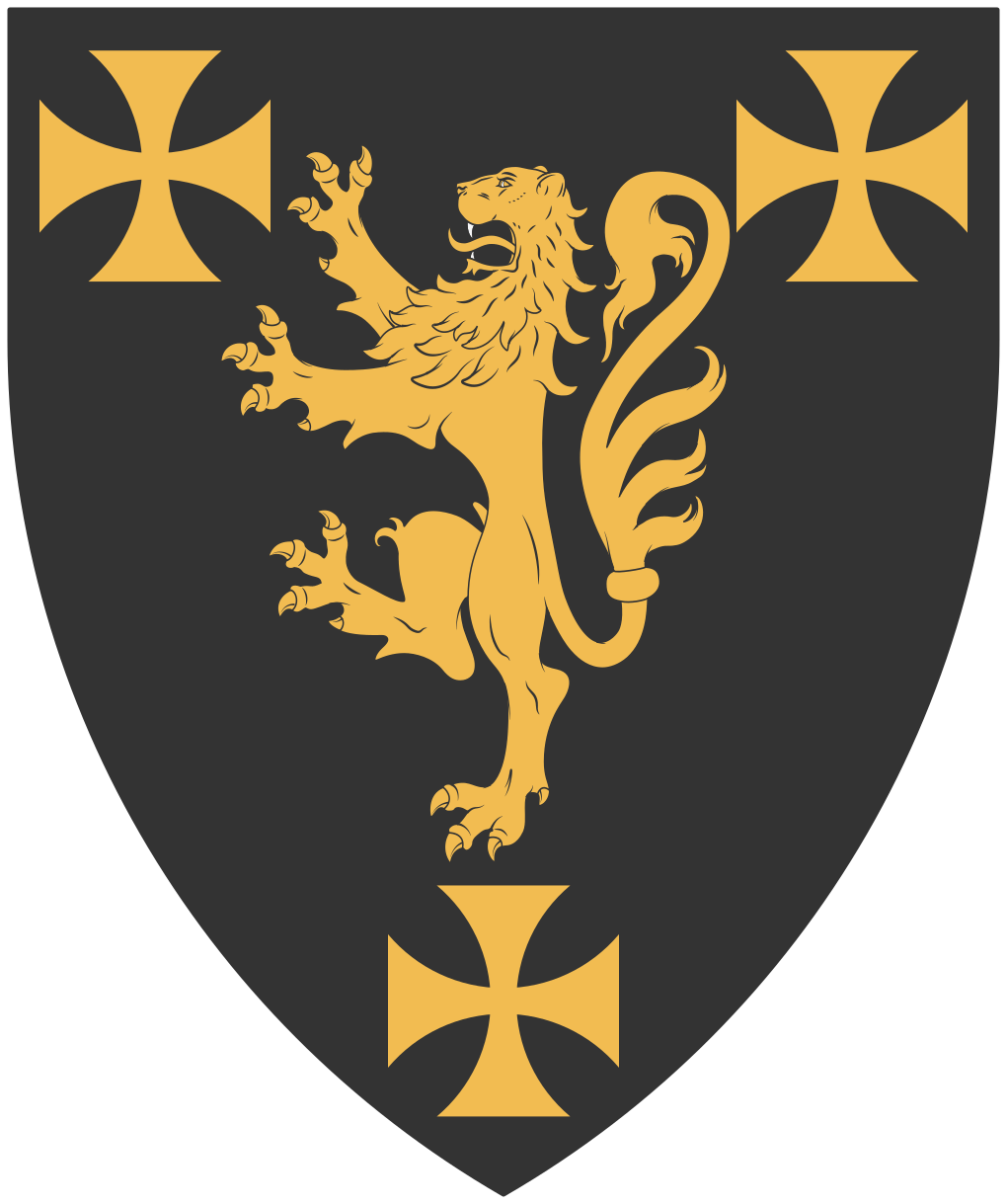
Arms of Ayloffe of Braxted Magna

The Ayloffe Baronetcy, of Braxted Magna in the County of Essex, was a title in the Baronetage of England. It was created on 25 November 1611 for Sir William Ayloffe, subsequently Member of Parliament for Stockbridge. The second Baronet was High Sheriff of Essex and supported the Royalist cause in the Civil War. The third Baronet was an officer in the Royalist army during the Civil War. The fourth Baronet was a London merchant. The fifth Baronet was Rector of Stanford Rivers in Essex from 1707 until 1730. The sixth Baronet was an antiquary. The title became extinct on his death 19 April 1781.

William Ayloffe, father of the first Baronet, was a distinguished judge.

== Ayloffe baronets, of Braxted Magna (1611) ==
- Sir William Ayloffe, 1st Baronet (1563–1627)
- Sir Benjamin Ayloffe, 2nd Baronet (1592–1662)
- Sir William Ayloffe, 3rd Baronet (1618–1675)
- Sir Benjamin Ayloffe, 4th Baronet (1631–1722)
- Sir John Ayloffe, 5th Baronet (c. 1673–1730)
- Sir Joseph Ayloffe, 6th Baronet (1708–1781)

== Notes ==
Baronetage of England
Preceded by Puckering baronets	Ayloffe baronets (of Braxted Magna); 25 November 1611	Succeeded by Wray baronets
