= Sir William Ayloffe, 3rd Baronet =

Sir William Ayloffe, 3rd Baronet (3 December 1618 – 1675) was an officer in the Royalist army during the English Civil War.

== Biography ==
William was the eldest son of Sir Benjamin Ayloffe and his second wife, Margaret, the fifth daughter of Thomas Fanshawe. He was born on 3 December 1618.

Like his father he supported the Royalist cause in the English Civil War. He was a colonel of a regiment at the siege of Colchester. On the death of his father in 1662 he inherited the family estates and baronetcy. He died in 1675, and was buried at Braxted. As he died without any surviving children, Benjamin, his younger brother, inherited the baronetcy.

== Family ==
Sir William married Anne (c. 1609–1684), 1st daughter of Peter Orby, of Burton Pedwardine, county Lincoln, and of Chertsey, Surrey, and Elizabeth, daughter of Robert Horseman, of Burton Pedwardine. Anne was the widow of Frederick de la Tremouille, Count de Laval and Benon in the kingdom of France, brother to the Duke of Tremoville. She died on 7 February 1684 and was buried at Braxted. Sir William and Anne had two sons, neither of whom outlived their father: Benjamin, who died an infant, and William (1646–1664), who died at the age of eighteen.

== Notes ==
Baronetage of England
Preceded by Benjamin Ayloffe	Baronet (of Baxted Manor); 1662–1675	Succeeded by Benjamin Ayloffe
