= William Ayloffe (judge) =

- Born: c.1535
- Died: 17 November 1584
- Spouse: Jane Sulyard
- Issue: William Ayloffe two other sons one daughter
- Father: William Ayloffe
- Mother: Anne Barnardiston

William Ayloffe (c.1535 – 17 November 1584), was an English justice of the Queen's Bench.

== Biography ==
William Ayloffe was descended from a very ancient family settled originally in Kent and subsequently in Essex, whose origin has been traced to Saxon times. (Note: Ayloffe's grandfather, William Ayloffe (d. 1517), a member of Lincoln's Inn who was granted a coat of arms in 1512, married Audrey Shaa, widow of John Writtle, and daughter Sir John Shaa, a London goldsmith and alderman.) Ayloffe's father, William Ayloffe of Hornchurch, Essex, married Anne Barnardiston, the daughter of Sir Thomas Barnardiston of Ketton, Suffolk.

On 14 February 1553-4 Ayloffe was admitted a student of Lincoln's Inn, where two other near relatives, bearing the same name, distinguished themselves in the sixteenth century, and in 1560 he was called to the bar. After being appointed "reader" at his inn of court in Lent term, 1571, he was made serjeant-at-law in 1577, at the same time as Sir Edmund Anderson, afterwards the well-known lord chief justice of the Common Pleas. A notice of a banquet in the Middle Temple hall, given by Ayloffe with other barristers upon whom a similar distinction had just been conferred, to celebrate their promotion, is preserved among the Ashmolean manuscripts at Oxford.

No record is known of Ayloffe's elevation to the bench, but he is found acting as judge in the court of Queen's Bench in 1579, and his judgments are reported by Dyer, Coke, and Savile after that date, which may therefore be regarded as the probable year of his appointment. He was present in 1581 at the trial of Edmund Campion and other seminary priests, and special attention is called to the part he played on that occasion in a pamphlet published by English Catholics at Pans shortly afterwards, and bearing the title An Epistle of Comfort to the Reverend Priestes and to the Honorable, Worshipful and other of the Laye sort restrayned in Durance for the Catholike Fayth, 12mo. On page 202 it is there stated, on the evidence of eyewitnesses, that while sitting in court after the other judges had retired, and while the jury were considering their verdict, Ayloffe took off his glove and found his hand and ring covered with blood without any apparent cause, and that, in spite of his endeavours to wipe it away, the blood continued to flow as a miraculous sign of the injustice that polluted the judgment-seat. Some letters that passed between Ayloffe and the lord mayor of London with reference to the appointment of his brother as town clerk, are preserved among the city archives for the years 1580 and 1581. Ayloffe died on 8 November 1585.

== Marriages and issue ==
Ayloffe married, about 1560, Jane Sulyard, the daughter of Sir Eustace Sulyard, by whom he had three sons and at least one daughter. In 1612 the baronetcy of Ayloffe was conferred by James I upon his eldest son, William (d.1627), who had been knighted in 1603. The baronetcy continued in the family till 1787. Sir William, the first baronet, married three times and a large family survived him.
