= Sir John Ayloffe, 5th Baronet =

Rev. Sir John Ayloffe, 5th Baronet (c. 1673 – 10 December 1730) was an English clergyman, Rector of Stanford Rivers in Essex from 1707 until 1730.

== Biography ==
John was the son of Henry Ayloffe of Pandets (captain of a troop of Horse), and Dorothy (daughter and heir of Richard Bulkeley, of Chedle, Cheshire). Henry was the third son of Sir Benjamin Ayloffe, 2nd Baronet and his second wife, Margaret, fifth daughter of Thomas Fanshawe of Jenkins in Barking. Henry's two elder brothers inherited the baronetcy but both died childless so on the death of Sir Benjamin, his uncle John Ayloffe inhered the title.

John was educated at Peterhouse, Cambridge; B.A., 1691; M.A., 1695, and, taking Holy Orders, was Rector of Stanford Rivers in Essex from 1707 until 1730. He succeeded to the Baronetcy on 5 March 1722. He died unmarried 10 December 1730, and was buried at Braxted. He was succeeded by his cousin, Sir Joseph Ayloffe (1708–1781), an English antiquary and the sixth and last Ayloffe baronet.

== Notes ==
Baronetage of England
Preceded by Benjamin Ayloffe	Baronet (of Braxted Manor); 1722–1730	Succeeded by Joseph Ayloffe
