= John Woodford (MP) =

English Member of Parliament

John Woodford (1586–1625) was an English diplomat and Member of Parliament (MP).

== Family ==
Woodford was born in April 1586, the son of Robert Woodford (d. 1599) of Britwell Place, Burnham, Buckinghamshire and his wife Ursula, daughter of Roger Colte of Woodwickes, Rickmansworth, Hertfordshire. Following his father's death, he matriculated at Balliol College, Oxford in 1600, taking his BA at Christ Church, Oxford in 1604. His mother married Hugh Holland with whom she had further children, while Britwell was sold under the terms of his father's will.

== Career ==
In 1610 Woodford he went to France as second secretary to Sir Thomas Edmondes, the newly appointed ambassador. His role included keeping a register of all the embassy's correspondence. By 1619 he had become secretary to secretary to James Hay, 1st Earl of Carlisle accompanying him on his embassies to France in 1621 and 1624.

He was a Member of the Parliament of England for Bury St. Edmunds in 1621 and for Tamworth in 1624.

He died in Paris in September 1625.
