= John Ayliffe =

English jurist (1676–1732)

John Ayliffe, LL.D. (1676–1732) was an English jurist, expelled from the University of Oxford in a high-profile controversy.

== Early life ==
Ayliffe was born at Pember, Hampshire, in 1676. He was educated at Winchester College and New College, Oxford, where he matriculated February 1690, became B.A. 1699, M.A. 1703, LL.B. and LL.D. 1710. Up to 1710 he practised as a proctor in the chancellor's court. But his Whig political opinions stood in the way of advancement.

== Political troubles ==
He was an ardent whig at a time when Oxford was the home of Tories and Jacobitism. In 1712, he issued a specimen of a work on Oxford for which he had collected materials while practising in the chancellor's court; but the scheme was received badly. The book was published, however, in 1714, about a week before Queen Anne's death. A few months later Ayliffe was summoned before the university court at the suits of Bernard Gardiner, then vice-chancellor, and of Thomas Braithwaite, the former vice-chancellor, for certain words reflecting on them. In the passage which gave offence he had gone out of his way to say that the funds of the Clarendon Printing House had been misappropriated. The result was that Ayliffe was expelled from the university, and deprived of all privileges and degrees. He was attacked also by John Cobb, the Warden of New College for another passage, where he remarked on the lack of distinction of the college's men. He was accused, moreover, of disobedience, and of having in a conversation with one Prince threatened to pistol the Warden. Rather than make submission he resigned his fellowship.

The whole story is told in a pamphlet, called the Case of Dr. Ayliffe at Oxford; from internal evidence it is thought Ayliffe either wrote or inspired it. It claims that the real causes of the proceedings were his insinuation that the unwillingness of several colleges to give him an account of their benefactors' funds, his protest against the veto claimed by some heads of colleges, and his political opinions. Nicholas Amhurst described a public speech delivered just after George I's accession, in which Ayliffe was violently abused.

== Death ==
He died on 5 November 1732.

== Works ==
Most of Ayliffe's Ancient and Present State of Oxford, which occasioned the attacks on him, is avowedly an abridgment and correction of Anthony Wood's History and Antiquities of Oxford. The work enters into legal details at length. Ayliffe's chief titles to fame are his two treatises on the canon law and the civil law. The Parergon Juris Canonici Anglicani appeared in 1726. In 1734 was published the first volume of a New Pandect of the Civil Law, which he had written some years before; there was at the time more interest in the civil law, and Ayliffe designed his book not only for the lawyer, but also for the politician and the diplomat.

1. 'The Ancient and Present State of the University of Oxford,' 2 vols, 1714, reprinted in 1723. The appendix contains a number of charters, decrees, &:c., relating both to Oxford and Cambridge.
2. 'The Case of Dr. Ayliffe at Oxford: giving, first, an Account of the Unjust and Malicious Prosecution of him in the Chancellor's Court of that University, for Writing and Publishing a Book, entituled the Antient and Present State of the University of Oxford: And secondly, an Account of the Proceedings had against him in his College, chiefly founded on the Prosecution of the University; whereby he was oblig'd to quit the one, and was expel'd the other,' 1716. (Attributed to Ayliffe.)
3. 'Parergon Juris Canonici Anglicani; or a Commentary by way of Supplement to the Canons and Constitutions of the Church of England,' &c., 1726; 2nd edition, 1734 The titles are alphabetically arranged. There is an historical introduction, and appended to the work is a catalogue of the monastic and religious houses dissolved by Henry VIII, with their yearly value.
4. 'The Law of Pledges, or Pawns, as it was in use among the Romans, and as it is now practiced in most foreign Nations,' 1732. This was a publication by anticipation of Book IV. Tit. 18 of the work on the civil law, and was addressed to the House of Commons, then making inquiries into what Ayliffe called 'the dark recesses and malepractices of pawnbrokers and their accomplices in iniquity.'
5. 'A New Pandect of Roman Civil Law, as anciently established in that Empire, and now received and practiced in most European Nations,' &c., vol. i., 1734. The second volume never appeared. Ayliffe's treatise has been described as dull, tedious, and confused (Arthur Browne in his Compendious View of the Civil Law, p. ii).
