= Banqueting House (disambiguation) =

The Banqueting House is a 17th-century building on Whitehall, London.

Banqueting House may also refer to:

- Banqueting House, Gibside, a part of the former Gibside estate near Newcastle upon Tyne
- Jesmond Dene Banqueting Hall, another example in Newcastle upon Tyne

== See also ==
- Banqueting house, a type of building in English architecture
- Mansion House, London, the official residence of the Lord Mayor of London, which hosts official annual banquets
