= Woodford County High School =

Woodford County High School may refer to:

- Woodford County High School (Kentucky), United States, a coeducational public school in Versailles, Kentucky, serving all of Woodford County
- Woodford County High School For Girls, a girls' school in the London Borough of Redbridge, United Kingdom
