= Gibside =

Country estate in Tyne and Wear, England

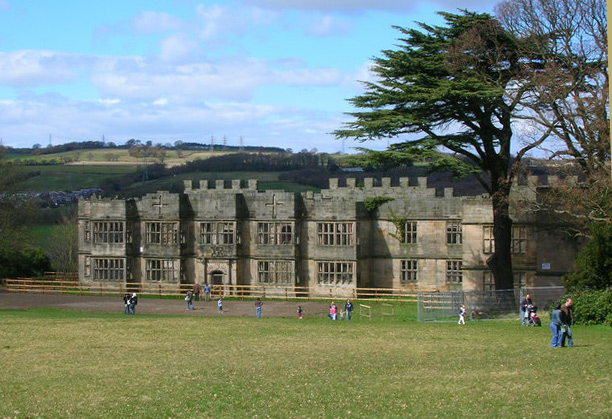
- The shell of Gibside Hall

- Location within Tyne and Wear
- 54.9245°N 1.7267°W
- Location: Rowlands Gill, Gateshead, England
- Nearest city: Gateshead

History
- Built: 1603–20 (hall) c. 1729–1812 (park)
- Built for: Sir William Blakiston (hall); Sir George Bowes (park)

Site notes
- Area: 600 acres (240 hectares)
- Restored: 1965 onward
- Owner: National Trust, Landmark Trust
- Website: Official website

Listed Building – Grade II*
- Official name: Gibside
- Designated: 1 February 1950
- Reference no.: 1299730

National Register of Historic Parks and Gardens
- Official name: Gibside
- Designated: 1 January 1985
- Reference no.: 1000508

Gibside is an estate in Tyne and Wear, England. It is located in the valley of the River Derwent on the border with County Durham, between Rowlands Gill and Burnopfield. The estate is the surviving part of a Georgian landscaped park, primarily created under the ownership of Sir George Bowes (1701–60) and designed in large part by Stephen Switzer and William Joyce.

The park contains structures designed by James Paine, including a Palladian chapel; Daniel Garrett, including a banqueting house; and William Newton, but several are now ruined shells or have been demolished. Gibside Hall, the house at the centre of the estate, dates in part from the 17th century, is Grade II* listed, but is also a shell.

Gibside descended by marriage from the mid-13th century, and passed to the Bowes family in 1693. It was sold piecemeal during the 20th century; the banqueting house is now owned by the Landmark Trust, and much of the rest of the estate by the National Trust.

== History ==
The Blakiston family acquired the estate by marriage in about 1540. Sir William Blakiston (1562–1641) replaced the old house with a spacious mansion between 1603 and 1620. Both the Royal (James I of England) coat of arms and the Blakiston coat of arms are seen over the entrance of the old Hall. The Gibside property came into the possession of the Bowes family in 1713; a result of the marriage in 1693 of Sir William's great-granddaughter, Elizabeth Blakiston, to Sir William Bowes (1657–1707) of Streatlam Castle, County Durham (now demolished).

Until 1722, the basis of the Bowes' influence was their own estate and house of Streatlam Castle. However, after that date the acquisition through marriage of the Blakiston estate of Gibside gave the Bowes family an even greater influence in the north of the county and a share in the immense wealth that was to be acquired from the coal trade. The Blakiston estate included some of the area's richest coal seams.

In 1767 the granddaughter of Sir William Bowes – the "Bowes heiress" Mary Eleanor Bowes – married John Lyon, 9th Earl of Strathmore and Kinghorne, who changed his surname to Bowes due to a provision in her father's will that any suitor had to take the family name. This was a device to continue the Bowes lineage in the absence of a male heir.

After the split inheritance dispute following the death of John Bowes, 10th Earl of Strathmore and Kinghorne, in 1820, it belonged to his legitimated son John Bowes until his death in 1885 (he is buried in the Gibside chapel), when under the entail it reverted to his cousin Claude Bowes-Lyon, 13th Earl of Strathmore and Kinghorne. It had been the main residence of John Bowes' mother, Mary Milner, by then Dowager Countess of Strathmore, and her second husband, the politician Sir William Hutt (who had been John Bowes' tutor), and remained in his ownership until his death in 1882.

== Park structures ==
Improvements to Gibside carried out by the Bowes-Lyon family in the 18th and early 19th centuries included landscaping, Gibside Chapel, built between 1760 and 1812, the Banqueting House, a column of Liberty, a substantial stable block, an avenue of oaks and several hundred acres of forest. The top floor of the main house was remodelled as a giant parapet in 1805.

=== Chapel ===
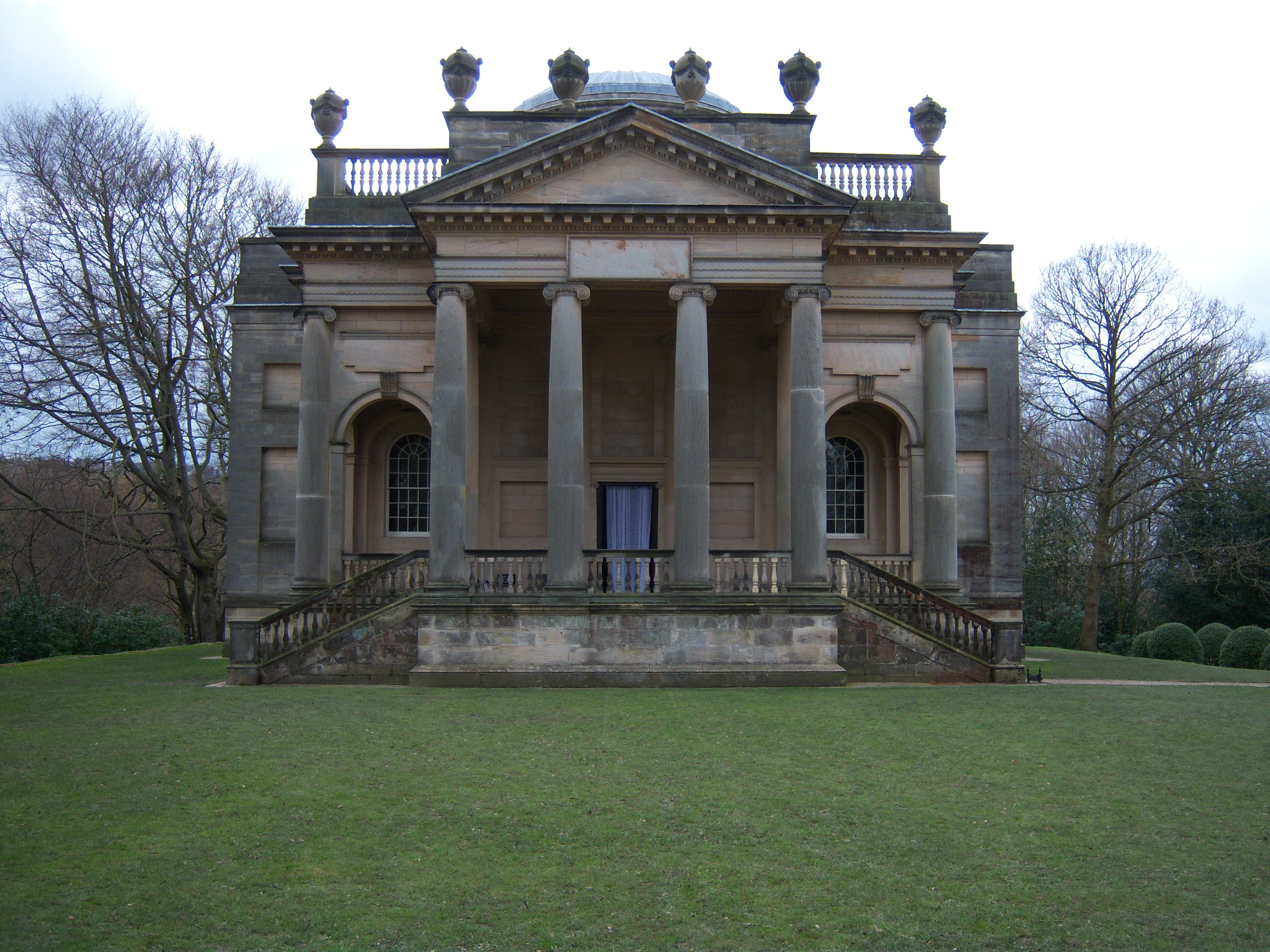
The north-east façade of the chapel

The chapel is located at the south-western end of the Avenue and was begun in July 1760 to a design derived from Palladio by James Paine; an unrealised circular design was commissioned in 1737 from either Sir Thomas Robinson, 1st Baronet or Daniel Garrett. Sir George Bowes died in September 1760, and the shell of the building was completed in 1769 under the supervision of his widow, Mary Gilbert. His grandson John Bowes, 10th Earl of Strathmore and Kinghorne, completed the interior work and had the chapel consecrated in 1812. Sir George was then buried in the mausoleum beneath the building.

The building was designed in the Palladian style and takes the form of a Greek cross within a square, with a dome on a drum over the crossing. The north-east facade, which faces the Avenue, is the most highly-decorated part of the building. It consists of a double portico, the inner order consisting of six unfluted Ionic columns and the outer of four, carrying the pediment. The two outer columns on each side of the inner portico are engaged, the gaps between them being filled by arched openings. The whole facade is topped by six urns. The other three facades are plainer, and feature Diocletian windows in the end elevations of the cross arms.

Internally, the arms of the cross are apsed and groin vaulted and the crossing and corners are domed. The entablature and arches are richly decorated, as intended by Paine, but the rest of his decorative scheme, which would have included coffering in the apses and dome and statues in the niches of the apses, was not carried out. Nevertheless, the nineteenth-century cherrywood furnishings are of high quality and complete. They consist of a holy table surrounded by rails; a triple-decker pulpit, the sounding board supported by a single Ionic column; and box pews in the corners and side apses, the latter curved to fit the space. The Bowes-Lyons used a box pew in a corner which had underfloor heating.

There is a house for the minister nearby. Some holders of the position would not have been able to hold a Church of England parish living, on account of their views.

=== Orangery ===
The orangery was built between 1772 and 1774 for Mary Eleanor Bowes, who had a keen interest in botany, to a design by William Newton. The building has a seven-bay arcade of Tuscan columns to the front and plain three-bay arcades to each side, the rear arch on each side filled with a pedimented doorway, which lead into lobbies. The rear contains five sash windows, the middle three forming a canted bay with views across the Derwent valley. The building, which originally had a slate roof, was converted into a conservatory by John Bowes in 1885 by the addition of a glazed iron roof; at the same time a brick podium was constructed in the centre of the main room to display plants and a heating system added, with a boiler installed in the western lobby. The roof was removed between the First and Second World Wars, since when the orangery has been a roofless shell, however the fabric was consolidated by the National Trust in 2005.

=== Stables ===
The stables were built between 1746 and 1751. The design was probably by Daniel Garrett, and is similar to his Fenham Hall in Newcastle-upon-Tyne. The building forms a quadrangle around a courtyard, with the main entrance in the south wing and an exit in the west wing, thus enabling carriages to pass through without needing to turn. The east wing, which contained the visitor entrance and which faced the new coach drive created for Sir George, is decorated in the Palladian style. The centre projects in a five-bay block, with a pediment over the central three bays. The door occupies the centre bay of the ground floor, and is flanked by niches and set within a three-bay blind arcade, and there are two aedicules in the outer bays. The first floor has five sash windows. Inside, some plasterwork and the stalls of the show stable survive, the latter separated by narrow wooden classical columns.

=== Banqueting House ===
The Banqueting House was built in 1746, and is an early example of Gothic Revival architecture, of the early form often called "Gothick". It has now been restored and is available for letting by the Landmark Trust, who now own it.

=== Column to Liberty ===
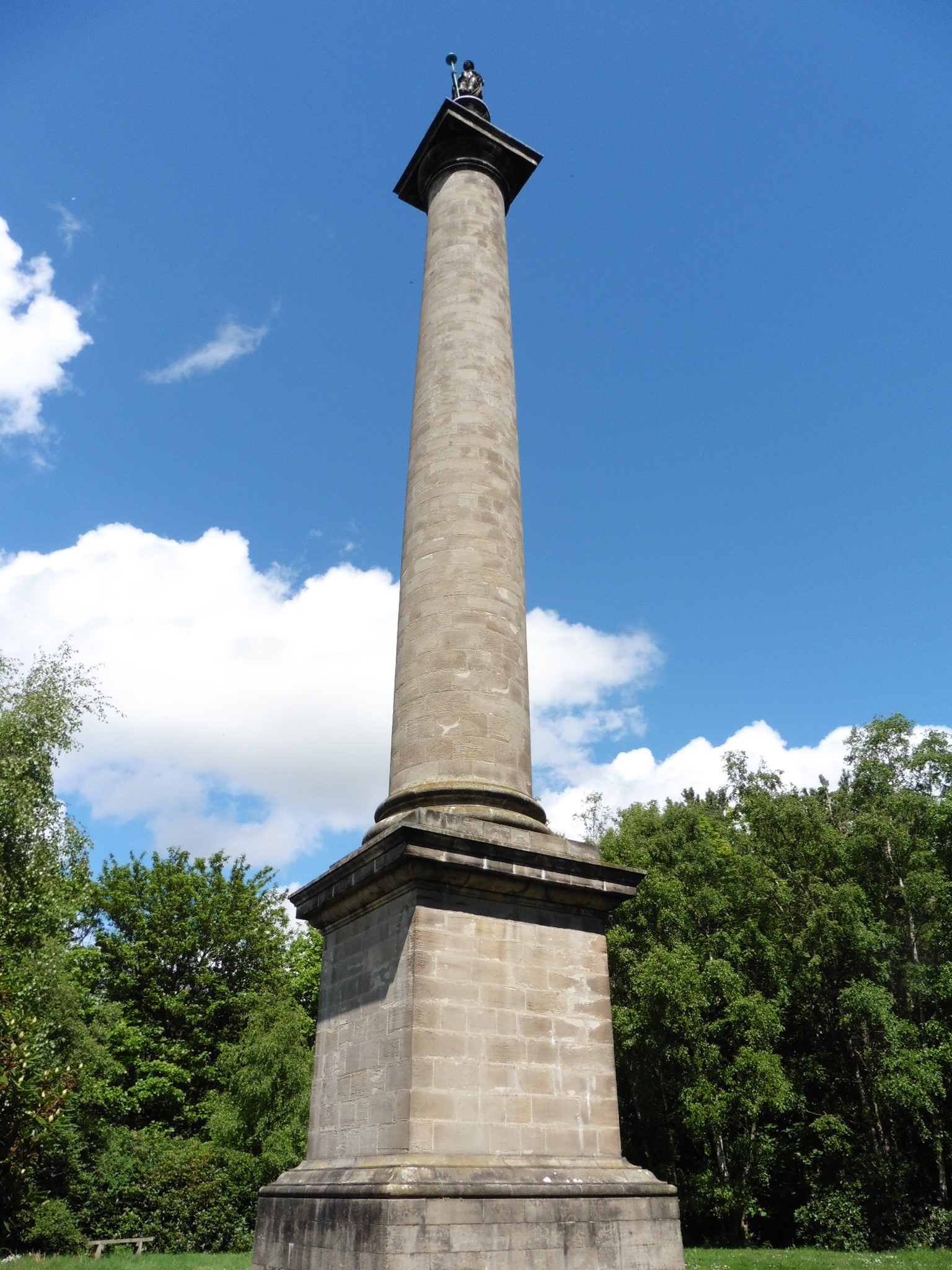
The Column to Liberty

The Column to Liberty was built between 1750 and 1759 to a design by Garrett, but completed by Paine after the former's death in 1753. It consists of a pedestal bearing a Roman Doric column, which at 42.7 m (140 ft) was, when constructed, the second-tallest column monument in England after the Monument to the Great Fire of London. The column is topped by a statue of a woman, personifying Liberty and originally gilded, who holds the Staff of Maintenance and Cap of Liberty. It represents George Bowes' support for the Whig Party.

== Later history ==
The Bowes-Lyon family had other major country houses, Glamis Castle in Scotland, and Streatlam Castle, County Durham, located 30 miles (48 km) to the south.

Streatlam Castle became vacant in the 1920s after the Bowes-Lyon family sold some of its properties to pay death duties. The building was stripped of its fixtures and fittings, with many of the fireplaces and other items being transferred to Glamis Castle. Parts of the structure were demolished in 1958, including the removal of the roof. What remains is protected by Grade II* listed building status and included in the Heritage at Risk Register.

Parts of the grounds have been designated a Site of Special Scientific Interest, including a forest garden.

The chapel and Long Walk have been in the National Trust's ownership since 1965, and an additional 354 acres (1.43 km^{2}) of the grounds were acquired in 1993. The Banqueting House has been in the ownership of the Landmark Trust since 1981, the building having been restored from a derelict shell. The stables now house a learning and discovery centre.

Women's Land Army girls were billeted at Gibside during World War I.

== Gallery ==
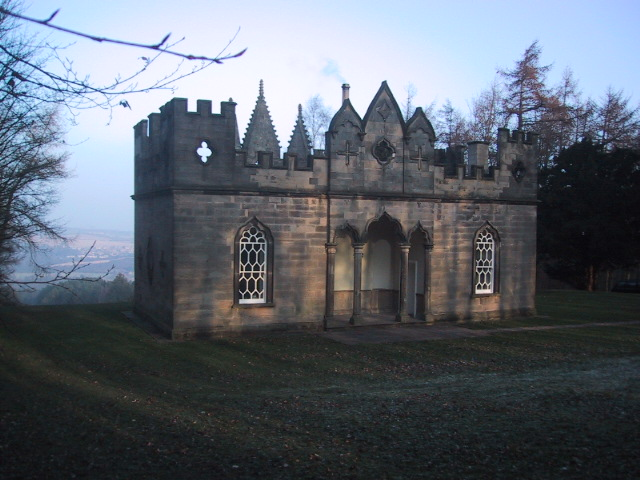
The Banqueting House

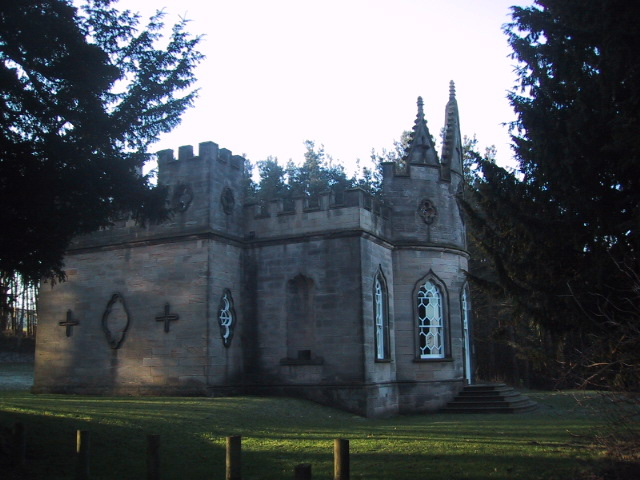
Another view

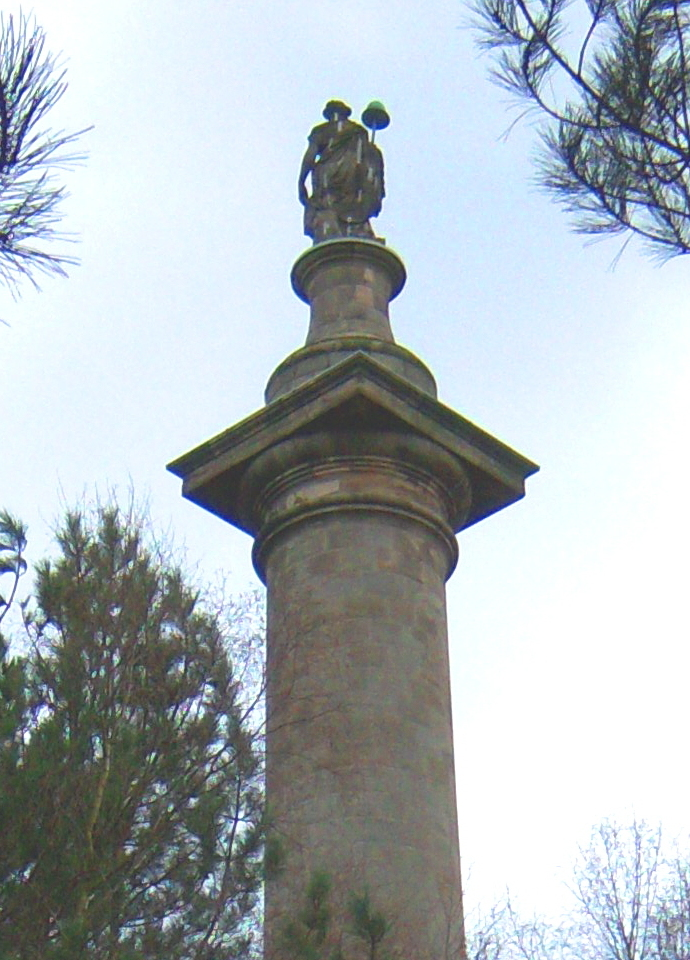
The top of the Column to Liberty, the figure seen from behind

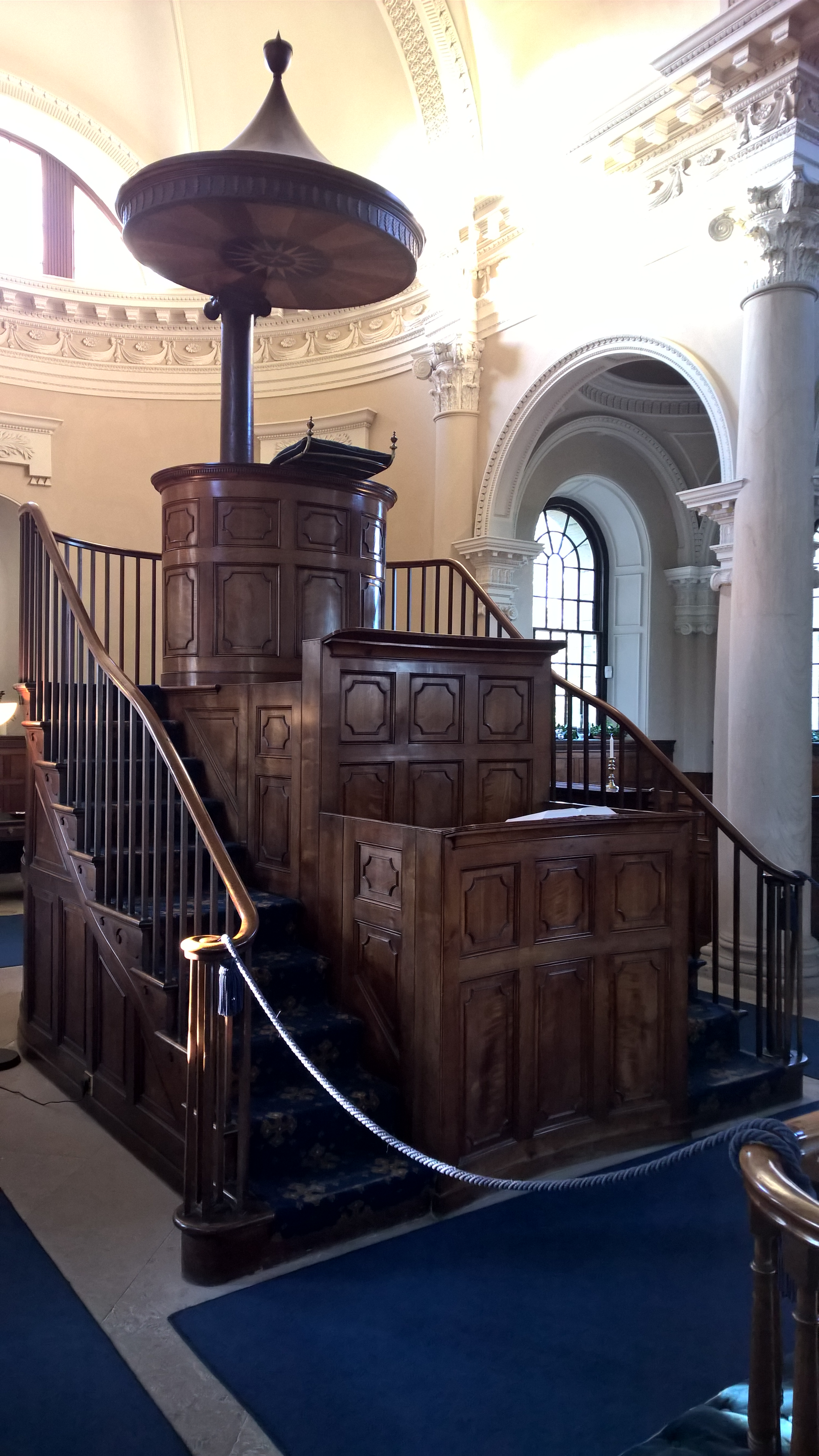
Centrally-placed three-decker pulpit at Gibside Chapel, a private chapel on the Calvinist edge of Anglicanism

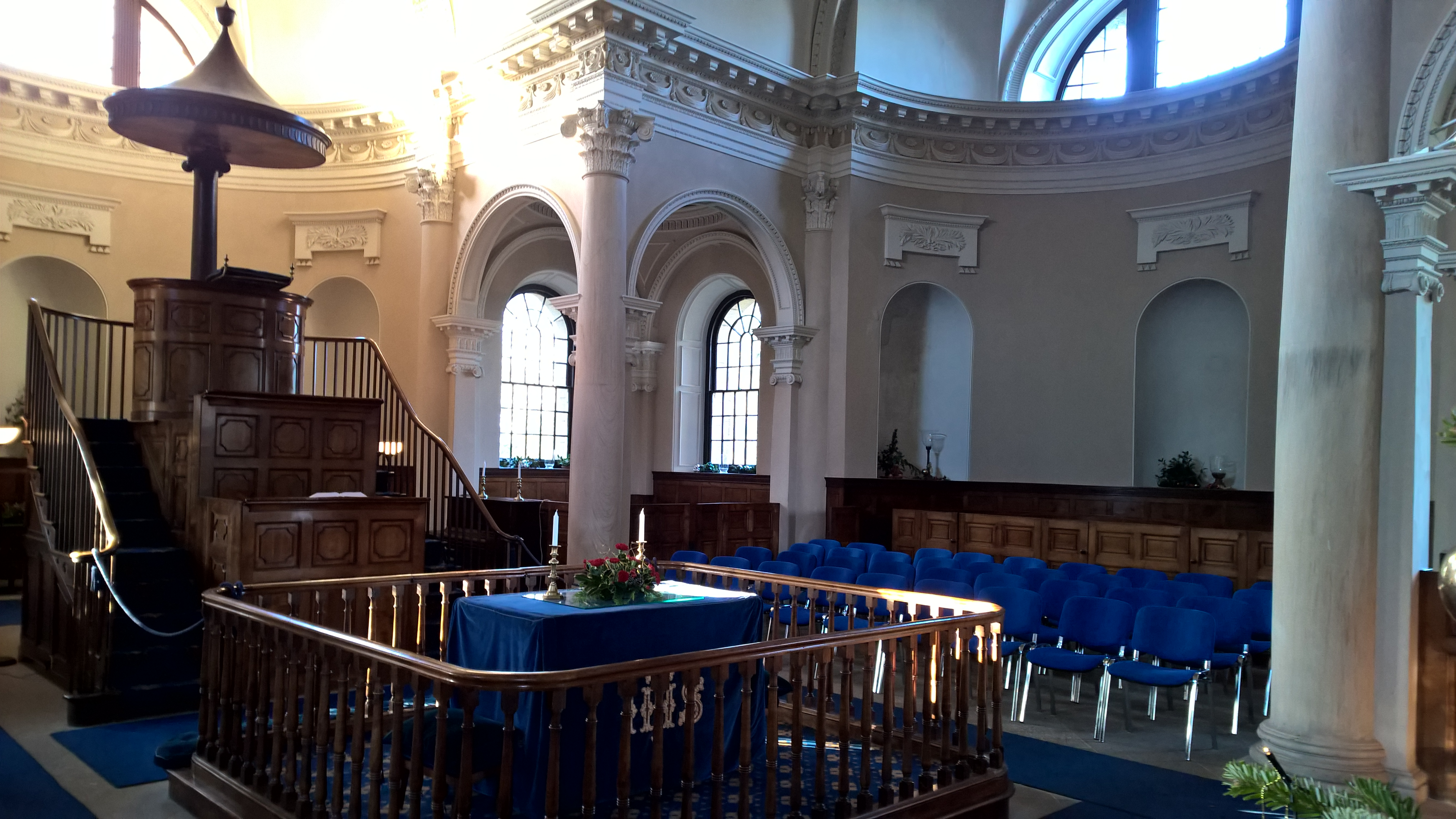
Interior of the chapel

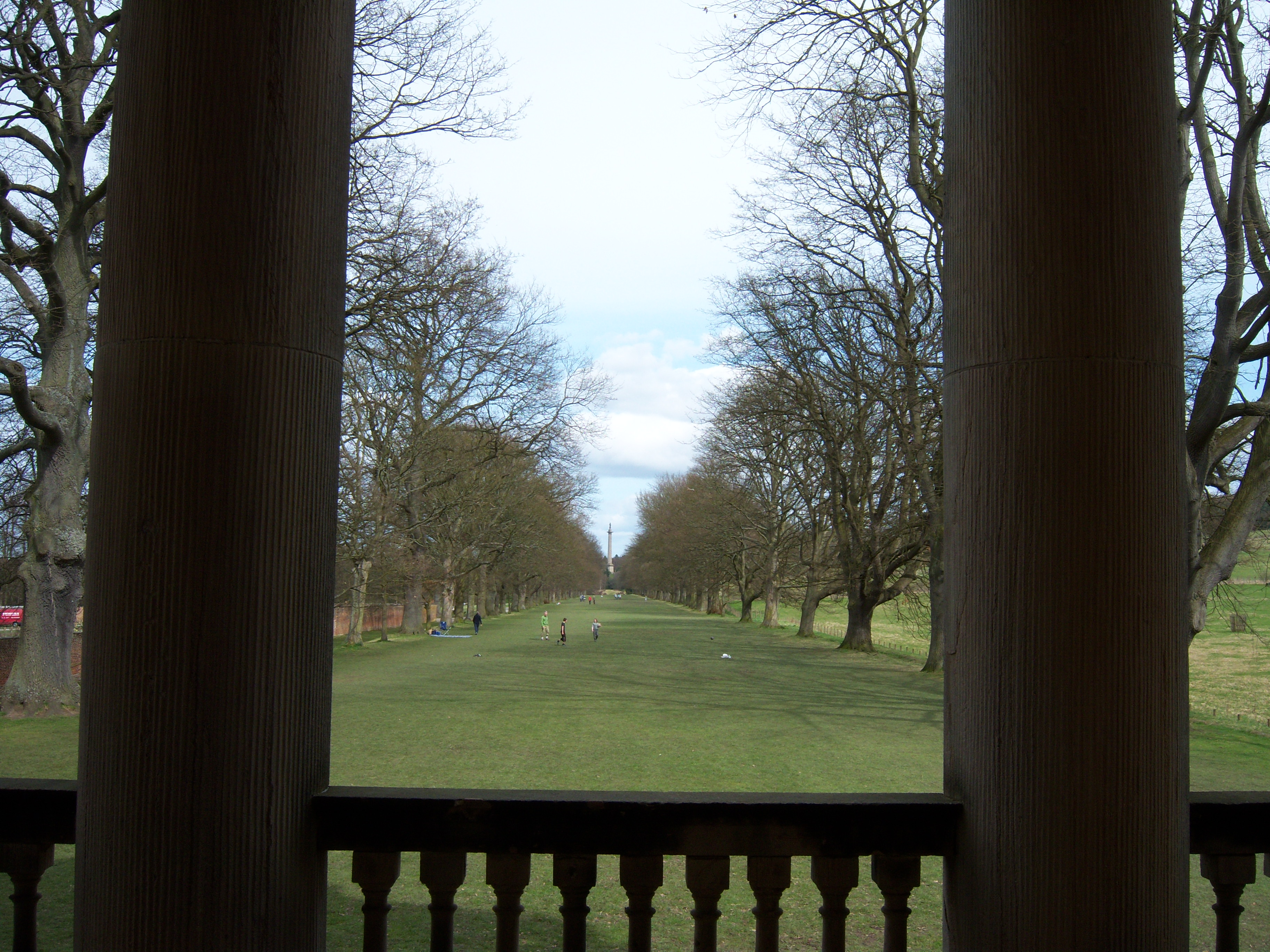
The Column to Liberty can be seen from the porch of Gibside Chapel

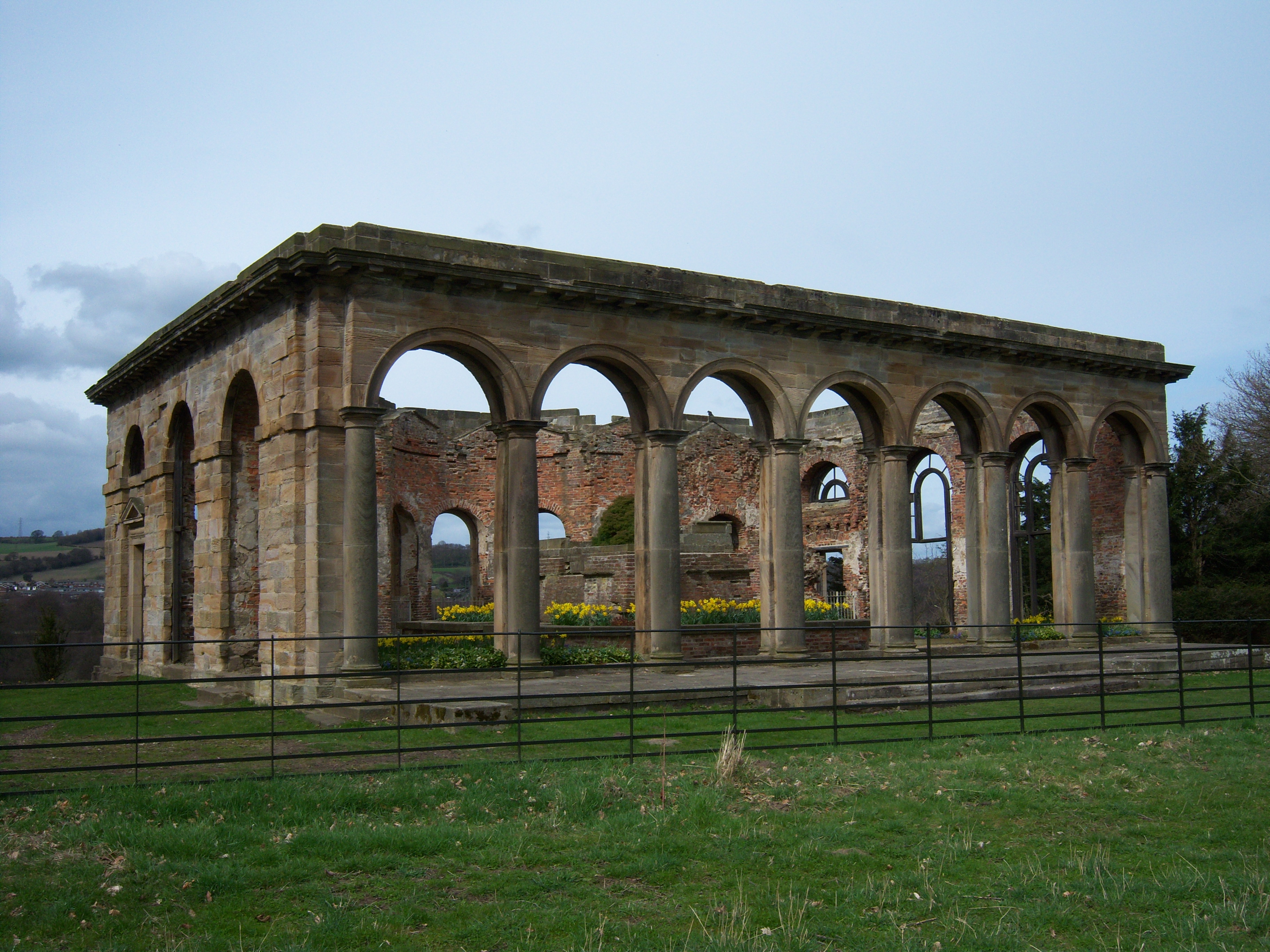
Shell of the orangery

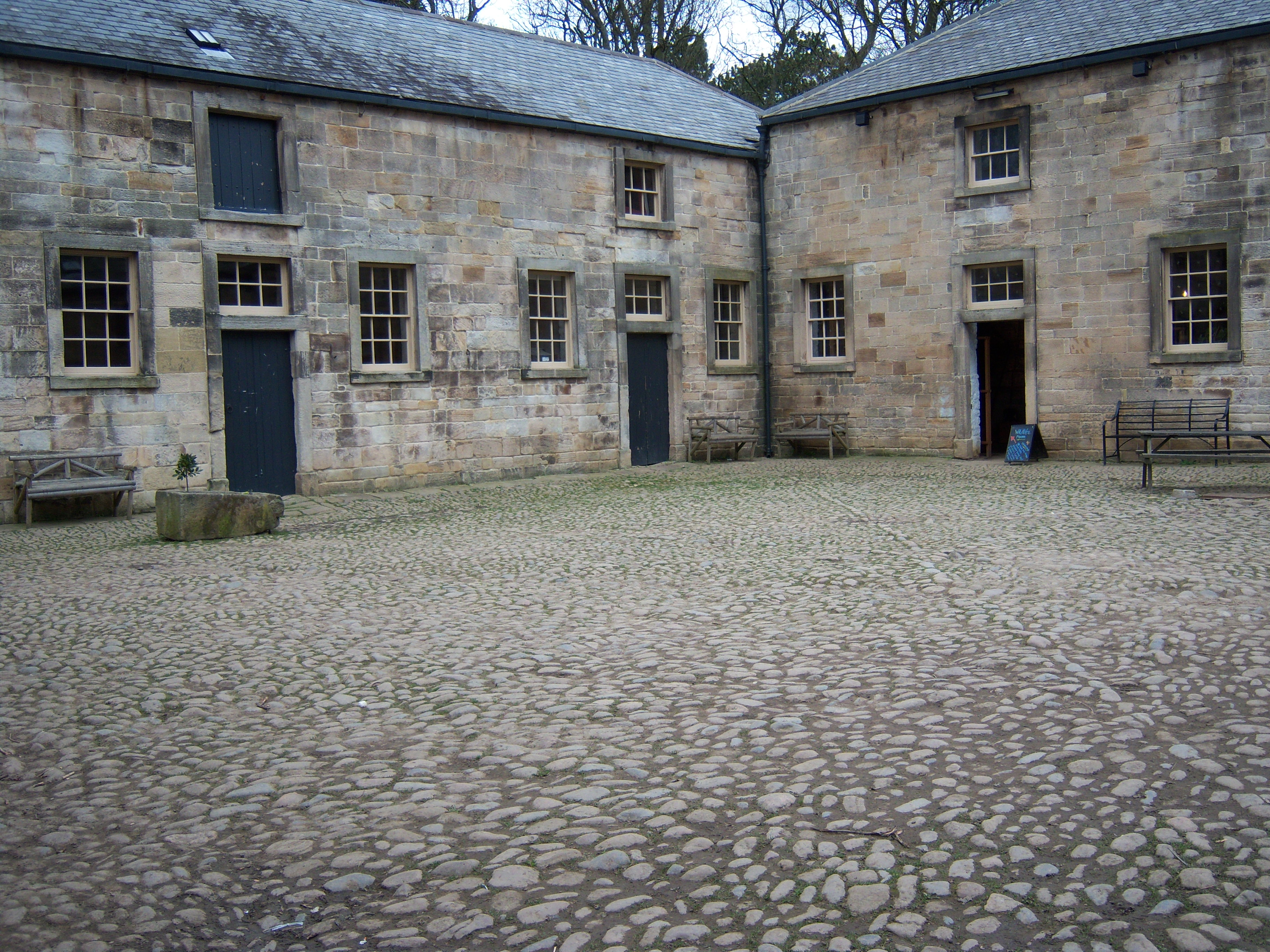
The stables

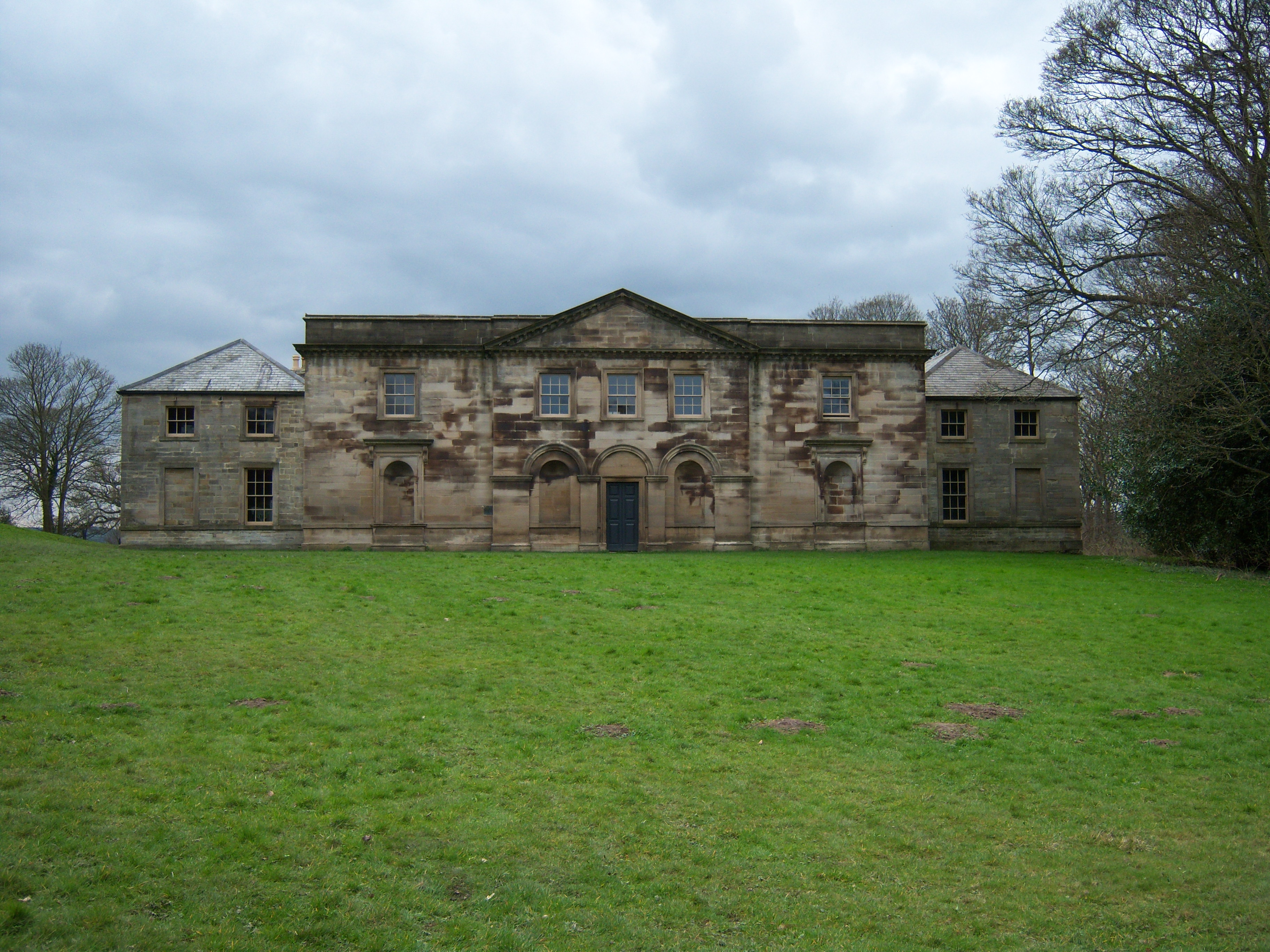
Side of the stable block

== See also ==
- Grade II* listed buildings in Tyne and Wear
- 18th-century Western domes
