= Woodford County High School For Girls =

Location
- High Road; Woodford Green, London, IG8 9LA; England
- Coordinates: 51.607°N 0.0185°E

Information
- Type: Grammar
- Motto: Laeti Gratias Deo Agimus (Let us thank God joyfully)
- Established: 1919
- Local authority: Redbridge
- Department for Education URN: 102852 Tables
- Ofsted: Reports
- Head teacher: Gemma Van Praagh
- Staff: Deputy Head - Mr Colin Jenkins
- Gender: Girls
- Age: 11 to 18
- Enrolment: 1098
- Houses: Highams green, Repton blue, Warner yellow and Newton red
- Colours: , ,
- Website: www.woodford.redbridge.sch.uk

Woodford County High School For Girls, formerly Woodford County High School (WCHS) is a secondary all-girls selective state grammar school in Woodford Green of the London Borough of Redbridge, England. The school was opened in 1919. Woodford County's brother school for boys is Ilford County High School.

Woodford County High School has seven Years (7–13) . To gain a place in the lower school, children take the 11-plus exam via the local authority, the London Borough of Redbridge. Redbridge offers the top 180 girls in the 11-plus exam results places. The school offers a range of GCSE subjects, including Classical Civilisation.

Although the school is part of the Borough of Redbridge school system, the school buildings themselves are located in the London Borough of Waltham Forest.

== History ==
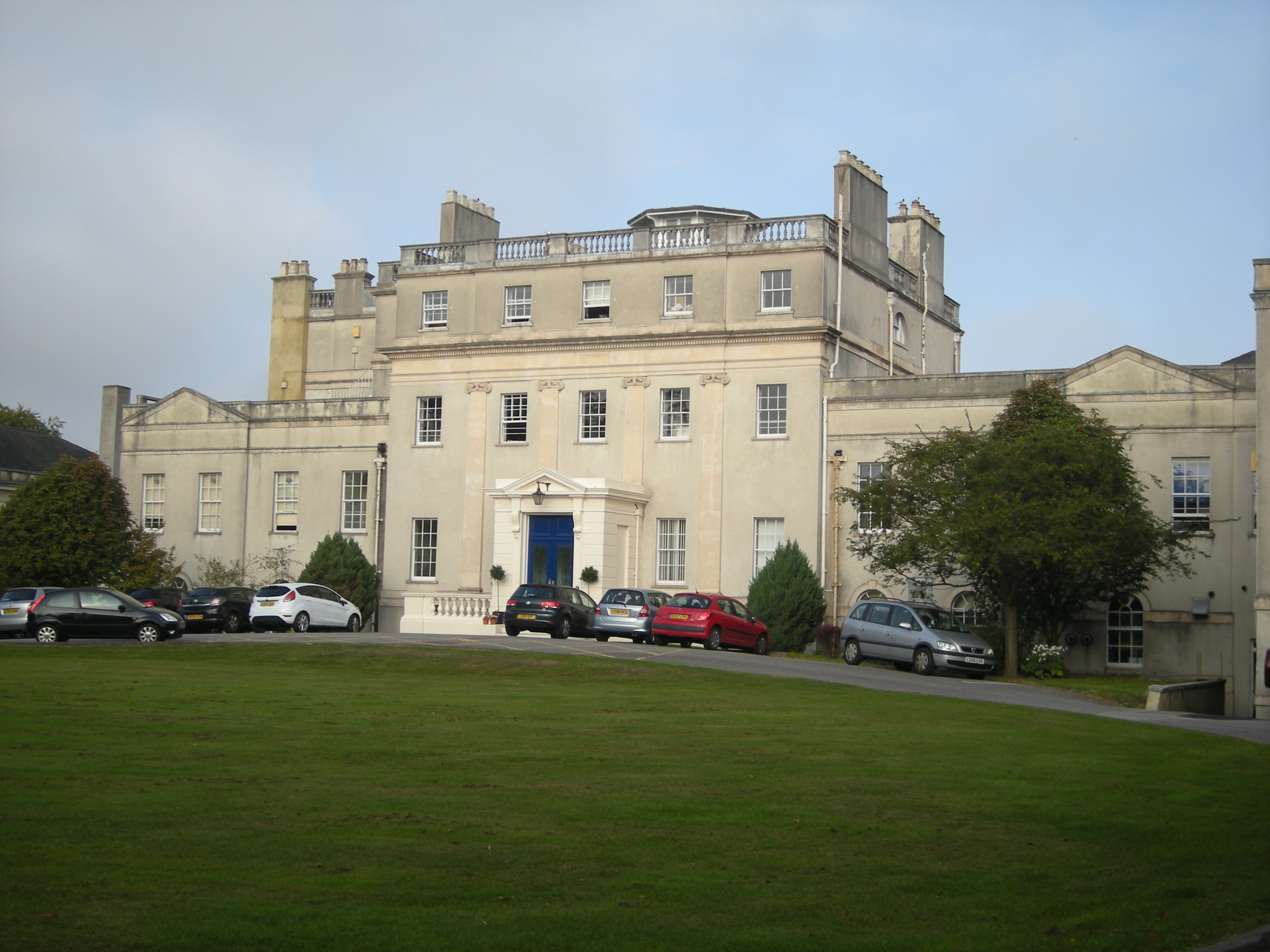
Woodford County High School for Girls; the 1768 building designed by William Newton.

The main school building was originally Highams Manor or Highams Park, and was built in 1768 by William Newton (1735–1790). The exterior has Ionic order pilasters and a polygonal roof lantern. Notable internal features include a stone staircase with a wrought-iron balustrade. The grounds were designed by Humphry Repton and originally included Highams Park Lake. In 1849, the house was acquired by the Warner family, who also held ownership of many properties in Walthamstow. The building was later used a hospital, in which Florence Nightingale worked, as well as a means of accommodation for Winston Churchill during the Second World War. The site became Woodford County High school for Girls in 1919 and was extended to the north and south between 1928 and 1938. It became a Grade II listed building in 1951.

== Notable former pupils ==
- Julie Marson, Conservative MP for Hertford and Stortford and former Employment Minister
- Jane Lomax-Smith, Lord Mayor of Adelaide
- Kathleen Lonsdale (1903–1971), crystallographer
- Jenny Powell, TV presenter
- Lucy Kirkwood, playwright
- Sarah Winman, actress and author
- Mona Chalabi, journalist
