= Château du Grand Jardin =

Grand pavilion in Haute-Marne, France

Coordinates: 48°26′47″N 5°8′26″E

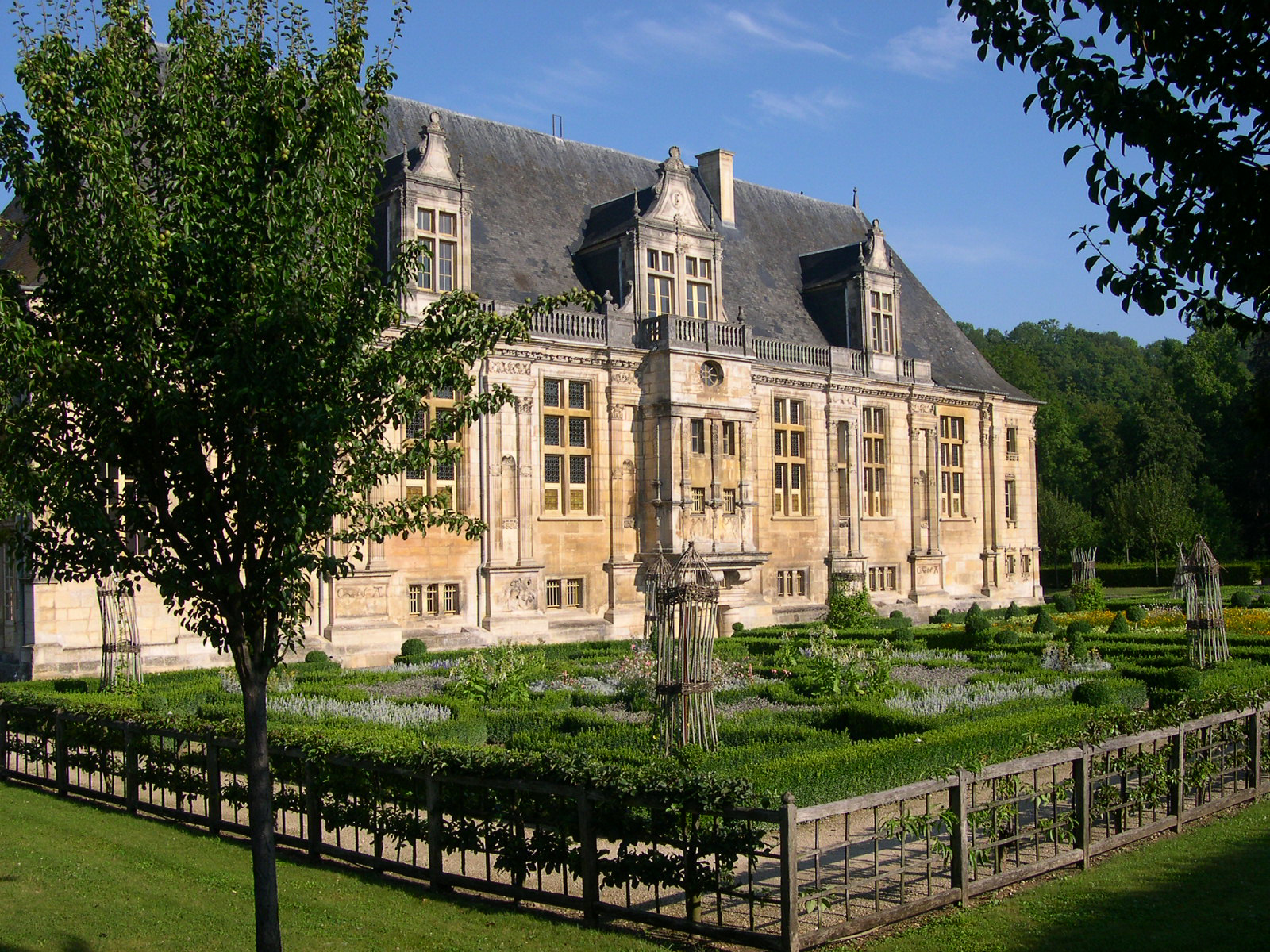
Château du Grand Jardin

The Château du Grand Jardin was a maison de plaisance attached to the seat at Joinville, Haute-Marne, France, of Claude de Lorraine, duc de Guise, who built it between 1533 and 1546 as a grand pavilion designed for fêtes and entertainments. The Château d'en-bas (the "Lower Château") as it was called at first, formed an annex to the medieval château fort overlooking Joinville, a stronghold of the House of Guise that was demolished at the French Revolution. In addition to its grand festive hall, which dominated the interior, were a suite of semi-private rooms to which the duke and duchess could withdraw with their most honored guests; they included a chamber preceded by its antechamber and a more private garde-robe within, but no bedrooms, as the seat of the Duke, the château de Joinville itself, was so near at hand. The Château du Grand Jardin functioned as a banqueting house on the grandest scale, a fit demonstration of the power and prestige of the head of the House of Guise.

The site, partly in ruins, was purchased at the beginning of the 1980s by the conseil général of Haute-Marne. The building was restored, and the grand park created in the 19th century has been restored and replanted (illustration).

The site has also reacquired its original vocation as a place of culture: concerts of classical music are presented at the Grand Jardin, expositions of contemporary art, and colloquiums. The château du Grand Jardin is currently a member of the European network of Centres culturels de rencontre.

== Architecture ==
The plan of the château, surrounded by its moat in the usual French manner, comprises a rectangular corps de logis without wings or outbuildings. Richly ornamented, it combines elements of Italian architectural style, under its prominent French slate roof with dormer windows.

The interior is dominated by a vast reception hall. Beneath are wine cellars and kitchens. About 1544 a reception room (chambre d'apparat) was added in the northeast corner, and in 1546 a chapel was built at the southern corner, with a coffered ceiling in the Italian taste. The two ends of the structure contain spiral staircases, with military motifs and the princely monogram enriching the mouldings.

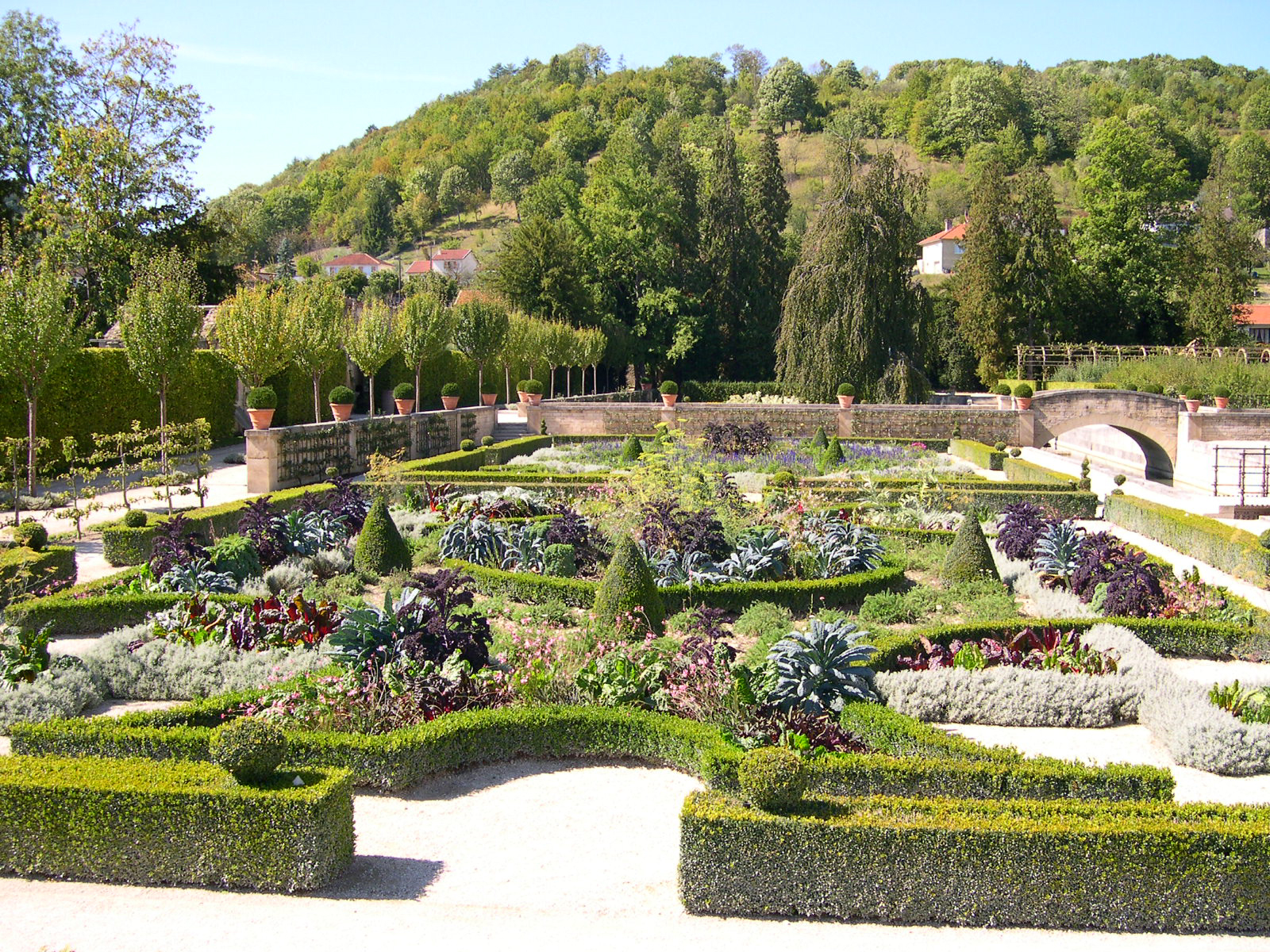
The restored parterre planted with exotic tropicals in silver and bronze, combines 16th-century and 19th-century garden styles

== Garden ==
The remarkable garden, now splendidly restored, once ranked with Villandry, (Indre-et-Loire) and Chamerolles (Loiret) among the great French gardens of the 16th century. Swept away in favor of a parc à l'anglaise in the 19th century, after the site had been purchased in 1856 by the foundry master Pierre Salin Capitaine, then left to run wild, the parterre was entirely remade in the 1990s to give the maison de plaisance a setting suited to its festive character. In a space of about four hectares, its shaped compartments are complemented by squares planted with flowers for the altar and aromatics and medicinal herbs. A collection of 365 fruit trees – in their natural state, or pruned as free-standing, or espaliered against walls, or free-standing palissades en treillage – enclose the parterre; they include traditional varieties of apples, pears, quinces, cherries, and plums.

The English park also remains, as a kind of arboretum of specimen trees that include Chinese Ginkgo biloba, American bald cypresses, Liquidambar and Liriodendron and the dawn redwood Metasequoia. Water is an important element: the spring feeds a canal that traverses the garden and fills the moats, then as a natural brook flows through the park to a small pond.

Though the garden was ravaged by the troops of Emperor Charles V in 1544, they were restored for the visit of François I in 1546; the garden in its heyday was described by the poet Rémy Belleau, a member of la Pléiade who was serving as tutor to Charles, son of the marquis d'Elboeuf, as "Le plus beau et le plus accompli qu'on pourrait souhaiter… soit pour le comptant d'arbres fruitiers… soit pour la beauté du parterre"— "the most beautiful and the most accomplished that one could wish, whether for the number of its fruit trees or for the beauty of the parterre."
