= Garden house at Charlton House =

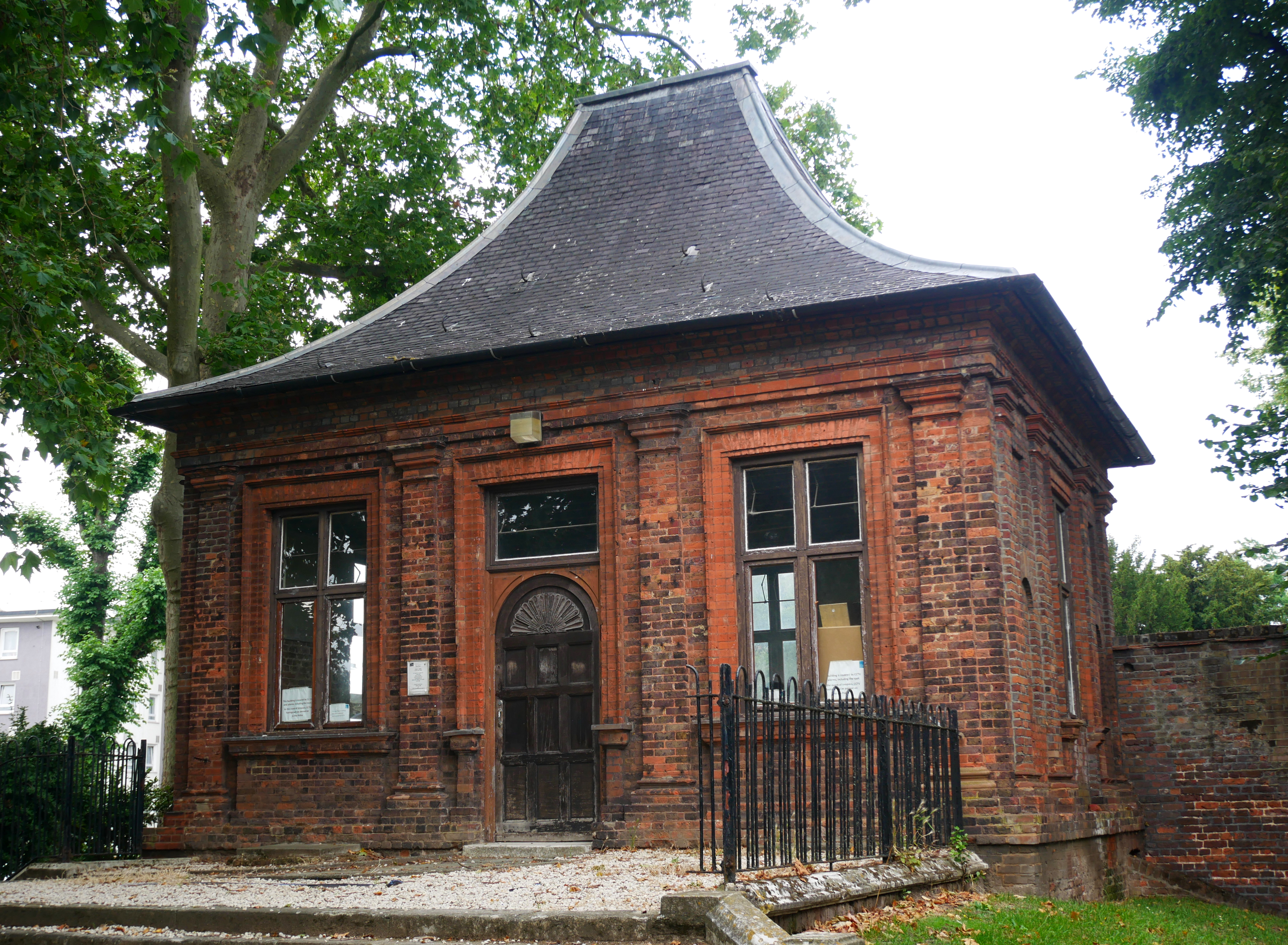
- "A handsome summerhouse"

- Location within Royal Borough of Greenwich
- 51.4812°N 0.0361°E
- Type: Summer house
- Location: Charlton, Greenwich, London

History
- Built: c.1630

Site notes
- Architect(s): attributed, without documentation, to Inigo Jones
- Architectural style: Jacobean
- Governing body: Royal Greenwich Heritage Trust

Listed Building – Grade I
- Official name: Garden House to North West of Charlton House
- Designated: 19 October 1951
- Reference no.: 1291892

The Garden house at Charlton House, in the Royal Borough of Greenwich, is a small red brick summer house with undercroft and high pyramidal swept roof dating from c.1630. The structure is often attributed to Inigo Jones, though there is no documentary evidence to support this claim. Its original purpose is unknown. In the 20th century, the building was adapted for use as a public lavatory, falling into dereliction after these facilities closed. Following placement on Historic England's Heritage at Risk Register, a conservation project completed in 2023 made the building secure and weathertight. It is a Grade I listed building.

== History ==
=== Construction and attribution ===
Charlton House was built between 1607–1612 for Sir Adam Newton, Dean of Durham and tutor to Prince Henry, eldest son of James I. Bridget Cherry and Nikolaus Pevsner, in their 2002 revised edition, London 2: South, of the Pevsner Buildings of England, date the garden house as slightly later, c.1630, describing it as mid to late 17th century.

The exact purpose of the building is uncertain; it has been described variously as a garden house, a pavilion, a banqueting house, a drinking house, an orangery, an armoury, and a summer house. Its architect is also unknown, but Cherry and Pevsner consider the traditional attribution to Inigo Jones as "quite justifiable". (Note: Bridget Cherry suggests Nicholas Stone as an alternative architect.) Jones, the pre-eminent architect of the Jacobean era, was appointed Surveyor-General of the King's Works in 1615 and undertook extensive work for James I and then for his son Charles, including the Queen's House at Greenwich, a short distance along the River Thames from Charlton House. Cherry finds support for the Jonesian attribution on stylistic grounds, noting the Tuscan pilasters and the "complete absence of Jacobean frills at such an early date".

=== Conversion and dereliction ===
Between the First and Second World Wars, the garden house was converted into a public lavatory. These facilities closed in the early 1990s, and by the 21st century the garden house had become derelict and was placed on Historic England's Heritage at Risk Register.

=== Conservation and restoration ===
The Royal Greenwich Heritage Trust commissioned a condition survey and heritage assessment which informed a development project completed in 2023, funded by Historic England. This project was designed to make the building secure and weathertight and to facilitate a meanwhile use. The Trust is considering next steps for the building's long-term use.

== Architecture and description ==
The garden house is constructed of red brick and comprises a single storey set on a basement (undercroft). It has a high roof in a pyramidal style with swept eaves. It is a Grade I listed building.

== Sources ==
- Cherry, Bridget; Pevsner, Nikolaus (2002). London 2: South. The Buildings of England. New Haven, US and London: Yale University Press. ISBN 978-0-300-09651-4. OCLC 844260066.
- Summerson, John (1953). Architecture in Britain: 1530–1830. Pelican History of Art. Harmondsworth, UK: Penguin Books. OCLC 1195758004.
