= Banqueting house =

Type of building and part of Tudor and Early Stuart English architecture

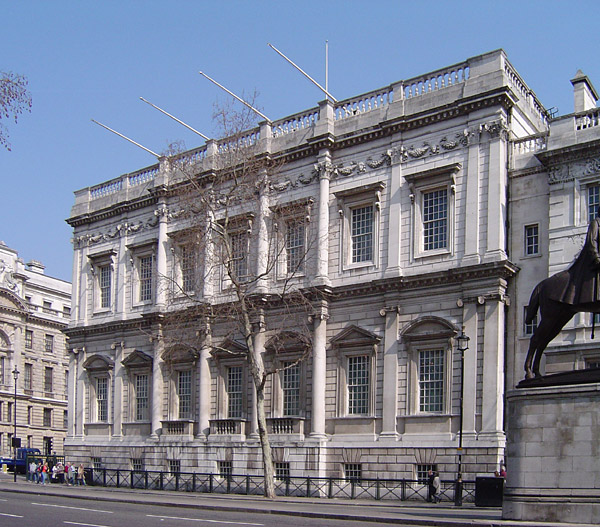
Banqueting House, Whitehall, London

In English architecture, mainly from the Tudor period onwards, a banqueting house is a separate pavilion-like building reached through the gardens from the main residence, whose use is purely for entertaining, especially eating. Or it may be built on the roof of a main house, as in many 16th-century prodigy houses. It may be raised for additional air or a vista, with a simple kitchen below, as at Hampton Court Palace and Wrest Park, and it may be richly decorated, but it normally contains no bedrooms, and typically a single grand room apart from any service spaces. The design is often ornamental, if not downright fanciful, and some are also follies, as in Paxton's Tower. There are usually plenty of windows, as appreciating the view was a large part of their purpose. Often they are built on a slope, so that from the front, only the door to the main room can be seen; the door to the servants' spaces underneath was hidden at the back (Wrest Park). The Banqueting House, Gibside is an example.

In the English of the period, "banquet" had two distinct meanings: firstly a grand formal celebratory meal (the usual modern sense), but also a course or light meal taken in a special place away from the main dining place, the relevant sense here (Whitehall apart). In large meals a banqueting house was most likely to be used for eating dessert, if reasonably close to the main house. Otherwise it might be used on fine days for taking tea, or any kind of drink, snack or meal.

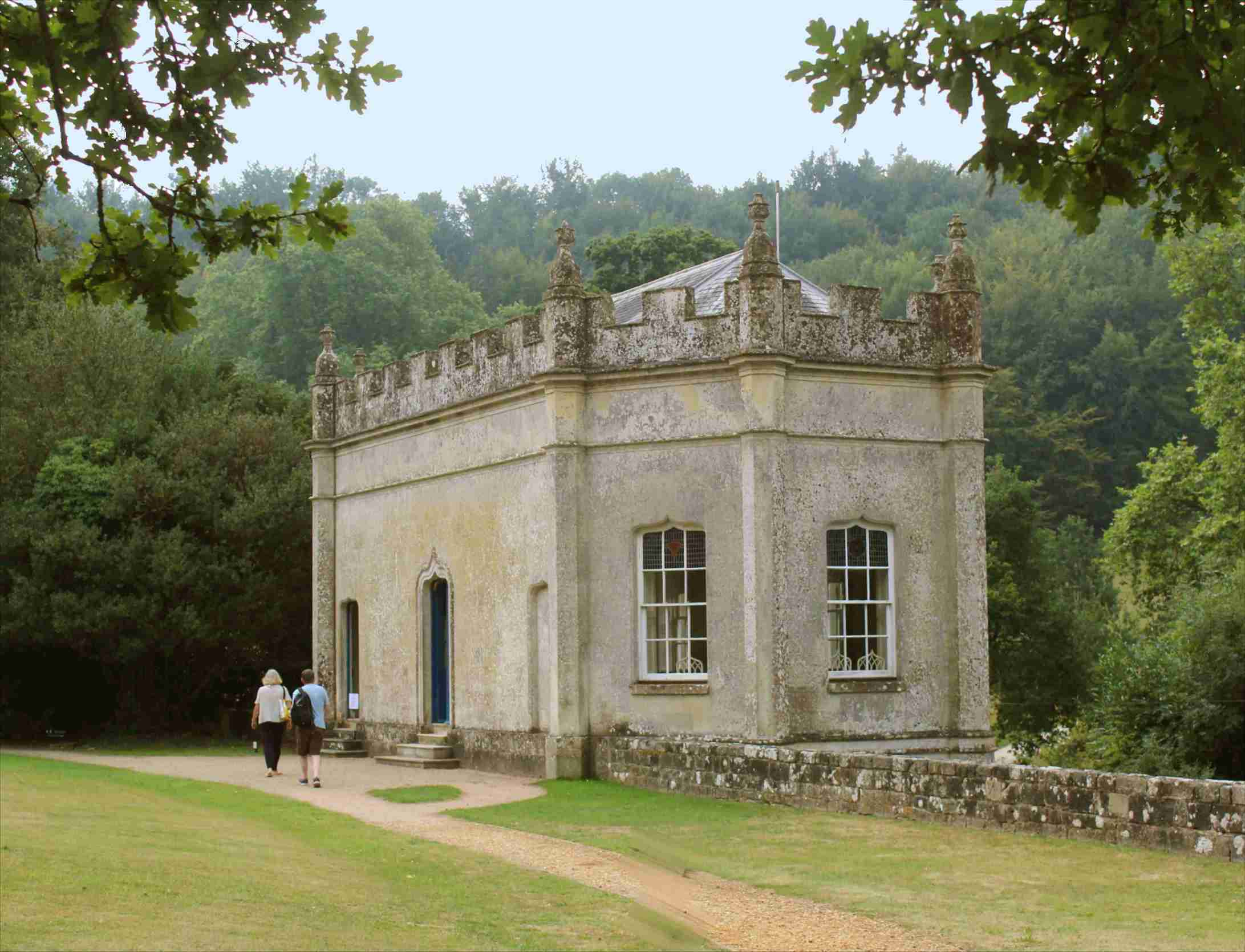
Wardour Castle, Banqueting House

The best known example, though far larger than most, is the Banqueting House on Whitehall, once part of Whitehall Palace. This is a grand dining hall for full formal meals, and what may be called in distinction a banqueting hall. Such buildings were created in various settings, for example at Cholmley House next to Whitby Abbey, which had been converted into a country house. Most banqueting houses fitted at most twenty people, and many fewer.

Similar buildings, under various names such as "pavilion", appear in the architecture of European and many Asian countries. Its contemporary Italian equivalent was a casina; the Casina Pio IV in the grounds of the Vatican Palace, (1550s-1560s) is an architecturally important example. Large French examples, like the Château du Grand Jardin of the House of Guise are called a maison de plaisance (house of pleasures).

== British examples ==
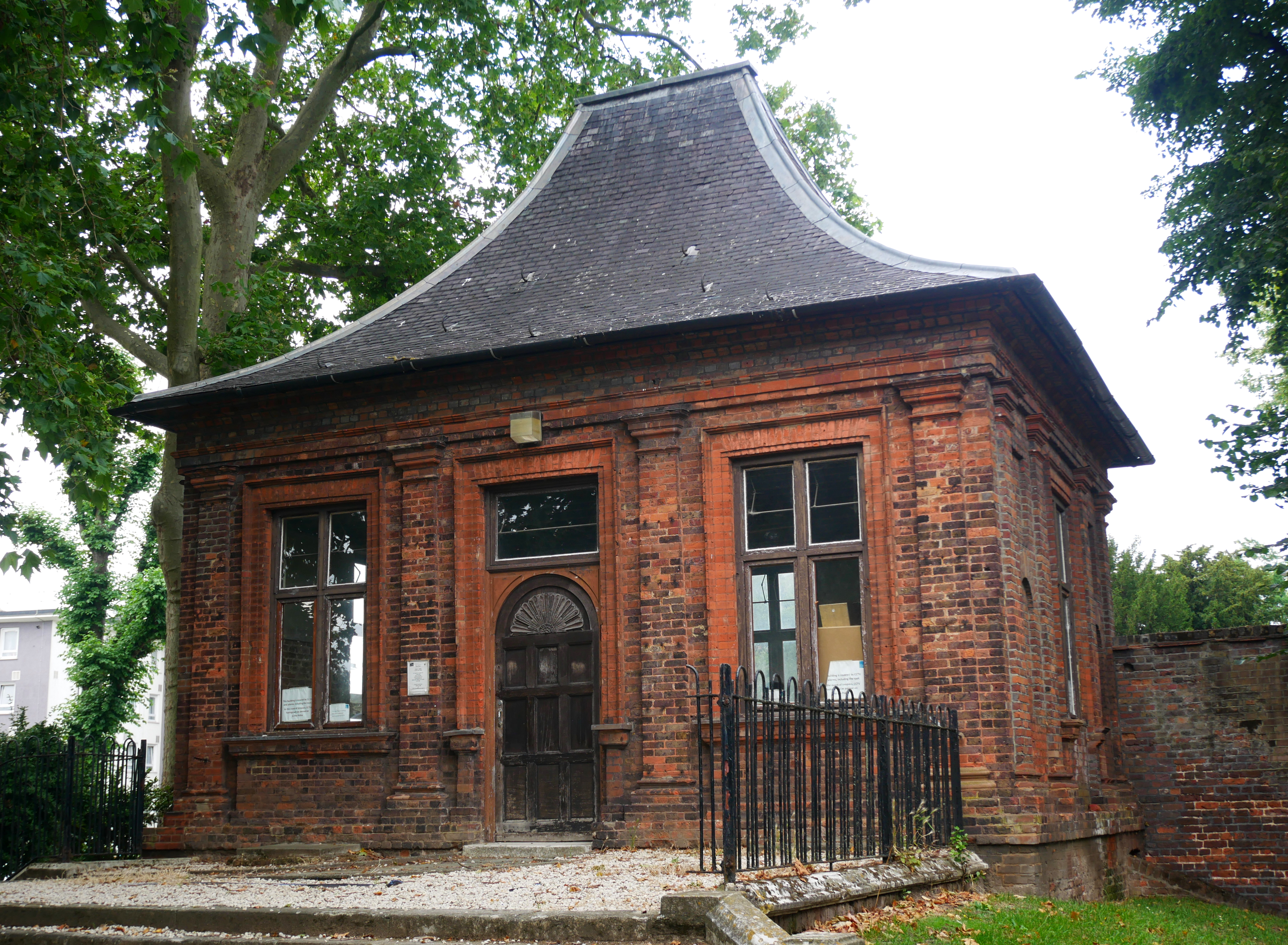
Garden house at Charlton House, London, 1630s

- Banqueting House, Whitehall, the largest and best known, in Central London, now virtually the only surviving part of Whitehall Palace
- Hampton Court Palace, two floors, with a view over the river Thames. Designed by William Talman.
- Studley Royal Park, initially called the "Temple of Venus"
- Wardour Castle, 1770s. Built besides the newly picturesque ruins of the "Old Castle", a victim of the English Civil War, a short walk from New Wardour Castle.
- Banqueting House, Gibside, early Gothick
- Wrest Park
- Garden house at Charlton House, London, 1630s
- Kings Weston House, now destroyed
- Westbury Court Garden, two storeys; the house has gone.
- Swarkestone Hall Pavilion, two storeys, 1630s.
- Cholmley House, 1672, very large, with eleven bays and two storeys.
- Drayton Manor, three storeys, demolished by Sir Robert Peel
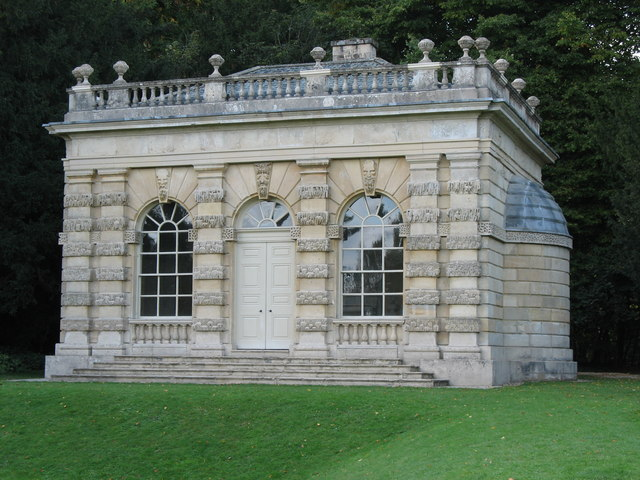
Studley Royal Park

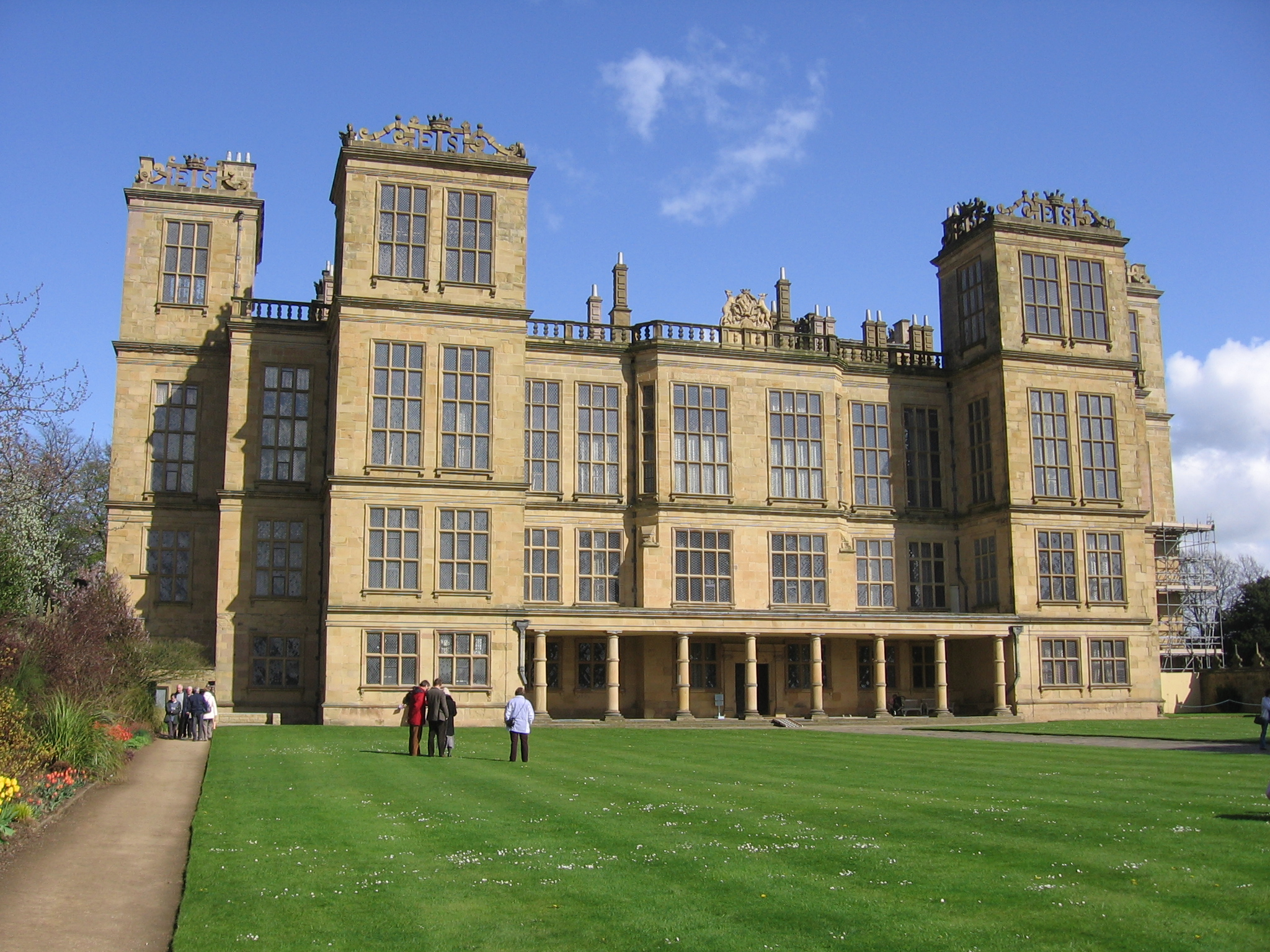
Hardwick Hall, built 1590–97, has six banqueting houses on the top of the towers, reached only across the roof leads

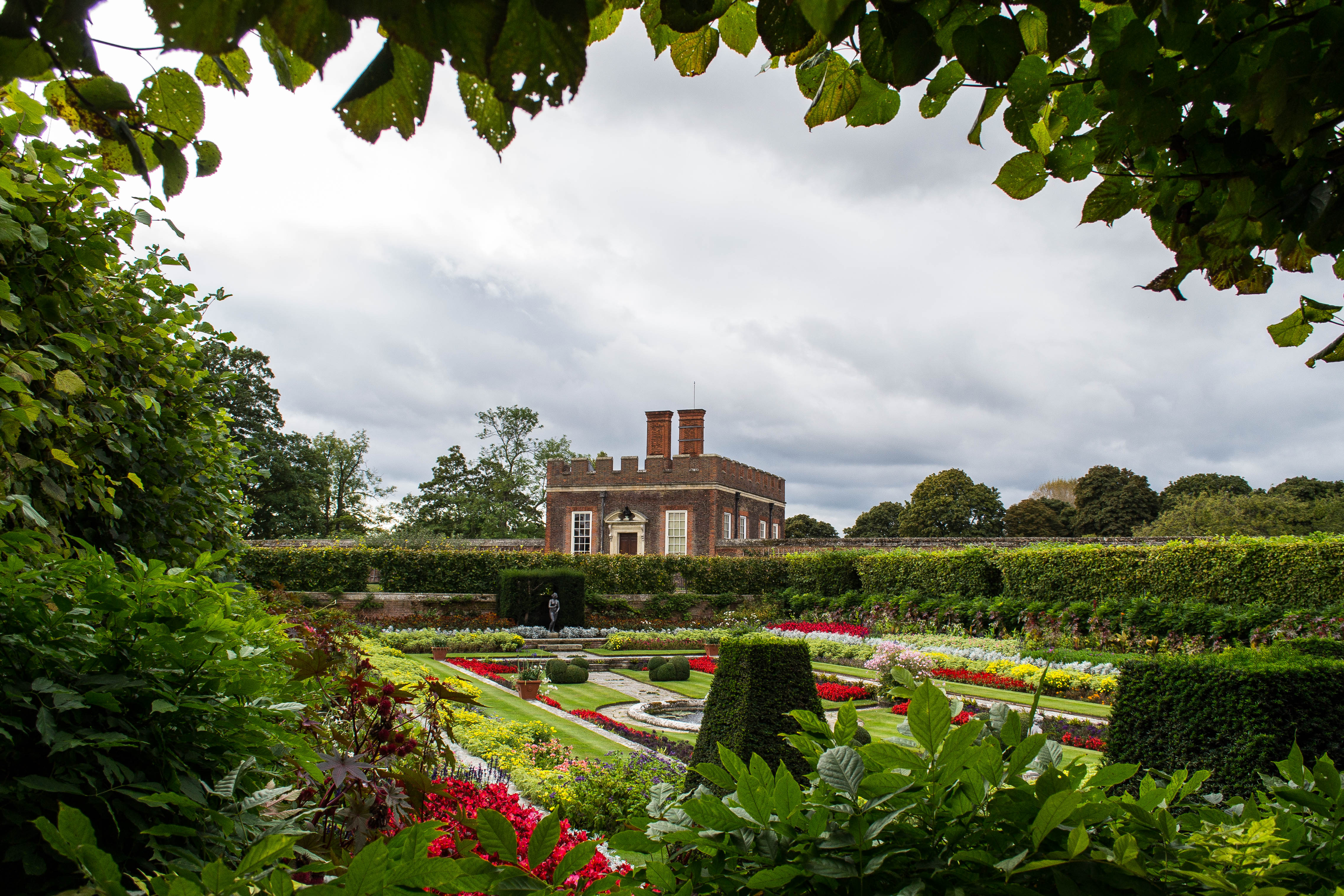
The banqueting house at Hampton Court Palace

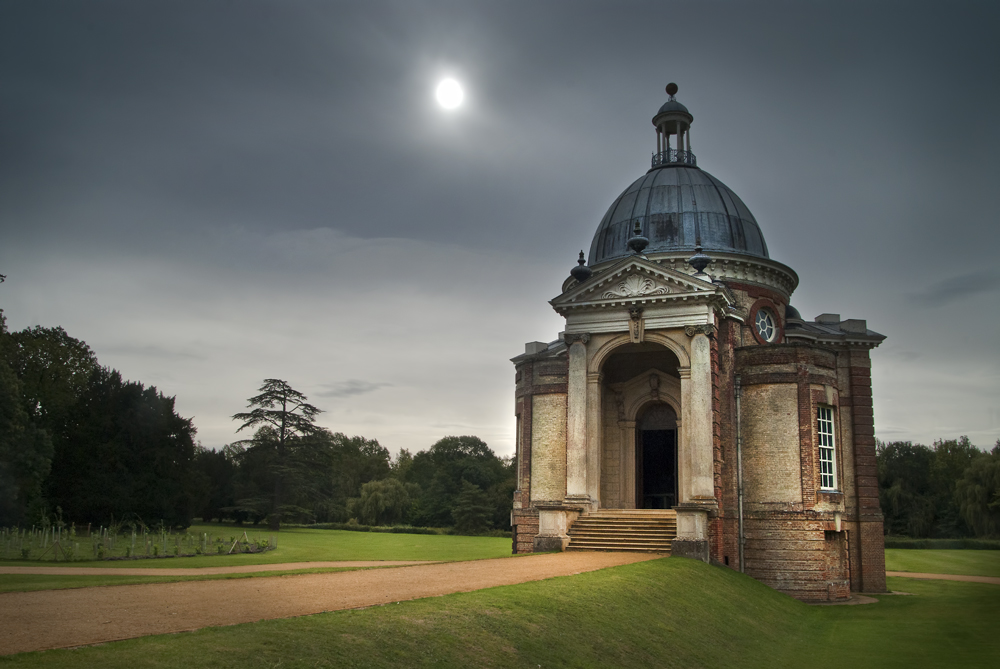
Wrest Park Banqueting House, Thomas Archer, 1711

== See also ==
- Palace of Facets
