= Banqueting House, Gibside =

Banqueting house

Coordinates: 54.916382°N 1.720733°W

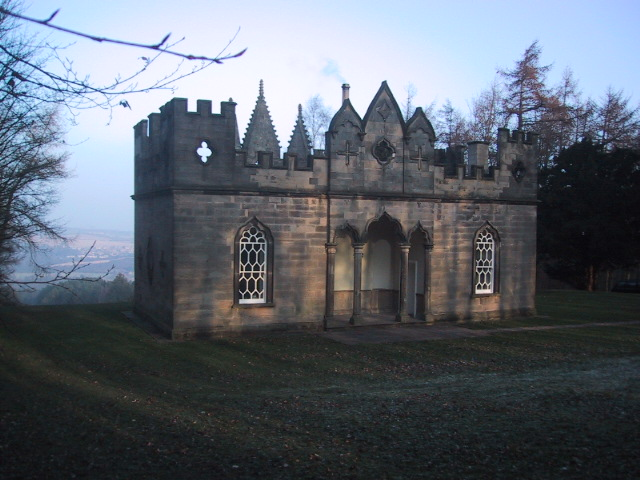
The Banqueting House, Gibside

The Banqueting House is an 18th-century building, part of the Gibside estate, near Newcastle upon Tyne, England. Its style has been described as "Gothick".

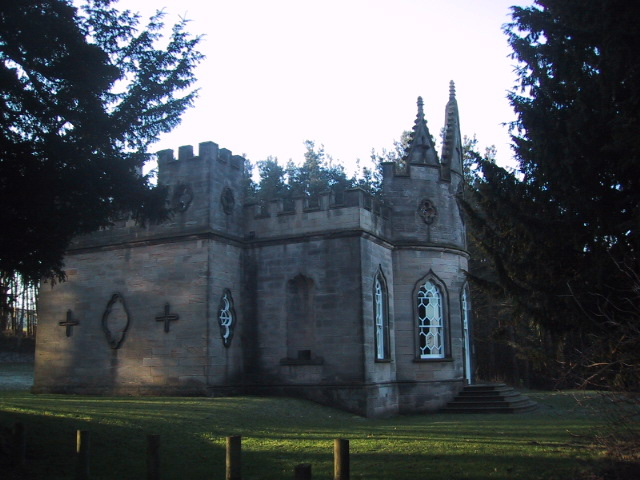
Another view

A banqueting house is defined as a separate building reached through pleasure gardens from the main residence, whose use is purely for entertaining. The Gibside house was constructed in 1746, designed by Daniel Garrett for Sir George Bowes, much of whose large landholdings had coal underneath them, making him extremely wealthy. It stands in the highest part of the estate with fine views over the Derwent Valley. It contains three rooms: the main hall, which is 32 ft (9.8 m) across, and two smaller ante-chambers. The estate fell into disrepair after it was left empty in the 1920s, and the Banqueting House itself soon became a derelict shell. The estate was eventually gifted to the National Trust by the Earl of Strathmore; they in turn leased parts of it to the Forestry Commission.

== Conservation ==
The Landmark Trust, after negotiating a partial surrender of the Forestry Commission's lease, acquired the Banqueting House in 1977 and set to work restoring and renovating the property, with the work completed by 1981.
