= William Newton (architect, 1735–1790) =

British architect

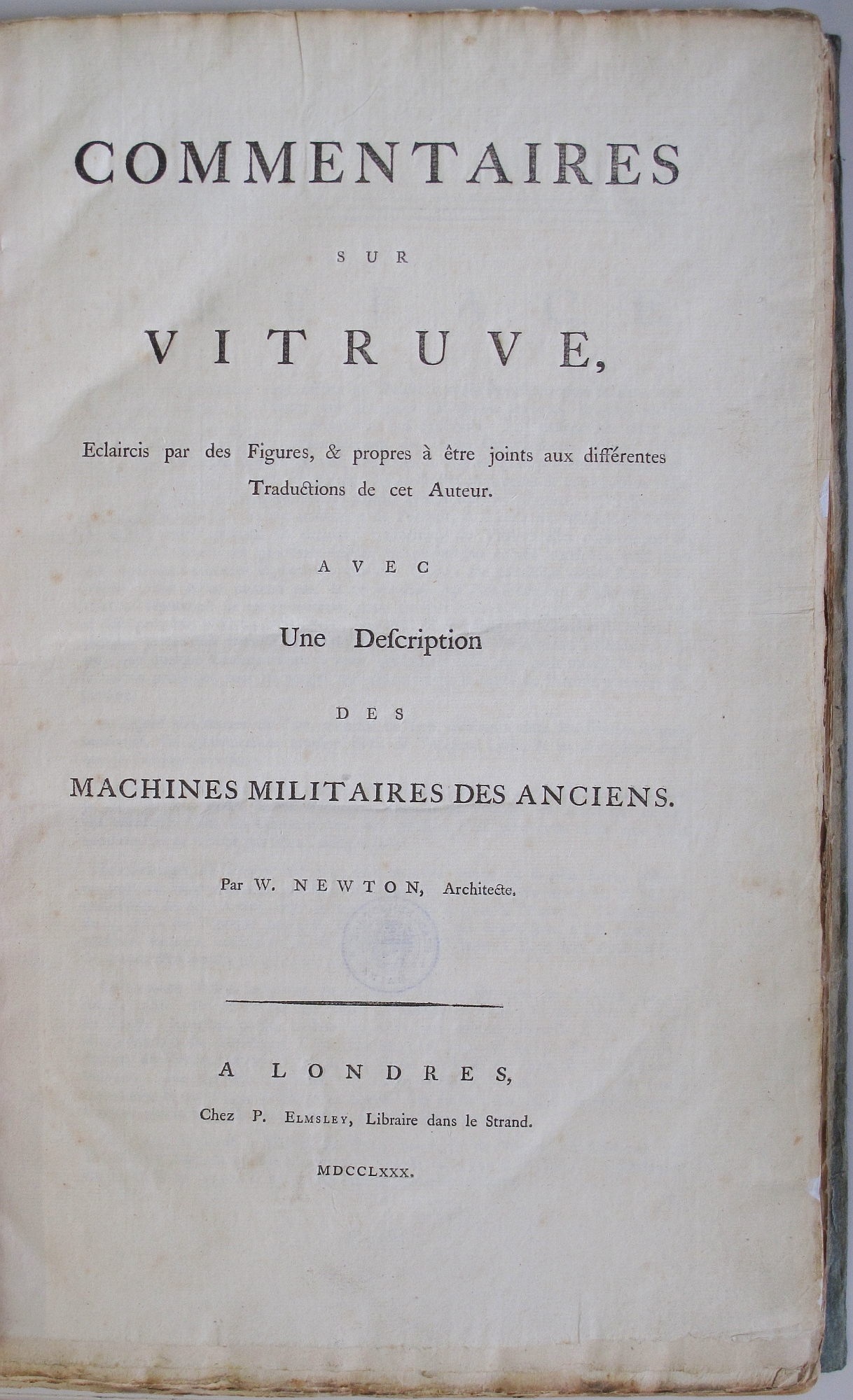
Commentaires sur Vitruve. Eclaircis par des figures, & propres à etre joints aux différentes traductions de cet auteur. Avec Une description des machines militaires des anciens by W. Newton

William Newton (1735–1790) was a British architect.

== Life ==
Born on 27 October 1735, he was eldest son of James Newton, a cabinet-maker, of Holborn, London, and Susanna, daughter of Humphrey Ditton. Admitted to Christ's Hospital on 25 November 1743, he left, on 1 December 1750, to become apprentice to William Jones, architect, of King Street, London.

In 1766 Newton travelled in Italy and spent some time in Rome. On his return he joined the Incorporated Society of Artists, and exhibited at the Royal Academy in 1776–80. For many years he was mainly occupied in designing residences in London and vicinity. In 1775 he built a house for Sir John Borlase-Warren at Marlow, Buckinghamshire.

He seems to have assisted William Jupp the elder in his design (1765–8) of the London Tavern, Bishopsgate Street Within, he designed the ballroom and eating-room and to have been successful in the field of interior decoration.

Towards the end of 1781 James Stuart and his clerk of the works Robert Mylne fell out while working on Greenwich Hospital. In September Stuart, then in ill-health, asked Newton to assist him with the designs for rebuilding Greenwich Chapel. Newton was appointed Stuart's assistant by the committee in February 1782, and later clerk of the works in succession to Mylne, an appointment confirmed by the board on 24 December 1782. From that time he produced nearly all the decorative ornamentation for Greenwich Chapel, and superintended its execution.

Stuart died on 2 February 1788 and Newton completed Greenwich Chapel two years later, and carried out other works connected with the hospital. Unlike his earlier work, which was in the Palladian style, the Greenwich Chapel is Greek in style. In 1789 John Cooke and John Maule, in their Historical Account of Greenwich Hospital, gave Stuart sole credit for the chapel. Newton publicly declared that the credit of the design belonged to him, and detailed the small portion of the work designed by Stuart.

Newton, himself in bad health due to overwork, left Greenwich on a three months' leave of absence, for a course of sea-bathing, on 10 February 1790, and died soon after, on 6 July, at Sidford, near Sidmouth, Devon.

== Works ==
In 1771 Newton published the earliest English translation of the first five books of Vitruvius, as De Architectura libri decem, written by Marcus Vitruvius Pollio. In 1780 he issued, in French, Commentaires sur Vitruve, with many plates. The complete work of Vitruvius (including a translation of the remaining five books) was published after Newton's death in two volumes, 1791, by his brother and executor, James Newton. Of the plates, a few only were by William, the majority being by James.

Newton helped to complete and publish James Stuart's Antiquities of Athens, which appeared in 1787.

== Notes ==
Attribution

This article incorporates text from a publication now in the public domain: Lee, Sidney, ed. (1894). "Newton, William (1735-1790)". Dictionary of National Biography. Vol. 40. London: Smith, Elder & Co.
