= Cultural depictions of James VI and I =

James VI and I has been depicted a number of times in popular culture.

== Theatrical depictions ==
James was first depicted in depth for the modern stage in the four-act comedy Jamie the Saxt (1936) by Scottish playwright Robert McLellan. Set in Scotland in the years 1592–94, McLellan's play depicts the King's various conflicts with the Kirk and his Scottish nobles, most particularly with the outlawed Francis Stewart, 5th Earl of Bothwell, in the aftermath of the murder of James Stewart, 2nd Earl of Moray. The play The Burning (1971) by Stewart Conn deals similarly with events in the same period, but with a greater and more serious focus on James's persecution of witchcraft. The King also plays a significant role in Howard Brenton's Anne Boleyn (2010) depicted at the moment of his arrival in London around 1603. Of the three characterisations, Brenton's is the only one which touches comfortably on James's likely bisexuality. Common to all three characterisations, however, is a portrait, established by McLellan, of self-willed, seemingly cranky and almost arbitrary love of intellectual disputation for its own sake which belies an ultimately wily style of diplomacy.

== Film and television ==
On screen, James has been portrayed by:

- Lucien Littlefield in To Have and to Hold (1916), a silent adaptation of the novel To Have and to Hold
- Raymond Hatton in To Have and to Hold (1922), another silent adaptation of To Have and to Hold
- Jerrold Robertshaw in the British silent film Guy Fawkes (1923), based on the novel by Harrison Ainsworth
- Jean Kircher and Judith Kircher in Mary of Scotland (1936)
- Manfred Mackeben as a young child in the German film Das Herz der Königin (1940), about his mother Mary
- William Podmore in The King's Author (1952), in the American TV series Hallmark Hall of Fame
- Anthony Eustrel in Captain John Smith and Pocahontas (1953)
- Everett Sloane in The King's Bounty (1955), in the American TV series Kraft Television Theatre
- Bill Paterson in the ATV drama series Life of Shakespeare (1978)
- Patrick Malahide in the "Treason" episode of the HTV West children's TV series Into the Labyrinth (1981), about the Gunpowder Plot
- Hugh Ross in the Ulster Television series God's Frontiersmen (1988)
- Dudley Sutton in Orlando (1992)
- Angus MacDonald in Kings and Queens of England Volume II (1994)
- Jim Cummings (voice) in the straight-to-video animated film Pocahontas II: Journey to a New World (1998)
- Wayne Opie in the TV drama documentary Elizabeth (2000)
- Jeremy Irons in the PBS TV series Freedom: A History of Us (2003)
- Robert Carlyle in the BBC TV series Gunpowder, Treason & Plot (2004)
- Ewen Bremner in the TV miniseries Elizabeth I (2005)
- Jonathan Pryce in The New World (2005)
- James Clyde in Anonymous (2011)
- Kevin Little at the New York Renaissance Faire (2012)
- Jake Foy in the TV series Reign (2017)
- Mathew Baynton/Laurence Rickard/Jalaal Hartley/Richard David-Caine in Horrible Histories and its later reboot
- Derrek Riddell in the BBC TV series Gunpowder
- Dr. Spencer M Dayton at several Renaissance Festivals throughout Northern California (2017-Present)
- Alan Cumming in the Doctor Who episode "The Witchfinders" (2018)
- Tony Curran in the British historical drama television miniseries Mary & George

== Literature ==
- James features in the novel The Fortunes of Nigel by Walter Scott (1822).
- James is a character in the novel To Have and to Hold by Mary Johnston (1900).
- James' life in Scotland is the subject of the novel When Love Calls Men To Arms (1912) by Stephen Chalmers.
- James is the subject of the biographical novel Mine is the Kingdom (1937) by "Jane Oliver" (the pseudonym of Helen Christina Easson Rees).
- James acts as something of the antagonist in the comic series Marvel 1602 and its sequels (2003).
- Rafael Sabatini's novel The King's Minion (1930) portrays James as physically attracted to the young Robert Carr and George Villiers and implicates him in the murder of Sir Thomas Overbury.

== Prints ==
- James I was depicted in The Revells of Christendome, an anti-pope satire print engraved by the English artist Thomas Cockson in 1609.
