= The Model of Poesy =

Renaissance English treatise about the art of poetry

The Model of Poesy (1599), by William Scott, is a Renaissance-era (15th–17th c.), English literary treatise about the art of poetry, which presents a theoretical description of what is poetry, and practical guidelines about how to write well. Proceeding from An Apology for Poetry (1595), by Philip Sidney, The Model of Poesy develops Scott's poetics in the classical and continental traditions, using examples from Geoffrey Chaucer and Edmund Spenser, William Shakespeare and quotations from Scott's partial, English translation of the French La Sepmaine (1578), by Guillaume de Salluste du Bartas.

== Author ==
William Scott was born in Kent, England, in the early 1570s and died in 1617. As a student of law at the Inner Temple, Scott wrote and completed much of The Model of Poesy in summer of 1599. He dedicated his translation to English of Du Bartas's La Sepmaine (1578) to his uncle George Wyatt of Boxley (1553–1624), who was the sole, surviving son of Thomas Wyatt the Younger (1521–1554), the leader of Wyatt's rebellion (1554), and grandson of the Henrician poet Thomas Wyatt (1503–1542). Consequent to dedicating The Model of Poesy to Henry Lee of Ditchley, Scott entered his employment and served as MP for New Woodstock, in 1601. In 1604, he went to Russia as part of Sir Thomas Smythe’s embassy to Tsar Boris Godunov (r. 1598–1605). In private life, William Scott married Barbara Tomlyn, in either 1610 or 1611, and settled in Westenhanger, Kent.

== Summary ==
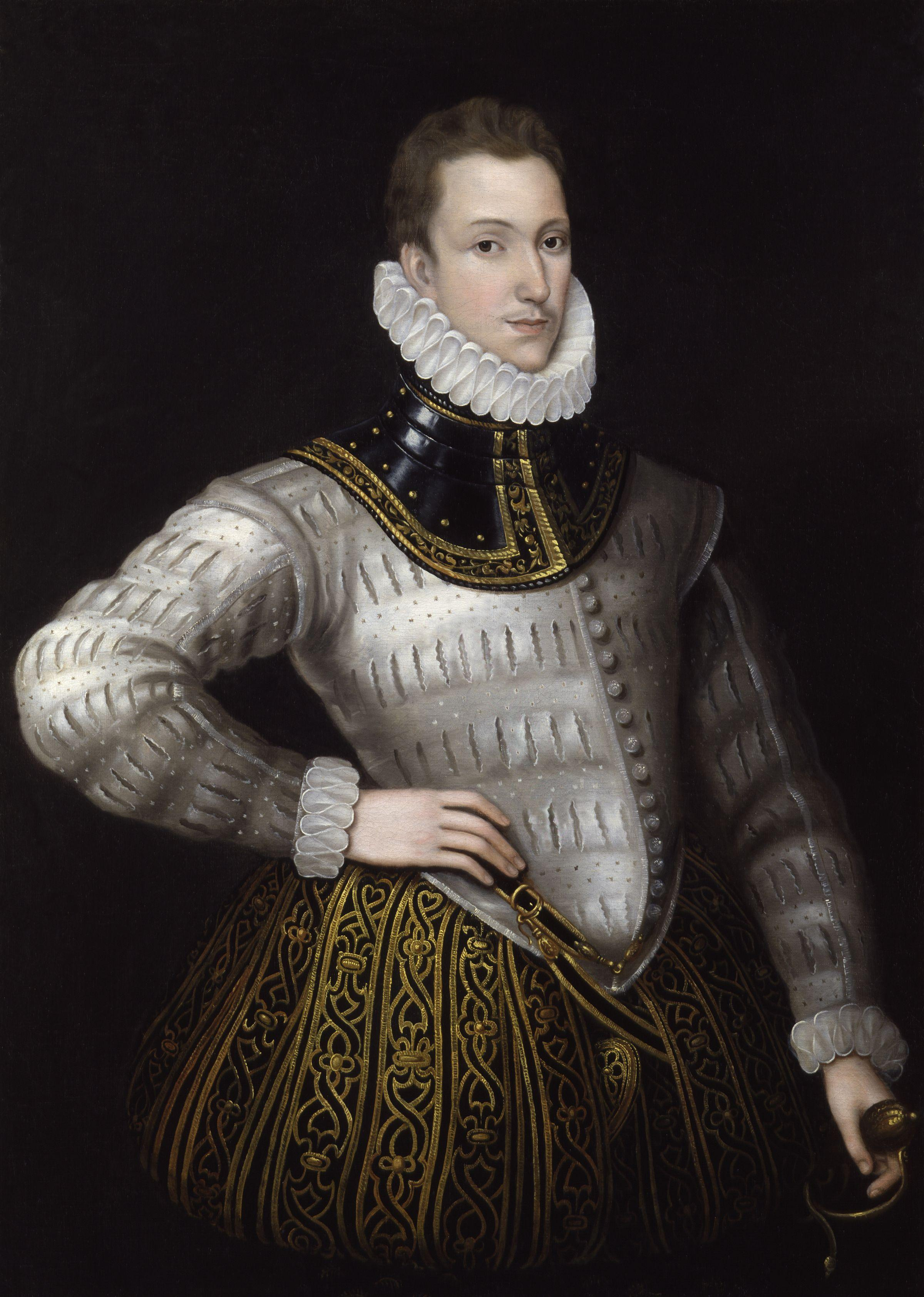
Philip Sidney’s crititical work in An Apology for Poetry (1595) was a key precedent for Scott's treatise, The Model of Poesy (1599).

The treatise of The Model of Poesy (1599) is in three sections; in the first section, Scott defines poetry and makes clear his debts to earlier theorists:

All antiquity, following their great leader Aristotle, have defined poetry to be an art of imitation, or an instrument of reason, that consists in laying down the rules and way how in style to feign or represent things, with delight to teach to move us to good; as if one should say with the lyric Simonides (after whom Sir Philip Sidney saith) the poem is a speaking or wordish picture.

Scott then discusses the genus (matter), difference (form), and end (purpose) of poetry, dealing with creative questions such as the source of poetic inspiration and the temperament required of the poet.

The second section discusses the genres of poetry: heroic, pastoral, and tragedy, comedy, satire, and lyric. The third section discusses poetic practice: about what subjects to write; what are the distinctive qualities of good poetry; and what rules of composition apply to individual genres of poetry. Examples from classical and modern poetry illustrate how poetry achieves its purposes: to teach, to move, and to delight the reader. Proceeding from the work of scholar Julius Caesar Scaliger (1484–1558), Scott dwells upon the four virtues of poetry, which apply to the poet's choice of matter (genus) and style of writing, noting that Scaliger:

observes that to strike with the pleasure of our poem the doors of men’s sense, these four virtues are especially requisite: first a proportionableness or uniformity; secondly variety; thirdly sweetness; lastly that energeia, force effectualness, or vigour, which is the character of passion and life of persuasion and motion.

== Literary influences ==
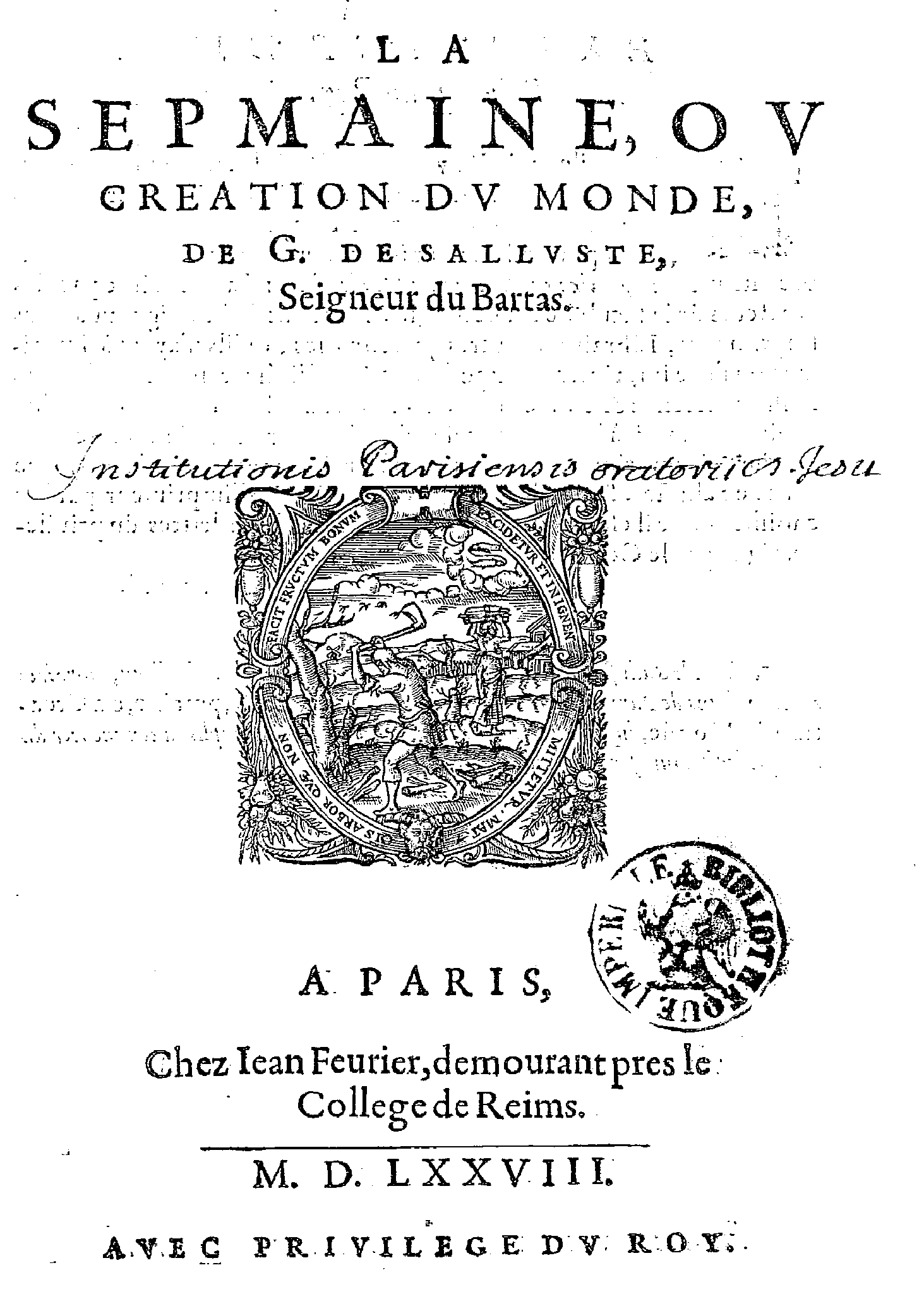
La Sepmaine, ou creation du mond (1578), by Guillaume de Salluste du Bartas. In The Model of Poesy (1599), Scott's praise of du Bartas is followed by Scott's translation of the first two days of The Week, or the Creation of the World.

William Scott's knowledge of Classical literature included works by Aristotle (the Organon and the Nicomachean Ethics), Horace (Ars Poetica), Quintilian, Cicero, and Plutarch (Parallel Lives), and contemporary works by the scholar Julius Caesar Scaliger (Poetices libri septem), Giovanni Antonio Viperano (De poeti libri tres), Baldassare Castiglione (Il Libro del Cortegiano), and Gian Paolo Lomazzo (Trattato dell'arte della pittura, scoltura et architettura).

The poetical works of Philip Sidney were central to Scott's conceptions of what is poetry and of what poetry can achieve; in The Model of Poesy he cites Sidney's Astrophel and Stella, the Arcadia and An Apology for Poetry. The editor Gavin Alexander said that "The Model of Poesy is a commentary upon The Defence of Poesy, adopting its basic theory [of poetics], filling in its gaps, interrogating and weighing its sources, glossing and elaborating its difficulties. But it is also a very different sort of work, a much more ambitious and comprehensive exercise inspired by the Defence but not bounded or constrained by it."

Scott also knew the contemporary poetry of his time, such as the Rape of Lucrece, by Shakespeare, which he twice quotes, and alludes to the garden scene in Richard II; he knew the Latin plays Gorboduc and The Mirror for Magistrates, by George Buchanan; Troilus and Criseyde, by Geoffrey Chaucer; The Civil Wars, by Samuel Daniel; Englands Heroical Epistles, by Michael Drayton; the Shepheardes Calendar, the View of the Present State of Ireland, and the Faerie Queene, by Edmund Spenser; Saint Peter’s Complaint, by Robert Southwell, the works of Sir Thomas Wyatt; and the works of the Italian poets Ludovico Ariosto, Torquato Tasso, and Giovanni Batista Guarini.

Well known in English literary circles in the 1590s, the French poet Guillaume de Salluste du Bartas held pride of place in Scott's literary thinking, as a model of Protestant poetry. About La Sepmaine, ou la creation du monde (1578), Scott said that "our incomparable Bartas" has "opened as much natural science in one week, containing the story of Creation, as all the rabble of schoolmen and philosophers have done since Plato and Aristotle" and "hath minced and sugared [divine teachings] for the weakest and tenderest stomach, yet thoroughly to satisfice the strongest judgement". His English translations of the first two days of La Sepmaine, by Du Bartas, are linked to The Model of Poesy as a demonstration of Scott's literary theories (several times quoted in the treatise) and a text with similar words, imagery, and ideas.

== Manuscript ==
The extant copy of The Modell of Poesye: Or The Arte of Poesye drawen into a short or Summary Discourse is in the British Library, registered as Additional Manuscript 81083, in the archives and manuscript catalogue. The Modell of Poesye is in folios 1–49, which manuscripts are written in an italic, scribal hand, and throughout contain scribal, authorial, and authorized corrections; at least one eight-page gathering, near the beginning of the manuscript, has been lost. The dedicatory letter to Sir Henry Lee introduces Scott's treatise of poetics, and he describes The Modell of Poesye as ‘the first fruits of my study.’ Folios 51–76 contain a partial translation of the first two days of La Sepmaine (1578), by Guillaume de Salluste du Bartas. Scott's English translation ends mid-sentence, during ‘The Second Day’, and some lines of text are illegible, because of water damage to the manuscript.

== Modern Edition ==
In 2013, the Cambridge University Press published an edition of The Model of Poesy, edited by Gavin Alexander, with a textual introduction that discusses the life of William Scott; the literary context and sources (Classical and continental) for The Modell of Poesye (1599); the literature of the late-Elizabethan period; the visual arts of that era; and the literary and poetical background established by Philip Sidney and Guillaume de Salluste du Bartas. The contemporary edition of The Model of Poesy uses modern English spelling and punctuation; however, an original edition of The Modell of Poesye (G. Alexander, Ed.) using 16th-century spelling, pagination, and lineation, is available as a free download from the Cambridge University Press website.

In a book review for Spenser Studies, the critic Roger Kuin commended editor Alexander's thorough work in making accessible a literary text of ‘incalculable value’ to scholars and students of English Renaissance literature: ‘for anyone working, in any way, with the literature and the literary scene of the sixteenth century’s last two or three decades, Scott’s Model is indispensable.’ In 2015, a special issue of the Sidney Journal presented the significance of The Model of Poesy for students and scholars of Elizabethan literature, and identifies areas of further research.
