= Guillaume de Salluste Du Bartas =

French courtier and poet

Guillaume de Salluste, Seigneur Du Bartas
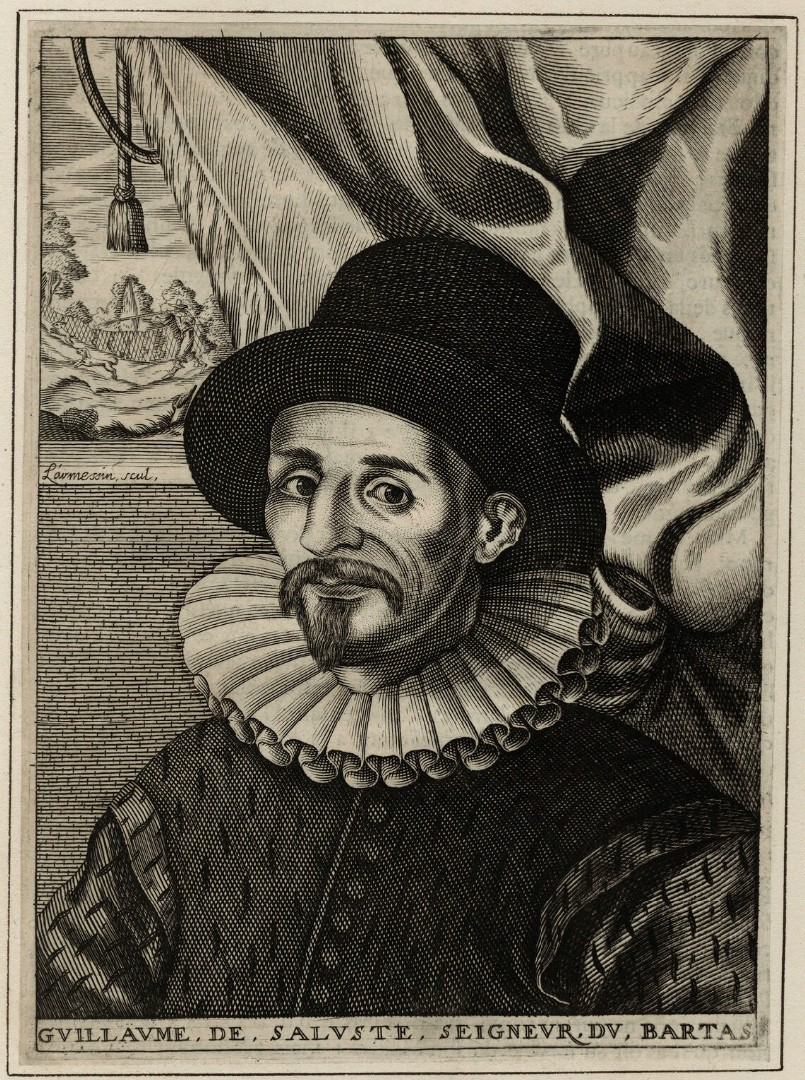
- Engraving of Du Bartas (Nicolas de Larmessin, possibly late 17th to early 18th century)
- Born: 1544
- Died: 1590 (aged 45–46)
- Occupations: courtier and poet

Guillaume de Salluste du Bartas (Occitan: Guilhèm de Sallusti deu Bartàs, IPA: [ɡiˈʎɛm de salˈlysti ðeu βarˈtas]; 1544, in Monfort – July 1590, in Mauvezin) was a Gascon Huguenot courtier and poet. Trained as a doctor of law, he served in the court of Henri of Navarre for most of his career. Du Bartas was celebrated across sixteenth- and seventeenth-century Europe for his divine poetry, particularly L'Uranie (1574), Judit (1574), La Sepmaine; ou, Creation du monde (1578), and La Seconde Semaine (1584-1603).

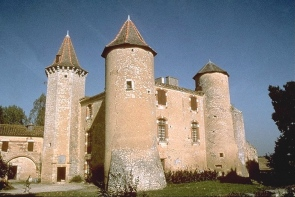
Château du Bartas (built 1569)

== Life ==
Relatively little is known about du Bartas' life. Guillaume Sallustre was born in 1544 to a family of wealthy merchants in Montfort (in the Armagnac region). His family name later became 'Salluste' rather than 'Sallustre', perhaps to invite comparison with the Roman historian Sallust. He was possibly a student at College de Guyenne in Bordeaux (Michel de Montaigne’s school), and studied law in Toulouse under Jacques Cujas; he became a doctor of law in 1567 and a judge in Montfort in 1571. He gained the lordship of nearby Bartas (becoming Seigneur du Bartas) on his father's death in 1566. In 1570 he married Catherine de Manas, a local noblewoman, and they had four daughters together: Anne, Jeanne, Marie and Isabeau.

He entered the service of Henry of Navarre in 1576, who would become Henry IV of France in 1589. He was sent on various diplomatic missions, including to Montmorency in 1580, and Scotland and England in 1587. Henry of Navarre gave him 1,000 Écu as expenses.

Du Bartas came to Falkland Palace in July 1587 to discuss plans for James VI of Scotland to marry Henry's sister Catherine of Bourbon. He spent his time at Falkland with King James hunting deer and hare. They visited the University of St Andrews where Andrew Melville gave a lecture criticising James's management of the kirk.

The poet left Scotland from Dumbarton Castle for La Rochelle laden with presents. King James hired one of the best ships in the kingdom for him, knighted him, and gave him a gold chain and 2000 gold crowns, "with a tablett of gold, having in itt his Majesties pourtraict", besides several hackney horses and other presents from the nobility and courtiers.

He died in 1590, just weeks after composing a poem that celebrated Henry's victory at the Battle of Ivry, though it is not thought that he fought in the battle.

Château Du Bartas, at Saint Georges, was du Bartas' residence in the later part of his life. A statue of du Bartas stands in a square named after him in Auch, the historic capital of Gascony.

== Poetry ==
=== La muse chrestienne ===
Du Bartas began writing poetry in the 1560s after being invited to do so by Jeanne d'Albret of Navarre. His first collection, La muse chrestienne (1574) contains ‘L’Uranie’, a verse prosopographia (vivid description of someone's face or character) in which the Christian muse urges the poet to commit himself to composing serious poetry on scriptural themes. The other two items in the volume, the biblical epic Judit and 'Le Triomphe de la Foi', were examples of this new religious verse.

=== The Semaines ===
Du Bartas' masterpiece is his Semaines ('Weeks'), two epic poems which freely expand on the account in the Book of Genesis of the creation of the world and the first eras of world history. Each Semaine consists of individual jours (days) which can be read separately.

==== La Semaine, ou creation du Monde ====
La Semaine, ou creation du Monde ('The Week, or creation of the World'), subsequently also known as La Premiere Sepmaine, was first printed in Paris in 1578, and was immediately popular. La Sepmaine is a hexameral poem consisting of seven jours, each containing around 700 lines, devoted to the aspect of the world created on that day in the first week. Because the poem's structure follows Genesis 1:1-8 closely, it is easy to navigate to particular sections; for example, readers wanting to find what du Bartas writes about cuttlefish or mullet could know to turn to 'Le Cinquiesme Jour' (The Fifth Day) and in most editions would have had marginal annotations to help them locate the description of each creature.

'Le Premier Jour' (The First Day) describes the creation of the world out of chaos (du Bartas advocates the theory of creation ex nihilo - 'Nothing, but Nothing had the Lord Almighty, | Whereof, wherewith, whereby, to build this City' (Sylvester, I.i.228-29), forecasts the Day of Judgement and concludes with a discussion of angels. 'Le Second Jour' (The Second Day) concerns the creation of the four elements - water, air, earth and fire - and their meteorological effects. Land, seas and vegetation are created in 'Le Troisiesme Jour' (The Third Day). The earth is populated with particular species of natural life during the next three days: the sun, stars and seasons in 'Le Quatriesme Jour' (The Fourth Day); fish and birds in 'Le Cinquiesme Jour' (The Fifth Day); and land animals and human beings in 'Le Sixiesme Jour' (The Sixth Day). In 'Le Septiesme Jour' (The Seventh Day) God surveys the world he has created, and the poet meditates on the created world.

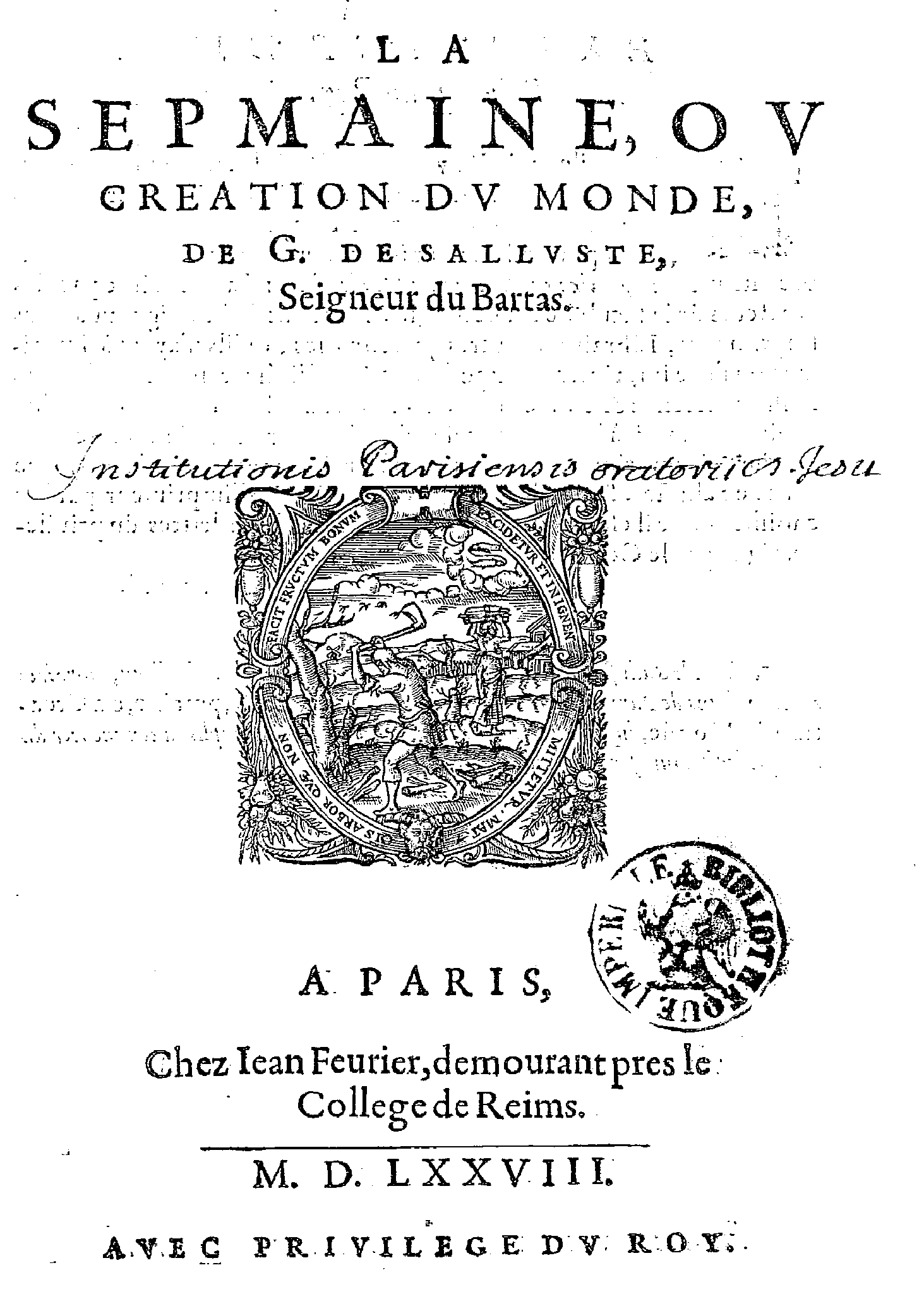
La Sepmaine, ou creation du Monde (1578)

==== La Seconde Semaine ====
Following the success of his First Week, du Bartas embarked upon a sequel that would survey world history from Adam to the apocalypse, following the plan in Augustine's City of God. He only completed four jours, each divided into four parts, that covered the eras of Adam, Noah, Abraham and David (the final three were to cover Zedekiah, the Messiah and the Eternal Sabbath).

The first two jours of La Seconde Semaine were first printed in 1584. 'Le Premier Jour' (the era of Adam) contains 'Eden' (II.i.1) describing the Garden of Paradise; 'L'Imposture' ('The Imposture' in Sylvester's translation, II.i.2) which relates the Fall of Man; 'Les Furies' ('The Furies', II.i.3) which describes the diseases, conflicts and vices that plague mankind; and 'Les Artifices' ('The Handy Crafts', II.i.4) which is about the various crafts that humankind learnt, and Cain and Abel. 'Le Second Jour' (Noah) consists of 'L'Arche' ('The Arke', II.ii.1) retelling the Great Flood; 'Babylone' ('Babylon', II.ii.2) about the Tower of Babel and European literary cultures; 'Les Colonies' ('The Colonies', Ii.ii.3) which describes the spread of different tribes across the world; and 'Les Colomnes' ('The Columnes', II.ii.4) in which the tale (originally found in Josephus) of Seth writing scientific and astronomical knowledge on two pillars to safeguard it against fire and flood is a point of departure for a review of learning in those areas.

Les Suites de la Second Semaine, containing the third and fourth jours, were printed in parts between 1591 and 1603. James VI of Scotland received a manuscript copy containing six of the eight sections of the Suites (including a version of 'Les Peres' with 830 lines not found in the printed texts) in the late 1580s. 'Le Troisieme Jour' continues the narrative into the age of Abraham: La Vocation ('The Vocation', II.iii.1) and 'Les Peres' ('The Fathers', II.iii.2) cover the end of the Book of Genesis in relating the destruction of Sodom and Gomorrah and the sacrifice of Isaac respectively, while 'La Loy' ('The Law', II.iii.3) moves into the Exodus narrative and 'Les Captaines' ('The Captains', II.iii.4) to Joshua and Samuel. 'Le Quatrieme Jour' is devoted to David: 'Les Trophees' ('The Trophies', II.iv.1), 'La Magnificence' ('The Magnificence', II.iv.2) is about Solomon, and the final two completed sections, 'Le Schisme' ('The Schism', II.iv.3) and finally 'La Decadence' ('The Decay', II.iv.4), reviews the monarchs of the Books of Kings and Book of Chronicles.

=== Miscellaneous Poems ===
Besides Le muse chrestienne and the two Semaines, du Bartas wrote a number of occasional poems and lyrics. Among these are two of some length, about battles that occurred in the author's lifetime: 'Cantique d'Yvry' ('Song of Ivry'), on the Battle of Ivry (1590), not long before the poet's death, and 'La Lepanthe' ('Lepanto'), a translation of James VI's poem on the Battle of Lepanto (1571).

== Reputation ==
=== France ===
La Sepmaine was instantly successful in France: there were 42 editions between 1578 and 1632, often printed with Simon Goulart's marginal annotations and commentary. Du Bartas was the most highly esteemed French poet in France at the turn of the seventeenth century, even more so than Ronsard, and in 1620 was still regarded as the apogee of French 'grand poesie'. However, there were no further French editions of the Semaines after 1630. What were once regarded as the stylistic merits of du Bartas' were later deemed to be weaknesses: his use of compound epithets, duplication of initial syllables, frequent inclusion of metaphors and similes and a highly compressed and accumulative style all contributed to a sense that his poetry was over-wrought and over-elaborate.

Nonetheless there were over thirty poems influenced by du Bartas printed in France between 1601 and 1697, including direct continuations or parodies such as Christophe de Gamon's La Sepmaine (1609) and A. D’Argent's Sepmaine (1629), and printed references praising Du Bartas in works written throughout this period. As late as 1684 Madeleine de Scudéry recalled the often-cited anecdote that Ronsard had once remarked that du Bartas had achieved more in a week than he had in his entire life. Du Bartas was, however, an object of criticism: he was, for example, cited for examples of mistakes to avoid in a Brève instruction (1667). Du Bartas' reputation remained low in subsequent centuries: in 1842 Charles Augustin Sainte-Beuve wrote that du Bartas ‘a pu s’égarer et céder au mauvais goût de son temps dans le gros de ces oeuvres’ (‘was led astray and gave into the poor taste of his times in most of his work’).

Though du Bartas is still not widely known in France today, critical re-appraisals in the twentieth century, led by James Dauphiné, Yvonne Bellenger and other, have shown how du Bartas' encyclopedic writing was representative of its time and is still worthy of attention.

=== Scotland ===
James VI of Scotland's enthusiasm for du Bartas made the Frenchman's poetry uniquely popular in sixteenth-century Scotland. James possessed a copy of La Sepmaine given to him by his nurse, and a year later wrote in the preface to his Essayes of a Prentise (Edinburgh, 1584) that

Hauing oft reuolued, and red ouer (fauorable Reader) the booke and Poems of the deuine and Illuster Poete, Salust du Bartas, I was moved by the oft reading & perusing of them, with a restles and lofty desire, to preas to attaine to the like vertue. (Essayes, C3r)

The volume contained James's Scots translation of L'Uranie. Du Bartas' synthesis of sacred and secular verse matched the King's own aesthetic preferences, and also his political imperative to consolidate his divine and political authority. The King shared Urania's sense that more poets should write about the highest matters:

O ye that wolde your browes with Laurel bind,
What larger feild I pray you can you find,
Then is his praise, who brydles heavens most cleare
Makes mountaines tremble, and howest hells to feare?

Thomas Hudson, a court musician, was (so he writes in the preface) commissioned by the King to prepare a translation of Judit, which was printed in 1584 with prefatory sonnets by James and others. Du Bartas was evidently quickly made aware of the King's attention, for a publisher's contract which du Bartas signed in 1585 mentions printing the King's translation (as well as du Bartas’ translation of the King's ‘Ane Schort Poeme of Tyme’).

Du Bartas and James subsequently met in the summer of 1587 when the French poet travelled on a diplomatic mission to Scotland, via the English Court, to propose a marriage match between James and Henry of Navarre’s sister, Catherine de Bourbon. Though the match never happened, du Bartas remained in high esteem with James: he received expensive gifts on departure, and the King invited him to return. It may well have been during this visit that du Bartas translated James’ mini-epic on the Battle of Lepanto which was printed alongside James’ original poem and his translation of ‘Les Furies’ in his Poeticall Exercises at Vacant Houres (1591).

Poets writing at the Jacobean Court (members of the so-called "Castalian Band") all knew of du Bartas, who was ‘aesthetically and ideologically a role-model for James’ and ‘emblematic of the direction, spiritually, philosophically and aesthetically, in which James sought to lead his imagined renaissance’ (Sarah Dunnigan) at the Scottish Court. William Fowler and John Stewart of Baldynneis are two poets who refer to Urania as a symbolic figurehead for the kind of poetic inspiration to which they aspired in vain. Hadrian Damman's Latin translation was dedicated to James when printed in 1600 (a manuscript copy dated 1596 also survives, National Library of Scotland MS Adv. 19.2.10). William Drummond of Hawthornden, William Alexander and Zachary Boyd are three seventeenth-century Scottish poets who knew du Bartas’ works well; the latter two imitate his works (Sylvester's translation in Boyd's case) extensively.

James had a major impact on English responses both before and after his accession to the English throne. Gabriel Harvey is one of numerous writers in London who were reading James' translation in the 1590s: when Harvey praised du Bartas as the ‘Treasurer of Humanity and 'Ieweller of Diuinity’ and ‘a right inspired, and enravished Poet’ in the preface to Pierces Supererogation (1593) and other works, he was in part drawing on notes made in his copy of James's Essayes. A passage in the King's Basilikon Doron exhorting more poets to 'bee well versed' in du Bartas' poetry was cited, for instance, by Thomas Winter in the dedicatory epistle of his translation of the Third Dayes Creation (1604). Joshua Sylvester dedicated his translation Devine Weekes and Workes (1605) to James, having presented a manuscript extract to the King in the previous year.

=== England ===
Du Bartas was extremely popular in early modern England, and was still being read widely in the later seventeenth century even as his reputation in France began to decline. Around two hundred texts printed in England before 1700 make direct reference to du Bartas, including seventy-five from the period 1641–1700. There were numerous translations of sections of the Semaines into English, of which the most significant is Josuah Sylvester's Devine Weekes and Workes (1605 et seq.; re-printed six times by 1641). Du Bartas was quickly regarded as a divine epic poet whose works took their place among the great European classics: Gabriel Harvey, for example, compared du Bartas to Homer, Virgil and Dante.

Sir Philip Sidney apparently admired du Bartas' works later in life, and his translation of 'Salust Du Bartas' was entered into the Stationers’ Register in 1588, but is now unknown. Du Bartas had in effect synthesized the two highest forms of poetry, divine and philosophical, described in Sidney's Apology for Poetry. S. K. Heninger, reflecting on similarities between Sidney and du Bartas’ conception of poetry, writes that: ‘the reader could ponder the wide-ranging mysteries of creation. He could contemplate God’s intention, His methods, His results. The text is characterized by a Protestant passion for the truth—the truth, at once universal and concrete. It is also characterized by a Protestant devotion to the word—the word, at once comprehensive and knowable, logos though it may be.’

William Scott, author of ‘The Model of Poesy’ and a translator of the first two Days of La Sepmaine, found moral, spiritual and aesthetic value in the poetry of 'our incomparable Bartas, who hath opened as much natural science in one week, containing the story of the creation, as all the rabble of schoolmen and philosophers have done since Plato and Aristotle.' Edmund Spenser, said by Harvey to have particularly enjoyed The Fourth Day, writes in The Ruines of Time that after Joachim Du Bellay 'gins Bartas hie to rayse | His heavenly Muse, th'Almighty to adore'; however, ‘within the shared province of Christian epic, Spenser and du Bartas remain fairly far apart’ (Susan Snyder).

According to Snyder, ‘clearly everyone in pre-Restoration England who had received a literary education read the Weekes and almost all [...] admired it.’ Du Bartas was John Milton's ‘earliest English literary model’, and traces of direct influence are arguably most apparent in Poems 1645. Nonetheless the Semaines were a major precursor for Paradise Lost , and can productively be compared with it. Du Bartas was also an early influence on Anne Bradstreet; one of her earliest dated works is her elegy ‘In Honour of Du Bartas. 1641’. The prefatory materials to The Tenth Muse (1650) make numerous references to Bradstreet's enthusiasm for du Bartas, including Nathaniel Ward's condescending remark that Bradstreet is a 'right Du Bartas girle'. Though Bradstreet's poetry owes much to du Bartas' methods, her work is not derivative, and she denied that her poetry imitates du Bartas in her dedicatory poem to her father Thomas Dudley: 'I honour him, but dare not wear his wealth’ (ll. 38–39). Lucy Hutchinson would have read Devine Weekes before writing Order and Disorder.

=== Rest of Europe ===
Du Bartas' works, particularly and often exclusively La Sepmaine, were translated into numerous other European languages in the sixteenth and seventeenth centuries. There were translations into Latin (by Gabriel de Lerm (1583), Jean Édouard Du Monin (1579), Hadrian Damman (1600) and Samuel Benoît (1609)), Italian (by Ferrante Guisone, first printed in 1592 and reprinted five times before 1613), Spanish (Joan Dessi, 1610, and Francisco de Cáceres in 1612) and German (Tobias Hübner, 1622 and 1631). Several Dutch translators produced versions: Zacharias Heyns (1616, 1621 and 1628), Theodorick van Liefvelt, Heer van Opdorp (1609), Wessel van den Boetselaer, Heer van Asperen (1622) and Joost van den Vondel. A Danish translation of La Sepmaine was printed in 1661, and a Swedish translation in 1685.

Du Bartas' popularity apparently declined throughout Europe in the eighteenth century: in his translation of Diderot's 'Rameau's Nephew' (1805) Johann Wolfgang von Goethe expressed surprise that La Sepmaine was no longer widely known.

== References and further reading ==
- The Works of Guillaume de Salluste, Sieur Du Bartas: A Critical Edition with Introduction, Commentary, and Variants, ed. by Urban Tigner Holmes, John Coriden Lyons and Robert White Linker, 3 vols. (Chapel Hill, 1935–40; repr. Geneva: Slatkine Reprints, 1977)
- Bjaï, Denis and François Rouget, eds, Les Oeuvres (1579) (Geneva, 2018)
- The Divine Weeks and Works of Guillaume de Saluste, Sieur du Bartas, trans. by Josuah Sylvester, ed. by Susan Snyder, 2 vols. (Oxford, 1979)
- Ashton, Harry, Du Bartas en Angleterre (Paris, 1908)
- Auger, Peter, Du Bartas' Legacy in England and Scotland (Oxford, 2019)
- Auger, Peter, ‘The Semaines’ Dissemination in England and Scotland until 1641’, Renaissance Studies, 26 (2012), 625-40.
- Auger, Peter, ‘Snapshots of Early Modern English Responses to French Poets’, in online conference proceedings of ‘“Revolutionizing Early Modern Studies”? The Early English Books Online Text Creation Partnership in 2012’ (September 2012)
- Auger, Peter, 'Du Bartas’ Visit to England and Scotland in 1587', Notes and Queries 59 (2012), 505–8 doi:10.1093/notesj/gjs139
- Auger, Peter, 'Le Manuscrit Royal de la Suite de la Seconde Semaine de Du Bartas’, Bibliothèque d’Humanisme et Renaissance 78 (2016), 127-43
- Auger, Peter, British Responses to Du Bartas' Semaines, 1584-1641 (Unpublished DPhil thesis, 2012)
- Banks, Kathryn, Cosmos and Image in the Renaissance: French Love Lyric and Natural-Philosophical Poetry (Oxford, 2008) extracts available on Durham Research Online
- Banks, Kathryn, 'Confessional identity, eating, and reading : Catholic imitations of Du Bartas’s 'Sepmaine', Nottingham French studies, XLIX (2010). 62-78
- Beekman, A., Influence de Du Bartas sur la littérature néerlandaise (Poitiers, 1912)
- Bellenger, Yvonne, La Sepmaine (texte de 1581) (Paris, 1981)
- Bellenger, Yvonne, Du Bartas et ses divines Semaines (Paris, 1993)
- Bellenger, Yvonne, and Jean-Claude Ternaux, Bibliographie des ecrivains français: Du Bartas (Paris, 1998)
- Bellenger, Yvonne, 'État present des études sur Du Bartas en France depuis 1970', Oeuvres et Critiques, 29 (2004), 9-26
- Cummings, Robert, ‘Reading Du Bartas’, in Tudor Translation, ed. by Fred Schurink (Basingstoke, 2011), pp. 175–96
- Dauphiné, James, Guillaume de Saluste Du Bartas: poète scientifique (Paris, 1983)
- Doelman, James, 'The Accession of King James I and English Religious Poetry', SEL: Studies in English Literature 1500–1900, Vol. 34, 1994
- Garapon, Robert, 'Sur la Renommée posthume de Ronsard et de Du Bartas de 1590 à 1640', Oeuvres et critiques, 6 (1981) 53-59
- Gregory, E. R., 'Du Bartas, Sidney, and Spenser', Comparative Literature Studies, 7 (1970), 437-49
- Keller, Luzius, Palingène, Ronsard, Du Bartas: trois études sur la poésie cosmologique de la Renaissance (Bern, 1974)
- Lamb, Charles, 'Observations on Sylvester's Du Bartas, with Specimens', in Olliers Literary Miscellany in Prose and Verse, 1 (1820), pp. 62–79
- Lepage, John Louis Joshua Sylvester's translation of Du Bartas' Les semaines and the development of English poetic diction. (PhD thesis, University of Glasgow. 1982)
- Magnien, Michel, 'Du Bartas en France au XVIIe siècle' in Du Bartas: 1590–1990 (Mont-de-Marsan, 1992), pp. 69–80
- Miernowski, Jan, Dialectique et connaissance dans la Semaine de Du Bartas (Geneva, 1992)
- Norton Anthology of English Literature: Norton Topics Online, Paradise Lost in Context (accessed 11 November 2014)
- Pellissier, Georges, La Vie et Les Oeuvres de Du Bartas (Paris, 1883)
- Prescott, Anne Lake, French Poets and the English Renaissance (New Haven, 1978)
- Prescott, Anne Lake, ‘Du Bartas and Renaissance Britain: An Update’, Oeuvres et Critiques, 29 (2004), 27-38
- Reichenberger, Kurt, Du Bartas und sein Schöpfungsepos (Munich, 1962)
- Reichenberger, Kurt, Die Schöpfungswoche des Du Bartas. 2 vols. (Tübingen, 1963)
- Sinfield, Alan, ‘Sidney and Du Bartas’, Comparative Literature 27 (1975), 8-20.
- Snyder, Susan, 'Sylvester, Josuah (1562/3–1618)', Oxford Dictionary of National Biography
