= Castalian Band =

Grouping of Scottish poets

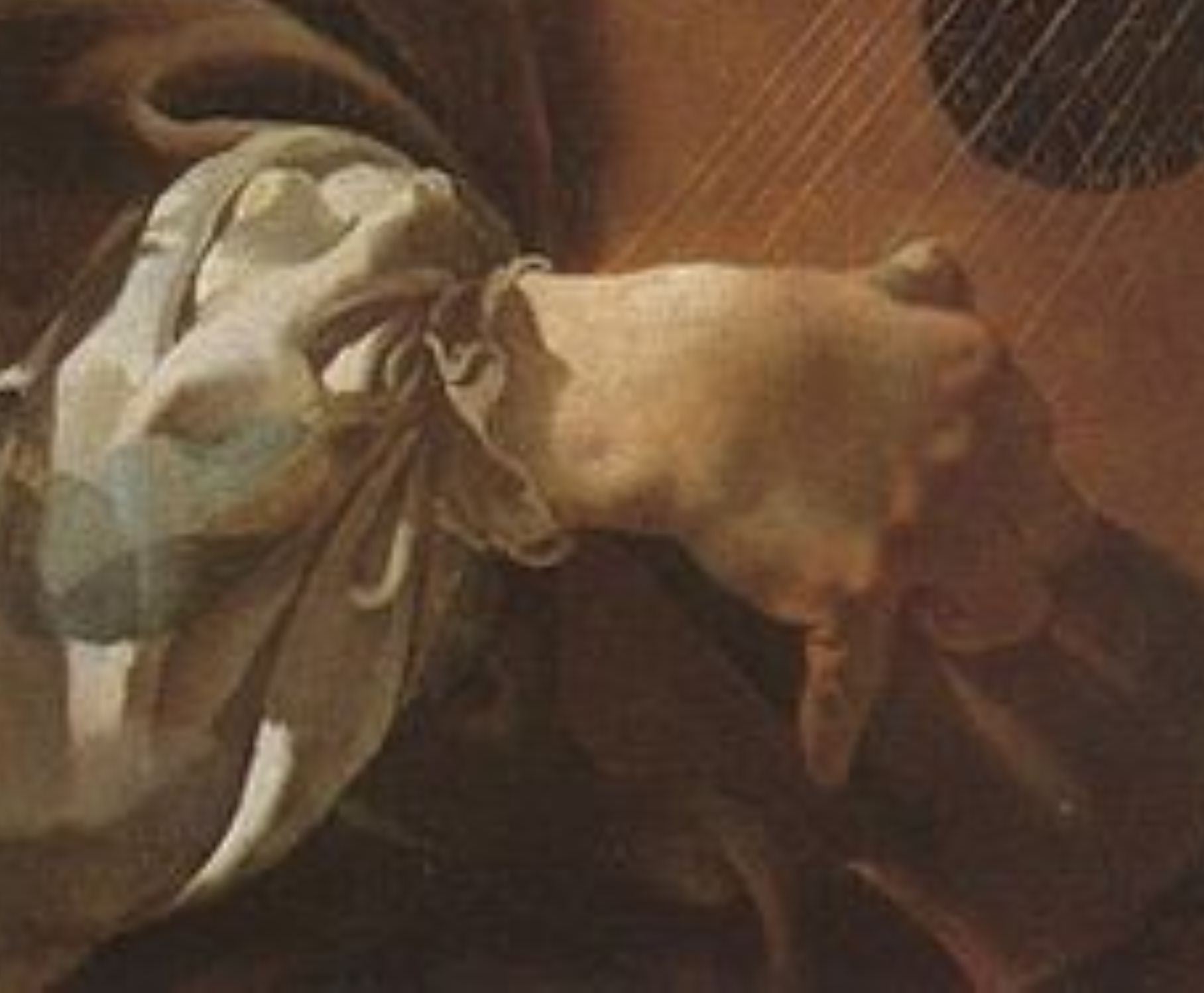

The Castalian Band is a modern name given to a grouping of Scottish Jacobean poets, or makars, which is said to have flourished between the 1580s and early 1590s in the court of James VI and consciously modelled on the French example of the Pléiade. Its name is derived from the classical term Castalian Spring, a symbol for poetic inspiration. The name has often been claimed as that which the King used to refer to the group, as in lines from one of his own poems, an epitaph on his friend Alexander Montgomerie:

Quhat drowsie sleepe doth syle your eyes allace
Ye sacred brethren of Castalian band

— James VI

The notion of the 'Castalian band' in 20th-century scholarship derives in the main from a 1969 book by the Scottish musicologist Helena Mennie Shire. It was Shire and her collaborator Kenneth Elliot – who had produced The Music of Scotland (Cambridge 1964) – who drew particular attention to the verse lines by James, remarking that "It has been well suggested that King James' name for his poets at court, or their name for themselves, was 'the brethren of Castalian band.'" Apart from this verse, no scholar has produced any clear evidence for any such self-aware grouping. Nevertheless, other writers and websites seized on the concept. In a celebrated article from 2001, the literary scholar Priscilla Bawcutt examined the claims closely, and effectively demolished them.

However, the persistence of the idea of the Castalian Band has its own interest – as Bawcutt noted, suggesting that it is grounded in a desire to identify a strong Scottish Renaissance culture. Poetry, and more especially song, had suffered as a result of the Reformation of the Scottish Protestant church concluded in 1560, and it may have seemed desirable to offer a more positive image for the later 16th century.

Whether or not there ever was such a Court grouping as the Castalian Band, it seems likely that there were cultivated circles of educated gentlemen in Scotland at the time. The King wrote a detailed treatise intended to establish a standard of practice in Scots poetry – his Reulis and Cautelis – and there may well have been gatherings of poets at James' court. The activities of some of the poets recognized to be working in Scotland at the time are known to a limited extent.

The principal literary figure to be directly associated with the court was Alexander Montgomerie. Music may also played an important part in performances; some of the poems of Montgomerie and others are known to have been set as song.

== "Brethren" of the Castalian Band ==
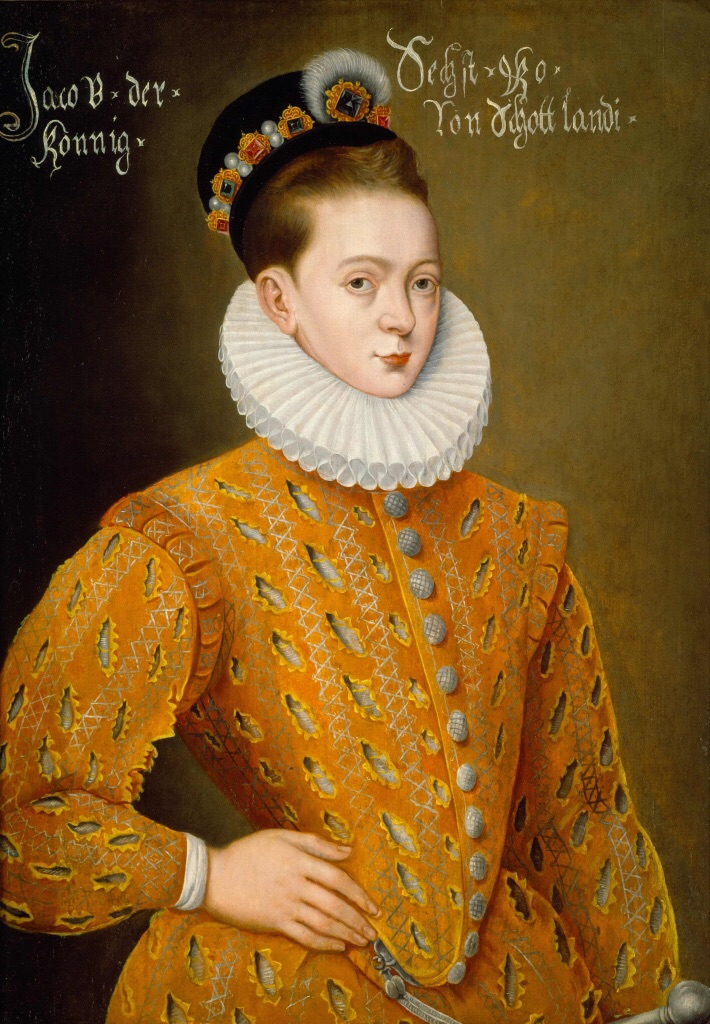
James VI in 1585, aged 19. The "Danish portrait".

The circle of poets with known connections to the Scottish court include:

- King James VI
- Alexander Montgomerie (c. 1544–1598?)
- Patrick Hume of Polwarth (c. 1550–1609)
- Alexander Hume (c. 1557–1609) the younger brother of Patrick Hume
- William Fowler (1560–1612)
- John Stewart of Baldynneis (c. 1567–1605)
- Thomas Hudson (d. 1605)
- Robert Hudson, brother of Thomas

Membership was supposedly fluid and some figures, such as Montgomerie, were already established poets. French influences were particularly important for the King. James himself made translations of work by the Gascon soldier-poet du Bartas, and du Bartas in return translated James's own Lepanto. Du Bartas himself visited the Scottish Court on a diplomatic mission in 1587 during which time James unsuccessfully attempted to persuade him to stay.

Other 'Castalian' makars produced translation as well as original works. William Fowler, whose original poetry includes the sonnet sequence The Tarantula of Love, made translations from Petrarch, while John Stewart produced an abridged translation of Ariosto's Orlando Furioso. Many Scots translations predated first translations of the same works in England.

Chief among the circle was arguably the soldier, courtier and makar Alexander Montgomerie. He had achieved celebrity after victory over Patrick Hume in The Flyting Betwixt Montgomerie and Polwart (c.1583). His many works include public poems such as The Navigatioun, a long allegory called The Cherry and the Slae, some devotional poems, and a large number of personal court lyrics sometimes modelled on poets such as Ronsard. Sonnets on various themes include an autobiographical sequence that deftly charts frustration with "the law's delay". Even when Montgomerie came to be politically excluded from the court sometime in the mid-1590s as a result of his Catholic sympathies, he appears to have retained the affection of the King.

The court also attracted figures from furth of Scotland. The brothers Thomas and Robert Hudson from the North of England, were appointed as by James not only as poets but as court musicians helping to lead the musical "revival" he regarded as going hand-in-hand with his literary programme. Thomas produced translations as well as original work. Under James' patronage he was another translator of du Bartas.

Names on the fringes of court literary circles include:

- William Alexander, Earl of Stirling (1567–1640)
- Robert Aytoun (1569–1638)
- Christian Lindsay

Alexander and Ayton later represented a more anglicised stream of Scottish writing. They came to prominence more properly after the Union of the Crowns. Ayton was one of the first Scottish poets to have written explicitly in English, while Alexander wrote rhymed tragedies in a genre sometimes referred to as closet drama and assisted the King in his metrical translations of the Psalms of David.

== Verse drama ==
Although there is no direct record of Scottish court drama in the late 16th century, one verse play in Scots does intriguingly survive from the period, an eminently performable comedy of love, Philotus, which is known today only from an anonymous edition published in London in 1603. Its well-developed structure and language as theatre may suggest that our picture of literary activity in the Scottish court of James is not complete. The exact identity of the dramatist is open to speculation.

== Context and legacy ==
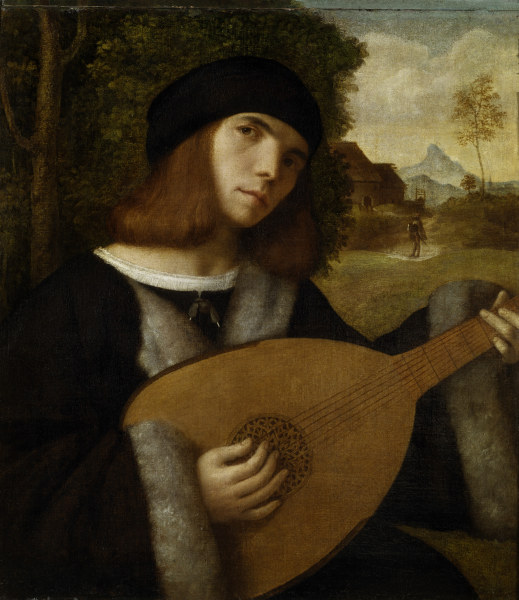
16th-century Lute player. James VI saw music and court poetry as connected art-forms, employing minstrels from France, England and Italy.

Scottish Jacobean writers have largely been overshadowed by the contemporaneous literary scene in London in the age of Shakespeare. Their appreciation also has been coloured by the debatable historical view that their work marked a decline and end to the tradition of the makars. The modernist Scots poet Hugh MacDiarmid, one of their detractors, dismissed their legacy in his terms as royalist and episcopalian and described their work as "circumscribed in outlook".

More recent critics and scholars have attempted to demonstrate the injustice of such prejudicial factors and seek a more favourable appreciation of their work. The full range of their prolific output has never properly been represented in modern publication and much in their writing, situated in a continuous tradition from the period of earlier writers such as Dunbar, prefigures the metaphysical poets in England. Not only are the 'Castalians' of interest in their own right as the last court poets in a purely Scottish context, but at their best, and especially when their language is correctly appraised, their proficient use of sometimes highly mannered verse forms to express complex ideas and personal emotion can stand with later popular works of figures such as Donne, Herrick and Marvell.

== Reulis and Cautelis ==
King James VI's conscious desire to determine continuity in the Scottish literary tradition is evident from his 1585 prose treatise, the Reulis and Cautelis (Rules and Cautions), a treatise on Scots prosody written when he was 19. Casting himself, accurately, as an apprentice in the art of poetry, his intent was to describe the tradition and set general aesthetic and linguistic standards for Scots poetic composition. As he was well aware, his own ancestor, James I, was a principal figure in that tradition. Some of the specific tenets of the royal treatise were not always observed by the Castalians, but its focus on language was a defining aspect for the group. James wrote elsewhere that it "best became a king" to "make famous his own tongue", and the Reulis and Cautelis seems principally designed to serve that aspiration. Yet James at the same time conscious of his increasingly likely future accession to the English throne also gave his publisher, Robert Waldegrave, permission to anglicise his Scots manuscripts when going to press for consumption in England.

== See also ==
- Pléiade
- Metaphysical poets
- Cavalier poets
- Cultural depictions of James I of England
