= Some Reulis and Cautelis to Be Observit and Eschewit in Scottis Poesie =

1584 book by James IV and I

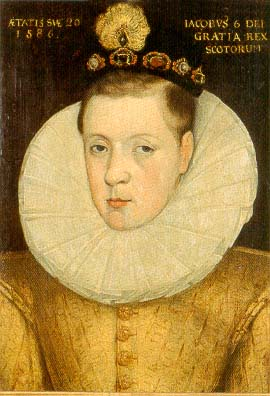
James VI, c.1586

Ane Schort Treatise conteining some Reulis and Cautelis to be observit and eschewit in Scottis poesie (1584) is the full title of a work of non-fiction prose in Scots, also called The Essayes of a Prentise in the Divine Art of Poesie, written by the 19-year-old James VI of Scotland (later also James I of England) and first published in Edinburgh. Its original purpose was to describe and propose the ideal standard for poets writing in the Scottish tradition, a tradition which includes James' direct ancestor, James I (1394–1437).

James VI, as a young poet-king, was both the head and patron of the Castalian Band, a fairly loose circle of court poets which he both established and composed with as peers in the 1580s and early 1590s. It is certain that the treatise was intended to set the aesthetic standard for the writing he wished to advocate. The Castalian poets included Alexander Montgomerie, William Fowler, William Alexander, John Stewart and Alexander Hume, and others variously. James' patronage as Scottish king also attracted poets from Northern England, such as Thomas Hudson.

Like most of James' writing, Reulis and Cautelis (Rules and Cautions) was written in his first language, Middle Scots. Because of its subject, it was one of the few manuscripts by the King that was not anglicised by his London publisher Thomas Waldegrave for publication in England.

== Notes and references ==
- Cairns Craig, general editor (1988). The History of Scottish Literature, Volume I, Origins to 1660. Aberdeen University Press. ISBN 0-08-037725-4
