= George Melford =

American actor and director (1877–1961)

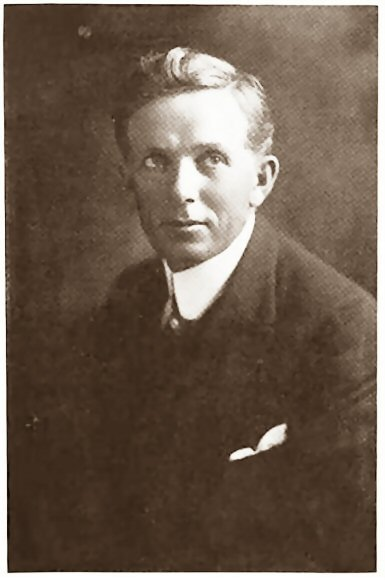
- Who's Who in the Film World, 1914
- Born: George Henry Knauff; February 19, 1877; Rochester, New York, U.S.
- Died: April 25, 1961 (aged 84); Hollywood, California, U.S.
- Other name: G.W. Melford
- Occupations: Actor, director, screenwriter, producer
- Years active: 1909–1960
- Spouse(s): Louise Marsland (1904–1924); Diana Miller

George H. Melford (born George Henry Knauff, February 19, 1877 – April 25, 1961) was an American stage and film actor and director. Often taken for granted as a director today, the stalwart Melford's name by the 1920s was, like Cecil B. DeMille's, appearing in big bold letters above the title of his films.

== Early years ==
Born in Rochester, New York, in 1877 (though older sources state 1888), he was the son of German immigrant Henrietta Knauff. Melford had four sisters: Mary Knauff (Mrs. Godfrey Willis Wainwright); Henrietta Knauff; Alice Irene Knauff (Mrs. Edmond Francois Bernoudy) — all of Los Angeles — and Mrs. Frederick Kells/Keils of Ottawa, Canada. Melford graduated from McGill University in Montreal, Quebec, Canada.

== Career ==
He was an accomplished stage actor working in Cincinnati, Ohio, before joining the Kalem Company motion picture studio in New York City in 1909. Hired by director Sidney Olcott for character actor roles, in the fall of 1910 he was sent to work with a film crew on the West Coast. In 1911, with Robert Vignola, he co-directed Ruth Roland in his first short film, Arizona Bill based on a script he had written. From there, Melford went on to direct another 30 films for Kalem Studios until 1915, when he was hired by Jesse L. Lasky to direct feature-length films for Lasky's Feature Play Company. That same year, Melford became one of the founding members of the Motion Picture Directors Association.

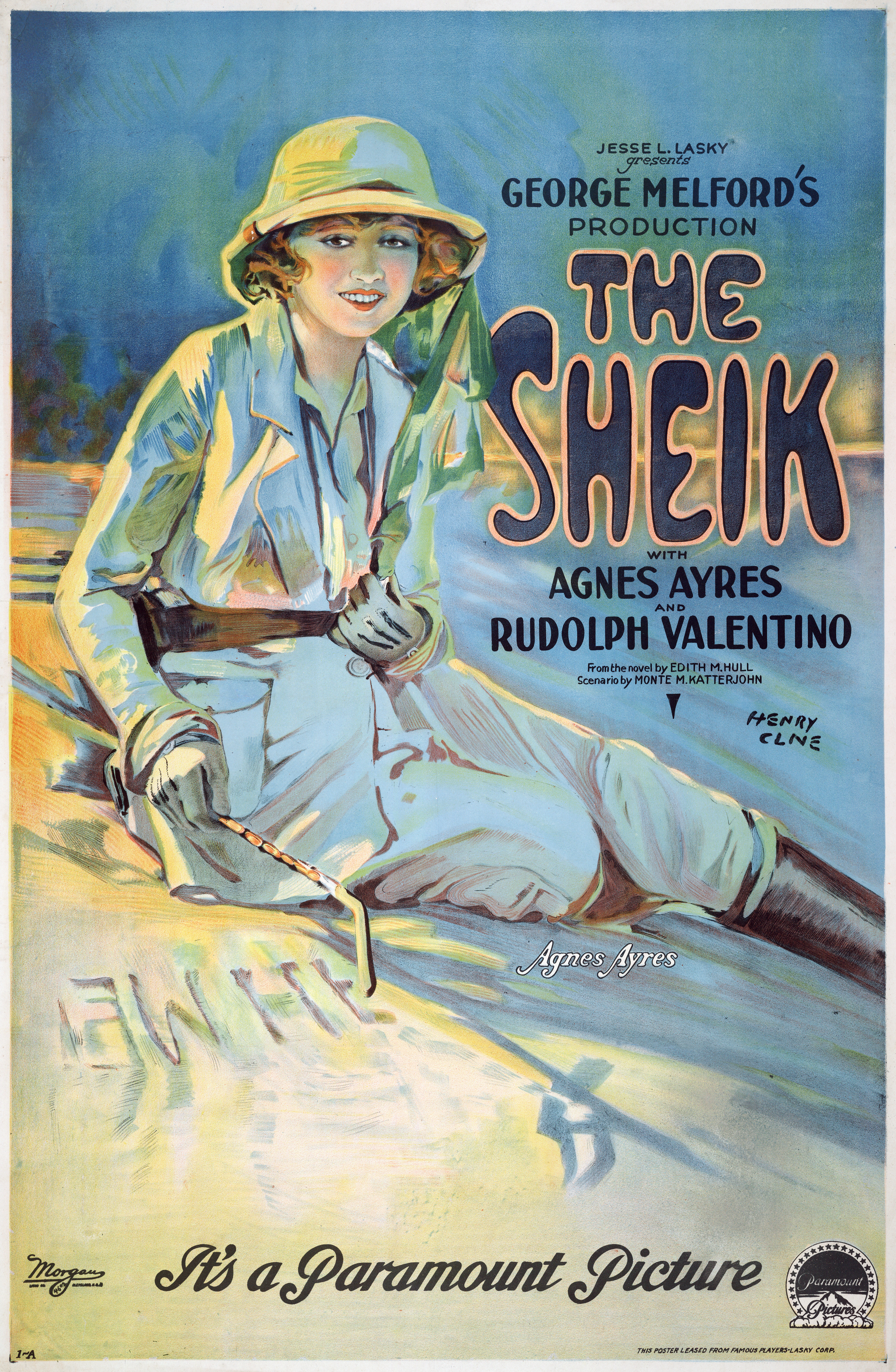
Poster for The Sheik (1921), directed by George Melford

In 1916 Melford directed To Have and to Hold, a film based on the Mary Johnston novel that had been the bestselling novel in the United States for 1900. In 1921 he directed what is probably his most famous silent film—The Sheik, starring Rudolph Valentino.

Melford remained with Lasky's company for ten years, then joined Universal Pictures, where he directed his first talkie in 1929. The following year, he co-directed four Spanish-language films including the acclaimed Spanish version of Dracula. Melford filmed it simultaneously with the English version on the same sets at night using a different cast and crew. Actress Lupita Tovar—who was in the film—said in an interview on the 75th anniversary DVD of the film that Melford did not speak Spanish and had to use a translator.

His last major work as a director came in 1937 when he and Harry L. Fraser co-directed Columbia Pictures' first serial, a 15-episode, five-hour-long adventure film titled Jungle Menace starring Frank Buck.

== Later career and death ==
Melford loved the film business, and although financially independent, he never stopped working. Having directed more than 140 films, he continued to work in small character roles. In the 1940s he was part of Preston Sturges' unofficial "stock company" of character actors, appearing in six films written and directed by Sturges. (Note: Melford appeared in The Great McGinty, The Lady Eve, The Miracle of Morgan's Creek, Hail the Conquering Hero, Unfaithfully Yours, The Beautiful Blonde from Bashful Bend, Sturges' last American film. Earlier, Melford had also appeared in Remember the Night, which Sturges wrote.) He also made a notable appearance in the 1956 epic The Ten Commandments.

He appeared in his last film in 1960 at the age of 83, dying in Hollywood on April 25, 1961, of heart failure at age 84. He is interred in Valhalla Memorial Park Cemetery in North Hollywood, Los Angeles, California.

== Personal life ==
On May 9, 1904, Melford married Louise Leroy. She filed for divorce on September 28, 1923, asserting that he deserted her on September 15, 1922. The divorce was granted on January 10, 1924. He also was married to actress Diana Miller.

== Select filmography ==
=== Actor ===
- The Wayward Daughter (1909)
- A Colonial Belle (1910, Short)
- The Touch of a Child's Hand (1910, Short) – Mr. Livingston – a Widower
- When Two Hearts Are Won (1911, Short)
- The Bugler of Battery B (1912)
- Perils of the Sea (1913, Short) – Second Officer Bradford
- The Barrier of Ignorance (1914, Short) – Calvin Freeman – a Young Surgeon
- Ambush (1939) – Bank President Wales
- The Family Next Door (1939) – Bank Manager (uncredited)
- The Lady's from Kentucky (1939) – Veterinarian (uncredited)
- Unmarried (1939) – Trainer (uncredited)
- 6,000 Enemies (1939) – Bailiff (uncredited)
- Frontier Marshal (1939) – (uncredited)
- Island of Lost Men (1939) – Merchant (uncredited)
- Heaven with a Barbed Wire Fence (1939) – Hobo (uncredited)
- Rulers of the Sea (1939) – Landlord (uncredited)
- Too Busy to Work (1939) – Dugan
- The Light That Failed (1939) – Second Man (voice, uncredited)
- Remember the Night (1940) – Brian – the Bailiff (uncredited)
- The Man Who Wouldn't Talk (1940) – Juror (uncredited)
- My Little Chickadee (1940) – Greasewood Sheriff-Elect on Train (uncredited)
- Buck Benny Rides Again (1940) – Bartender (uncredited)
- Safari (1940) – Trader
- The Great McGinty (1940) – Senior Senator (uncredited)
- Brigham Young (1940) – John Taylor
- Life with Henry (1940) – Minor Role (uncredited)
- Tall, Dark and Handsome (1941) – Ex-Governor John Logan (uncredited)
- Virginia (1941) – Guest (uncredited)
- Golden Hoofs (1941) – Eldridge (uncredited)
- The Lady Eve (1941) – Party Guest (uncredited)
- Meet John Doe (1941) – Chamber of Commerce Member (uncredited)
- Robbers of the Range (1941) – Colonel Lodge
- Wild Geese Calling (1941) – Foreman (uncredited)
- Belle Starr (1941) – Preacher (uncredited)
- Flying Cadets (1941) – Train Conductor
- Pacific Blackout (1941) – Banker in Park (uncredited)
- Blue, White and Perfect (1942) – Ship's Doctor (uncredited)
- Valley of the Sun (1942) – Dr. Thomas (uncredited)
- Reap the Wild Wind (1942) – Devereaux Banker (uncredited)
- The Lone Star Ranger (1942) – Hardin
- My Gal Sal (1942) – Conductor (uncredited)
- Army Surgeon (1942) – Doctor (uncredited)
- The Navy Comes Through (1942) – Chief Engineer (uncredited)
- That Other Woman (1942) – Zineschwich
- Quiet Please, Murder (1942) – Guard in Library (uncredited)
- Time to Kill (1942) – Minor Role (uncredited)
- Dixie Dugan (1943) – Mr. Sloan
- Gangway for Tomorrow (1943) – Judge (uncredited)
- Government Girl (1943) – Irate Man (uncredited)
- The Dancing Masters (1943) – Gateman (uncredited)
- The Miracle of Morgan's Creek (1943) – U.S. Marshal (uncredited)
- The Great Moment (1944) – Dr. Hayden (uncredited)
- Hail the Conquering Hero (1944) – Sheriff (uncredited)
- The Big Noise (1944) – Mugridge the Butler (uncredited)
- Practically Yours (1944) – Senate Vice-president (uncredited)
- A Tree Grows in Brooklyn (1945) – Mr. Spencer (uncredited)
- Circumstantial Evidence (1945) – Prison Board Member (uncredited)
- Diamond Horseshoe (1945) – Pop – Stage Doorman (uncredited)
- Doll Face (1945) – Stage Doorman (uncredited)
- Johnny Comes Flying Home (1946) – Bit Role (uncredited)
- The Bride Wore Boots (1946) – Judge #3 (uncredited)
- Strange Triangle (1946) – Judge
- Two Years Before the Mast (1946) – Ship Owner (uncredited)
- The Shocking Miss Pilgrim (1947) – Minor Role (uncredited)
- California (1947) – Delegate (uncredited)
- Thunder in the Valley (1947) – Judge (uncredited)
- Call Northside 777 (1948) – Parole Board Member (uncredited)
- The Walls of Jericho (1948) – Minor Role (uncredited)
- The Luck of the Irish (1948) – Nightclub Doorman (uncredited)
- Cry of the City (1948) – Barber (uncredited)
- Unfaithfully Yours (1948) – Concert Attendee (uncredited)
- When My Baby Smiles at Me (1948) – Conductor (uncredited)
- Command Decision (1948) – Correspondent (uncredited)
- The Stratton Story (1949) – Person in Theatre (uncredited)
- The Beautiful Blonde from Bashful Bend (1949) – Deputy (uncredited)
- Sand (1949) – Conductor (uncredited)
- A Ticket to Tomahawk (1950) – Stationmaster (uncredited)
- The Brigand (1952) – Majordomo (uncredited)
- Cripple Creek (1952) – McKee (uncredited)
- Carrie (1952) – Patron at Slawson's (uncredited)
- The President's Lady (1953) – Minister (uncredited)
- A Blueprint for Murder (1953) – Bailiff (uncredited)
- City of Bad Men (1953) – Old-Timer Outside Saloon (uncredited)
- The Robe (1953) – (uncredited)
- The Egyptian (1953) – Priest (uncredited)
- Woman's World (1954) – Auto Plant Worker (uncredited)
- There's No Business Like Show Business (1954) – Kelly (uncredited)
- Prince of Players (1955) – Stage Doorman (uncredited)
- The Ten Commandments (1956) – Hebrew at Golden Calf / Nobleman
- Bluebeard's Ten Honeymoons (1960)

=== Director ===
- Arizona Bill (1911)
- The Mexican Joan of Arc (1911)
- The Soldier Brothers of Susanna (1912)
- The Battle of Bloody Ford (1913)
- The Boer War (1914)
- The Potter and the Clay (1914)
- Young Romance (1915)
- The Immigrant (1915)
- The Unknown (1915)
- To Have and to Hold (1916)
- The House with the Golden Windows (1916)
- The Evil Eye (1917)
- The Crystal Gazer (1917)
- The Sunset Trail (1917)
- Nan of Music Mountain (1917)
- Sandy (1918)
- Wild Youth (1918)
- A Sporting Chance (1919)
- Told in the Hills (1919)
- The Sea Wolf (1920)
- The Round-Up (1920)
- Behold My Wife! (1920)
- The Jucklins (1921)
- A Wise Fool (1921)
- The Sheik (1921)
- Moran of the Lady Letty (1922)
- Burning Sands (1922)
- Ebb Tide (1922)
- Java Head (1923)
- You Can't Fool Your Wife (1923)
- The Light That Failed (1923)
- Big Timber (1924)
- The Dawn of a Tomorrow (1924)
- Simon the Jester (1925)
- Friendly Enemies (1925)
- Without Mercy (1925)
- The Flame of the Yukon (1926)
- Going Crooked (1926)
- A Man's Past (1927)
- Freedom of the Press (1928)
- Sinners in Love (1928)
- Lingerie (1928)
- Love in the Desert (1929)
- Sea Fury (1929)
- The Woman I Love (1929)
- The Poor Millionaire (1930)
- La Voluntad del muerto (1930) Spanish-language version of The Cat and the Canary and The Cat Creeps
- Drácula (1931) Spanish-language version of Dracula
- The Viking (1931)
- East of Borneo (1931)
- The Homicide Squad (1931)
- The Penal Code (1932)
- A Scarlet Week-End (1932)
- The Boiling Point (1932)
- Hired Wife (1934)
- Jungle Menace (serial) (1937)
- Jungle Terror (1946) 70-minute feature film version of serial Jungle Menace

=== Producer ===
- Behold My Wife (1920)
- Moran of the Lady Letty (1922)
- East of Borneo (1931)

=== Writer ===
- Arizona Bill (1911)
- Prisoners of War (1913)
- The Wartime Siren (Scenario, 1913)
- The Fire-Fighting Zouaves (Scenario, 1913)
- Big Timber (1924)
- Sea Fury (1929)
- Jungle Menace (Story, 1937)
