= Linden Row =

Historic house in Virginia, United States

- U.S. National Register of Historic Places
- Virginia Landmarks Register
- Richmond City Historic District
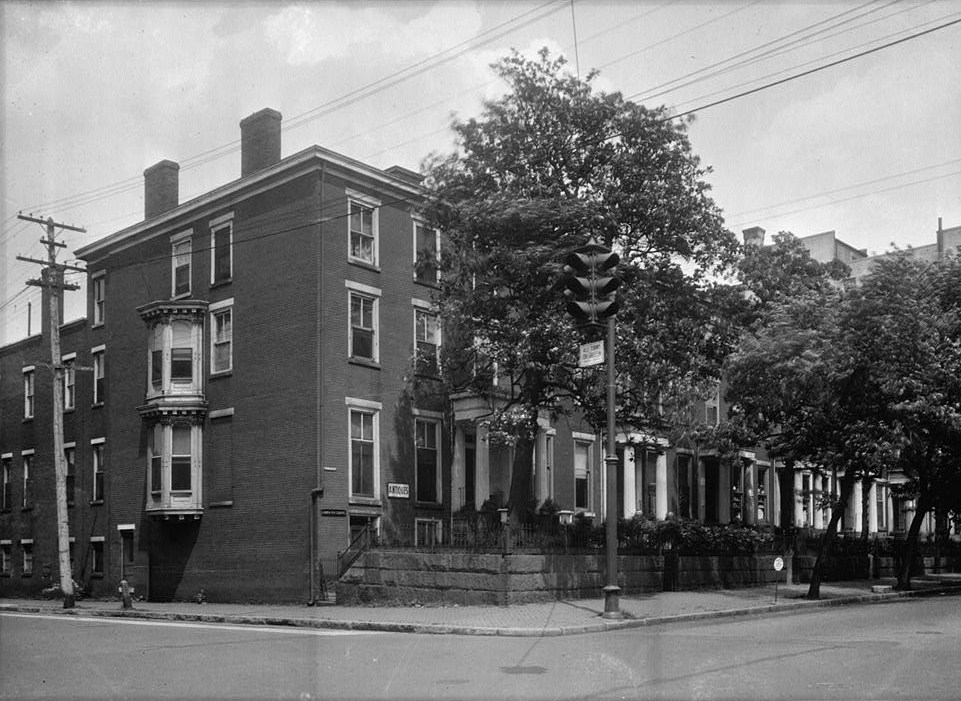
- Linden Row, HABS photo

- Location within Virginia Location within the United States
- Location: 100-114 E. Franklin St., Richmond, Virginia
- Coordinates: 37°32′36″N 77°26′33″W
- Area: 9.9 acres (4.0 ha)
- Built: 1847, 1853
- Architectural style: Greek Revival
- NRHP reference No.: 71001061
- VLR No.: 127-0022

Significant dates
- Added to NRHP: November 23, 1971
- Designated VLR: July 6, 1971

Linden Row is a set of seven historic rowhouses located in Richmond, Virginia. They were built in 1847 and 1853, and are three-story, Greek Revival style brick veneer townhouses on high basements and topped by a simple white cornice of wood. Each house has an identical Grecian Doric order entrance porch supported by two fluted Doric columns. A three-story porch runs the entire length of the back of the houses. Linden Row includes a house owned by noted author Mary Johnston, who died there in 1936.

It was listed on the National Register of Historic Places in 1971.
