= To Have and to Hold (Johnston novel) =

1899 novel by Mary Johnston

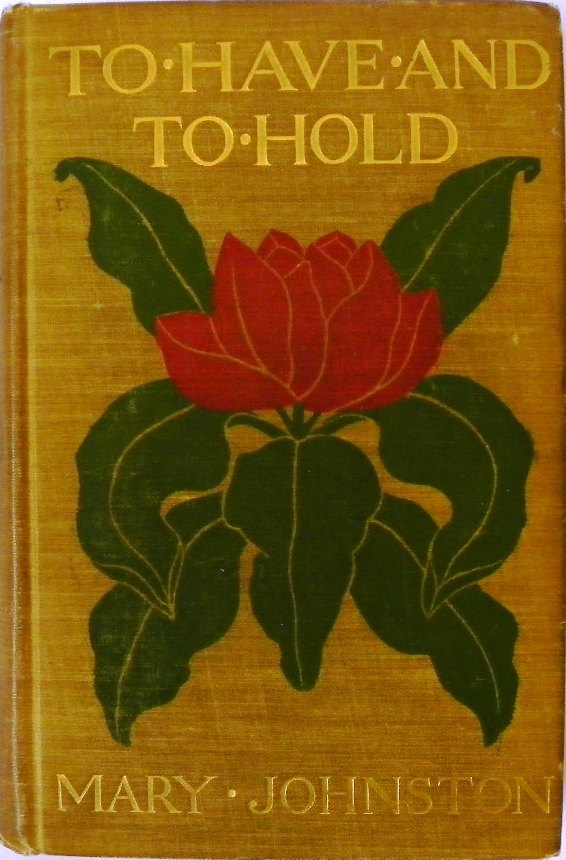
- First edition
- Author: Mary Johnston
- Language: English
- Genre: Novel
- Publisher: Houghton Mifflin
- Publication date: 1899
- Publication place: United States
- Media type: Print (hardback)
- OCLC: 850922

To Have and to Hold (1899) is a novel by American author Mary Johnston. Published by Houghton Mifflin, it was the bestselling novel in the United States in 1900.

== Plot summary ==
To Have and to Hold is the story of an English soldier, Ralph Percy, turned Virginian explorer in colonial Jamestown. Ralph buys a wife for himself—a girl named Jocelyn Leigh—little knowing that she is the escaping ward of King James I, fleeing a forced marriage to Lord Carnal. Jocelyn hardly loves Ralph, and, indeed, she seems to abhor him. Carnal, Jocelyn's husband-to-be, eventually comes to Jamestown, unaware that Ralph Percy and Jocelyn Leigh are husband and wife.

Lord Carnal attempts to kidnap Jocelyn several times and eventually follows Ralph, Jocelyn, and their two companions—Jeremy Sparrow, the Separatist minister, and Diccon, Ralph's servant—as they escape from the King's orders to arrest Ralph and carry Jocelyn back to England. The boat they are in, however, crashes on a desert island, but they are accosted by pirates, who, after a short struggle, agree to take Ralph as their captain after he pretends to be the pirate "Kirby". The pirates gleefully play on with Ralph's masquerade until he refuses to allow them to rape and pillage those aboard Spanish ships.

The flag is up when the pirates see an English ship off the coast of Florida. Ralph refuses to fire upon it, knowing it carries the new Virginian governor, Sir Francis Wyatt, but the pirates open fire, and Jeremy Sparrow, before the English ship can be destroyed, purposefully crashes the ship into a reef. The pirates are all killed, but the English men and women are rescued by the Governor's ship.

Aboard the ship, Ralph is tried for piracy after Lord Carnal tells the Governor that he ordered the destruction of the ship, but Jocelyn, having come to love Ralph, speaks for him. Her words are so persuasive that the Governor believes her and frees Ralph. They return to Virginia, though Ralph is forced to remain in a jail per the King's orders.

Ralph is lured into a trap, though, by Lord Carnal and is subsequently captured by Indians, but not before putting up a fight and seeing Lord Carnal terribly wounded. The brother of Pocahontas, the Indian Nantauquas, rescues him and Diccon, but only to inform them that all the Virginian Indians plan to massacre the Jamestown settlers. As they are on their way back to Jamestown, Diccon is shot and killed by a hostile Indian, and Ralph is left alone to brave his way back. Returning to the colony, he gives his information, only to be told that Jocelyn had made her way to the forest in search of him after his absence was noticed, with Jeremy Sparrow, and that they had not been found. It is also discovered that Lord Carnal has taken poison and will die within a week.

Jamestown is saved, thanks to Ralph's almost-too-late warning, and after things are stabilized, Ralph goes in search of Jocelyn and the minister. After a long and seemingly fruitless search, Nantauquas himself, though he had turned traitor, leads Ralph to where Jocelyn is staying. The two are reunited, and at the end of the story intend to go to England, where Jocelyn's lands have been restored to her and they can finally live in peace.

== Publication history ==
The novel was originally serialized in Atlantic Monthly. The first edition of the novel was published in Cambridge by Houghton, Mifflin, and Company. In the original publication of the novel, there were black and white plates on glossy paper throughout the text. By September 15 of that year, advertisements for the book claimed 250,000 books sold. Publishers Weekly declared the book the #1 bestselling book in April and June of that year, and the #2 bestselling book in July. The novel was later translated into Portuguese (1911), Arabic (1966), and German (1958). The following were the print editions of the novel:

- Boston, Houghton (1899)

- Reprinted in 1901 with no significant changes
- Reprinted in 1902 with a dust jacket
- Reprinted in 1931 with personal notes about the author and illustrator Frank E. Schoonover at 331p.

- Printed in the Riverside Literature Series (1934) with introduction notes and suggestions by Grace Shoup.

- Reprinted in 1959 331p. Personal author and illustrator Frank E. Schoonover
- Reprinted in 1959 at 372p.

- American Printing House for the Blind (1970) in braille
- Classic Books reprints the novel as part of the Best Sellers of 1900 Series in paperback (2001)
- University of North Carolina at Chapel Hill (1997) prints an Electronic Edition

== Adaptations ==
The book has been twice adapted to the screen. The first version was a silent film released in 1916 by Jesse L. Lasky’s Famous Players–Lasky company, was directed by George Melford and starred Wallace Reid and Mae Murray. The second version was released in 1922, also by Lasky, and starring Bert Lytell and Betty Compson. A third screen adaptation was released in 2014.
