= Robert Brook =

London goldsmith

Robert Brook (floruit 1590-1600) was a London goldsmith.

Brook worked in London's Lombard Street.

In 1594 he lent money to Bartholomew Gilbert and Robert Howe, who had a large diamond for sale. He raised the money to redeem the diamond for himself from Giles Simpson, a goldsmith and pawnbroker at the Sign of the White Bear in Lombard Street. Gilbert was questioned by Sir Richard Martin about the origin of the diamond and insisted he obtained it from a sailor at Limehouse, introduced to him by John Maddox from Ipswich. He made the deal in the house of John Terry, a Cheapside jeweler. William Hamour said that Brook had given him the diamond for safe-keeping and his wife Alice had lost it. Alice said she no knowledge of the diamond.

In 1596 the sailor Nicholas Saunders wrote twice to Sir Robert Cecil describing a remarkable hat from the Americas which had been bought from Robert Brook by John Battersby of Plymouth, a former pedlar. The hat was woven with silver and pearl, but was now old and worn. At first sight Saunders had mistakenly thought it was a hat obtained by Sir Francis Drake from an "Indian king or viceroy" that a Captain Morris had described to him.

Brook had dealings with Scottish merchants and diplomats, especially those who came to London to collect an annual subsidy or annuity given by Queen Elizabeth to James VI. In May 1598, James Hudson wrote that the Scottish goldsmith Thomas Foulis had pawned a gold lion set with a ruby worth £400 with Robert Brook, which Hudson suggested belonged to James VI. Foulis's business partner Robert Jousie was unable to pay Brook's interest or other sums due by Hudson, and money they jointly owed to Hudson.

The Earl of Lincoln pawned his best jewellery with Brook, and in October 1598 forfeited his "rarest chains and jewells".

Robert's children, Robert, Thomas, Dorothy, and John, were baptised at St Mary Woolnoth.
