= Thomas Hudson (poet) =

Thomas Hudson (died in or before 1605) was a musician and poet from the north of England present at the Scottish court of King James VI at the end of the 16th century. Both he and his brother Robert Hudson were members of the Castalian Band, a group of court poets and musicians headed by the King in the 1580s and 1590s. William Hudson taught King James to dance, and another brother, James Hudson, became involved in diplomacy between England and Scotland.

== Viola players ==
The Hudson brothers came to Scotland in the retinue of Lord Darnley, and seem to have been connected with Anthony Standen, an English servant of Darnley. Two months after Mary married Darnley, five belts and five pairs of garters of red taffeta were bought for the brothers. They were paid a fee or wages as "sangsteris", singing men.

The brothers joined the household of the infant James VI of Scotland at Stirling Castle as viola players and were listed in the household on 10 March 1568 as "Mekill [Big] Thomas Hudson, Robert Hudson, James Hudson, William Hudson", with their servant William Fowlartoun. The four Hudson brothers were given £50 yearly for their livery clothes, and were allocated a table of their own for their dinners in royal household.

An inventory of Stirling Castle made in 1584 mentions a "violer's chamber beside the great hall", used as the musicians lodging when the court was at the castle. Thomas Hudson also played the lute for the king, and lute strings were bought for him in January 1580. As the brothers were employed by the successive Regents of Scotland, it can be presumed that their sympathies lay with the Protestantism rather than Catholic and French interests.

== Dance and masques at court ==
A "dancing house" at Holyrood Palace was roofed in September 1579. William Hudson was paid to teach the king to dance in 1580 and was called the "master balladin". The dancing lessons can be associated with new French cultural influences at the Scottish court on the arrival of Esmé Stewart. The King's mother, Mary, Queen of Scots, had been taught dancing by a balladin, Jehan Paulle or Giovan Paulo, in France in 1551. William Hudson received a New Year's Day gift of £200 Scots in January 1584.

The "violeris" were bought costumes in December 1579 for a court masque, apparently the Navigatioun written by Alexander Montgomerie. It involved the torchlit entrance at Holyrood Palace of a narrator and his companions, a "Turk, the More, and the Egyptien". The musicians were bought "mask claithis" comprising red and yellow taffeta, silver tock, and swords and daggers. Montgomerie's prologue alludes to the Magi and Epiphany to flatter James VI as the Northern Star. James was also characterised as Solomon. The masque was followed by dancing.

Thomas Hudson was involved in the king's performance in these masques both as a choreographer and costumer. In February 1582, he supplied James with "necessar apparell" for a "mask danss". No surviving music is certainly attributed to the brothers, but old Scottish collections include two pieces Huchison's pavan and Huchison's galliard which may be the work of the brothers known by a variant spelling of their surname. A part song for four voices Nou let us sing has been associated with the brothers and the 1579 Entry of James VI into Edinburgh.

== Judith ==
In 1584 Thomas Hudson translated Judith by Guillaume de Salluste Du Bartas, an account of the biblical character written at the command of Jeanne III of Navarre. The work was printed by Thomas Vautrollier. Hudson described the king's dinner table conversation with his "domesticks" about Du Bartas and the translation of his works in his preface.

== James Hudson ==
After Mary, Queen of Scots, was imprisoned at Lochleven Castle, James Hudson and one of his brothers, described as "sangstaris" (songsters), received a part payment of £120 Scots from Regent Moray.

James Hudson became involved in diplomacy after working for the Master of Gray. He was given a silver basin in 1589 or 1590, and 20 gold angel coins when he was in London. Clothes were bought for his three brothers to perform at the coronation of Anne of Denmark in May 1590. In 1590, letters to James Hudson from Edinburgh were directed to the Sign of the Rose and Talbot (or Tabard) in Gracechurch Street, in the parish of St Benet's.

Hudson wrote many letters to George Nicholson the English diplomat in Edinburgh. James VI wrote to Hudson to secure barrels of London beer for Anne of Denmark. When the Scottish ambassador John Skene returned to London from Denmark in November 1590, he asked Hudson to tell William Cecil of his arrival and request his passport.

Around the year 1591, when the expenses of the royal household were in crisis, Hudson wrote "while I was there, both the king's table and queen's had like to have been unserved by want, the Queen (Anne of Denmark) her house and train are more costly to him than his own" and the king "hath nothing certain that he accounteth to come into his purse, but what he had from her Majesty (Elizabeth I)". Hudson was involved in the payment of an English subsidy to James VI. In October 1594 he carried letters to William Cecil and Robert Cecil from the Scottish diplomat Richard Cockburn who came to receive the money, and he himself received £200 sterling (worth £2000 Scots) in 1595. Hudson regularly paid some of the money to a Scottish textile merchant Robert Jousie who bought textiles for the Scottish royal wardrobe from Baptist Hicks.

James Hudson wrote to Anthony Bacon sharing diplomatic correspondence for the benefit of the Earl of Essex. Hudson wrote to Bacon in December 1595 and August 1596 to obtain portraits of the Earl of Essex and his sister, Lady Rich. In May 1598, Hudson wrote that the Scottish financier Thomas Foulis had pawned a gold lion set with a ruby worth £400 with the London goldsmith Robert Brook of Lombard Street. Hudson suggested this jewel belonged to James VI. Foulis' business partner Robert Jousie was unable to pay Brook's interest or other sums due to be paid by Hudson, and Hudson considered having Jousie arrested for debt in London.

In October 1600, James Hudson arrived in Edinburgh with a chest of drinking glasses for Anne of Denmark, but they were all broken. In December 1600, while travelling through Durham, Hudson sent a little book with the heraldry and mottoes of the nobility of Scotland to Sir Robert Cecil, with a book of anagrams by Walter Quin. He was said to have advised James on his relations with Elizabeth, saying "Old ladies must not be displeased for small matters". After the Union of the Crowns, Hudson and Scottish courtiers were admitted as members of Gray's Inn on 22 May 1603.

James Hudson had some correspondence with Arbella Stewart who wanted to help a poor man named Richard Lassye. Hudson wrote to the Earl of Mar in September 1616 that he had met Sergeant Bowie at the Royal Exchange, who had news of earl's sons on their Grand Tour in France. He requested payment of pension in 1617.
