= To Have and to Hold (1916 film) =

1916 film by George Melford

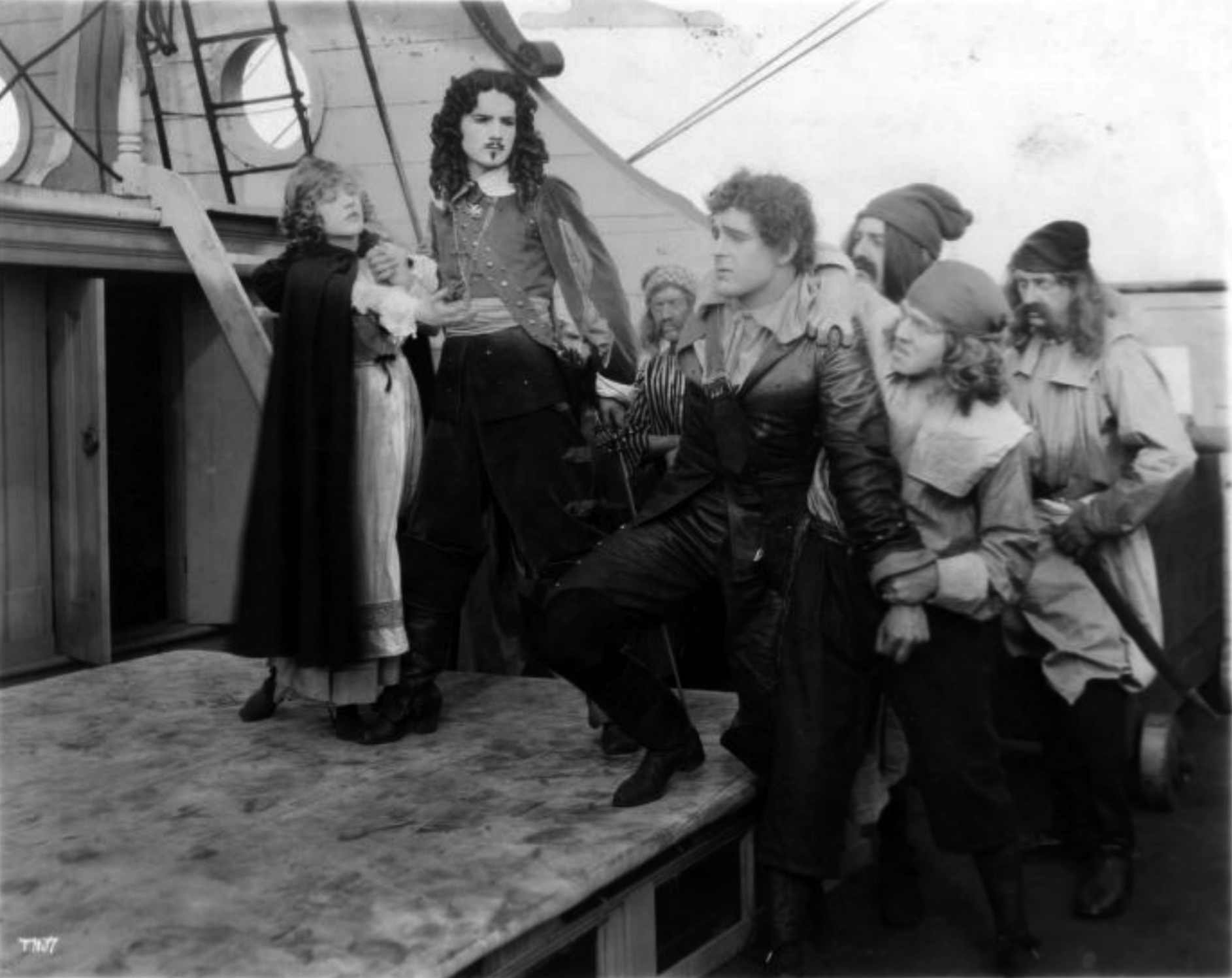
- Scene from the film
- Directed by: George Melford
- Screenplay by: Margaret Turnbull
- Based on: To Have and to Hold by Mary Johnston
- Produced by: Jesse Lasky
- Starring: Mae Murray; Wallace Reid
- Cinematography: Percy Hilburn (French)
- Distributed by: Famous Players–Lasky Corporation; Paramount Pictures
- Release date: March 5, 1916 (United States)
- Running time: 50 minutes
- Country: United States
- Languages: Silent; English intertitles

To Have and to Hold is a lost 1916 American silent adventure/drama film directed by George Melford. Based on the 1899 novel of the same name, the film starred Wallace Reid and Mae Murray in her film debut.

The film is based on a novel by Mary Johnston which was turned into a play in 1901 by E. F. Boddington. The Broadway version starred Isabel Irving and Robert Loraine in the lead roles. Also in this play was a 20-year-old actor and aspiring playwright named Cecil B. DeMille.

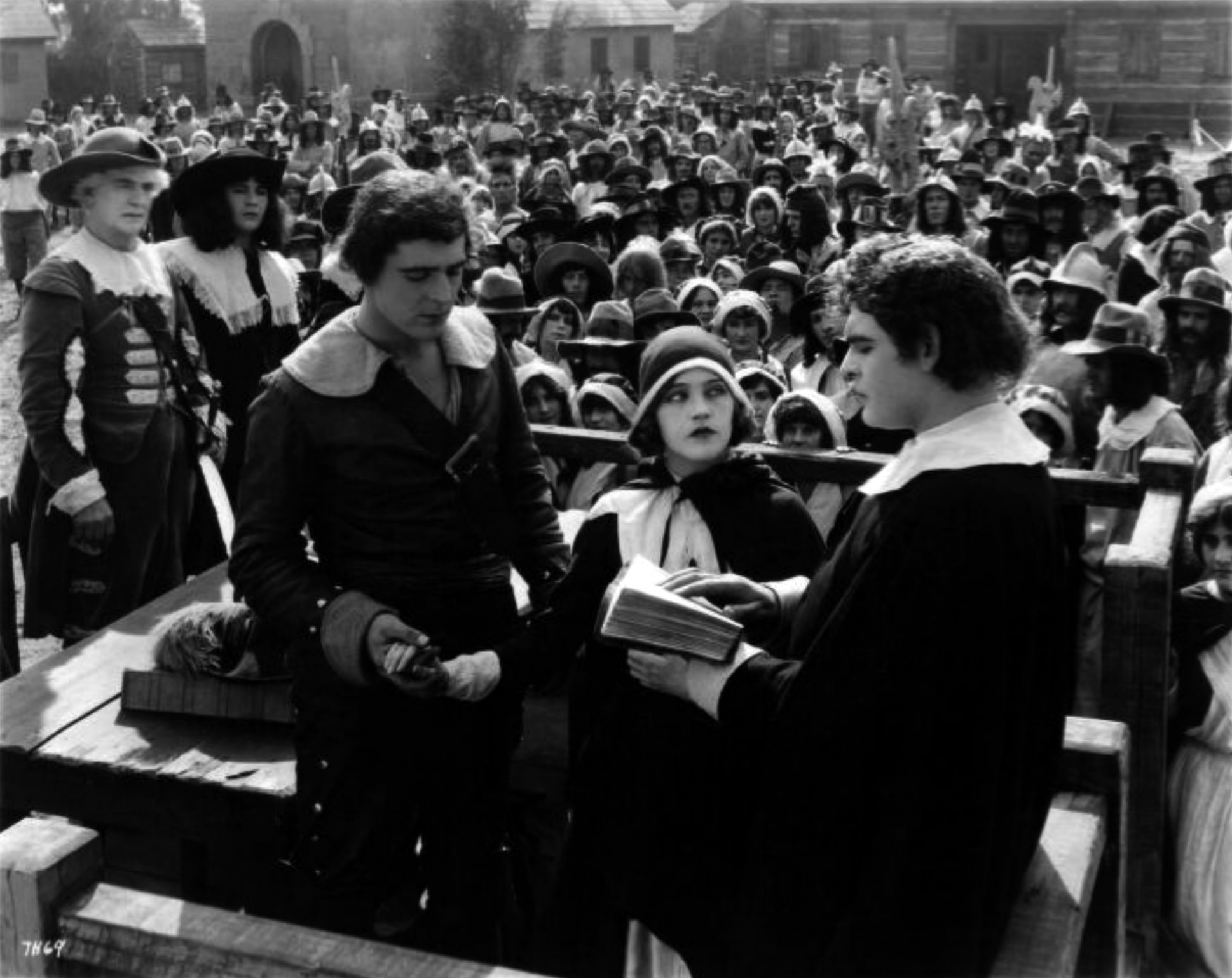
Wallace Reid and Mae Murray

== Plot ==
According to a film magazine, "To escape an unbearable marriage with the dissipated Lord Carnal, Lady Jocelyn Leigh, the ward of James I, flees to the Jamestown colony. Lord Carnal finally learns her whereabouts and arrives in Jamestown to find his prey already married to Captain Ralph Percy. After a long and hard tussle between the two men, Lord Carnal has to acknowledge himself defeated at all points. The girl, who has stuck by her husband through thick and thin, realizes the worth of the man whom she could not love at first and gives herself to him heart and soul. King James at last approves of the marriage of his ward."

== Cast ==
- Mae Murray – Lady Jocelyn
- Wallace Reid – Captain Ralph Percy
- Tom Forman – Lord Carnal
- Ronald Bradbury – Jeremy Sparrow
- Raymond Hatton – Nicolo
- James Neill – George Yeardley
- Lucien Littlefield – King James I
- Bob Fleming – Red Gill
- Camille Astor – Patience Worth

== Production ==
Rehearsals for To Have and to Hold were held in early January 1916, at the Lasky studios. Two ships were constructed at San Pedro and were then sailed to Santa Catalina Island for exteriors. A town was constructed on the Lasky lot to represent Jamestown, Virginia.

== Reception ==
Motion Picture News reviewer Peter Milne gave the film a positive review, describing the film as "lavish and spectacular." He praised Mae Murray's film debut as "one of the most appealing and attractive actresses that the screen has recruited from the stage" and called her "a star." The film was also praised for its "clear and thrilling" story.

Motography reviewer George W. Graves also gave the film a positive review, praising the cast for their performances and said "the story teems with adventure."

Wid's Films and Film Folk review was mostly positive, as "still there are a few bad moments which detract." The reviewer disliked the scenes with the miniatures, as they appeared "unrealistic." The tinting and toning of the film was praised for its complexity, creating the appearance of firelight on one side of the room and dark shadows on the other.

== Preservation ==
With no holdings located in archives, To Have and to Hold is considered a lost film.

== Other adaptations ==
In 1922, a second version was released once again by Paramount Pictures. It starred Bert Lytell and Betty Compson, and is also considered lost.

== See also ==
- List of lost films
