= To Have and to Hold (1922 film) =

1922 film by George Fitzmaurice

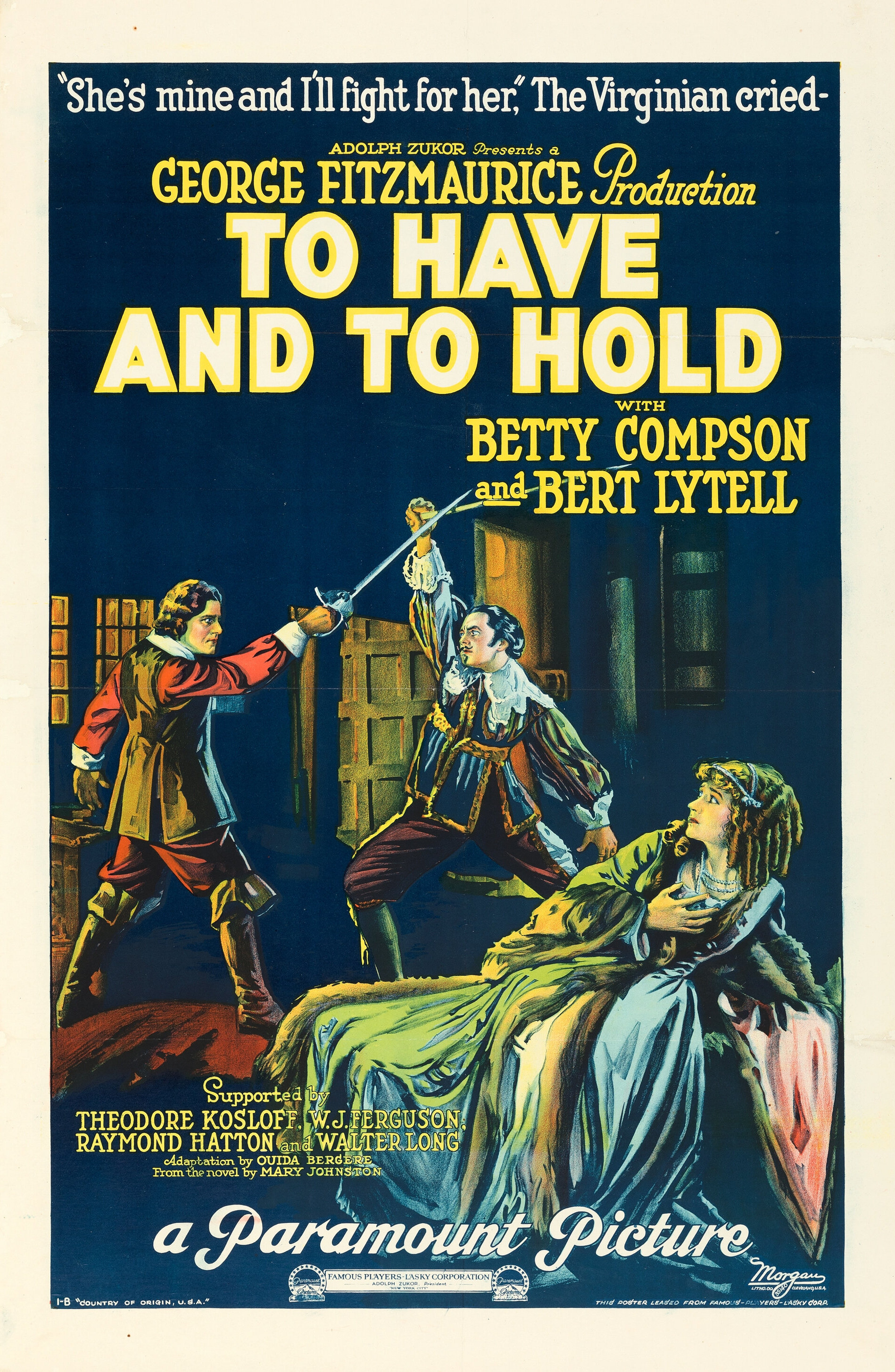
- Poster for the film
- Directed by: George Fitzmaurice
- Screenplay by: Ouida Bergère
- Based on: To Have and to Hold by Mary Johnston
- Produced by: Adolph Zukor; Jesse L. Lasky
- Starring: Bert Lytell; Betty Compson
- Cinematography: Arthur C. Miller
- Distributed by: Famous Players–Lasky Corporation; Paramount Pictures
- Release date: October 29, 1922 (United States)
- Country: United States
- Language: Silent (English intertitles)

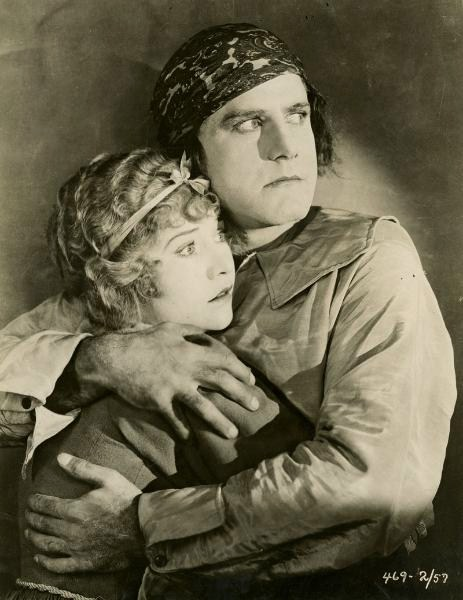
Publicity still of the film's stars, Betty Compson and Bert Lytell, 1922

To Have and to Hold is a lost 1922 American silent historical drama film based on the 1899 novel of the same name. The film was directed by George Fitzmaurice and starred Bert Lytell and Betty Compson.

The novel was first adapted for the screen in 1916 starring Mae Murray and Wallace Reid.

== Cast ==
- Betty Compson as Lady Jocelyn Leigh
- Bert Lytell as Captain Ralph Percy
- Theodore Kosloff as Lord Carnal
- William J. Ferguson as Jeremy Sparrow
- Raymond Hatton as King James I
- Claire Du Brey as Patience Worth
- Walter Long as Red Gill
- Anne Cornwall as Lady Jane Carr
- Fred Huntley as Paradise
- Arthur Rankin as Lord Cecil
- Lucien Littlefield as Duke of Buckingham

== Preservation ==
With no prints of To Have and to Hold located in any film archives, it is considered a lost film. In February 2021, the film was cited by the National Film Preservation Board on their Lost U.S. Silent Feature Films list.

== See also ==
- List of lost films
