= An Apology for Poetry =

1595 essay by Philip Sidney

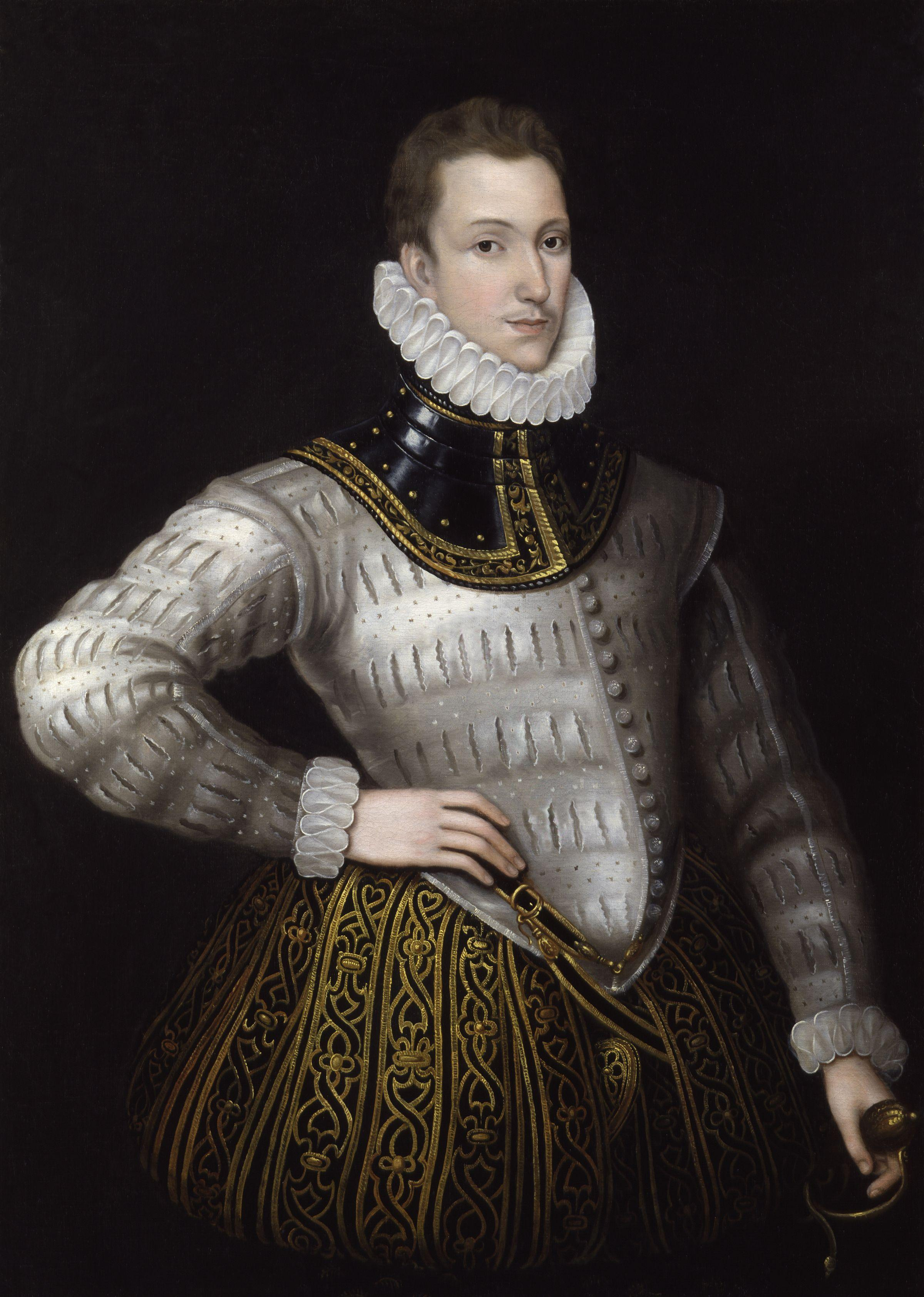
Sidney

An Apology for Poetry (or The Defence of Poesy) is a work of literary criticism by Elizabethan poet Philip Sidney. It was written in approximately 1580 and first published in 1595, after his death.

It is generally believed that he was at least partly motivated by Stephen Gosson, a former playwright who dedicated his attack on the English stage, The School of Abuse, to Sidney in 1579, but Sidney primarily addresses more general objections to poetry, such as those of Plato. In his essay, Sidney integrates a number of classical and Italian precepts on fiction. The essence of his defense is that poetry, by combining the liveliness of history with the ethical focus of philosophy, is more effective than either history or philosophy in rousing its readers to virtue. The work also offers important comments on Edmund Spenser and the Elizabethan stage. Sidney states that there "have been three general kinds" of poetry: (i) "the chief" being religious which "imitate[d] the inconceivable excellencies of God", (ii) philosophical and (iii) imaginative poetry written by "right poets" who "teach and delight". It serves as an immediate motivation for Philip Sidney to write against the attacks done on poetry.

== Influence ==
Philip Sidney's influence can be seen throughout the subsequent history of English literary criticism. One of the most important examples is in the work of the poet and critic Percy Bysshe Shelley. Shelley's modern argument for poetry is cast in a Romantic strain in his critical work "A Defence of Poetry". In 1858, William Stigant, a Cambridge-educated translator, poet and essayist, writes in his essay "Sir Philip Sidney" that Shelley's "beautifully written Defence of Poetry is a work which "analyses the very inner essence of poetry and the reason of its existence,—its development from, and operation on, the mind of man". Shelley writes in Defence that while "ethical science arranges the elements which poetry has created", and leads to a moral civil life, poetry acts in a way that "awakens and enlarges the mind itself by rendering it the receptacle of a thousand unapprehended combinations of thought".

Sidney's influence on future critics and poets relates more closely to his view of the place of poets in society. Sidney describes poetry as creating a separate reality. The Romantic notion, as seen in Wordsworth, is that poetry privileges perception, imagination and modes of understanding. Wordsworth seeks to go back to nature for moments recollected in tranquility. Sidney, like Shelley and Wordsworth, sees the poet as being separate from society. To Sidney the poet is not tied to any subjection. He saw art as equivalent to "skill", a profession to be learned or developed, and nature as the objective, empirical world. The poet can invent, and thus in effect grows another nature.

Sidney writes that there "is no art delivered to mankind that hath not the works of nature for his principal object". The poet then does not depart from external nature. His works are "imitation" or "fiction", made of the materials of nature, and are shaped by the artist's vision. This vision is one that demands the reader's awareness of the art of imitation created through the "maker", the poet. Sidney's notion of "fore-conceit" means that a conception of the work must exist in the poet's mind before it is written. Free from the limitations of nature, and independent from nature, poetry is capable of "making things either better than Nature bringeth forth, or, quite anew, forms such as never were in Nature".

Sidney's doctrine presents the poet as creator. The poet's mediating role between two worlds – transcendent forms and historical actuality – corresponds to the Neoplatonic doctrine of emanation. A complement to this doctrine is the concept of return or catharsis, which finds a parallel in Sidney's contemplation of virtue, based on man's rational desire. Apology contains only elements of Neoplatonism without adhering to the full doctrine.

Thirdly, Sidney implies a theory of metaphoric language in his work. A recurring motif in Apology is painting or “portraiture”. Apology applies language use in a way suggestive of what is known in modern literary theory as semiotics. His central premise, as was that of Socrates in Plato's Republic, is that poetry is an art of imitation, that is, a "representing, counterfeiting, or figuring forth" not unlike a "speaking picture". Sidney pays his homage to Aristotle also. Yet he develops his own idea of metaphoric language, one that it is based on an analogy through universal correspondences. Sidney's humanist poetics and his tendency to harmonize disparate extremes – to seek mediation – find expression in poetic works by John Donne.

The life and writings of Sir Philip Sidney remain a legacy. In 1819, Thomas Campbell concludes that Sidney's life was "poetry in action", and then in 1858 William Stigant wrote that "Sidney's real poem was his life, and his teaching was his example". Sidney, the man, is apparent everywhere in his works: a study of Sidney's works is a study of the man.

== Significance ==
An Apology for Poetry is one of the most important contributions to literary theory written in English during the Renaissance. Sidney advocates a place for poetry within the framework of an aristocratic state, while showing concern for both literary and national identity. Sidney responds in Apology to an emerging antipathy to poetry as expressed in Stephen Gosson's The Schoole of Abuse. Gosson offers what is in essence an attack on imaginative literature (Griffiths 5). What is at stake in Sidney's argument is a defense of poetry's nobility. The significance of the nobility of poetry is its power to move readers to virtuous action. True poets must teach and delight – a view that dates back to Horace.

In an era of antipathy to poetry and puritanical belief in the corruption engendered by literature, Sidney's defense was a significant contribution to the genre of literary criticism. It was England's first philosophical defense in which he describes poetry's ancient and indispensable place in society, its mimetic nature, and its ethical function. Among Sidney's gifts to his contemporaries were his respect for tradition and willingness to experiment. An example of the latter is his approach to Plato. He reconfigures Plato's argument against poets by saying poets are "the least liar". Poets never claim to know the truth, nor “make circles around your imagination,” nor rely on authority. As an expression of a cultural attitude descending from Aristotle, Sidney, when stating that the poet "never affirmeth", makes the claim that all statements in literature are hypothetical or pseudo-statements. Sidney as a traditionalist, however, gives attention to drama in contradistinction to poetry. Drama, writes Sidney, is “observing neither rules of honest civility nor of skillful poetry” and thus cannot do justice to this genre.

In Sidney's day anti-theatricality, an aesthetic and ideological concern, flourished among Sidney's circle at court. Theatre became a contentious issue in part because of the culmination of a growing contempt for the values of the emergent consumer culture. An expanding money economy encouraged social mobility. Europe, at this time, had its first encounter with inflation. London's theatres at that time grew in popularity so much that by 1605, despite the introduction of charges, London commercial theatres could accommodate up to eight thousand men and women. Sidney had his own views on drama. In Apology, he shows opposition to the current of his day that pays little attention to unity of place in drama, but more specifically, his concern is with the "manner" that the "matter" is conveyed. He explains that tragedy is not bound to history or the narrative but to "laws of poesy," having "liberty, either to feign a quite new matter, or to frame the history to the most tragical conveniency."

Sidney employs a number of strategies to assert the proper place of poetry. For instance, he argues against the way in which poetry was misaligned with youth, the effeminate and the timorous. He does so by introducing the idea that “poetry is the companion of camps” and by invoking the heroes of ages past. Sidney's reverence for the poet as soldier is significant because he himself was a soldier at one time. Poetry, in Apology, becomes an art that requires the noble stirring of courage.

Sidney writes An Apology for Poetry in the form of a judicial oration for the defense, and thus it is like a trial in structure. Crucial to his defense is the descriptive discourse and the idea that poetry creates a separate reality. Sidney employs forensic rhetoric as a tool to make the argument that poetry not only conveys a separate reality, but that it has a long and venerable history, and it does not lie. It is defensible in its own right as a means to move readers to virtuous action.

== Sidney's method ==
Censorship is one issue Sidney had to overcome through his use of rhetorical devices in the Apology. Sidney was also versed in the phenomenon of courtiership. As part of his strategy against the threat of censorship, Sidney uses the structure of classical oration with its conventional divisions such as exordium and peroratio. Sidney's use of classical oration stems from his humanist education (Harvey 1). He uses this method to build his argument, by making user of the rhetorical methods in such guides as Thomas Wilson’s Arte of Rhetorique (1553) (Harvey 2). Sidney also uses metaphor and allegory, to conceal and reveal his position. For instance, his use of horsemanship as imagery and analogy substantiates his vision of the transformational power of poetry. Sidney, as author, enters his work undetected in that the etymology of his name “Philip” is “horse-lover” (Pask 7). From the opening discourse on horsemanship, Sidney expands on the horse and saddle metaphor throughout his work by the “enlarging of a conceit” (Leitch 333). It is Sidney who then guards against a falling out with the “poet-whippers” (Leitch 346). Sidney also attends to the rhetorical concept of memory. Poetry, apart from its ability to delight, has an affinity with memory (Leitch 347).

Method and style are thus key components of the Apology to overcome the problem of censorship. For this reason, Sidney consciously defends fiction, and he attacks the privilege that is accorded to “fact.” He argues that the poet makes no literal claims of truth, is under no illusions, and thus creates statements that are in a sense “fictional” and as true as any others (Bear 5). What is at stake then is not only the value of poetry in the sense of its utility, but also its place in a world replete with strife, the contingent and the provisional.

== Editions ==
- Ponsonby, William, ed. (1595). The Defence of Poesie. London: William Ponsonby. Freely available 1595 edition and 1928 Noel Douglas Replicas reprint from Internet Archive
- Arber, Edward, ed. (1868). An Apologie for Poetrie. London: A. Murray & Son. Freely available from Internet Archive
- Cook, Albert, ed. (1890). The Defense of Poesy (Otherwise Known as an Apology for Poetry). Boston: Ginn & Co. Freely available from Internet Archive
- Morley, Henry, ed. (1891). A Defence of Poesie and Poems. London: Cassel.
- Arber, Edward, ed. (1901). Apologie for Poetrie. Westminster: A. Constable and Co. [reprint]
- Morley, Henry, ed. (1909). A Defence of Poesie and Poems (Cassell's Little Classics reprint ed.). London: Cassel. Freely available from Internet Archive
- van Dorsten, Jan A., ed. (1966). A Defence of Poetry. Oxford: Oxford University Press.
- van Dorsten, Jan A.; Duncan-Jones, Katherine, eds. (20 December 1973). Miscellaneous Prose of Sir Philip Sidney. Oxford: Clarendon Press. ISBN 9780198118800.
- Shepherd, Geoffrey; Maslen, R.W., eds. (4 October 2002). An Apology For Poetry (Or The Defence Of Poesy) (Revised and expanded Third ed.). Manchester: Manchester University Press. ISBN 978-0-7190-5376-4.
- collected in: Alexander, Gavin, ed. (2004). Sidney's 'The Defence of Poesy' and Selected Renaissance Literary Criticism. London: Penguin Books. ISBN 978-0-14-193695-6.
