= Leonard Fryer (16th-century artist) =

English artist

Leonard Fryer or Frier (died 1605) was an English artist who served the royal court, primarily as a decorative painter.

== Career ==
He was probably a son of William Fryer, a London painter, and Anne Owen, a daughter of a Hondsditch gunfounder John Owen. Fryer joined the London Painter-Stainers Company in 1576.

Fryer was a sergeant-painter to Queen Elizabeth. Records of these appointments are complex and potential benefits were shared with other painters. In 1598, his office of sergeant-painter was confirmed for life. On 26 April 1605, in the reigh of James VI and I another grant of the office was made, with survivorship to Leonard Fryer and John de Critz of the office of sergeant-painter, revoking a previous grant to Leonard Fryer with reversion to John de Critz. As De Critz was shortly afterwards in sole possession of the office, and obtained several contracts from the royal works, it is probable that Fryer had become inactive through illness and died soon after.

Queen Elizabeth employed Leonard Fryer to decorate the long gallery at Oatlands with a woodgrain pattern in 1598. He primed the panelling with white lead paint and then painted imitation "flotherwoode", with gold and silver highlights on the mouldings, with arabesque patterns and paintwork of "markatree", perhaps resembling marquetry. He finished the graining with "sweet varnish", probably chosen for its pleasing scent.

At Greenwich Palace, Fryer painted benches using "jasper" colour, and in later years "rance water colour" coated with mastic for the garden and orchard. He painted the lead canopy over a seating area beside a mulberry blue. "Rance" or "raunce" was a reddish variety of Tournai marble prized by monumental masons, but the paintwork could also be white and black. The canopy was constructed by William Portington, and Fryer painted the posts "ashcolour" and "jasper-like raunce in water colour". He also gilded finials on the seats.

Fryer painted banners and gilded replicas of the crown jewels for the effigy at the funeral of Elizabeth I. The horses had ostrich feather plumes supplied by William Cookesbury, and Fryer gilded the leather trappings. In the first year of the reign of James VI and I, Fryer painted the ceiling of the old Banqueting House at Whitehall Palace with 537 square yards of "work called clouds".

Fryer's will mentions an outstanding debt for painting at the coronation of King James and Anne of Denmark in July 1603 and their subsequent Royal Entry to London in March 1604.

The Painter-Stainers' Hall in London contains a richly chased cup presented by Leonard Fryer to the company in 1605.

== A family business ==
Leonard's brother Robert Fryer (died 1617) was also a painter, although details of his work have not been discovered. Robert and Leonard's sons were also painters. They signed a petition about smalt, a blue pigment made from powdered cobalt glass. A payment to a "Reynold Fryer" in 1598 for painting doors, woodwork, and panelling at Greenwich Palace in yellow and jasper colours may indicate another brother, or "Reynold" may be a scribe's error for "Leonard".
