= Coronation of Anne of Denmark =

The Coronation of Anne of Denmark could refer to:

- Entry and coronation of Anne of Denmark, her coronation as queen of Scotland; or
- Coronation of James I and Anne, her coronation alongside her husband, as queen of England.
