= William Cookesbury =

William Cookesbury or Coksbery, or Cookisbury was a London capper, haberdasher, and supplier of feathers.

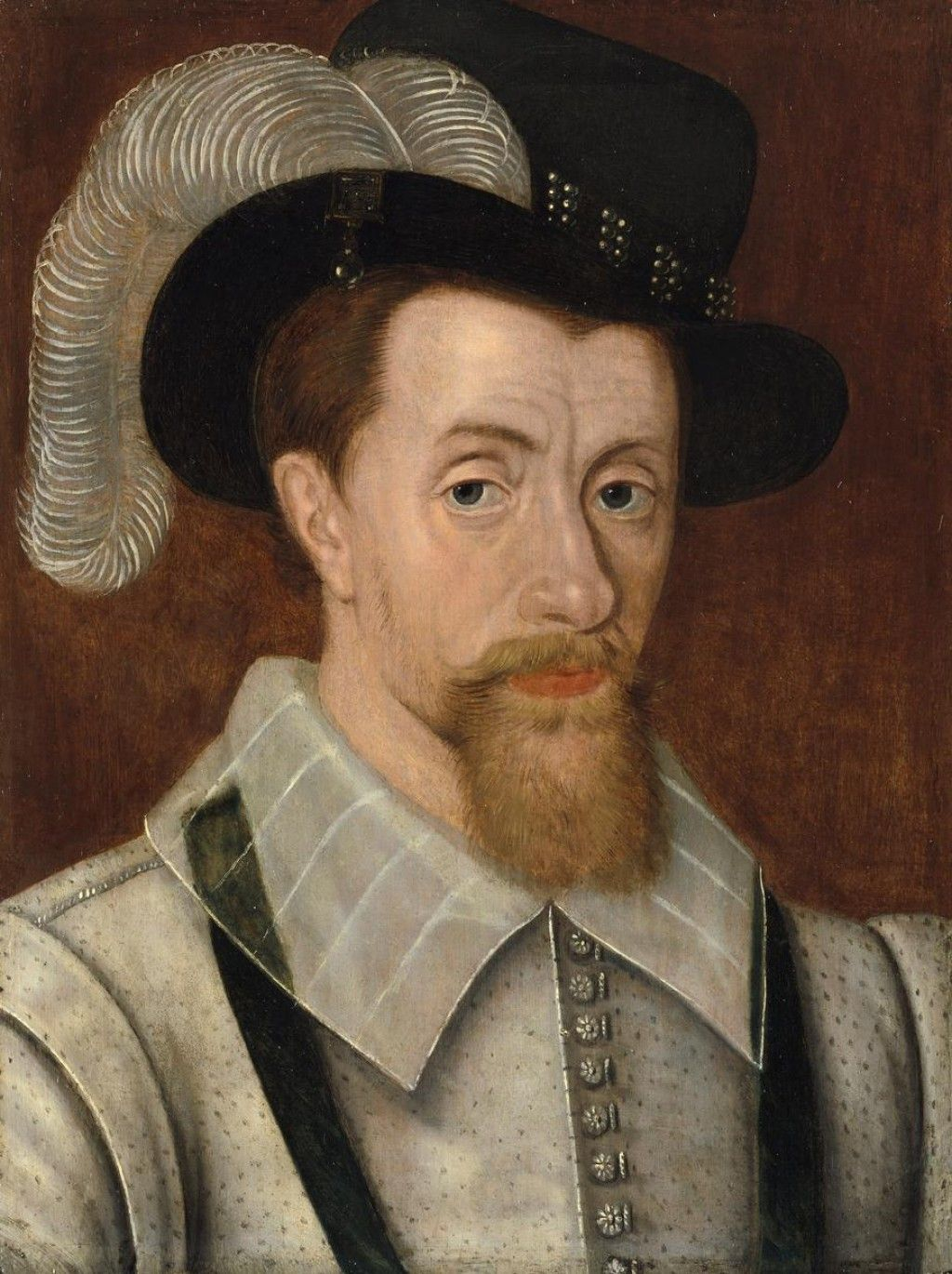
William Cookesbury was particularly known for supplying hats and feathers to James VI and I

Cookesbury supplied caps and hats to Elizabeth I from 1584 and was listed as the queen's capper to Elizabeth I in November 1587. He made caps and hat for the queen from velvet and taffeta in 1584. Although he continued working for the queen his name is not mentioned much in her surviving accounts. Cookesbury provided plumes of ostrich feathers for the horses at the funeral of Elizabeth I, their trappings were gilded by the painter Leonard Fryer.

Cookesbury worked for James VI and I and Anne of Denmark after the Union of the Crowns in 1603. Orders from King James include, 17 black beaver hats lined with rich taffeta, with treble black "sipers" bands and plumes of black feathers to them; a hat of black beaver richly embroidered with a plume of white feathers, a hat of ash colour beaver lined with green taffeta with a band embroidered with Venice gold and silver and a plume of gold to it, others hats, one with a plume of white feathers and a bird of paradise with a velvet band for the King's jewels, and hats for Prince Henry. It seems likely that he made matching hats for James, Henry, and Anne of Denmark.

Wearing matching outfits had already become a habit at the Stuart court, Anne of Denmark and her ladies-in-waiting in Scotland, Margaret Vinstarr and Marie Stewart, and a page William Belo, had also sometimes worn matching outfits and hats.

Cookesbury supplied feathers to decorate the chariots and canopies used at the Royal Entry to London in 1604. He also supplied plumes of feathers for beds, which typically topped the corners of the canopy. These were made from egret feathers and dyed in various colours. Plumes were also supplied to the royal horses. Cookesbury supplied "divers ffanes and fethers" for the masque costumes of The Vision of the Twelve Goddesses, which he delivered to Audrey Walsingham and Elizabeth Carey.

For the wedding of Frederick V of the Palatinate and Princess Elizabeth in 1613, Cookesbury provided eight plumes of feathers, dressed with fine Venice gold and spangles. Cookesbury's son-in-law and business associate Denis Peper or Peiper supplied five hats of "tawny beaver" with tawny feathers.

King James made Cookesbury and his son-in-law Denis Peiper his official suppliers of hats and feathers for his beds and stables in around 1607, and so he was known as a royal haberdasher and received a retaining fee. In 1637, an old debt of £61 due to Cookesbury was paid to Marian Motteram.
