= Coronation of James I and Anne =

1603 coronation in England

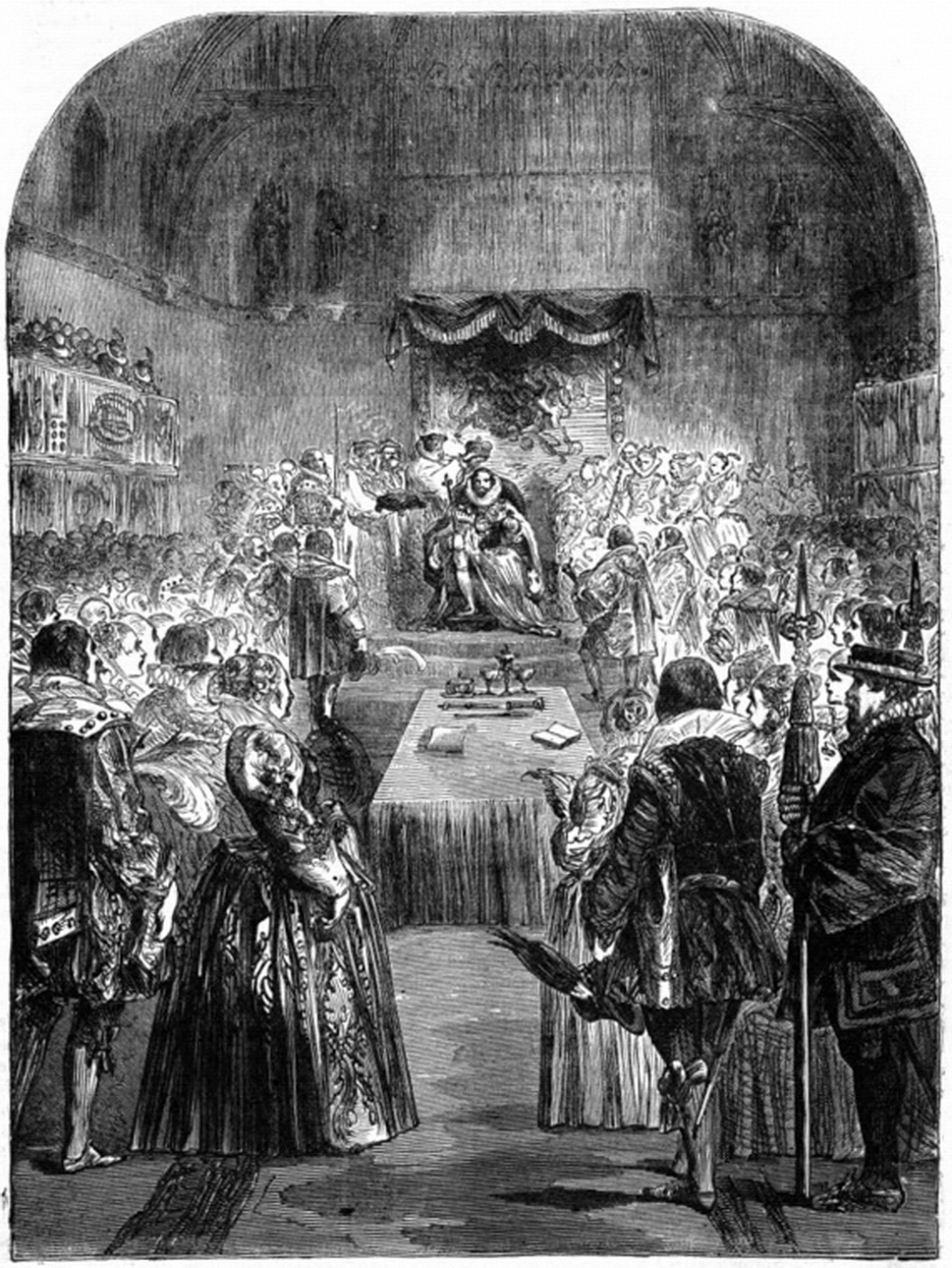
- Coronation of James I (19th century image)
- Date: 25 July 1603; 423 years ago
- Location: Westminster Abbey, London, England
- Participants: King James I; Queen Anne; Great Officers of State; Bishops of the Church of England; Peers of the Realm

The coronation of James I and his wife Anne of Denmark as king and queen of England and Ireland was held on 25 July 1603 at Westminster Abbey. James had reigned as king of Scotland since 1567. Anne was anointed and consecrated with prayers alluding to Esther, the Wise Virgins, and other Biblical heroines. It was the first coronation to be conducted in English instead of Latin. Because of the 1603 London plague, a planned ceremonial Royal Entry to London was deferred until 15 March 1604.

== Background and preparations ==
After the death of Elizabeth I on 24 March 1603, James VI of Scotland became King of England, an event known as the Union of the Crowns. He had been crowned King of Scotland on 29 July 1567 at Stirling. His wife, Anne of Denmark, had been crowned in Edinburgh on 17 May 1590.

=== Journeys to London ===
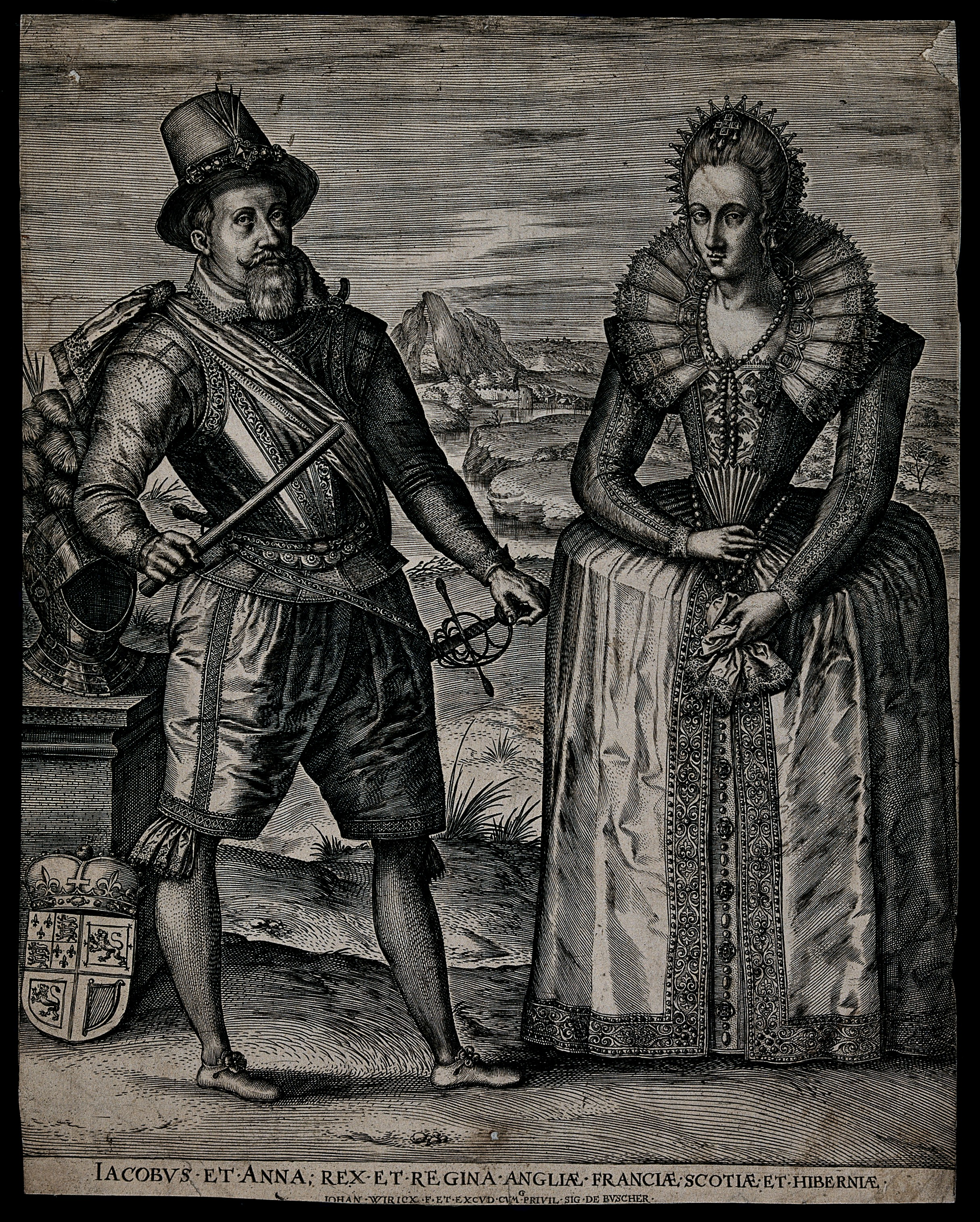
James VI and I and Anne of Denmark, engraving by Johannes Wierix

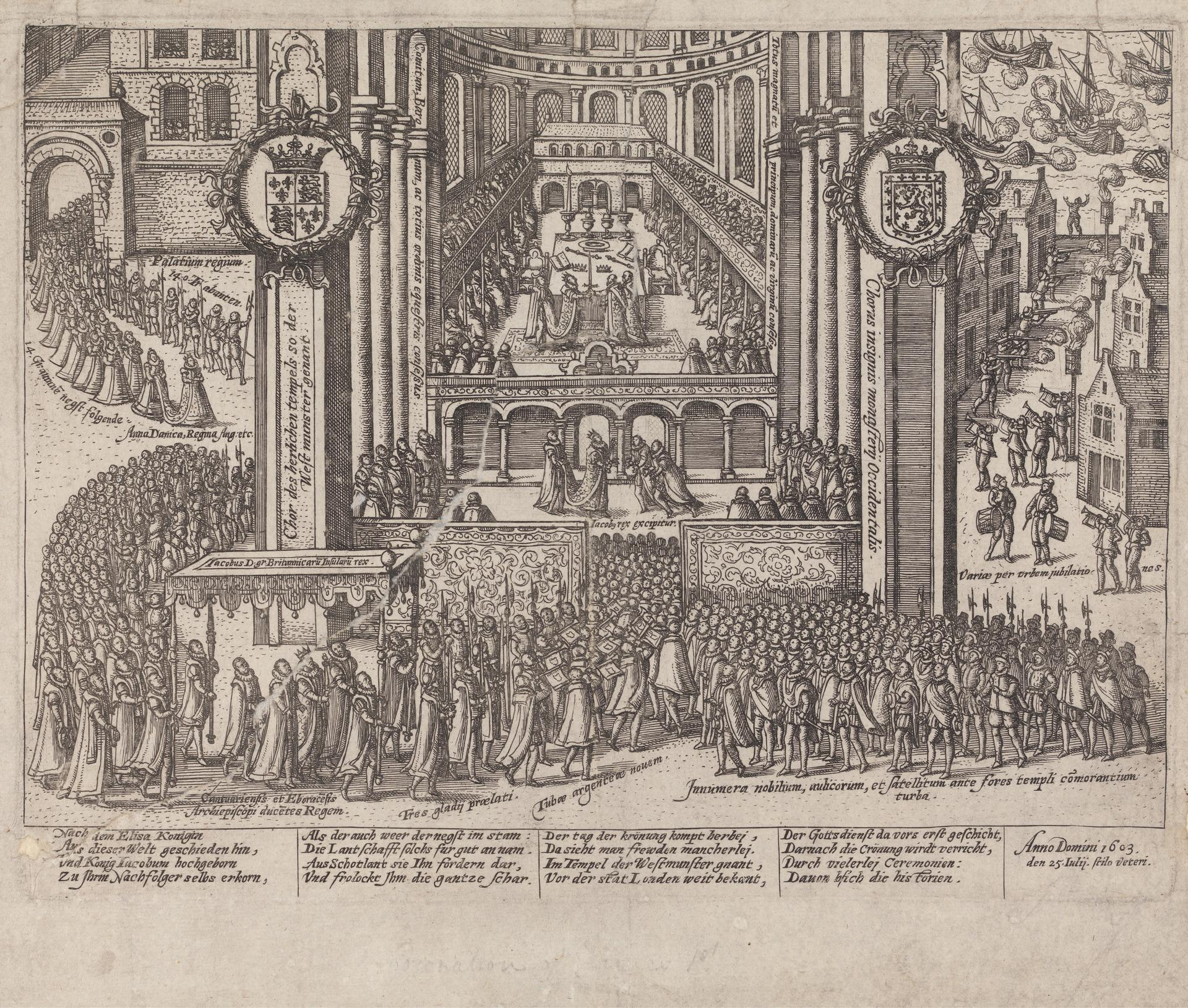
A German engraving of the coronation shows James entering the Abbey after his trumpeters, and Anne approaching in a separate procession with 14 countesses.

James rode to England visiting country houses along the way and knighting many of his new subjects. James met the statesman Robert Cecil at York on 19 April, and it was decided he would be crowned with Anne on 25 July. James arrived at Theobalds on 3 May 1603, and came to London on 7 May. Richard Martin, a lawyer, gave a speech on behalf of the Mayor and Aldermen, praising James as the "Bright star of the North".

James stayed for three days at the Charterhouse, then moved first to the Tower of London, and on 13 May to Greenwich Palace. On 23 May the court moved again, to Whitehall Palace. His wife, Anne of Denmark, followed in June, after suffering a miscarriage at Stirling Castle. In London, there were rumours that the royal couple's son Charles had died. Queen Anne travelled a similar route through England with her children Henry and with Elizabeth, who was left with her new guardians at Coombe Abbey. Charles remained at Dunfermline Palace. James met Anne at Easton Neston the house of George Fermor in Northamptonshire on 27 June, and they travelled to Windsor Castle, visiting courtiers' houses along the way.

=== Plague ===
Plans for the coronation were disrupted by an outbreak of plague. The number of guests and officials allowed within the Abbey was strictly limited. The subdued nature of this coronation was noted, and three years later a ceremony at Windsor Castle to invest the Earl of Salisbury and Viscount Bindon as Knights of the Garter was said to have been much more magnificent. More recently, historians have reassessed the importance of the event and the priorities of King James.

=== Commission for the coronation ===
A commission was established to adjudicate any competing claims to hereditary or feudal rights to offices and services at the ceremony. The commissioners declared on 18 July that the traditional procession through the city would be severely curtailed. There would be no customary feast, and the James confirmed from Windsor on 6 June that the Royal Entry was deferred to the next year. The date of the ceremony was kept because it was auspicious as the feast day of Saint James, the king's name saint, and, according to the Venetian diplomat Scaramelli, political events including the main and bye plots made James anxious to take the coronation oaths and so "settle his affairs".

Edward Kelk and Francis Raworth followed the work of the Commission for the town of Sandwich and the Cinque Ports. Kelk wrote on 11 July that James would not process through the city. He thought men or Barons from the Cinque Ports would carry the king's canopy in the Abbey, and they heard that Anne of Denmark's coronation would be deferred till the winter. On 15 July, it was confirmed that both James and Anne would crowned and the Barons of the Cinque Ports would carry two canopies. Kelk looked into precedents for the robes required, and Raworth noted that scarlet cloth was £3-10s and red satin 15 shillings or more per yard. The 16 Barons were to wear crimson velvet shoes and broad black velvet hats.

The merchant and mercer Baptist Hicks was asked to supply crimson velvet, damask and satin, but was left with 1,400 yards of unused fabric. Sir George Carew bought 156 gilt halberds for the royal guard at the coronation and "tilt staves" and other equipment for jousting or "running at the ring" at a coronation tournament. A new imperial crown was made. The goldsmiths William Herrick and John Spilman provided a cloth-of-estate for the Abbey embroidered with pearls and imitation counterfeit gemstones. They made a jewelled circlet for Anne of Denmark, and refashioned the armill, ampulla, and sceptre for the ceremony. Some of the gems for the circlet were taken from the jewels of Elizabeth I. Herrick and Spilman also made a hat badge of precious stones in the shape of an initial "I" for James, using a diamond taken from an old jewel in Anne's inventory.

The commission made its decisions on rights and honours on 24 July. It refrained from deciding on some claims, including that of Sir Oliver Leigh, who as lord of the manor of Addington in Surrey, alleged to be entitled to provide the royals with a mess or dish of "herout or pigernout" made in the royal kitchen. His ancestor, Nicholas Leigh, had claimed the same right to "make a mess of pottage in a pot of clay" or "degeront" at the coronations of Edward VI in 1547 and Mary I in 1553.

The chancellor of the exchequer and master of the wardrobe, John Fortescue of Salden, was in charge of £5000 spent on the coronation, and £3000 spent on the funeral of Elizabeth I. For his security, James requested 100 soldiers from the trained bands of Surrey. 500 soldiers were hired at eight pence per day to guard against "any tumults and disorder" in Westminster and the Strand. Measures were taken to keep spectators away from royal family for fear of plague, and it was forbidden to sight-see from boats on the river.

== Order of service ==
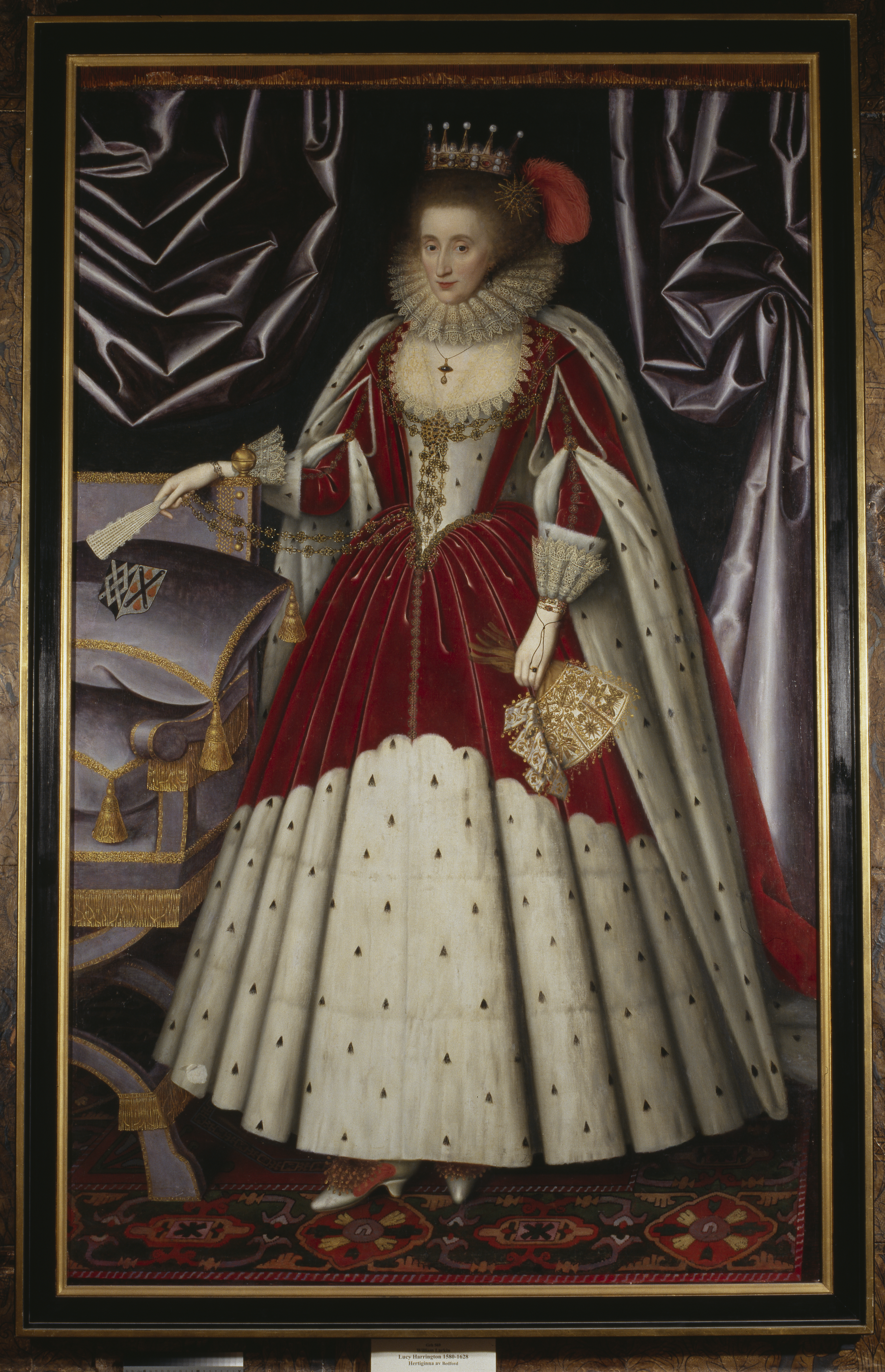
Lucy Russell, Countess of Bedford, in an ermine-trimmed gown with long sleeves

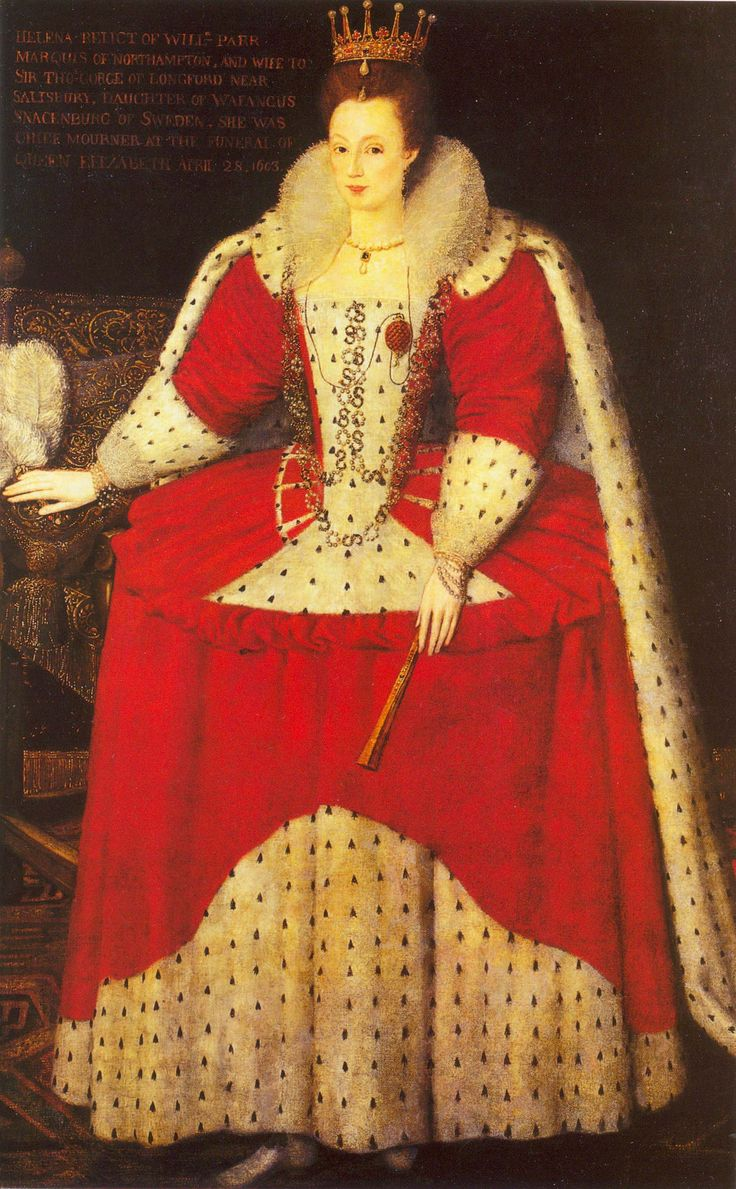
Helena Snakenborg, Marchioness of Northampton, in scarlet and ermine

The English Reformation had made the form of the coronation service problematic, as previous coronations included Roman Catholic rites. On 15 May 1603, the Venetian ambassador reported that the College of Heralds was scouring the archives for precedents. It was decided to make a new translation of the Liber Regalis, the 14th-century coronation order, ignoring Tudor additions and removing any elements that were contrary to Anglican doctrine. The driving force behind this decision may have been the antiquary William Camden. Camden and other scholars argued that the new Church of England was the inheritor of an ancient tradition of English Christian worship. The final decision on the order of service was made by John Whitgift, the archbishop of Canterbury. The majority of the liturgy was translated into English, but some elements, such as the Litany, were retained in the original Latin. The coronation oath was to be made in Latin, English and French, because of the claim to the French throne.

== The coronation ==
On Sunday 24 July, James created a number of new Knights of the Bath in the gallery of Whitehall Palace. The next day, James and Anne embarked on a gilded royal barge at Whitehall Steps, located near the present-day Horse Guards Avenue, and travelled the short distance upriver to a jetty at Westminster. Despite a proclamation that spectators should stay away because of the plague, the streets around the abbey and boats on the river were crowded with onlookers. It was raining.

They walked first to Westminster Hall. The purple velvet train of the queen's gown was held by one of her ladies and her chamberlain, an honour disputed by two rival claimants, Edward de Vere, 17th Earl of Oxford and Daniel Cage, whose father had acquired Great Hormead, one of the manors attached to the chamberlain's office. The ambition of Daniel Cage (died 1634) to act as the queen's page in the procession was not realised.

The ceremony was described by the Venetian diplomat Scaramelli and others including Giovanni degli Effetti, an agent of the Papal nuncio in France, Innocenzo del Buffalo, and Benjamin von Buwinckhausen, a diplomat from the Duchy of Württemberg. Scaramelli (who did not attend in person) described a procession of heralds, followed by the mayor, Robert Lee, and city dignitaries, lawyers and judges, the Knights of the Bath, and aristocrats. King James entered walking under a canopy, followed by members of his household and halbardiers of the royal guard. Queen Anne walked under similar canopy, dressed robes of crimson velvet lined with ermine, accompanied by Arbella Stuart, preceded by a dozen countesses in pairs carrying coronets including Lucy Russell, Countess of Bedford, Helena Snakenborg, Marchioness of Northampton, and the Countess of Cumberland, her household following. James and Anne were seated before the high altar on a pair of chairs.

The first ceremony was the traditional "recognition", where the monarch was shown to the people as the "rightful heritor of the crown". From the surviving manuscript evidence of the order of ceremony, it seems that the speech given by the Archbishop of Canterbury, John Whitgift, was edited to remove a suggestion that the recognition was framed as a question accepting assent from the people. However, an account of the coronation by a lawyer Humphrey Repington does represent the recognition as a kind of election.

James was crowned by the Archbishop John Whitgift. He changed into the ancient robes which were said to have belonged to Edward the Confessor. He was then seated on the Coronation Chair containing the Stone of Scone on an octagonal dais. After Anne was crowned she was seated beside him on a "somewhat lower" throne. James took communion as indicated in the order of service, Anne did not. Scaramelli was told that the issue of taking the sacrament had been discussed in the morning and the queen had emphatically refused. Thomas Bilson gave the sermon.

Scaramelli says that the earls came forward to do homage by touching the crown, and Philip Herbert, Earl of Montgomery, and royal favourite, gave the king a kiss on his cheek. James dismissed him with a slap, a "little cuff" or schiaffetto in the original Italian.

=== Stone of destiny ===
Contemporary writers acknowledged a prophetic connection between the accession of the Scottish king and the use of the stone from Scone and Edward's chair. John Speed translated a Latin verse associated with the stone:

If fates goe right this stone, where e'ver tis pight,
The Scot shall find, and there his Raigne assign'd

This verse prophecy means the stone retains its significance wherever it is located. A Latin version of the verse was said to have been inscribed on the stone by the order of King Kenneth in 850, and recent examinations found few traces of lettering. A 17th-century herald and author, Francis Sandford, summarized the significance of the stone at the coronation:

the Coronation of the King and Queen (preceded by divers Promotions to Titles of Honour, and performed with all the Magnificence and Antient Rights of the English Kings) at Westminster, the 25th of July, being the Feast of St. James, An. 1603. by the hands of John Whitgift, Archbishop of Canterbury; where the Antique Regal Chair of Inthronization did happily receive, with the Person of His Majesty, the full accomplishment of that Prophetical Prediction of this His coming to the Crown of England.

=== Music ===
No detailed description of the music used at the coronation has survived. The procession on foot between Westminster Hall and Westminster Abbey was probably accompanied by the anthem, O Lord, grant the King a long life, the text taken from Psalm 61, set to music by either by Thomas Weelkes or Thomas Tomkins. The processional anthem inside the abbey was Behold, our Lord and protector; after the Recognition, Let thy hand be strengthened; during the Anointing, Veni Creator; and after the crowning, Be strong and of good courage and The King shall rejoice both combined into one piece. It is unclear who wrote the music for these, except for the last which is generally attributed to Tomkins. The composer William Byrd was still a prominent Gentleman of the Chapel Royal in 1603 and it is almost certain that he also contributed.

=== Costume ===
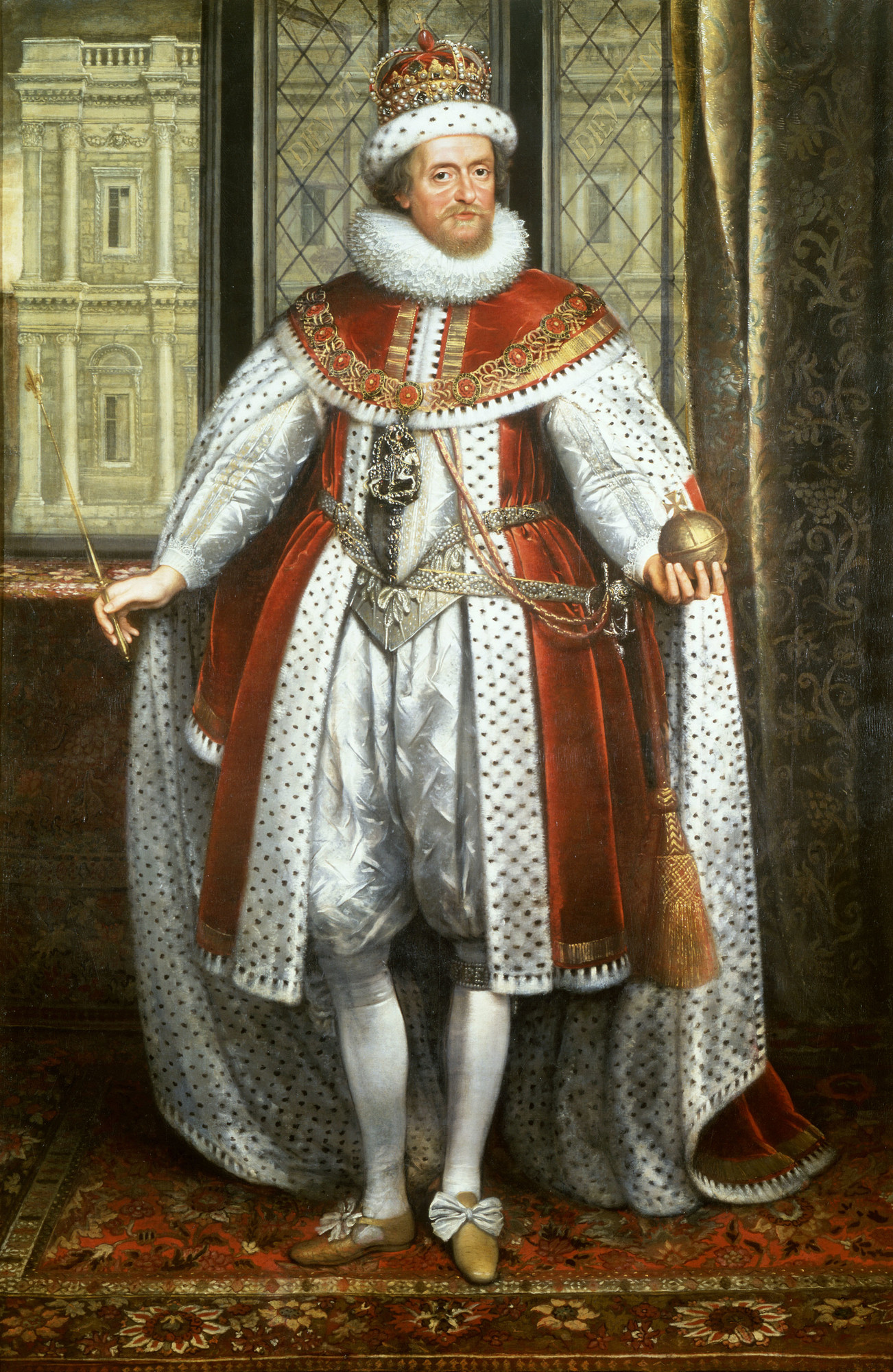
James I in coronation robes, Paul van Somer, c.1620

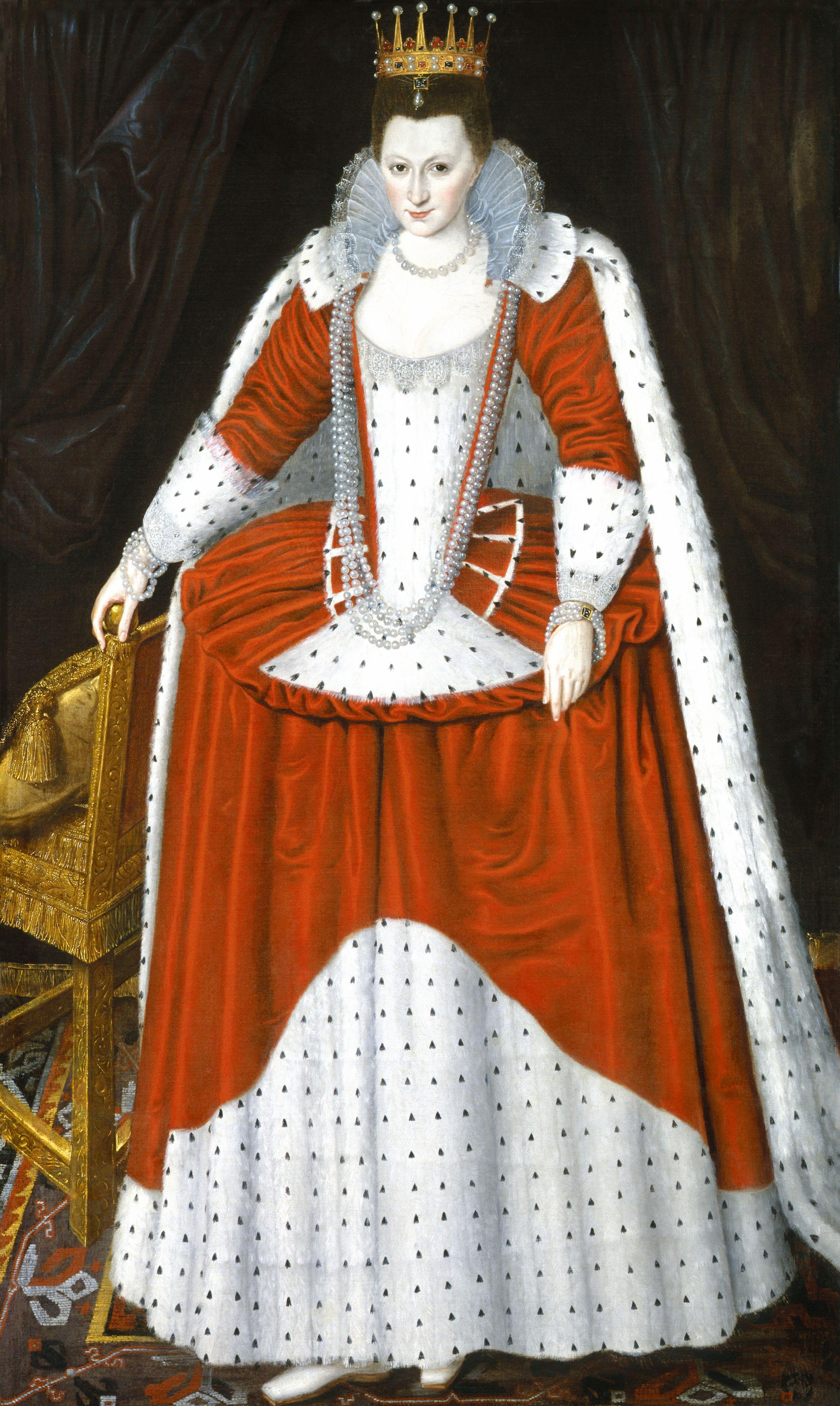
A countess dressed in scarlet and ermine and a drum farthingale, National Portrait Gallery, London

The commissioners had allowed the earl of Oxford his right as high chamberlain to dress the king. According to Giovanni degli Effetti, James was dressed in a similar manner to the earls, wearing a crimson velvet cloak over a velvet coat lined with ermine, and a velvet and ermine cap. The earls wore gold coronets in the place of a hat band. Probably, James' outfit was created by his Scottish tailor Alexander Miller, who had come to London in the royal entourage.

The National Museum of Scotland has a period wooden model of James possibly represented wearing his coronation robes. A portrait by Paul van Somer (c. 1620) shows the king in his ermine lined robes over white satin doublet and breeches, with a view of the Whitehall Banqueting House behind him. The bills for Anne's and James' coronation costume were not paid for several years, and the debt was cited as one of the reasons for selling off crown lands in 1609.

Anne's coronation costume was made of crimson and purple velvet lined with powdered ermines, and perfumed with musk, civet, and ambergris. An Order of Service mentions (in Latin) that her costume would be unadorned with embroidery (a detail noted by Giovanni degli Effetti), her hair loose about her shoulders, with the gem–set gold circlet on her head. It was traditional for queens consort and queens regnant including Elizabeth I and Mary I to wear their hair loose at their coronation.

To orchestrate the costumes of the earls and countesses, the Earl of Nottingham and the Special Commissioners for the Coronation had sent directions on 7 July and the royal wardrobe issued the scarlet fabric. Gold coronets for the Earl and Countess of Shrewsbury cost £50. The Earl of Shrewsbury, as holder of the manor of Farnham Royal, had the honour to support the king's right arm during the procession.

Portraits of countesses in their ermine gowns show two styles of skirt. Lucy, Countess of Bedford, in her portrait now at Gripsholm Castle, wears an older conical French–style farthingale, while the pictures of the Countess of Northampton and another lady show the current fashion of drum or French–wheel farthingales. The costume historian Janet Arnold noted that extensive use of ermine, especially as the forepart of the skirt, echoes the Parliament robes of Elizabeth as depicted on her marble effigy by Maximilian Colt in the Abbey and the countesses' clothes may have resembled those then visible in the Abbey on Elizabeth's wooden funerary effigy.

Buwinckhausen seems to compare the red and white costume of the countesses with the zigzag Franconian Rake

Buwinckhausen wrote that the countesses wore scarlet dresses in "antique fashion" trimmed with ermine, their coronets in the left hand. "Antique fashion", the phrase used in Brenchley Rye's translation, usually meant classical Roman style, but Giovanni degli Effetti said the gowns were in modern style. Buwinckhausen's original German phrase may refer to the countess' wide sleeves having some similarity to Franconian fashion, or to their paired costumes resembling the red and white heraldry of Franconia; "mit Hermelin gefuttert, und weiten Ermelen gar altfrenckisch".

Lady Anne Clifford's parents attended in their robes as Earl of Countess of Cumberland. They had hosted the King and Queen at Grafton Regis in June. At this time the Countess of Cumberland was estranged from the Earl and he was not maintaining her. She had to write to Sir Robert Cecil asking for his intervention so that she could buy suitable clothes to "furnish her self" to attend Queen Anne. Anne Clifford's cousin Frances Bourchier (1587–1612) was a spectator at the coronation, but Anne herself was not allowed to attend for fear of the plague in the city. She remained at Norbury, south of London. In September, Frances Bourchier joined the royal couple's daughter Elizabeth at Nonsuch Palace.

=== Progresses ===
After the ceremony, the royals went to Westminster Palace, and on the following day, to Hampton Court. After a stay at Richmond Palace, they went Woodstock Palace in Oxfordshire. The court then travelled west to Winchester and Wilton House, to avoid the continuing plague in London. The July St James Fair and the August Bartholomew Fair in London were cancelled.

=== Prisons and pardons ===
When James entered the Tower of London on 11 May, prisoners were released including some Jesuits. It was expected that King James would order the release of some prisoners in London jails as a token of his clemency on his coronation day. A prisoner at Newgate wrote that the pardon had not been received on 25 July and might not be extended to Catholic prisoners. Prisoners in the common gaol at Newgate were dying of plague.

== Royal Entry to London and accession day ==
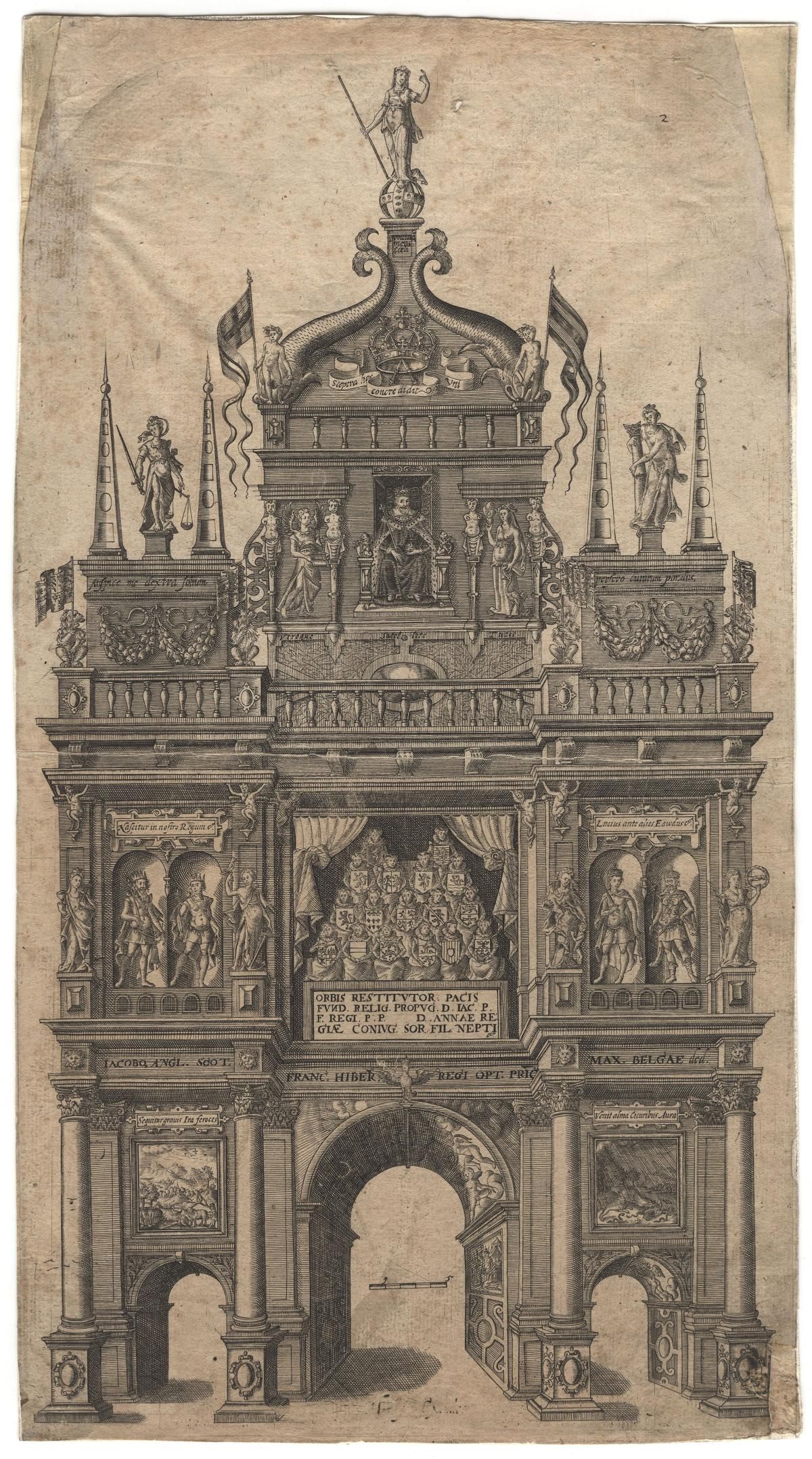
A number of temporary triumphal arches were erected in the City of London for the Royal Entry; this is "the Pegme of the Dutchmen", erected by Dutch traders at the Royal Exchange.

Some preparations for the coronation were built by the carpenter William Portington, and painted by Leonard Fryer. Triumphal arches and pageants were erected in London for the coronation, and for the royal entry which was deferred to 15 March 1604 because of the plague. John Chamberlain described them under construction in July 1603, and their flimsy nature, "Our pageants are prettily forward, but most of them are such small-timbered gentlemen that they cannot last long, and I doubt not if the plague cease not the sooner they will rot and sink where they stand".

According to a publication describing and illustrating the Dutch arch, Adrian Vanson, who had worked for King James in Scotland, was one of the team of painters and artisans recruited to finish the work. The arch included large painted vignettes and a depiction of King James enthroned. The biblical kings David and Josiah were paired with Lucius, a legendary Christian king of England, and Edward VI, a Protestant king who had supported the London Dutch Church. The city of London spent at least £4,100 and city companies made contributions, providing stands for their members and banners. The total sum spent on the city pageants is comparable with the cost of the coronation robes worn by James and Anne in 1603.

The chariot for Anne of Denmark and two coaches for the ladies of her household were decorated with carving by Robert More and John Banks. The cushions and seats were upholstered with red velvet, dressed with silver, passementerie bought from the king's silkman Roger Montague, and William Cookesbury supplied decorative feathers for panaches.

Several of the triumphal arches were designed by a carpenter Stephen Harrison, and illustrated in a festival book commemorating the Royal entry, engraved by William Kip. Thomas Dekker wrote The Magnificent Entertainment, and collaborated with Ben Jonson to produce on entertainments on the day, including The Coronation Triumph. According to Dekker, "the streets seemed to be paved with men; stalls instead of rich wares were set out with children; open casements filled up with women".

The Entry was described by the Count of Villamediana, the Spanish ambassador and a Venetian diplomat Nicolò Molin. James, Anne of Denmark, and Prince Henry lodged at the Tower of London. The crowds were entertained by bull-baiting and other sports. On Wednesday 15 April James rode the ceremonial route through the city followed by Henry, then Anne on a throne on a carriage pulled by mules, and Arbella Stuart in another carriage. Anne of Denmark's apparent interest in the crowds, "bending her body this way and that", was appreciated as a token of accessibility and humility, while James expressed impatience with the unceasing curiosity of the people. Villamediana noted that the procession halted where his party was seated, and Anna of Denmark rose from her seat and kissed hands.

Dekker's poem Troynovant invoked a legend of London as a new Troy or Trinovantum, founded by Brutus, with imagery of James' accession to four kingdoms as a marriage:

Where four great Kingdoms hold a festival.
Troynovant is now a bridal chamber,
Whose roof is gold, floor is of amber,
By virtue of that holy light,
That burns in Hymen's hand, more bright.

A few days later, Parliament was opened with another ceremony, and attendees wore different livery clothes to those at the Entry. James and Henry's Parliament robes were of crimson velvet lined with ermine. There were jousts on Saturday 24 March, celebrated as the king's accession day.
