= Royal entry =

Ceremonies accompanying a formal entry by a ruler into a city

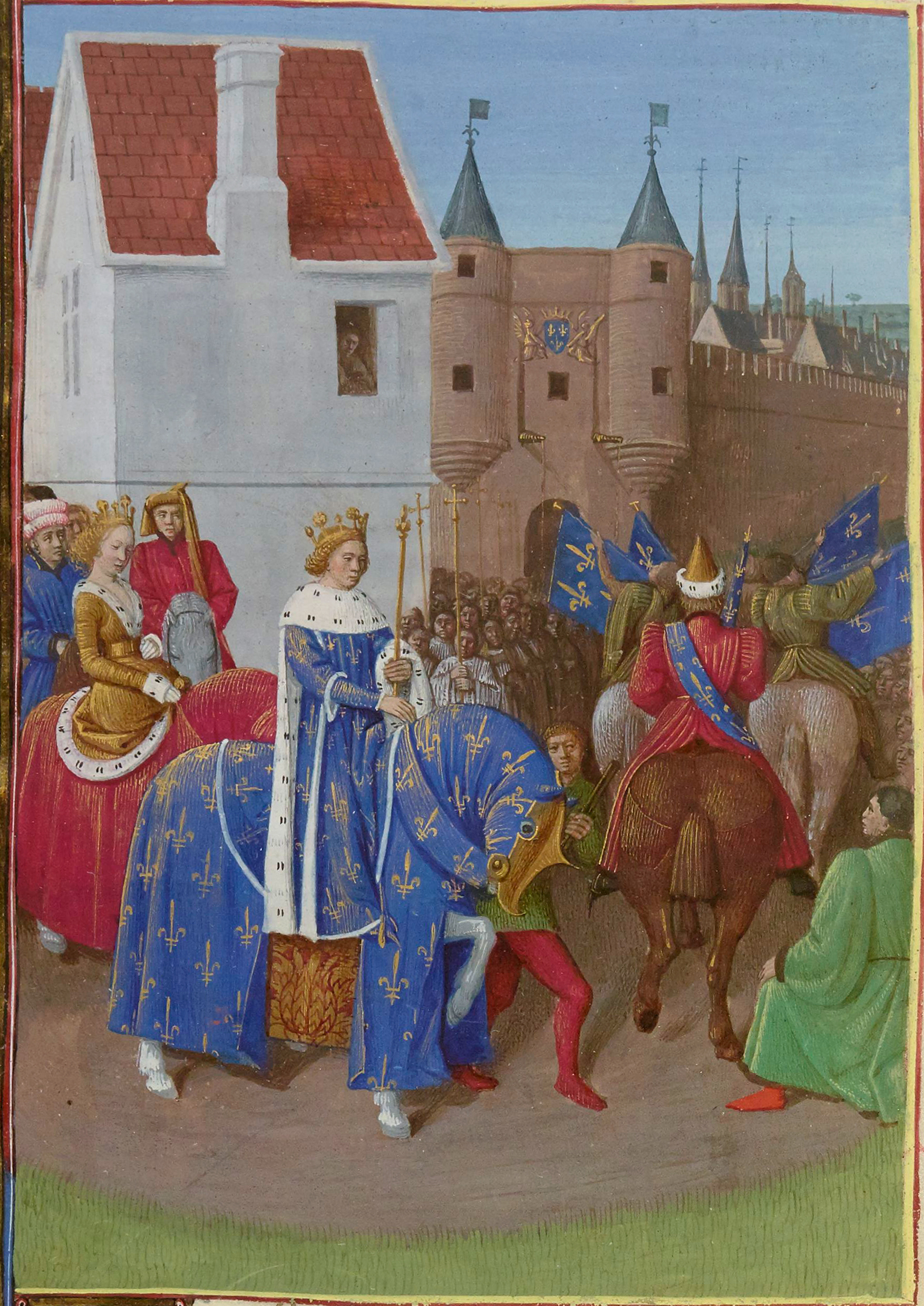
Entry of John II of France and Joan I of Auvergne into Paris after their coronation at Reims in 1350, later manuscript illumination by Jean Fouquet

The ceremonies and festivities accompanying a formal entry by a ruler or their representative into a city in the Middle Ages and early modern period in Europe were known as the royal entry, triumphal entry, or Joyous Entry. The entry centred on a procession carrying the entering ruler into the city, where they were greeted and paid appropriate homage by the civic authorities, followed by a feast and other celebrations.

The entry began as a gesture of loyalty and fealty by a city to the ruler, with its origins in the adventus celebrated for Roman emperors, which were formal entries far more frequent than triumphs. The first visit by a new ruler was normally the occasion, or the first visit with a new spouse. For the capital they often merged with the coronation festivities, and for provincial cities they replaced it, sometimes as part of a Royal Progress, or tour of major cities in a realm. The concept of itinerant court is related to this.

From the Late Middle Ages, entries became the occasion for increasingly lavish displays of pageantry and propaganda. The devising of the iconography, aside from highly conventional patterns into which it quickly settled, was managed with scrupulous care on the part of the welcoming city by municipal leaders in collaboration with the chapter of the cathedral, the university, or hired specialists. Often the greatest artists, writers and composers of the period were involved in the creation of temporary decorations, of which little record now survives, at least from the early period.

== Origins and development ==
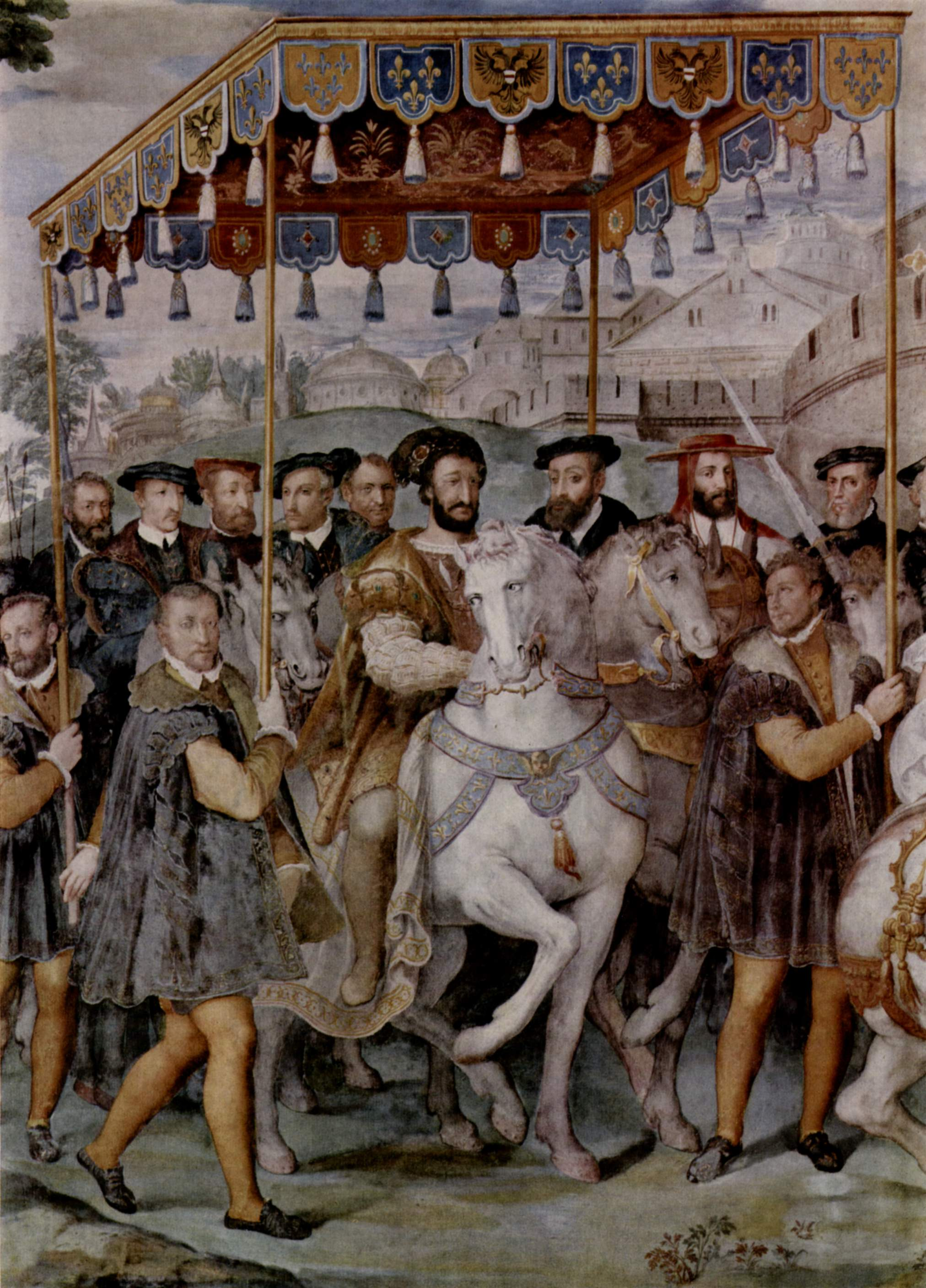
King Francis I of France, Charles V, and Cardinal Alessandro Farnese enter Paris under a canopy of estate in 1540, in a fresco by Taddeo Zuccari.

The contemporary account from Galbert of Bruges of the unadorned "Joyous Advent" of a newly installed Count of Flanders into "his" city of Bruges, in April 1127, shows that in the initial stage, undisguised by fawning and triumphalist imagery that came to disguise it, an entry was similar to a parley, a formal truce between the rival powers of territorial magnate and walled city, in which reiteration of the city's "liberties" in the medieval sense, that is its rights and prerogatives, were set out in clear terms and legitimated by the presence of saintly relics:

"On April 5... at twilight, the king with the newly elected Count William, marquis of Flanders, came into our town at Bruges. The canons of Saint Donatian had come forth to meet them, bearing relics of the saints and welcoming the king and new count joyfully in a solemn procession worthy of a king. On April 6... the king and count assembled with their knights and ours, with the citizens and many Flemings in the usual field where reliquaries and relics of the saints had been collected. And when silence had been called for, the charter of the liberty of the church and of the privileges of Saint Donatian was read aloud before all... There was also read the little charter of agreement between the count and our citizens... Binding themselves to accept this condition, the king and count took an oath on the relics of saints in the hearing of the clergy and people".

In England, the first pre-coronation royal entry was staged in 1377 for the 10 year-old Richard II, and fulfilled the dual purpose of enhancing the image of the boy-king and reconciling the crown with the economically powerful City of London. The grand cavalcade through the streets was accompanied by the public conduits running with wine and a featured large temporary castle representing New Jerusalem. The success of the event set a precedent that was to continue at English coronations until well into the 17th-century.

The procession of a new pope to Rome was known as a possesso. A ruler with a new spouse would also receive an entry. The entry of Queen Isabeau of Bavaria into Paris in 1389 was described by the chronicler Froissart. The entries of Charles IX of France and his Habsburg queen, Elizabeth of Austria, into Paris, March 1571, had been scheduled for Charles alone in 1561, for the entrate were typically celebrated towards the beginning of a reign, but the French Wars of Religion had made such festivities inappropriate, until the peace that followed the Peace of Saint-Germain-en-Laye signed in August 1570.

Until the mid-14th century, the occasions were relatively simple. The city authorities waited for the prince and his party outside the city walls, and after handing over a ceremonial key with a "loyal address" or speech, and perhaps stopping to admire tableaux vivants such as those that were performed at the entry into Paris of Queen Isabeau of Bavaria, described in detail by the chronicler Froissart, conducted him through the streets which were transformed with colour, with houses on the route hanging tapestries and embroideries or carpets or bolts of cloth from their windows, and with most of the population lining the route. At Valladolid in 1509

the town was so gay, so decked out in wealth and canopies and luxurious carpets, that not even Florence or Venice could match it. All the beautiful ladies were delighted to be on display and were definitely worth seeing, [and] everything was so brilliantly arrayed, that I, who am of the town and have never left it, could not recognize it.

Heraldic displays were ubiquitous: at Valladolid in 1509, the bulls in the fields outside the city were caparisoned with cloths painted with the royal arms and hung with bells. Along the route the procession would repeatedly halt to admire the set-pieces embellished with mottoes and pictured and living allegories, accompanied by declamations and the blare of trumpets and volleys of artillery. The procession would include members of the three Estates, with the nobility and gentry of the surrounding area, and the clergy and guilds of the city processing behind the prince. From the mid-14th century the guild members often wore special uniform clothes, each guild choosing a bright colour; in Tournai in 1464 three hundred men wore large embroidered silk fleur de lys (the royal badge) on their chests and backs, at their own expense. The prince reciprocated by confirming, and sometimes extending, the customary privileges of the city or a local area of which it was the capital. Usually the prince also visited the cathedral to be received by the bishop and confirm the privileges of the cathedral chapter also. There a Te Deum would be customary, and music written for the occasion would be performed.

=== Increasing elaboration ===
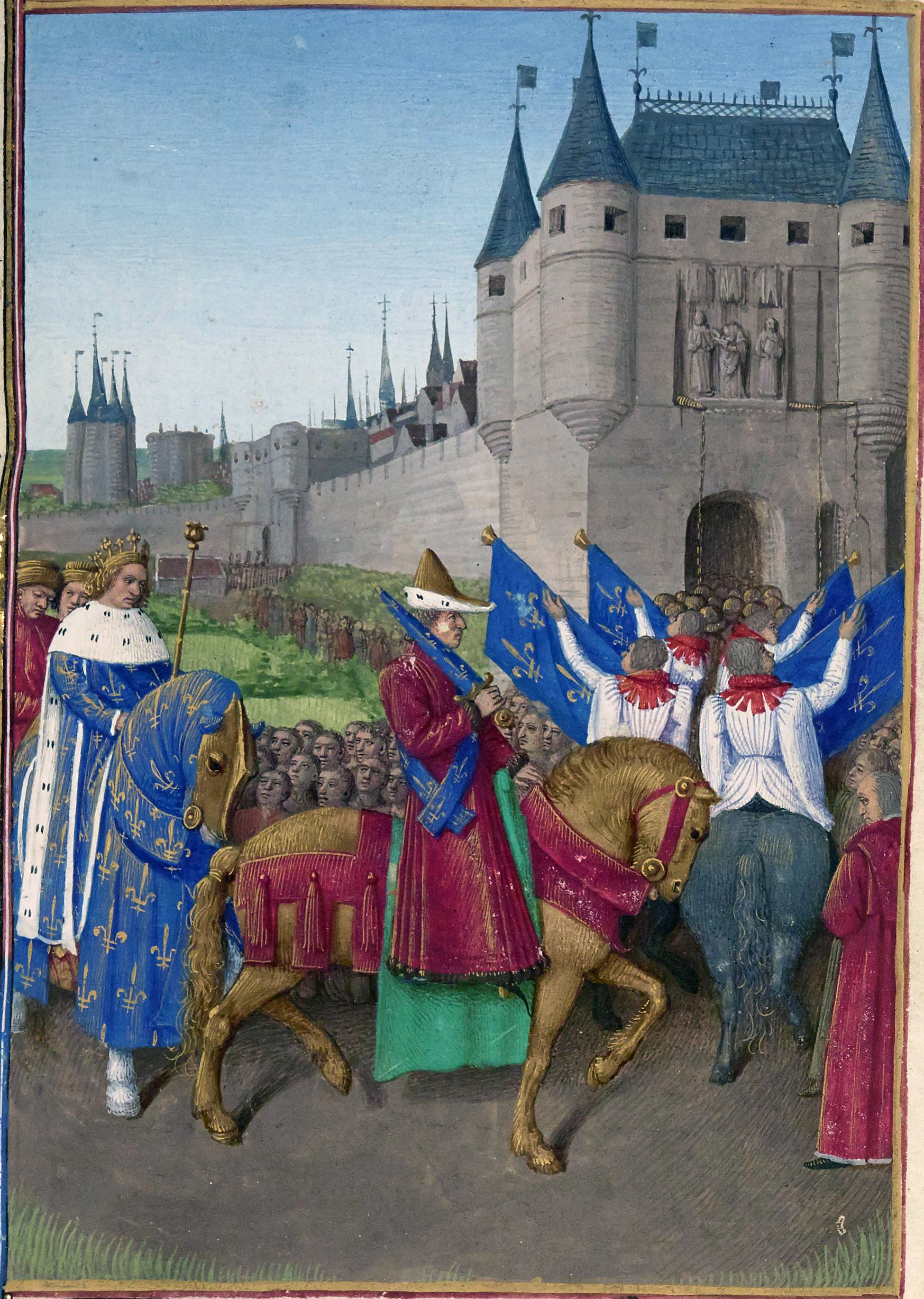
Charles V of France enters Paris after his coronation at Rheims in 1364. Later depiction by Jean Fouquet.

During the 14th century, as courtly culture, with the court of Burgundy in the lead, began to stage elaborate dramas re-enacting battles or legends as entertainment during feasts, the cities began to include in entry ceremonies small staged pageant "tableaux", usually organised by the guilds (and any communities of foreign merchants resident), and drawing on their growing experience of medieval theatre and pageantry. Initially these were on religious themes, but "gradually these tableaux developed, through the fifteenth and into the sixteenth century, into a repertory of archways and street-theatres which presented variants of a remarkably consistent visual and iconographical vocabulary." Fortune with her wheel, fame and time, the seven virtues, both Christian and classical, and the Nine Worthies and other classical, biblical and local heroes, among whose number the honoree was now to be counted. As the tradition developed, the themes became more specific, firstly stressing the legitimacy of the prince, and his claim by descent, then setting before him the princely virtues and their rewards, which especially included the benefits to him of encouraging prosperous cities and provinces.

The procession might pause for allegorical figures to address it, or pass beside a genealogical tree or under a temporary classical-style triumphal arch with either painted figures or posed actors perching on it, standing in for statuary in the case of arches. Still more elaborate entertainments began to be staged during or after the civic feast, and by the mid-17th century these could be as spectacular as the staged naval battles, masques, operas and ballets that courts staged for themselves. The court now often had a major role in both designing and financing entries, which increasingly devoted themselves to the glorification of the absolute monarch as hero, and left the old emphasis on his obligations behind; "any lingering possibilities of its use as a vehicle for dialogue with the middle classes vanished". At the third "triumph" at Valladolid in 1509, a lion holding the city's coat-of-arms shattered at the King's arrival, revealing the royal arms: the significance could not have been lost, even on those unable to hear the accompanying declamation.

During the 16th century, at dates differing widely by location, the tableau vivant was phased out and mostly replaced by painted or sculpted images, although many elements of street-theatre persisted, and small masques or other displays became incorporated into the programmes. The entry in 1514 of Mary Tudor to Paris, as Louis XII's new Queen, was the first French entry to have a single organizer; ten years before Anne of Brittany's entry had been "largely medieval", with five stops for mystery plays in the streets.

During the Hundred Years' War, the entry of the ten-year-old Henry VI of England, to be crowned king of France in Paris, 2 December 1431, was marked with great pomp and heraldic propaganda. Outside the city he was welcomed by the mayor in a blue velvet houppelande, his retinue in violet with scarlet caps, and representatives of the Parlement of Paris in red trimmed with fur. At the porte Saint-Denis the royal party were greeted with a grand achievement of the French arms that Henry claimed, gold fleurs de lis on an azure ground. The king was offered large red hearts, from which doves were released, and a rain of flowers pelted the procession. At the symbolic gateway, a canopy of estate embroidered with more gold lilies was erected over the young king, who was carried in a litter supported on six lances carried by men dressed in blue. Through the city there were welcoming pageants and allegorical performances: before the Church of the Innocents, a forest was erected, through which a captured stag was released and "hunted".

=== Classical influence ===
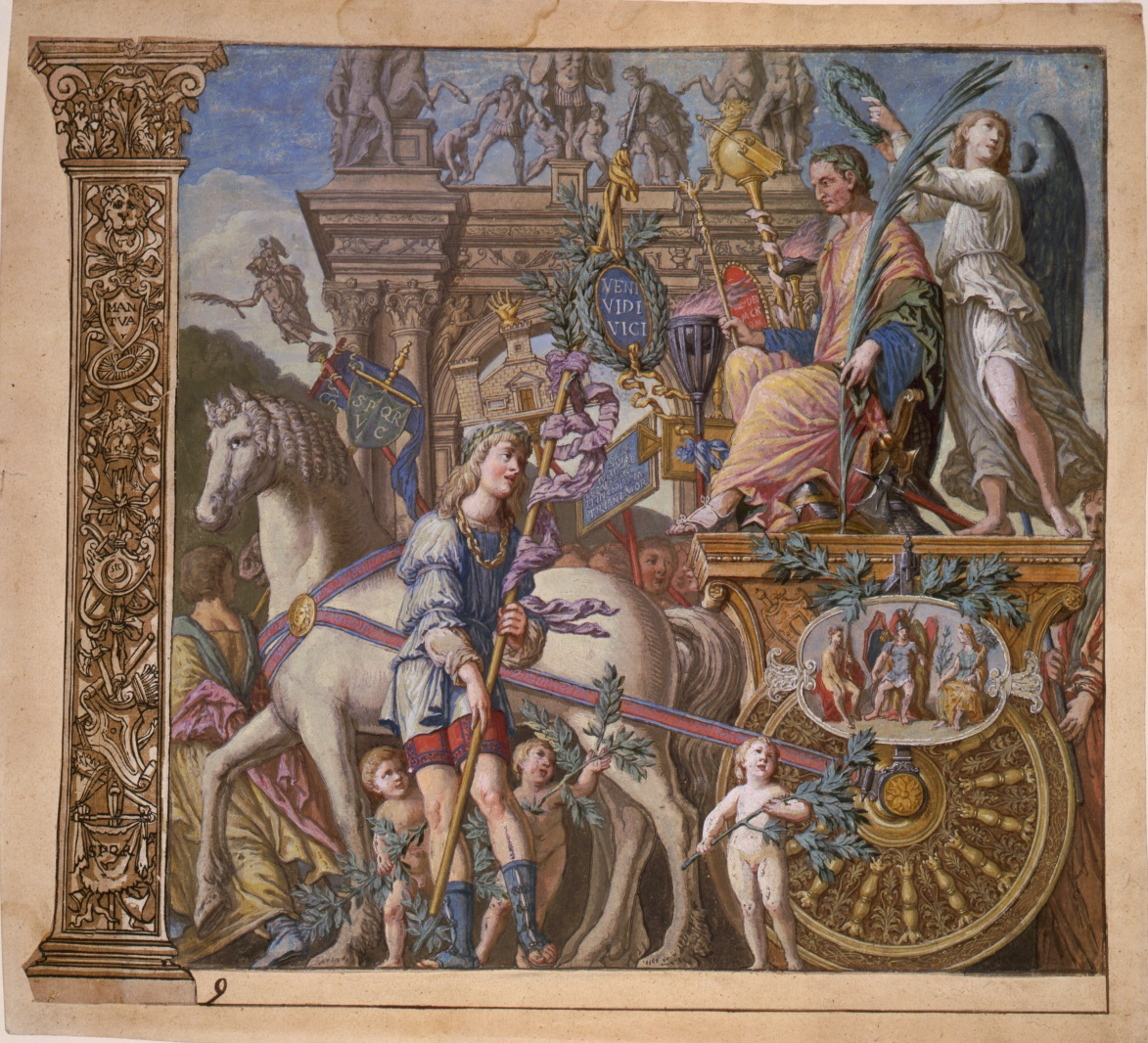
Later woodcut after Mantegna, with hand-colouring, showing the culmination of the Triumphs of Caesar.

Educated folk of the Middle Ages had close at hand an example of an allegorical series of entries at a wedding, in the frame story that opens Martianus Capella's encyclopedic introduction to all one needed to know of the arts, On the Wedding of Philology and Mercury and of the Seven Liberal Arts. With the revival of classical learning, Italian entries became influenced by literary descriptions of the Roman triumph. Livy's account was supplemented by detailed descriptions in Suetonius and Cassius Dio of Nero's Greek Triumph, and in Josephus of the Triumph of Titus.

More recherché sources were brought to bear; Aulus Gellius' Noctes Atticae furnished a detail that became part of the conventional symbolism: coronation with seven crowns. Boccaccio's long poem Amorosa visione (1342–43), following the schema of a triumph, offered a parade of famous personages, both historical and legendary, that may have provided a model for Petrarch, who elaborated upon Livy in an account of the triumph of Scipio Africanus and in his poem I Trionfi. Castruccio Castracani entered Lucca in 1326 riding in a chariot, with prisoners driven before him. Alfonso V of Aragon entered Naples in 1443 seated on a triumphal car under a baldachin, as is shown by a surviving bas-relief on the earliest, and still perhaps the most beautiful, permanent post-classical triumphal arch, which he built the same year. In Italian, specific meanings developed for trionfo as both the whole procession, and a particular car or cart decorated with a display or tableau; although these usages did not spread exactly to other languages, they lie behind terms such as "triumphal entry" and "triumphal procession".

The emphasis began to shift from the displays as static tableaux that were passed by a procession in festive but normal contemporary dress, to the displays' being incorporated in the procession itself, a feature also of the religious medieval pageant; the tableaux were mounted on carri, the precursors of the float, and were now often accompanied by a costumed throng. The carnival parades of Florence that were refined to a high pitch in the late quattrocento set a high standard; they were not without a propaganda element at times, as in the lavish parades of Carnival 1513, following the not-universally welcomed return of the Medici the previous year; the theme of one pageant, more direct than subtle: The Return of the Golden Age. With the French invasions of Italy from 1494, this form of entry spread north. Cardinal Bibbiena reported in a letter of 1520 that the Duke of Suffolk had sent emissaries to Italy to buy horses and bring back to Henry VIII of England men who knew how to make festal decorations in the latest Italian manner.

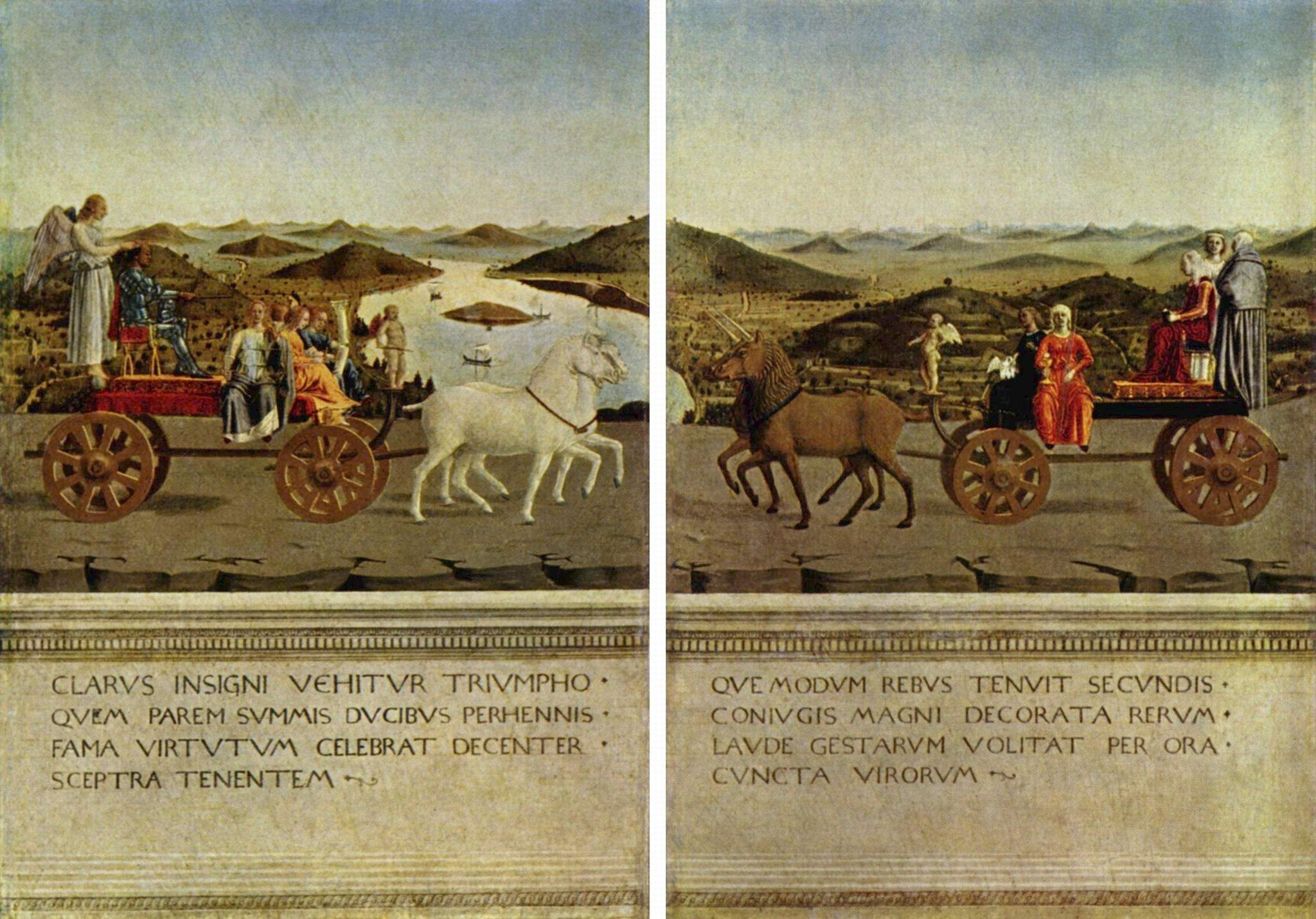
Piero della Francesca, 1472, Federico da Montefeltro and his wife in triumphal cars, hers drawn by unicorns.

Charles V was indulged in a series of Imperial entrate in Italian cities during the Habsburg consolidation after the Sack of Rome, notably in Genoa, where Charles and his heir Philip made no less than five triumphal entries. Impressive occasions like Charles V's royal entry into Messina in 1535 have left few concrete survivals, but representations were still being painted on Sicilian wedding-carts in the 19th century.

After Mantegna's great mural of the Triumphs of Caesar rapidly became known throughout Europe in numerous versions in print form, this became the standard source, from which details were frequently borrowed, not least by Habsburg rulers, who especially claimed the Imperial legacy of Rome. Although Mantegna's elephants were difficult to copy, chained captives, real or acting the part, were not, and elaborate triumphal carts, often pulled by "unicorns" might replace the earlier canopy held over the prince on horseback. The woodcuts and text of the Hypnerotomachia Poliphili of 1499 were another well-known source, and Petrarch's I Trionfi was printed in many illustrated editions; both were works of mythological allegory, with no obvious political content. Entries became displays of conspicuous learning, often with lengthy Latin addresses, and the entertainments became infused with matter from the abstruse worlds of Renaissance emblems and hermeticism, to which they were very well suited. In the world of Renaissance Neo-Platonism, the assertion and acting-out of the glory and power of the prince might actually bring it about.

A precocious example of the Entrata with a consistent and unified allegorical theme was the entry of Medici Pope Leo X into Florence, November 1515. All the city's artistic resources were drawn upon to create this exemplary entry, to a planned programme perhaps devised by the historian Jacopo Nardi, as Vasari suggested; the seven virtues represented by seven triumphal arches at stations along the route, the seventh applied as a temporary façade to the Duomo, Santa Maria del Fiore, which still lacked a permanent one.

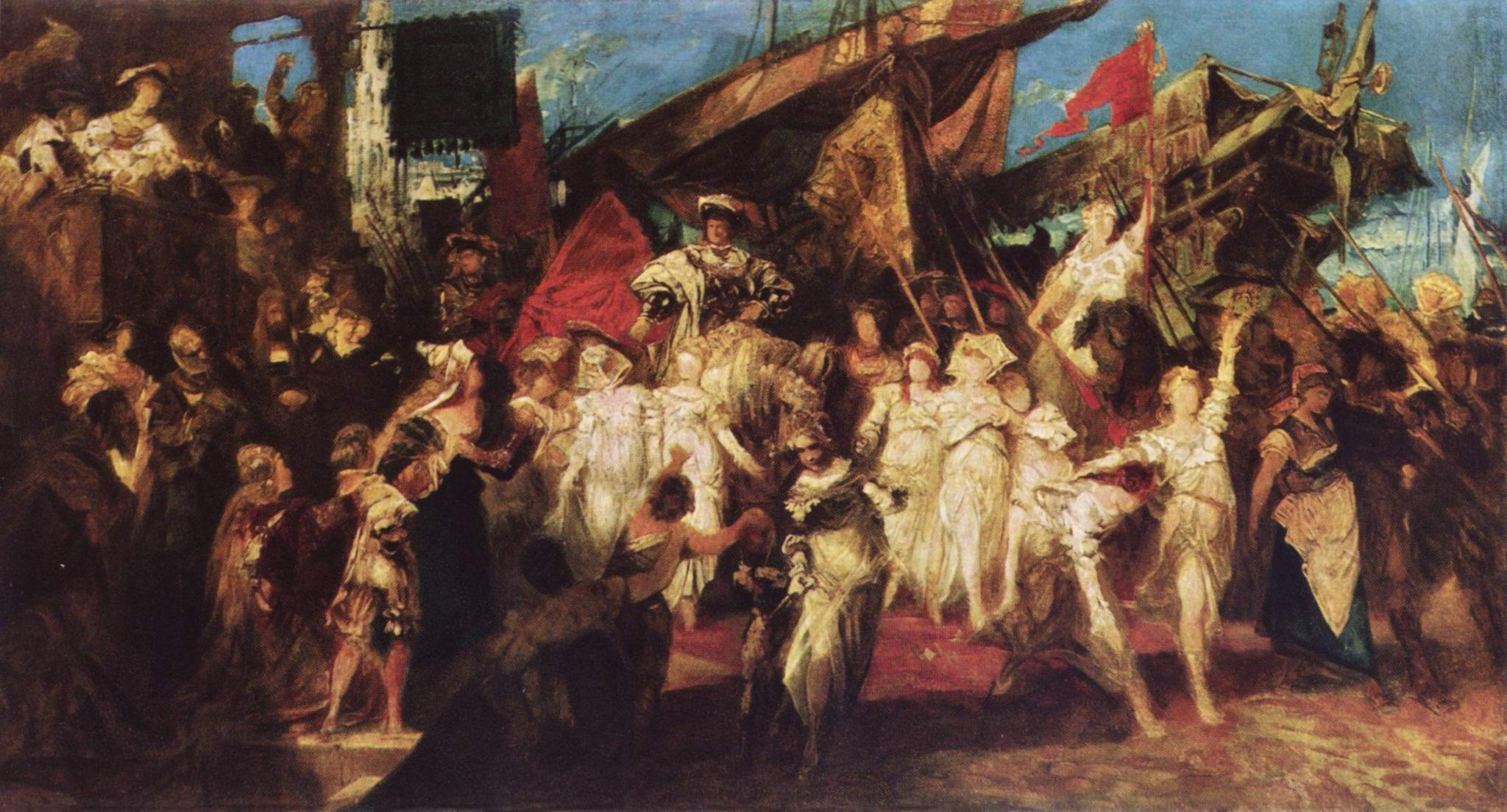
19th century oil sketch of Charles V entering Antwerp (in ?1515)

=== Propaganda ===
Apart from the permanent theme of the reciprocal bonds uniting ruler and ruled, in times of political tension the political messages in entries became more pointed and emphatic. A disputed succession would produce a greater stress on the theme of legitimacy. After the Reformation, tension became a permanent condition, and most entries contained a sectarian element. After about 1540 French entries and Habsburg ones in the Low Countries were especially freighted with implication, as the rulers' attempts to suppress Protestantism brought Protestant and Catholic populations alike to the edge of ruin. But initially this increased the scale of displays, whose message was now carefully controlled by the court.

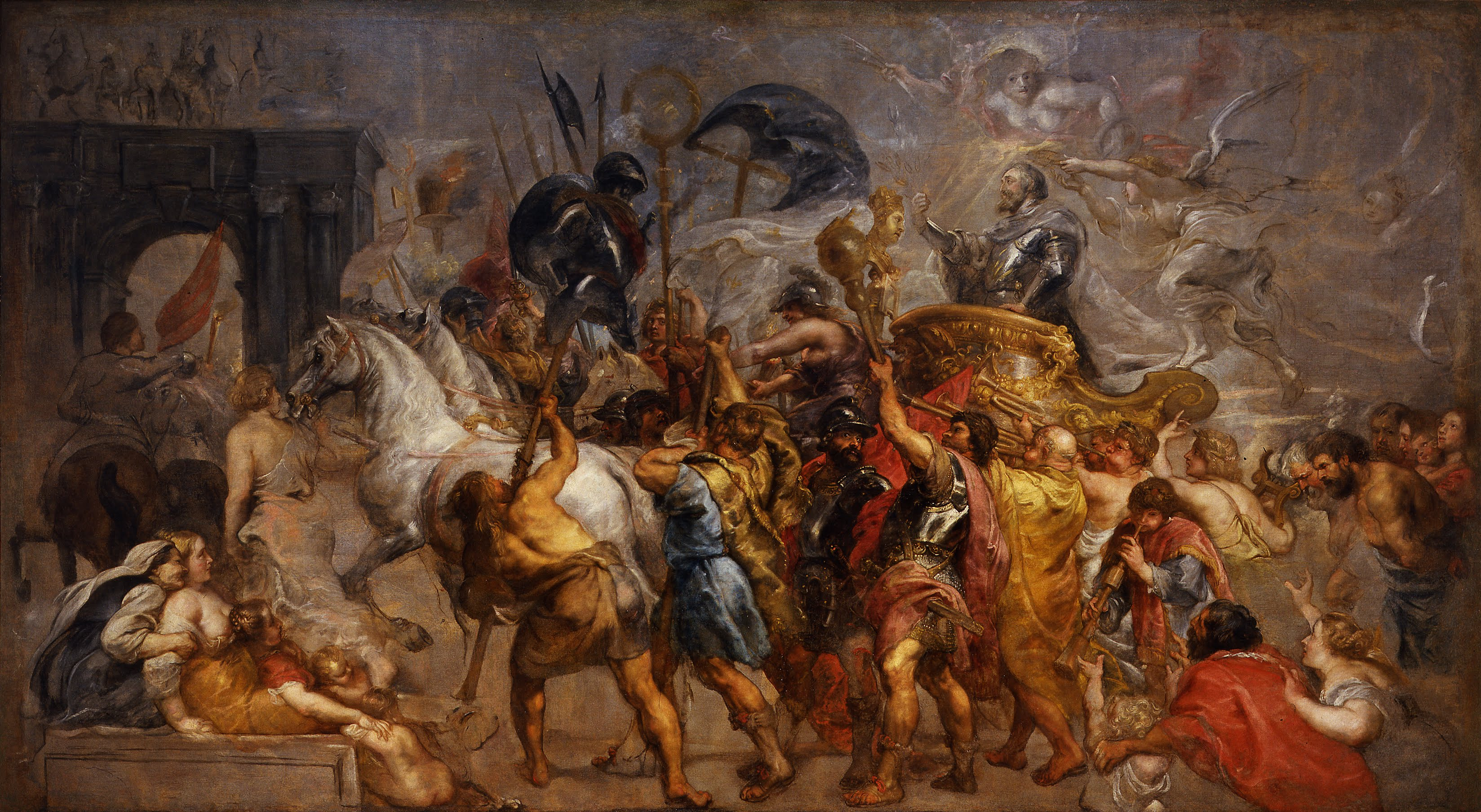
Entry of Henry IV into Paris, by Rubens, 1628–30: an unfinished Baroque figuration of the allegory itself.

This transformation happened much earlier in Italy than in the North, and a succession of entries for Spanish Viceroys to the blockaded city of Antwerp, once the richest in Northern Europe and now in steep decline, were "used by the city fathers to combine increasingly eulogistic celebrations of their Habsburg rulers with tableaux to remind them of the commercial ruin over which they presided." The Pompa Introitus of the Cardinal-Infante Ferdinand into Antwerp in 1635, devised by Gaspar Gevartius and carried out under the direction of Rubens, was made unmistakably pointed, and included a representation of the god of commerce, Mercury, flying away, as a lamenting figure representing Antwerp points at him and looks imploringly out at the Viceroy, whilst beside her lie a sleeping sailor and a river god, representing the wrecked trade of the city from the blockading of the river Scheldt. Eventually the Viceroy managed to obtain the lifting of the ban on trade with the Indies which the entry had represented as Antwerp's only hope of escaping ruin; but by then the Spanish had agreed to the permanent blockade of the river.

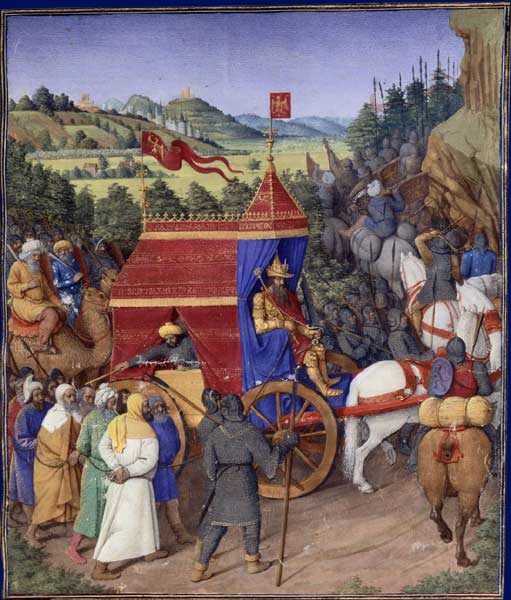
Triumph of Jehoshaphat, Jean Fouquet, 1470–75.

In 1638, the occasion of the French queen mother Marie de Medici's triumphal entry into Amsterdam lent de facto international recognition of the newly formed Dutch Republic, though she actually traveled to the Netherlands as an exile. Spectacular displays and water pageants took place in the city's harbor; a procession was led by two mounted trumpeters; a large temporary structure erected on an artificial island in the Amstel River was built especially for the festival. This building was designed to display a series of dramatic tableaux in tribute to her once she set foot on the floating island and entered its pavilion. The distinguished poet and classicist Caspar Barlaeus wrote the official descriptive booklet, Medicea Hospes, sive descriptio publicae gratulationis, qua ... Mariam de Medicis, excepit senatus populusque Amstelodamensis. Published by Willem Blaeu, it includes two large folding engraved views of the ceremonies.

=== Peace and war ===
Although the essence of an entry was that it was supposed to be a peaceful, festive occasion, very different from the taking of a town by assault, several entries actually followed military action by the town against their ruler, and were very tense affairs. In 1507 the population of Genoa revolted against the French who had conquered them in 1499, and restored their Republic. Louis XII of France defeated the Genoan army outside the city, which then agreed a capitulation, including an entry which was followed by the execution of the Doge and other leaders of the revolt. The gestural content was rather different from a peaceful entry; Louis entered in full armour, holding a naked sword, which he struck against the portal as he entered the city, saying "Proud Genoa! I have won you with my sword in my hand".

Charles V entered Rome in splendour less than three years after his army had sacked the city. The famously troublesome citizens of Ghent revolted against Philip the Good in 1453 and Charles V in 1539, after which Charles arrived with a large army and was greeted with an entry. A few weeks later he dictated the programme of a deliberately humiliating anti-festival, with the burghers coming barefoot with nooses round their necks to beg forgiveness from him which, after imposing a huge fine, he consented to do. The entries of Charles and his son Philip in 1549 were followed the next year by a ferocious anti-Protestant edict that began the repression that led to the Revolt of the Netherlands, in the course of which Antwerp was to suffer a terrible sack in 1576 and a long siege in 1584–85, which finally ended all prosperity in the city.

=== Decline ===
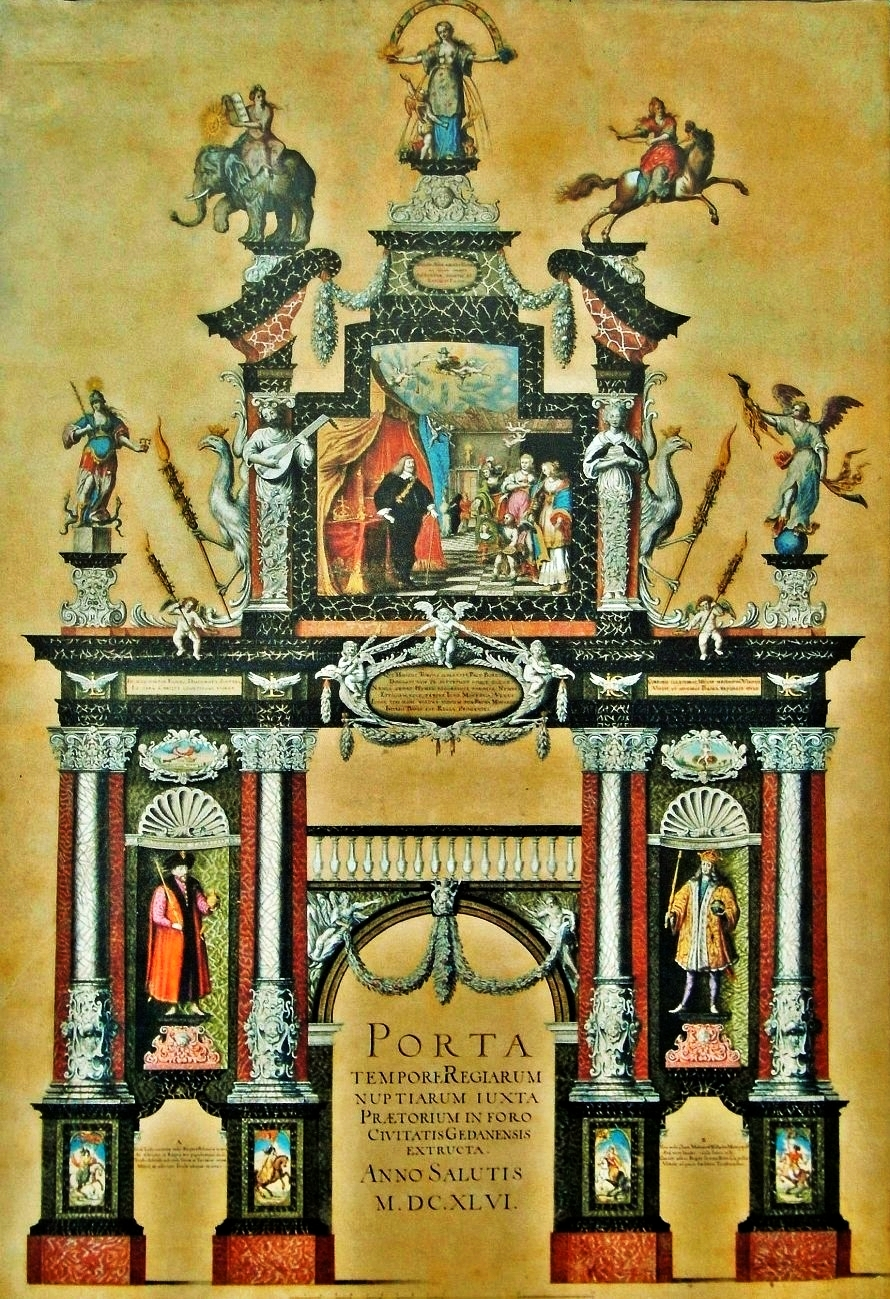
Temporary triumphal arch in Gdańsk to celebrate the ceremonial entry of Queen Marie Louise Gonzaga, 1646

During the 17th century the scale of entries began to decline. There was a clear trend, led from Medici Florence, to transfer festivities involving the monarch into the private world of the court. The intermezzi developed in Florence, the ballet de cour that spread from Paris, the English masque, and even elaborate equestrian ballets all increased as entries declined. In 1628, when Marie de' Medici commissioned from Rubens a Triumphal Entry of Henri IV into Paris, it was for a suite of grand decorations for her own palace, the Luxembourg; Rubens did not recreate historic details of the 1594 royal entry, but overleapt them to render the allegory itself (illustration).

The cultural atmosphere of Protestantism was less favourable to the royal entry. In the new Dutch Republic entries ceased altogether. In England, part of the Accession Day festivities in 1588, following the defeat of the Spanish Armada were especially joyous and solemn. Delaying the event a week to 24 November, Elizabeth rode in triumph, "imitating the ancient Romans" from her palace of Whitehall in the city of Westminster to enter the city of London at Temple Bar. She rode in a chariot

"made with four pillars behind, to have a canopie, on the top whereof was made a crowne imperiall, and two lower pillars before. whereon stood a lyon and a dragon, supporters of the armes of England, drawn by two white horses"

The Earl of Essex followed the triumphal car, leading the caparisoned and riderless horse of estate, followed by the ladies of honour. The windows of houses along the procession route up the Strand were hung with blue cloth. At Temple Bar, the official gate to the City, there was music and the Lord Mayor handed over the mace and received it again. In a "closet" constructed for the occasion, the Queen heard a festive service celebrated by fifty clergymen at St. Paul's Cathedral and returned in a torchlit procession in the evening.

Nevertheless, the entry of James I into London in 1604 was the last until the Restoration of his grandson in 1660, after the English Civil War. The court of Charles I intensified the scale of private masques and other entertainments, but the cities, increasingly at odds with the monarchy, would no longer play along. The Duchy of Lorraine, a great centre of all festivities, was swallowed up in the Thirty Years War, which left much of Northern and Central Europe in no mood or condition for celebrations on the old scale. In France the concentration of power in royal hands, begun by Richelieu, left city elites distrustful of the monarchy, and once Louis XIV succeeded to the throne, royal progresses stopped completely for over fifty years; in their place Louis staged his elaborate court fêtes, redolent of cultural propaganda, which were memorialised in sumptuously illustrated volumes that the Cabinet du Roi placed in all the right hands.

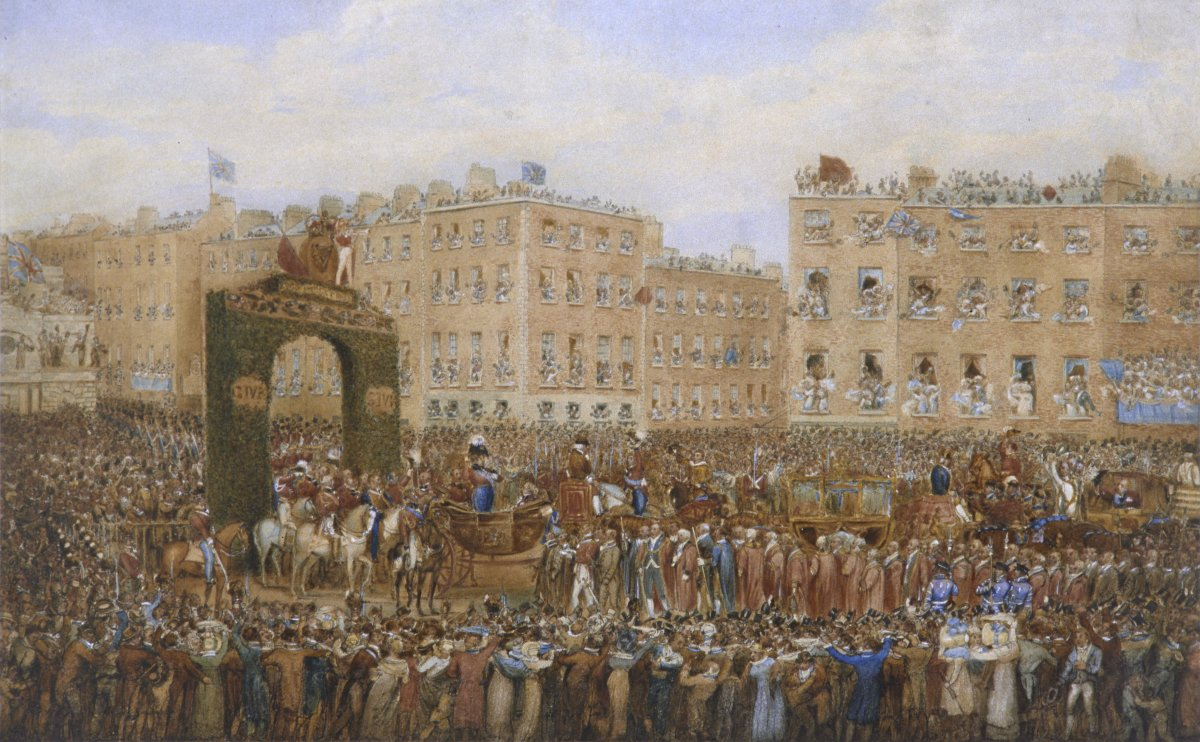
Triumphal entry of George IV of the United Kingdom into Dublin, 1821, with temporary arch

Changes in the intellectual climate meant the old allegories no longer resonated with the population. The assassinations of both Henry III and Henry IV of France, of William the Silent and other prominent figures, and the spread of guns, made rulers more cautious about appearing in slow-moving processions planned and publicised long in advance; at grand occasions for fireworks and illuminations, rulers now characteristically did no more than show themselves at a ceremonial window or balcony. The visit of Louis XVI to inspect the naval harbour works at Cherbourg in 1786 seems, amazingly, to have been the first French entry of a king designed as a public event since the early years of Louis XIV well over a century before. Though considered a great success, this was certainly too little and too late to avoid the catastrophe awaiting the French monarchy.

Ideologues of the French Revolution took the semi-private fête of the former court and made it public once more, in events like the Fête de la Raison. Under Napoleon, the Treaty of Tolentino (1797) requisitioned from the papacy a mass of works of art, including most of the famous sculptures of Roman antiquity in the Vatican. A Joyous Entry under the name of a fête was arranged for the arrival of the cultural loot in Paris, the carefully prepared Fête de la Liberté of 1798. With the increased sense of public security of the 19th century, entries became grander again, on such occasions as the Visit of King George IV to Scotland, where medieval revivalism makes its first appearance, along with much Highland romanticism, Queen Victoria's visits to Dublin and elsewhere, or the three Delhi Durbars. On these occasions, though ceremonial acts remained meaningful, overt allegories never regained the old prominence, and the decorations receded into festive, but simply decorative affairs of flags, flowers and bunting, the last remnant of the medieval show of rich textiles along the processional route.

Today, though many parades and processions have quite separate, independent origins, civic or republican equivalents of the entry continue. They include Victory parades, New York's traditional ticker-tape parades and the Lord Mayor's Show in London, dating back to 1215 and still preserving the Renaissance car, or float model. It is not frivolous to add that the specific occasion of the contemporary American Thanksgiving Day Parade or the Santa Claus parade is the triumphal entry into the city of Santa Claus in his sleigh.

=== Artists ===
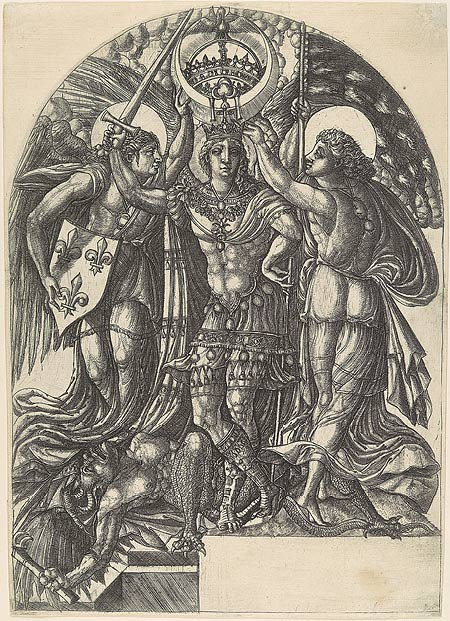
Henry II of France between France and Fame, engraving by Jean Duvet, may reflect a tableau from an occasion such as his entry into Paris, 16 June 1549.

To the occasional irritation of modern art historians, many of the great artists of the time spent a good deal of time on the ephemeral decorations for entries and other festivities, including Jan van Eyck, Leonardo da Vinci, Albrecht Dürer, Holbein, Andrea del Sarto, Perino del Vaga, Polidoro da Caravaggio, Tintoretto, Veronese and Rubens. For some court artists, such as Inigo Jones or Jacques Bellange, it seems to have been their major occupation, and both Giulio Romano and Giorgio Vasari were very heavily engaged in such work. Composers from Lassus and Monteverdi to John Dowland, and writers such as Tasso, Ronsard, Ben Jonson and Dryden also contributed. Shakespeare does not seem to have written anything for such an occasion, but with Jonson he was one of a group of twenty gentlemen processing in The Magnificent Entertainment, as the published record called the first entry of James I of England into London.

Art historians also detect the influence of the tableau in many paintings, especially in the late Middle Ages, before artists had trained themselves to be able to develop new compositions readily. In the Renaissance, artists were often imported from other cities to help with, or supervise, the works, and entries probably helped the dissemination of styles.

=== Festival books ===
A festival book is an account of festivities such as entries, of which there are many hundreds, often surviving in very few copies. Originally manuscripts, often illustrated, compiled for prince or city, with the arrival of print they were frequently published, varying in form from short pamphlets describing the order of events, and perhaps recording speeches, to lavish books illustrated with woodcuts or engravings showing the various tableaux, often including a fold-out panorama of the procession, curling to and fro across the page. The pamphlets were ephemera themselves; a printed description of two leaves describing the entry of Ferdinand into Valladolid, 1513, survives in a single copy (at Harvard) because it was bound with another text. A lost description of the ceremonious reception given by Louis XII to Ferdinand at Savona (June 1507) is only known from a purchase receipt of Ferdinand Columbus.

These livrets are not always to be trusted as literal records; some were compiled beforehand from the plans, and others after the event from fading memories. The authors or artists engaged in producing the books had by no means always seen the entry themselves. Roy Strong finds that they are "an idealization of an event, often quite distant from its reality as experienced by the average onlooker. One of the objects of such publications was to reinforce by means of word and image the central ideas that motivated those who conceived the programme." One Habsburg entry was all but called off because of torrential rain, but the book shows it as it should have been. Thomas Dekker, the playwright and author of the book on The Magnificent Entertainment for James I is refreshingly frank:

Reader, you must understand, that a regard, being had that his Majestie should not be wearied with teadious speeches: A great part of those which are in this Booke set downe, were left unspoken: So that thou doest here receive them as they should have been delivered, not as they were. [sic]

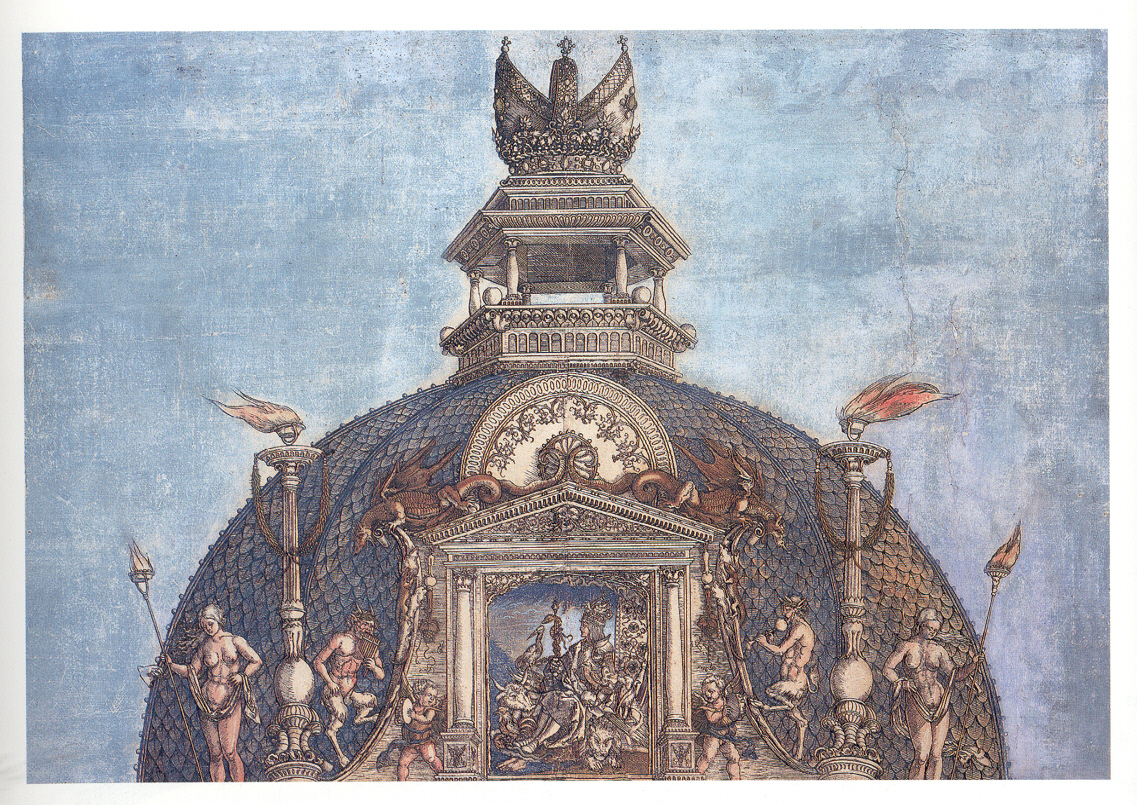
Detail of top (about 1/10 of the height) of the Triumphal Arch of Maximilian, coloured woodcut, overall design by Albrecht Dürer.

The Holy Roman Emperor, Maximilian I, went a step further, commissioning enormous virtual triumphs that existed solely in the form of print. The Triumphs of Maximilian (begun in 1512 and unfinished at Maximilian's death in 1519) contains over 130 large woodcuts by Dürer and other artists, showing a huge procession (still in open country) culminating in the Emperor himself, mounted on a huge car. The Triumphal Arch (1515), the largest print ever made, at 3.57 x 2.95 metres when the 192 sheets are assembled, was produced in an edition of seven hundred copies for distribution to friendly cities and princes. It was intended to be hand-coloured and then pasted to a wall. Traditional tableau themes, including a large genealogy, and many figures of virtues, are complemented by scenes of Maximilian's life and military victories. Maximilian was wary of entries in person, having been locked up by his loyal subjects in Bruges in 1488 for eleven weeks, until he could pay the bills from his stay.

An early meeting between the festival book with travel literature is the account of the visit in 1530 of the future Ferdinand I, Holy Roman Emperor, then King of Hungary and Bohemia to Constantinople.

=== New World entries ===
In Habsburg territories in the New World, the entradas of the Viceroy of Mexico were celebrated at his landing at Veracruz and at Mexico City; on the way, the ceremonial entry at the "second city", Puebla de los Ángeles, which were presented as late as 1696, served to promote an elite that self-identified strongly with Spain, and incurred expenses, which were borrowed from the ecclesiastic cabildo, that exceeded the annual income of the city. Printed commemorative pamphlets spelled out in detail the elaborately artificial allegories and hieroglyphic emblems of the entry, often drawn from astrology, in which the Viceroy would illuminate the city as the sun. In the 18th century, the Bourbon transformation of entrées into semi-private fêtes extended to Spanish Mexico: "While the event continued to be extravagant under Bourbon rule, it became more privatized and took place to a larger degree indoors, losing its street theater flavor and urban processional character."

== Examples of entries ==
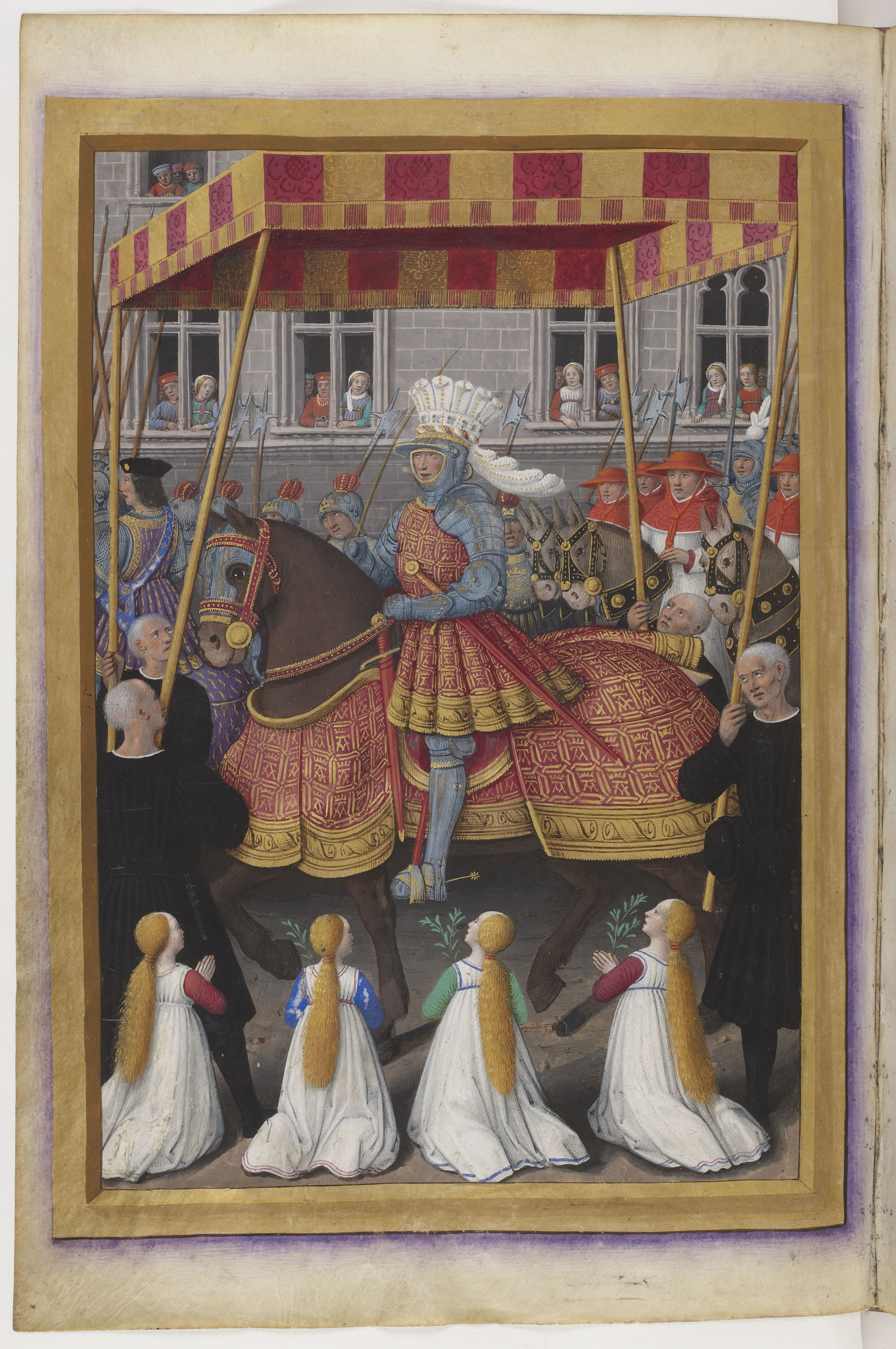
Louis XII of France enters Genoa, 1507, from a manuscript account. The Genoans had revolted against the French and been defeated; many executions followed the entry.

- 1356: the Joyous Entry into Brussels, by Joanna and her husband Wenceslaus I, Duke of Luxembourg, upon her becoming Duchess of Brabant. "Joyous Entry" is a common term for French or Netherlandish entries. This one is famous because the Charter granted by the ruler to the Duchy came to assume a position in the history of the Low Countries similar to that of Magna Carta in England.
- 1431: Henry VI of England returned to London after being crowned King of France in Paris, then occupied by the English, and the arms of both crowns were prominently displayed. Henry, then aged fifteen, was encountered by the "empresses" of "Nature, Grace and Fortune" who bestowed various virtues and talents upon, then by fourteen maidens, representing the Seven Gifts of the Holy Spirit and a further set. After further tableaux, at Cheapside a fountain ran with wine (a particular speciality of London festivities) and large tableaux represented the genealogy of the King, and a complementary Tree of Jesse showing that of Christ. The finale was a huge tableau of Heaven, where God the Father, surrounded by saints and angels, addressed the King.
- 1443: Alfonso V of Aragon's triumphal entry into Naples was "the earliest of the triumphal entries all'antica in Europe" Unlike most lathe-and-plaster painted triumphal arches, its permanent commemoration is the arch before the Castel Nuovo. The event, portraying Alfonso as a classical hero of antiquity, set iconographic examples for his nephew in the royal entries of Ferdinand of Aragon. The published account by Antonio Beccadelli, "Il Panormita", circulated widely.
- 1457: The entry of Philip the Good, Duke of Burgundy, into Ghent
- 1494: For Charles VIII's entry into Florence, which occasioned the temporary eclipse of Piero de' Medici, Filippino Lippi collaborated with Perugino on the decors.
- 1498: Arthur, Prince of Wales, makes an entry to Coventry, welcomed by King Arthur and the Nine Worthies, Queen Fortune, and Saint George.
- 1513: Ferdinand of Aragon's triumphal entry into Valladolid, taking the conquest of Navarre as an occasion for allegorical displays of regal power in "an unusually lavish and explicitly propagandist entry".
- 1515: The triumphal entry of the Medici Pope Leo X into Florence is one of the most thoroughly documented entries, both in official records and private journals— though the visual and musical components are lost— and has attracted a separate monograph, by Ilaria Ciseri. It was produced on a princely scale, catching Leo at the peak of his reputation, en route to a meeting at Bologna with François I, at the head of temporarily victorious forces. Ciseri identifies two likely candidates for the allegorical programme, Jacopo Nardi and Marcello Virgilio Adriani, and a theme that offered parallel evocations of Imperial Rome the heavenly Jerusalem. The unfinished façade of the Duomo was temporarily "completed" in "chiaroscuro" (grisaille) canvases of feigned architecture and sculpture by Andrea del Sarto to designs by Jacopo Sansovino.

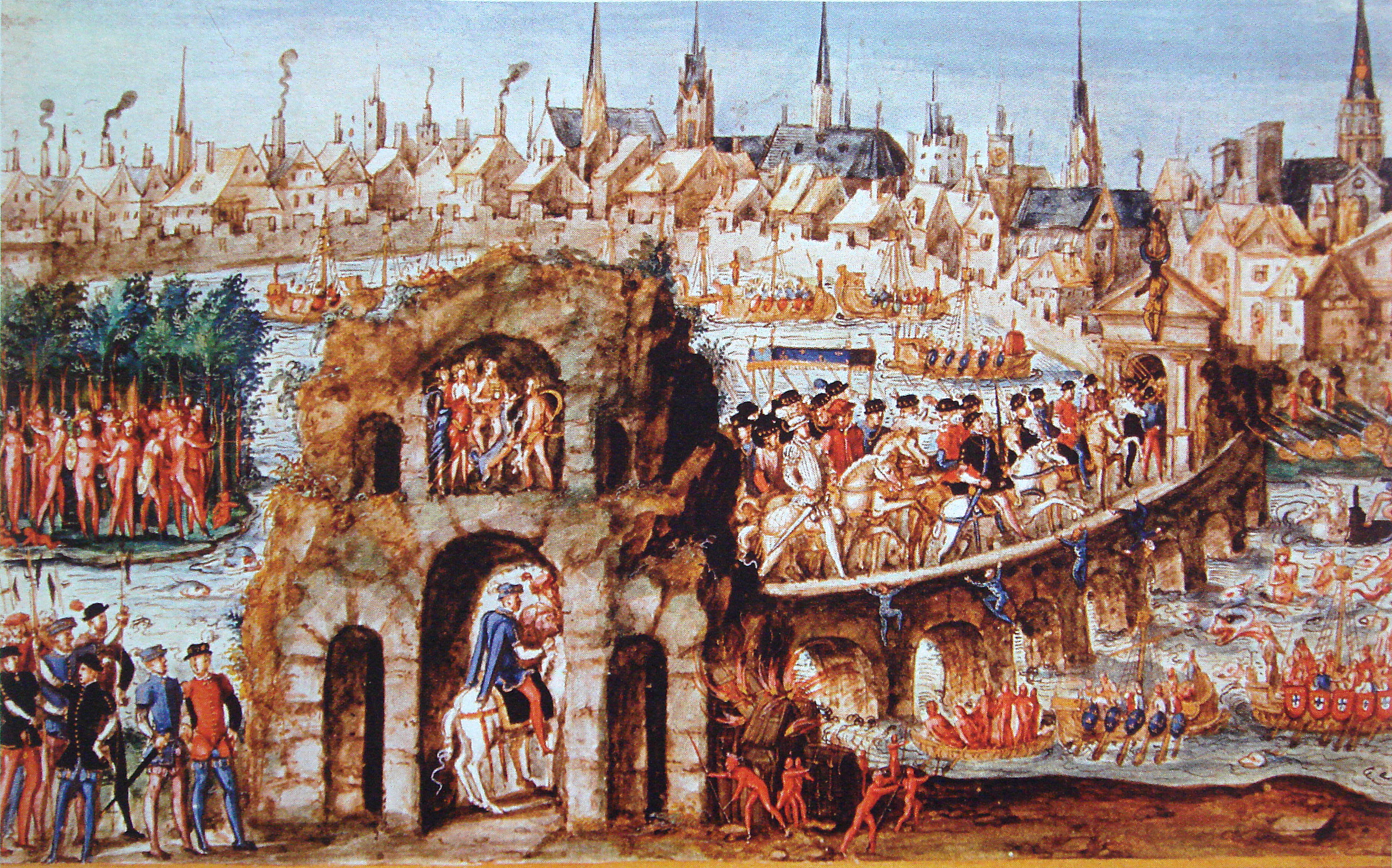
For the entry of Henry II of France to Rouen, 1 October 1550, 30 naked men were employed to illustrate life in Brazil and a battle between the Tupinamba allies of the French, and the Tabajara Indians.

- 1515 and 1535–1536: Charles V was both the most powerful and the most mobile monarch of the Renaissance, and made an unprecedented number of entries. He made a series in his youth, from which the 1515 entry into Bruges is one of the best recorded of the old medieval style, with an unusually well-illustrated Festival Book for the date. In 1533 he was regally entertained in Genoa by Andrea Doria, with a mock battle staged in the harbour. In 1535–36, at the height of his success, he made a progress through Italy, being crowned as Emperor by the Pope in Bologna and visiting the capital of his new Kingdom of Naples.Book His Imperial Entry into Rome, on April 5, 1536, is particularly well documented in contemporary accounts, in Giorgio Vasari's Lives and in surviving drawings; it drew on the imagery of the ancient Roman Triumph. Throughout the tour, he was presented as the heir, and surpasser, of the Roman Emperors, and triumphal arches and Roman imagery abounded.
- 1548–1549: Philip II made a tour as the heir of Charles beginning in Italy, up through Germany, and ending in the Netherlands, entering many cities, often with Charles, with Antwerp as the culmination, shown in a well-illustrated Festival Book, which shows many decorations that were not actually constructed. Apart from very heavy rain, the entry had been designed to celebrate agreement of Philip's succession to the Empire, which the Electors refused. The States (assemblies) of Flanders also made difficulties, and if it was the "most famous entry of the century", this was largely thanks to the book, which was published in three language editions. In charge of the Antwerp decorations was Pieter Coecke van Aelst, whose pupil and future son-in-law Pieter Bruegel the Elder probably worked on them, and whose mature art was to decisively reject the style and substance of such occasions. These were undoubtedly the high-water mark of the sixteenth-century Royal Entry, but with signs of the troubles to come already beginning to show.

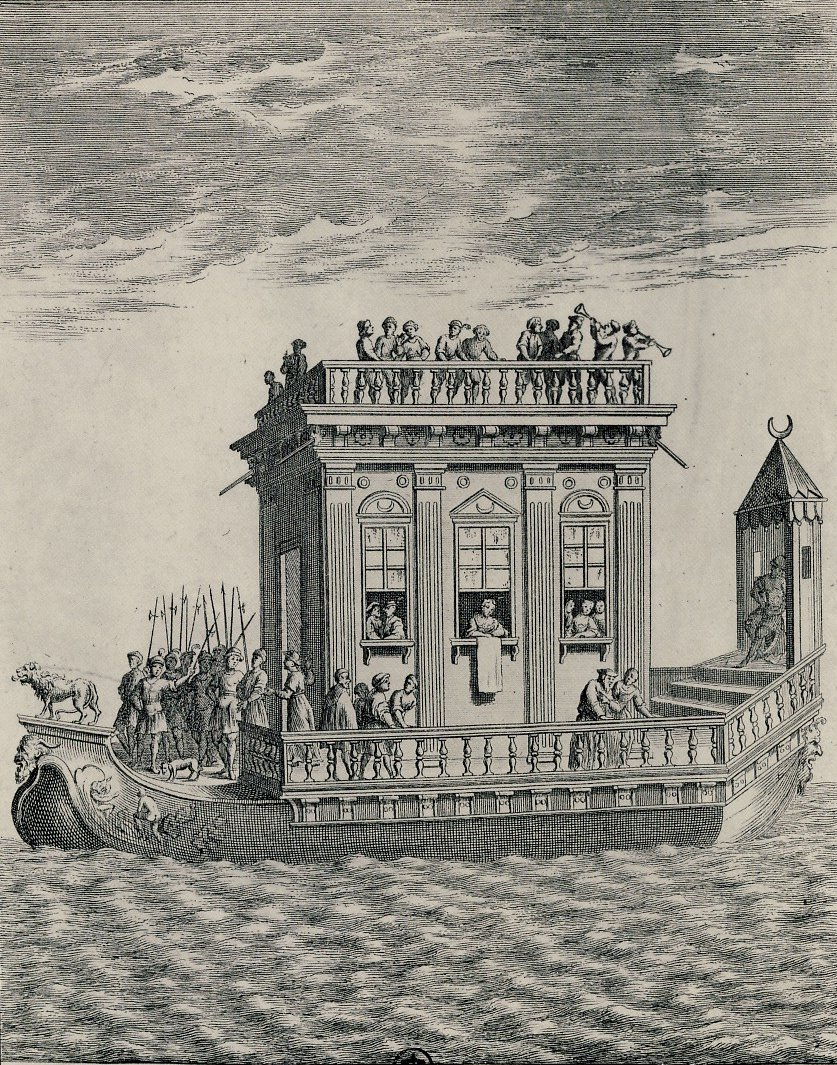
Engraving of the floating castle from the Entry of Henry II into Lyon, 1547; Henry and his queen were served a meal that rose into the central room from below decks.

- 1549–1550. Henry II of France and his family made a tour of entries which set the tone for Valois propaganda. For the Entry into Paris, 16 June 1549, following Catherine de' Medici's coronation at Saint-Denis, a loggia designed by Pierre Lescot with sculptures by Jean Goujon had been in preparation for two years; a naval battle was staged on the Seine, a tournament was held, and heretics were burned. The entry to Rouen was the introduction to France of the fully all'antica triumphal procession, and had a well-illustrated Festival Book, whose woodcut illustrations follow a set derived from Mantegna extremely closely – whether, or in what form, six elephants were actually seen in Rouen may be wondered. Henry IV's 1594 Rouen entry was also informatively illustrated.
- 1553: 3 August, entry of Mary I of England to London after she was proclaimed Queen, on 30 September there was another entry preceding her coronation at Westminster Abbey.
- 1554: 19 August, entry of Philip II of Spain and Mary I of England to London following their marriage.
- 1558: The new Queen Elizabeth I of England passed through the City of London on her way to her coronation at Westminster. A much less elaborate affair than Habsburg entries, but at least for the Protestant population, one more genuinely celebrated. There is a typical English emphasis on poems and orations, of which the majority were given by children. Elizabeth processed in a triumphal "Chariot", was presented with a bible by the city, and passed giant figures re-used from the wedding of her sister Mary. Both speeches and tableaus depicted her as saviour of the Protestant faith, a new Deborah. A 1578 entry into Norwich is almost homely; the master of the grammar school being apparently the only townsman whose Latin was fit to put before the Queen, he catches her up and orates at several points.
- 1561: Entry of Mary, Queen of Scots into Edinburgh, following her return from France.
- 1571: The separate entries of Charles IX of France and his new Habsburg queen, Elizabeth of Austria, into Paris, 6 March and 29, were recorded in a book of woodcuts with text, Simon Bouquet's Bref et sommaire receuil..., published in July. Bouquet, an alderman of Paris, was responsible for coordinating the details. Poets Jean Dorat and Pierre Ronsard drew up the iconographic program, and Germain Pilon executed temporary allegorical sculpture, and Niccolo dell'Abate provided paintings. The main theme was the inauguration of a new era of peace: Charles' personal motto, Piety and Justice furnished the allegory presented at one of the cortege's stops. A little over a year later the Saint Bartholomew's Day Massacres inaugurated a new phase of the wars.
- 1574: The new King Henry III of France on his way back from his brief period as King of Poland was given an exceptionally grand Entry to Venice, which rarely had the opportunity of welcoming a friendly monarch, though it had its own very lavish round of festivities. This was a "State Visit" with no element of accepting fealty. Tintoretto and Veronese collaborated in painting an arch designed by Palladio, and for the banquet for 3,000 in the Doge's Palace, statuettes in sugar designed by Jacopo Sansovino decorated the tables.Book
- 1579: The Entry of James VI into Edinburgh was intended to celebrate the commencement of the king's adult reign, after a childhood spent at Stirling Castle.
- 1583: The French Fury was a disastrously unsuccessful attempt by François, Duke of Anjou to use the excuse of an entry to take Antwerp – the citizens were forewarned and attacked the army as it marched through the streets, sending it running. They had already been sacked in the Spanish Fury in 1576, with the sack of Rome in 1527, among the most notorious anti-entries of the period.
- 1589: The triumphal entry of Christina of Lorraine at Florence and her wedding procession with Ferdinand I de' Medici, complete with ephemeral triumphal arches, included — interspersed with public shows, a game of calcio, animal-baiting, a staged joust in Piazza Santa Croce — semi-private court events, the musical intermedi that were presented in the newly redesigned theatre in the Uffizi; these elaborately costumed and staged allegorical tableaux with complex allegories mark a stage in the development of court pageantry and the masque, as well as in the pre-history of opera.
- 1590: The Entry and coronation of Anne of Denmark, bride of James VI of Scotland involved theatrical tableau and recitations at various locations in Edinburgh.
- 1598: For the triumphal entry of Pope Clement VIII into Ferrara, where the principal Este line had failed and the Pope had declared the fief to have reverted to the Papal States, the occasion urgently required splendidly presented and concrete allegorical propaganda, in order to justify the new situation to the Ferrarese. Once ensconced, Clement was host to a series of dukes and ambassadors honoured with princely entries themselves, climaxed with the betrothals by proxy of Margaret of Austria and Archduke Albert of Austria.
- 1604: Entry of James VI and I and Anne of Denmark into London, deferred from the previous year due to plague in the city.
- 1648: The "Joyous Entry" of Archduke Leopold William of Austria into Antwerp was also coordinated by Gevartius, who devised its iconography and published his own description. Rather than three-dimensional arches and tableaux, the allegories were rendered in two dimensions on strategically placed screens.

== See also ==
- Catherine de' Medici's court festivals
