= Hugh Sanford (MP) =

Hugh Sanford (died 1607) was an English scholar who served as tutor and secretary to the family of the Earl of Pembroke. He was involved in theatre at the Stuart court. Sanford served as a MP for Ludlow (1597) and Wilton (1601) and (1604).

== Career ==
Wilton House

Sanford's background is unknown. He was a tutor of William Herbert, 3rd Earl of Pembroke before 1593 when his pupil went to New College, Oxford. The family's country residence was Wilton House. The writer Samuel Daniel is also thought to have been a tutor at Wilton. The name of a character "Forsandrus", a tutor in Mary Wroth's The Countess of Montgomery's Urania, is an anagram of Hugh Sanford.

After the Union of the Crowns in 1603, the new Stuart royal family came on progress to the south of England because there was plague in London. Anne of Denmark and King James visited Wilton, where they may have met Sanford. Anne of Denmark, whose travelling household included her musician and dancing master Thomas Cardell, stayed in Winchester in October, and put on an masque entertainment for her son Prince Henry.

The French ambassador, Christophe de Harlay, Count of Beaumont, criticised the Winchester masque and reported that Anne of Denmark was planning superior entertainments for Christmas and New Year 1604. Her masque was The Vision of the Twelve Goddesses, written by Samuel Daniel. Daniel wrote that Anne of Denmark had chosen him at the suggestion of Lucy Russell, Countess of Bedford.

Thomas Edmondes wrote that Anne of Denmark's preparations for the new masque required the "use of invention" and the services of Sanford, who was to "direct the order and course for the Ladies [masque]". This may mean that Sanford directed the whole production, or perhaps the movement and choreography of the masquers. No payments to Sanford for this role have been found in the surviving records.

Sanford was at Whitehall at the end of October 1604, when Rowland Whyte reported he was travelling north to see Gilbert Talbot, 7th Earl of Shrewsbury at Sheffield Manor Lodge. According to Whyte, Sanford's travel plan was leisurely "at an ambling pace, Justice of the Peace like". In January 1605, Sanford wrote to the Earl of Shrewsbury from Baynard's Castle in London.. He was in Wiltshire in April 1605.
