= Scottish court =

Scottish court may refer to:

- Courts of Scotland, Scottish courts of law
- Royal Court of Scotland, the court of the Kingdom of Scotland
