= Norlie =

Norlie may refer to:

- Norlie, part of Swedish hip hop duo Norlie & KKV
- John Norlie, English musician
- Olaf M. Norlie, a Lutheran minister, educator and scholar
