= Thomas Cardell =

Lutist

Thomas Cardell or Cardall (died 1621) was a musician and dancing master specialising in playing the lute who served Elizabeth I and Anne of Denmark.

== Career ==
Thomas Cardell joined the court of Queen Elizabeth in 1574, as dancing master and lutenist, in the place of the Italian musician Jasper Gaffoyne. He married Ellen Cotton in 1575. Cardell's sister Elizabeth was the mother of the lutenist and composer Daniel Bacheler (1572-1619).

Cardell was paid £1 for devising and performing a dance at the Masque of Ladies and Boys at Windsor Castle on 5 January 1583. Beginning in 1588, Queen Elizabeth gave Cardell £40 yearly. The Earl of Rutland gave £3 to "Mr Cardewell" and 10 shillings to his boy as a New Year's Day gift in 1599 for teaching his sister Elizabeth Manners to dance.

After the Union of the Crowns, Cardell attended the funeral of Queen Elizabeth in mourning black cloth. He was made a groom of the privy chamber to Anne of Denmark. In Scotland she had been served by John Norlie, an English player of the viol. Cardell attended Anne and her daughter Princess Elizabeth in their progress to the west of England for 109 days during the plague in the autumn of 1603. Cardell was probably involved in the October 1603 masque known as Prince Henry's Welcome at Winchester. The composer and musician John Dowland was also at Winchester.

In January 1604, Cardell was given an annuity of £100. The seven or eight year old Princess Elizabeth sent Thomas Cardell or his son Francis to Robert Cecil, then Viscount Cranborne, with a note in French, asking Cecil to arrange for him to join her household and be remunerated, so she could keep him close by, as the new dance moves he had taught her pleased her parents.

== Francis Cardell and Princess Elizabeth ==
His son, Francis Cardell, was employed as a musician in the household of Princess Elizabeth from October 1604, at Coombe Abbey. An account book, written by Anne Livingstone, Countess of Eglinton, or Elizabeth herself, details expenses in the Princess' household. In January 1604, a New Year's Day gift of a ruby ring was given to the dancing master, almost certainly Francis Cardell.

Francis died soon after, and his father then held positions in both the households of Anne of Denmark and Princess Elizabeth. Thomas Cardell's annuity was converted to a pension of £140, and he became one of the most well-paid court musicians. He was listed as Elizabeth's dance teacher at the funeral of Prince Henry in 1612.

Anne of Denmark played the virginals, the lira, and a wind instrument, supplied and maintained by Robert Henlake. An Italian musician, John Maria Lugaro, wrote out music for her and bought song and consort books. In July 1614, Anne of Denmark's brother Christian IV came to London incognito and managed to enter Denmark House (Somerset House) without being discovered. He was recognised in the audience chamber by "Cardel, a dancer" and a French servant, perhaps Piero Hugon or one of her French musicians, confirmed the identification.

Cardell's daughter Anne (died 1648) married John Toppe of Wiltshire. She was buried at Freshwater on the Isle of Wight.

== Cardell as the character "Manley" ==
In 1640 the role of Thomas Cardell as a dancer at Queen Elizabeth's court was evoked in a play by William Cavendish and James Shirley, The Varietie, by a character called "Manly" who danced an old fashioned volta in vintage costume. Manly advocates the use of the outdated lute and cittern rather than the then fashionable fiddle and French kit. The dance, costume, and musical instruments of the Elizabethan era, according to Manly, were more properly masculine than current French fashions. Another character, Sir William, declares that Manly resembles a portrait of Cardell.
