= John Norlie =

English musician at the Scottish royal court

John Norlie (floruit 1599–1607) was an English musician at the Scottish royal court.

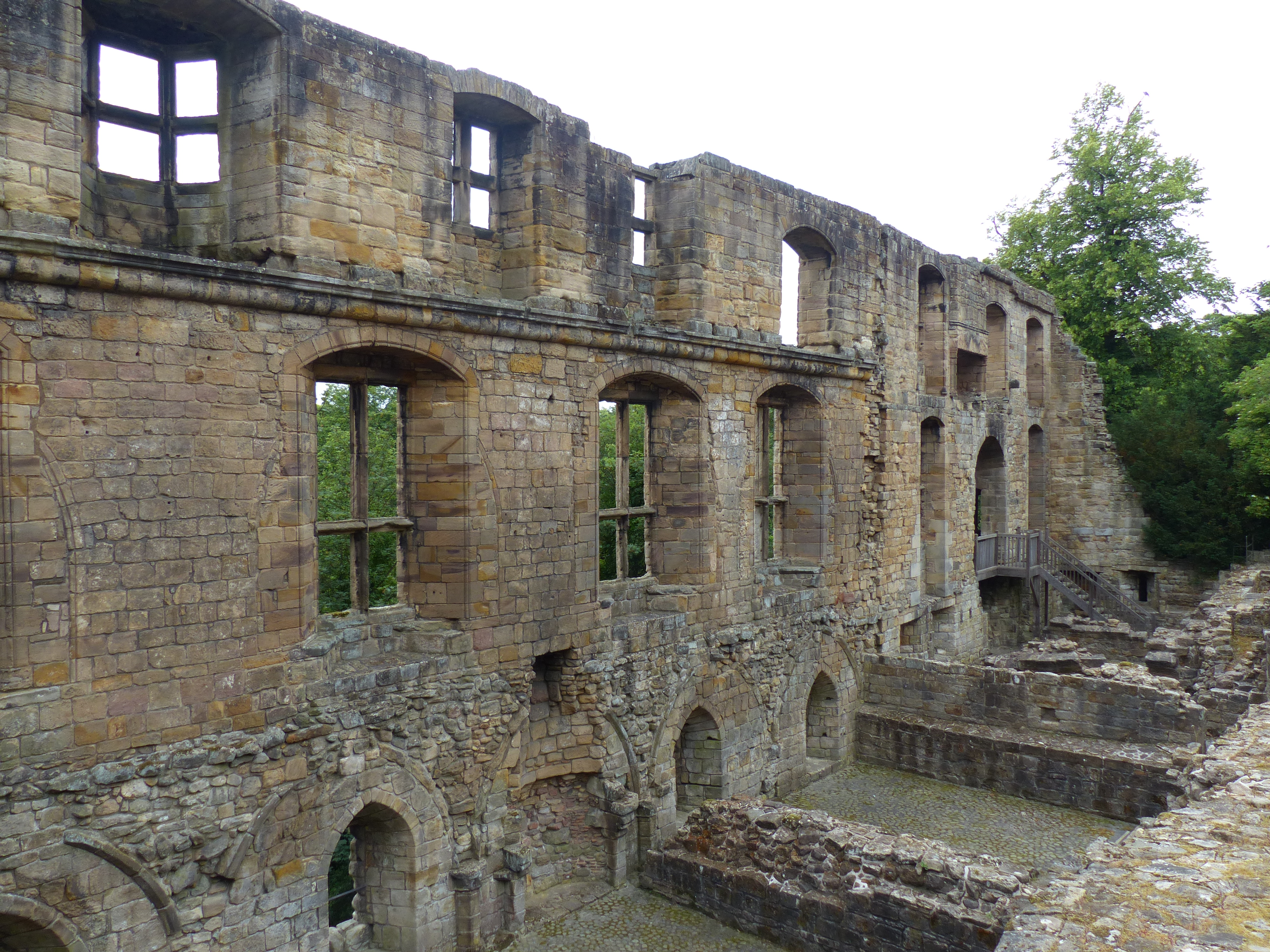
John Norlie played the lute and viol for Anne of Denmark at Dunfermline Palace

Little is known of Norlie's background, training, or early career. He played the lute and the viol at the Scottish court, as the Hudson brothers had done. He signed his name as "John Norlie", and in various other records his name was written as "John Orley".

On 1 May 1599, he was described as a daily servitor or servant to James VI, and was awarded the relatively large annual salary of £1,000 Scots. The award was on the condition that he maintain four other "musicians apt and meet to serve his majesty's music, and that they be always attending on his majesty's service as the occasion shall require."

On a receipt for money received from the depute-treasurer John Arnot in November 1601, Norlie described himself as "musicinar to the quenis majestie", indicating that he usually worked for Anne of Denmark.

Payments to Norlie appear in the royal treasurer's accounts, and in May 1603 he received £66-13s-4d. There are also payments to four English violers. The payment in May 1603 shows that he stayed with Anne of Denmark when James VI went south towards London at the Union of Crowns.

Norlie followed the court to London with Anne of Denmark, and is mentioned in royal accounts in 1604. In January 1607 he returned to Edinburgh and was engaged by the town council. "Jhonn Orley" was to serve with "schalmes, howboyes" and suchlike, with four expert musicians, to perform daily as required. His band wore silver badges and he was to have a fee of 100 merks annually. The badges were made by the queen's goldsmith George Heriot for £8 Scots. It seems that this initiative did not come to fruition.

There are only a few references to the queen's music in Scotland. An English visitor, Henry Lee, was received by James VI in his cabinet room at Holyrood Palace in October 1599 and he wrote that he could hear music from the adjacent queen's chamber, as the door was a little ajar. In England she employed a group of Danish musicians, Martin Otto, Magnus Peterson, Jacob Oven, and Hans Brockrogg, who were listed as "Dutch musicians" at the funeral of Prince Henry in 1612. They returned to Denmark in June 1614. Thomas Cardell, and an Italian or Savoyard musician, John Maria Lugario, were grooms of her privy chamber. She played the virginals, the lira, and a wind instrument, supplied and maintained by Robert Henlake. John Maria Lugario wrote out music for her and bought song and consort books.

The letter writer John Chamberlain noted in January 1618 that "the queen's musicians (whereof she hath more than a good many) made her a kind of masque, or antic, at Somerset House", evidently a more informal and private affair than the great court masques. Anne of Denmark staged a masque at Winchester, Prince Henry's Welcome at Winchester in October 1603, which seems likely to have been a household production. In Scotland, Anne and James VI bought costumes for masques performed at the weddings of her ladies in waiting.

== Family ==
Anna of Denmark was frequently resident at Dunfermline Palace. The parish register of Dunfermline describes Norlie as "John Orliance" and "John Orlie, violer to her majestie", in notes of the baptism of his son Frederick in December 1600 and daughter Anna in January 1602. His wife's name was Dorothy Lokie.

Another son, Frederick, was baptised on 8 February 1603. This time the father was recorded in the Canongate of Edinburgh register as "Jhone Norlie master violer to her majestie." The witnesses were the king, John, Master of Erskine, and John Logan.
