= Prince Henry's Welcome at Winchester =

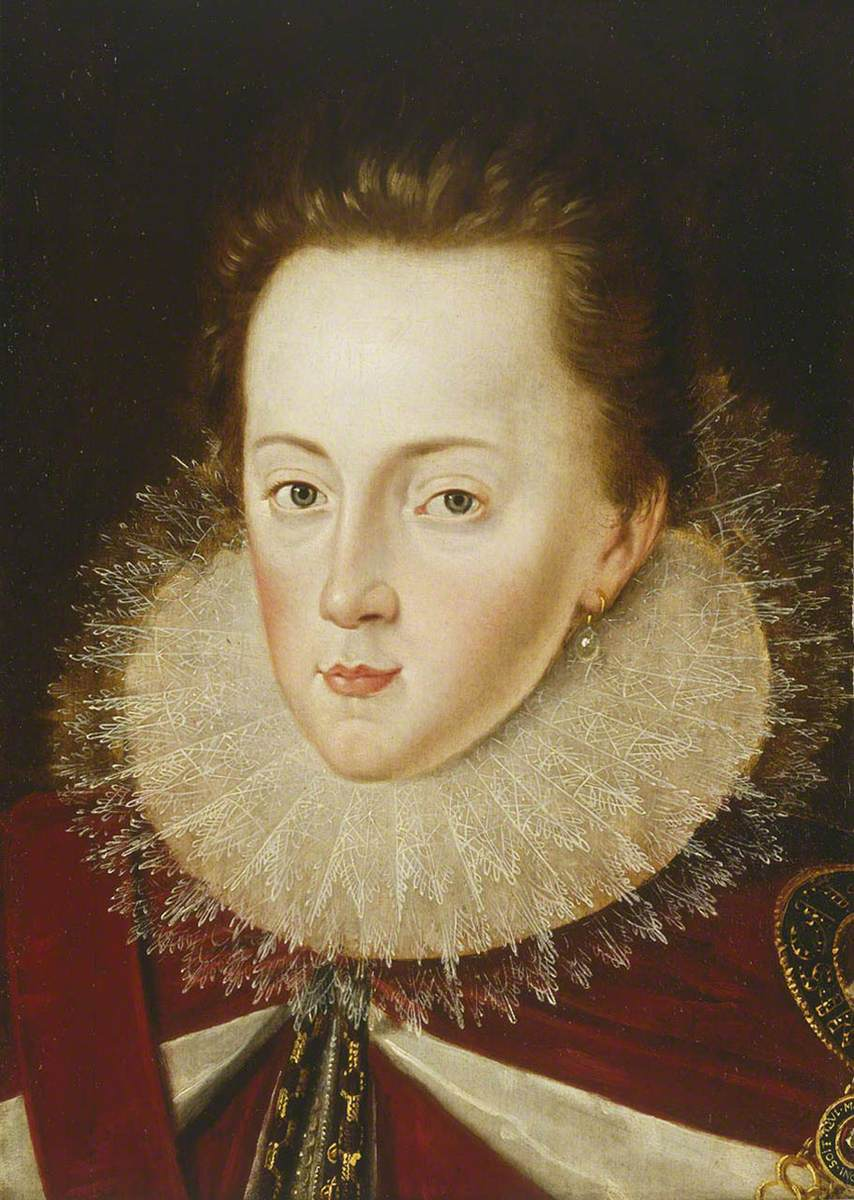
Henry Frederick, Prince of Wales, by Robert Peake

Prince Henry's Welcome at Winchester was a masque produced by Anne of Denmark and performed in 1603 at Winchester on a day between 11 and 17 October.

== Plague and a royal progress ==
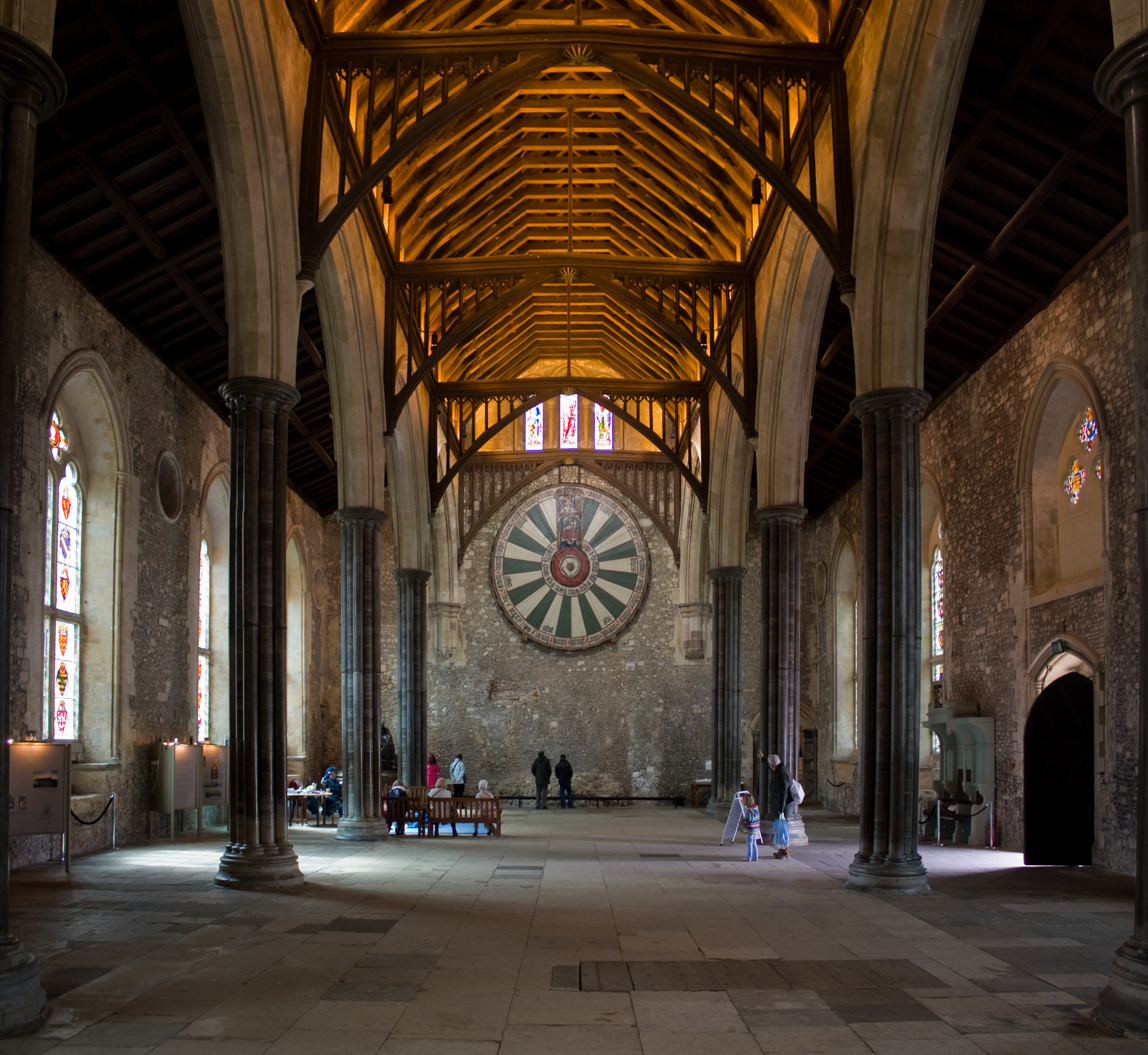
The Great Hall of Winchester Castle

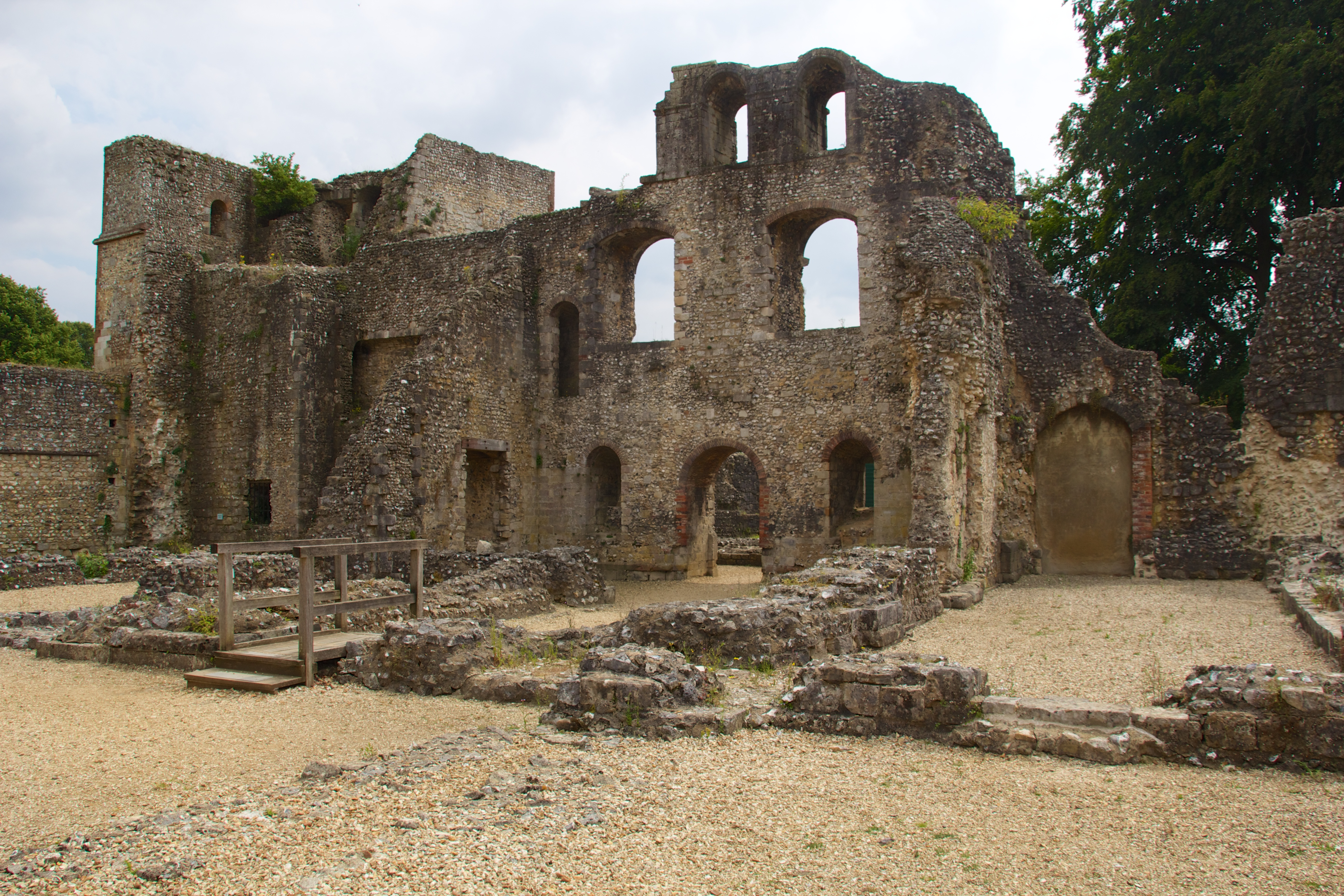
The masque may have been performed in the hall of Wolvesey Castle, the old Bishop's Palace

Prince Henry (1594–1612) was the son of James VI and I and Anne of Denmark. After the death of Queen Elizabeth in March 1603, James became king in England, an event known as the Union of the Crowns. Prince Henry and his sister, Princess Elizabeth came to stay in England. Elizabeth was at first at Oatlands, then plague came to London in June. After a wardrobe servant died in August, she joined Henry at Nonsuch. Two members of the queen's household died of plague in September. Henry and Elizabeth were moved from Nonsuch to Winchester, thought to be a more healthful place.

Anne of Denmark travelled to Winchester on 17 September 1603. King James and Anne had an audience with the Spanish ambassador, the Count of Villamediana at Winchester on 24 September. On 17 October, when Anne was moving to Wilton House, Thomas Edmondes wrote to the Earl of Shrewsbury that she had done her son, the Prince "the kindness at his coming hither to entertain him with a gallant mask". Prince Henry arrived in Winchester on 11 October and this may have been the day the masque was performed.

An account of expenses kept by Princess Elizabeth or Anne Livingstone, one of her Scottish companions, covers this period and mentions some details of their journey. It includes a payment to "James Duncan's man", a servant of the Queen's tailor and yeoman of the robes James Duncan for carrying gowns from Winchester to Princess Elizabeth's household at Nonsuch.

== Court theatre in time of plague ==
Few details are known about the masque which took place in October 1603, but it was mentioned in several newsletters. The title given to the event is not contemporary. Thomas Cardell, a lutenist and dancing master, was with the queen. The composer and lutenist John Dowland may have been involved; he mentioned meeting the queen at Winchester in the dedication of his Lachrimae. The queen's secretary, the poet William Fowler, who had written the baptism entertainments for Prince Henry in 1594, was also at Winchester. Fowler wrote to the Earl of Shrewsbury from Winchester.

The performance was an early example of a court masque with female performers. Actors and dancers in previous events in England and Scotland were usually men (including the masque of shepherds at Castle Campbell in January 1563, the "strangers" masque at the wedding of the wedding of the Earl of Huntly and Henrietta Stewart at Holyrood Palace in 1588, and the Tullibardine Masque in 1591). However, Elizabeth I's maids of honour had danced in a masque in 1600 at the marriage of Anne Russell and Henry Somerset, and Mary Fitton had a speaking part. Anne of Denmark had bought masque costume for herself in Scotland in 1591 and 1592, probably for performances at weddings. The Scottish kirk had objected to "balling" in her household.

Arbella Stuart was present and mentioned the Winchester masque in her own letter as "an enterlude, (as ridiculous as it was) but not so ridiculous as my letter". She described the queen's household playing children's games in their Winchester lodging.

Lady Anne Clifford had visited Prince Henry at Nonsuch Palace in the first week of October and Clifford's cousin Frances Bourchier joined Princess Elizabeth's household. Some time after Michaelmas (11 October), Anne heard of the performance at Winchester, and she recalled that it had damaged the reputation of Anne of Denmark and the women of her court:

Now there was much talk of a masque which the Queen had at Winchester and how all the ladies about the Court had gotten such ill-names that it was grown a scandalous place, and the Queen herself much fallen from her former greatness and reputation she had in the world.

Perhaps the personal participation of the queen and her ladies in the masque or dance caused the scandal. The adverse comment could reveal gender concerns, making "masques seem less like peaceful celebrations of royal power and virtue than sites of female misrule".

The queen's household at Winchester may have included; Anna Livingstone, Margaret Stewart, Anna Campbell, Jane Drummond and Margaret Hartsyde. Margaret Stewart danced at Basing House in September 1603 and played the part of Concordia in The Vision of the Twelve Goddesses.

On 30 October, King James and Anne of Denmark made their Royal Entry to Southampton. Before the court returned to London, according to Arbella Stuart, the Spanish ambassador, the Count of Villamediana, organised a dinner for Beaumont's wife, Anne de Rabot, asking her to invite some English ladies. She brought the Countess of Bedford, Lady Penelope Rich, Lady Susan de Vere, and "Lady Dorothy", probably Dorothy Hastings.

== Planning masques for Christmas and the New Year ==
The masque at Winchester was mentioned in connections with plans for future court festivities. The French ambassador, Christophe de Harlay, Count of Beaumont, commented that Winchester show was "rustic" in the sense of unsophisticated (rather than in the pastoral genre) and served to raise the queen's spirits, and Anne of Denmark was planning superior and more costly entertainments, realised as The Masque of Indian and China Knights and The Vision of the Twelve Goddesses. The Winchester masque seems to have been for her son, rather than for the entertainment of a diplomatic elite. John Leeds Barroll suggests it was a "domestic event". Dudley Carleton mentioned plans for Christmas at Windsor Castle, that "many plays and shows are bespoken, to give entertainment to our ambassadors". Thomas Edmondes wrote that the queen's preparations required the "use of invention" and the services of Hugh Sanford, who was to "direct the order and course for the Ladies". Sanford was a tutor of the Earl of Pembroke.

Pleasing the ambassadors had become a priority: another French ambassador Louis de l'Hôpital, Sieur de Vitry, had already expressed dissatisfaction with a gift he received from the king. Lord Cecil wrote letters filled with anxiety that the Spanish and French ambassadors, the Count of Villamediana and the Marquis of Rosny, would find their hospitality less than that given the other, or their predecessors.
