= Adrian Lefeau =

French musician at the court of Mary, Queen of Scots

Adrian Lefeau or Leseau was a French musician at the court of Mary, Queen of Scots.

Adrian Lefeau was a valet at the Scottish court and dined with other musicians, who were also appointed as valets to the queen. Mary bought him a black satin doublet in 1563.

He was sent to France to buy viols, lutes, and other musical instruments. His ship returned to Montrose and the coffer of string instruments was carried to Holyrood Palace.

He seems to have left Scotland before Easter 1567 as his name does not appear in a list with the other valets.
