= Robert Henlake =

English maker and tuner of musical instruments

Robert Henlake or Henlocke (died 1610) was an English maker and tuner of musical instruments who worked for Elizabeth I, James VI and I, and Anne of Denmark.

Henlake worked with Gulliam Schets (or Edmund Schetts alias Treasourer) for 16 years tuning instruments for Queen Elizabeth. Henlake successfully petitioned King James to be his instrument maker following Schets' death, with the support of several courtiers. From 27 June 1603 he held a joint appointment with Andrea Bassano until his death in 1610, as tuners of the king's virginals, organs, and other instruments.

In January 1610 Samuel Calvert tried to engage "Robin Henlake" to give or arrange virginal lessons to the diplomat William Trumbull or his family. Henlake started making a lesson book for Trumbull. An earlier manuscript anthology of lute music compiled by or for Trumbull survives and includes works by the Bassano family and Francis Cutting. Calvert reported Henlake's death in June 1610, before the virginal book was completed.

== Working for Anne of Denmark ==
Henlake mended lutes and viols for Daniel Bacheler, a musician working for Anne of Denmark. In August and September 1607 Henlake worked at Hampton Court repairing a wind instrument for Anne of Denmark according to the instructions of Viscount Lisle, her Master of Household and her secretary William Fowler. He supplied a pair of virginals to Anne of Denmark in February 1608. Henlake's office was in the king's household but musicians particularly are found working in the other royal households.
