= Royal Court of Scotland =

Court of the Kingdom of Scotland

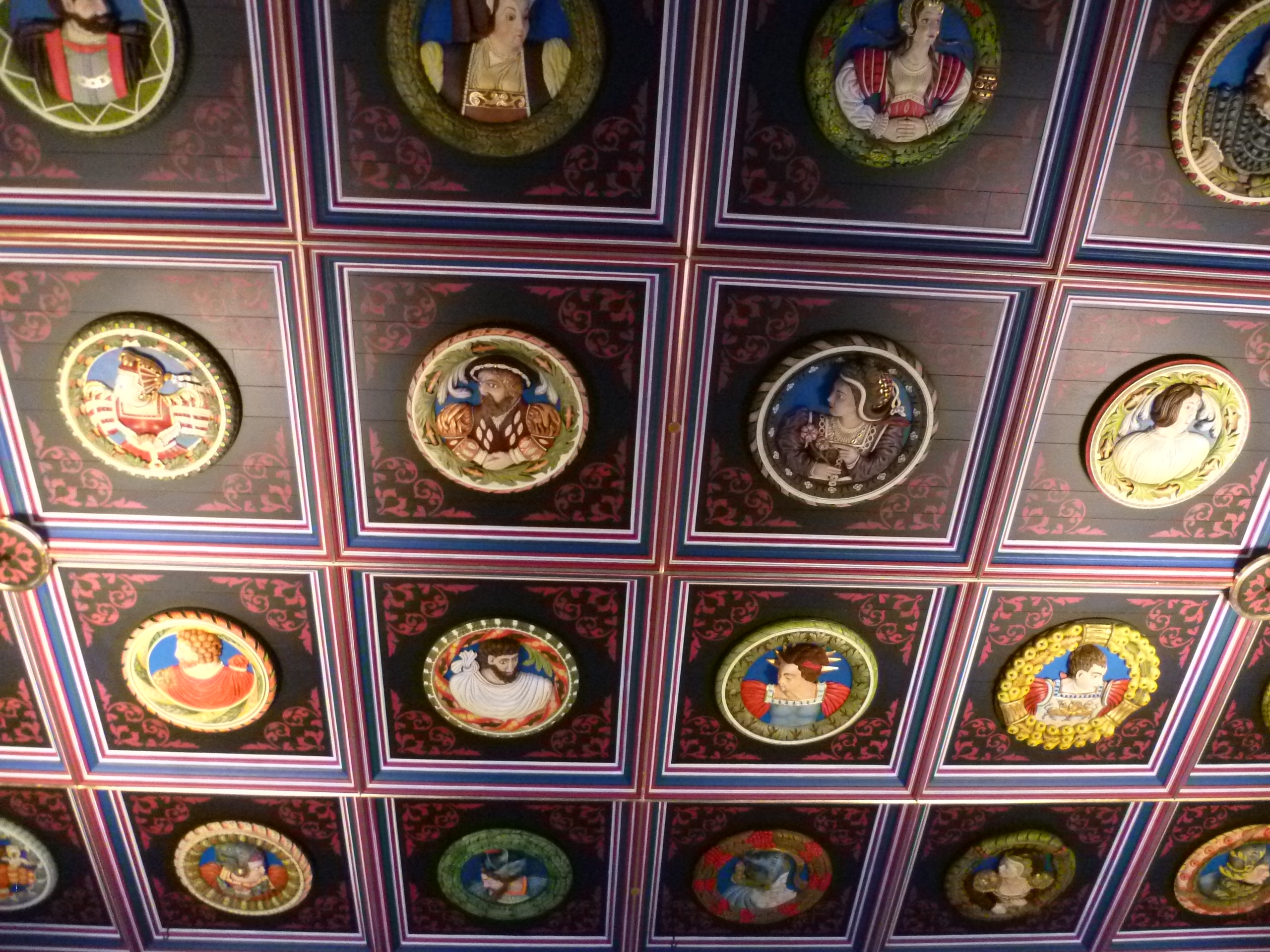
The Stirling Heads, carved roundels on the roof of the King's Chamber in Stirling Castle, include many members of the court of James V

The Royal Court of Scotland was the administrative, political and artistic centre of the Kingdom of Scotland. It emerged in the tenth century and continued until it ceased to function when James VI inherited the throne of England in 1603. For most of the medieval era, the king had no "capital" as such. The Pictish centre of Forteviot was the chief royal seat of the early Gaelic Kingdom of Alba that became the Kingdom of Scotland. In the twelfth and thirteenth centuries Scone was a centre for royal business. Edinburgh only began to emerge as the capital in the reign of James III but his successors undertook occasional royal progress to a part of the kingdom. Little is known about the structure of the Scottish royal court in the period before the reign of David I when it began to take on a distinctly feudal character, with the major offices of the Steward, Chamberlain, Constable, Marischal and Lord Chancellor. By the early modern era the court consisted of leading nobles, office holders, ambassadors and supplicants who surrounded the king or queen. The Chancellor was now effectively the first minister of the kingdom and from the mid-sixteenth century he was the leading figure of the Privy Council.

At least from the accession of David I Gaelic ceased to be the main language of the royal court and was probably replaced by French. In the late Middle Ages, Middle Scots, became the dominant language. Ideas of chivalry began to dominate during the reign of David II. Tournaments provided one focus of display. The Scottish crown in the fifteenth century adopted the example of the Burgundian court, through formality and elegance putting itself at the centre of culture and political life. By the sixteenth century, the court was central to the patronage and dissemination of Renaissance works and ideas. It was also central to the staging of lavish display that portrayed the political and religious role of the monarchy.

There were probably filidh, who acted as poets, musicians and historians, often attached to the court of a lord or king. After the "de-gallicisation" of the Scottish court, a less highly regarded order of bards took over their functions, accompanying their poetry on the harp. James I may have taken English and continental styles and musicians back to the Scottish court after his captivity and Scotland followed the trend of Renaissance courts for instrumental accompaniment and playing. Much Middle Scots literature was produced by makars, poets with links to the royal court. James VI became patron and member of a loose circle of Scottish Jacobean court poets and musicians, later called the Castalian Band. From the fifteenth century the records of the Scottish court contain references to artists. The most impressive works and artists were imported from the continent, particularly the Netherlands. James VI employed two Flemish artists, Arnold Bronckorst and Adrian Vanson, who have left a visual record of the king and major figures at the court. In the early Middle Ages Forteviot probably served as a royal palace. The introduction of feudalism into Scotland in the twelfth century led to the introduction of royal castles. Under the Stuart Dynasty there was a programme of extensive building and rebuilding of royal palaces.

Lavish spending on luxurious clothing, fine foods, the patronage of innovative architecture, art and music can be seen from the reign of James I. His successors struggled with different levels of success with the costs of the royal court. After James VI inherited the English throne in 1603 the Scottish court effectively ceased to exist, ending its role as a centre of artistic patronage, political display and intrigue.

== Location ==
The seal of Walter Fitzalan (1106–77), the first hereditary Royal Stewart

For most of the medieval era, the king was itinerant and had no "capital" as such. The Pictish centre of Forteviot was the chief royal seat of the early Gaelic Kingdom of Alba that became the Kingdom of Scotland. It was used by Cinaed mac Ailpin (Kenneth MacAlpin, r. 843–58) and his brother Domnall mac Ailpín (Donald I MacAlpin, 812–62). Later poetic tradition suggests that Máel Coluim mac Donnchada (Malcolm III "Canmore", r. 1058–93) was also resident and charters of Malcolm IV (dated 1162–64) and of William I (dated 1165–71) indicate that it remained important into the twelfth century. After this it fell from the royal circuit, but it remained a royal estate until the fourteenth century. David I (r. 1124–53) tried to build up Roxburgh as a royal centre, but in the twelfth and thirteenth centuries, more charters were issued at Scone than any other location, suggesting that this was a centre for royal business. Other popular locations in the early part of the era were nearby Perth, Stirling, Dunfermline and Edinburgh.

The court was severely disrupted during the Wars of Independence (1296–1357) and almost ceased to function, but was restored by Robert I and his Stuart successors, who attempted to embody national and dynastic identity. In the later Middle Ages the king moved between royal castles, particularly Perth and Stirling, but continued to hold judicial sessions throughout the kingdom. Edinburgh only began to emerge as the capital in the reign of James III (r. 1460–88) at the cost of considerable unpopularity, as it was felt that the king's presence in the rest of the kingdom was part of his role. Although increasingly based at the royal palace of Holyrood in Edinburgh, the monarch and the court still spent time at the refurbished royal palaces of Linlithgow, Stirling and Falkland, and still undertook occasional royal progress to different parts of the kingdom to ensure that the rule of law, royal authority or smooth government was maintained.

== Composition ==
=== Offices ===
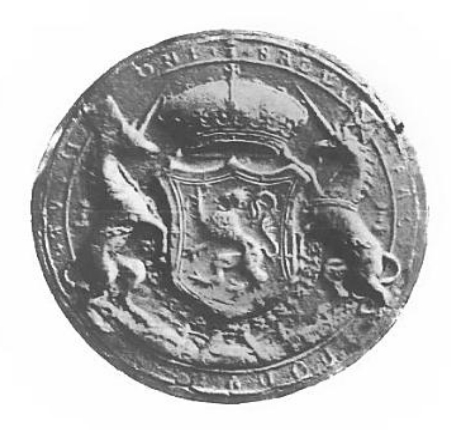
The first Great Seal of Mary Queen of Scots (1542–67)

Little is known about the structure of the Scottish royal court in the period before the reign of David I. Some minor posts that are mentioned in later sources are probably Gaelic in origin. These include the senior clerks of the Provend and the Liverence, in charge of the distribution of food, and the Hostarius (later Usher or "Doorward"), who was in charge of the royal bodyguard. By the late thirteenth century the court had taken on a distinctly feudal character. The major offices were the Steward or Stewart, Chamberlain, Constable, Marischal and Lord Chancellor. The office of Stewart, responsible for management of the king's household, was created by David I and given as an hereditary office to Walter Fitzalan, whose descendants became the House of Stewart. The office was merged with the crown when Robert II inherited the throne. The other major secular posts also had a tendency to become hereditary. The Chamberlain was responsible for royal finances and the Constable for organising the crown's military forces, while the Marishchal had a leadership role in battle. The Chancellor, who was usually a clergyman in the Middle Ages, had charge of the king's chapel, which was also the major administrative centre of the crown, and had control of the letters, legal writs and seals. Under him were various posts, usually filled by clerics, including the custodian of the great seal. From the reign of James III onwards, the post of Chancellor was increasingly taken by leading laymen.

By the early modern era the court consisted of leading nobles, office holders, ambassadors and supplicants who surrounded the king or queen. At its centre was the monarch and members of the Privy Chamber. Gentleman of the chamber were usually leading nobles or individuals with kinship links to the leading noble families. They had direct access to the monarch, with the implication of being able to exert influence, and were usually resident at the court. The Chancellor was now effectively the first minister of the kingdom and from the mid-sixteenth century he was the leading figure of the Privy Council. His department, the chancery, was responsible for the Great Seal, which was needed to process the inheritance of land titles and the confirmation of land transfers. His key responsibility was to preside at meetings of the Privy Council, and, on those rare occasions he attended, at meetings of the court of session. The second most prestigious office was now the Secretary, who was responsible for the records of the Privy Council and for foreign policy, including the borders, despite which the post retained its importance after the Union of Crowns in 1603. The Treasurer was the last of the major posts and, with the Comptroller, dealt with the royal finances until the Comptroller's office was merged into the Treasurer's from 1610. Administration of the royal household and provisioning was the duty of the masters of the royal household while the fabric of the palaces was maintained by the masters of work.

The Lord President of the Court of Session, often known simply as the Lord President, acted as a link between the Privy Council and the Court. The king's advocate acted as the legal council. The post emerged in the 1490s to deal with the king's patrimonial land rights and from 1555 there were usually two king's councilors, indicating the increase in the level of work. From 1579 they increasingly became a public prosecutor. After the union most of the offices remained, but political power was increasingly centered in London.

=== General council ===
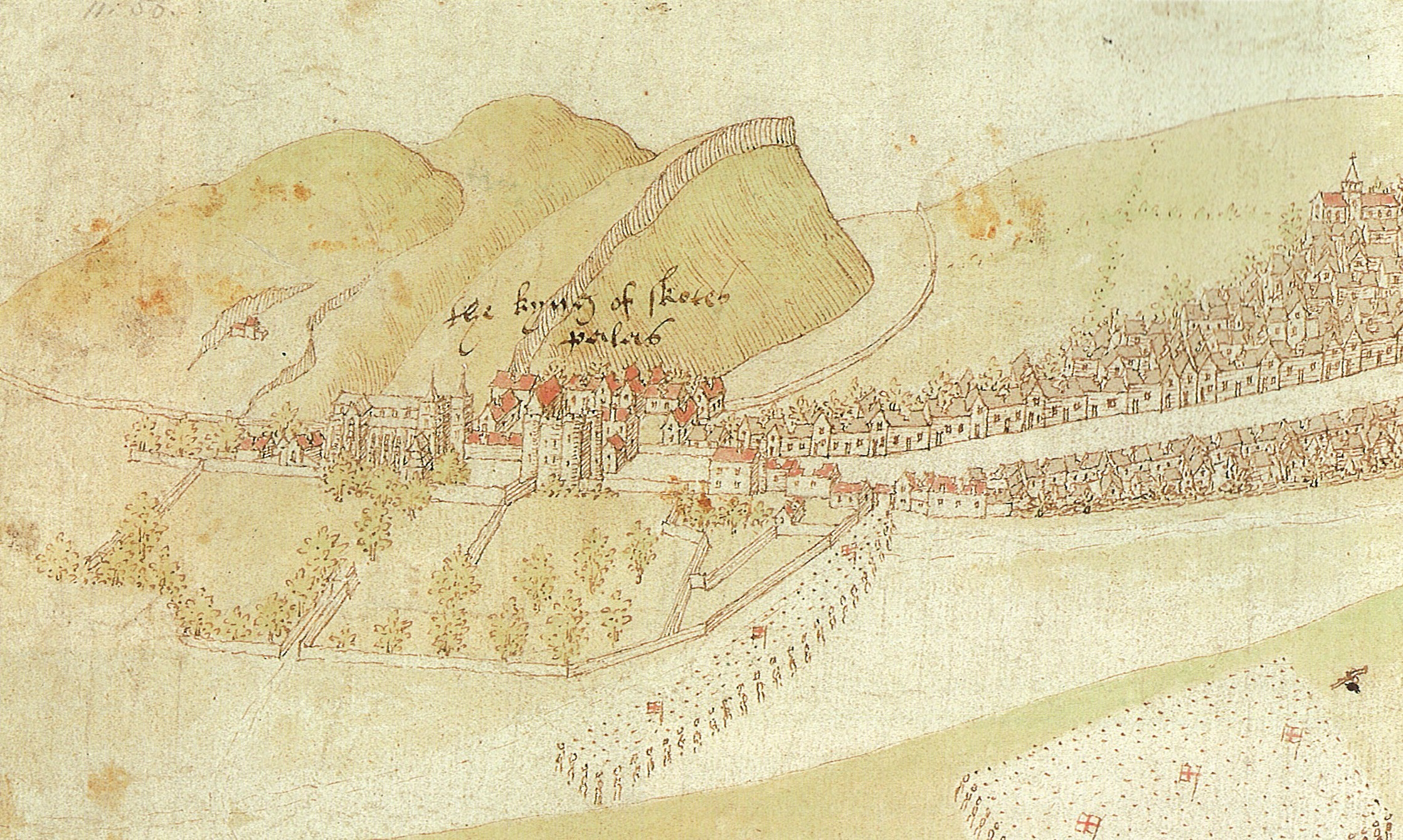
Detail from the so-called 'Hertford sketch' of Edinburgh in 1544, showing Holyrood Palace, described as 'the kyng of Skotts palas' and the main site for council meetings

After the crown, the most important government institution in the late Middle Ages was the king's council, composed of the king's closest advisers and presided over by the Lord Chancellor. Unlike its counterpart in England, the king's council in Scotland retained legislative and judicial powers. It was relatively small, with normally less than 10 members in a meeting, some of whom were nominated by parliament, particularly during the many minorities of the era, as a means of limiting the power of a regent.

The council was a virtually full-time institution by the late fifteenth century, and surviving records from the period indicate that it was critical in the working of royal justice. Nominally members of the council were some of the great magnates of the realm, but they rarely attended meetings. Most of the active members of the council for most of the late Medieval Period were career administrators and lawyers, almost exclusively university-educated clergy. The most successful of these moved on to occupy the major ecclesiastical positions in the realm as bishops and, towards the end of the period, archbishops. By the end of the fifteenth century, this group was being joined by increasing numbers of literate laymen, often secular lawyers, of which the most successful gained preferment in the judicial system and grants of lands and lordships.

=== Privy Council ===
The Privy Council developed out of the theoretically larger king's or queen's council of leading nobles and office holders in the sixteenth century. "Secret Councils" had been maintained during the many regencies of the later medieval era, but the origins of the Privy Council were in 1543, during the minority of Mary, Queen of Scots (r. 1542–67). After her majority it was not disbanded, but continued to sit and became an accepted part of government. While in session in Edinburgh, the Privy Council met in what is now the West Drawing Room at the Palace of Holyroodhouse. When the monarch was at one of the royal palaces or visiting a region of the kingdom on official business, the council would normally go with them and as a result of being away from its servants, records and members, its output tended to decrease. While the monarch was away on a holiday or hunting trip, the council usually stayed in session in Edinburgh and continued to run the government.

The Privy Council's primary function was judicial, but it also acted as a body of advisers to the monarch and as a result its secondary function was as an executive in the absence or minority of the monarch. Although the monarch might often attend the council, their presence was not necessary for the council to act with royal authority. Like parliament, it had the power to issue acts that could have the force of law. Although the theoretical membership of the council was relatively large, at around 30 persons, most of the business was carried out by an informal inner group, consisting mainly of the officers of state.

== Culture ==
=== Language ===
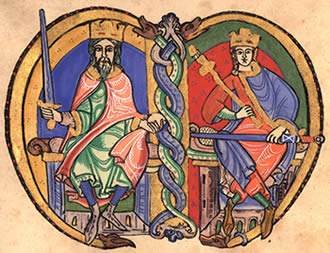
David I, credited with changing the culture of the court from Gaelic to Norman, with his successor Malcolm IV who allegedly described himself as French

The union of the Gaelic and Pictish kingdoms that created the kingdom of Alba in the eighth century led to a domination by Gaelic language and culture. At least from the accession of David I (r. 1124–53), as part of a Davidian Revolution that introduced French culture and political systems, Gaelic ceased to be the main language of the royal court and was probably replaced by French. So complete was this cultural transformation that David's successors Malcolm IV and William I, according to the English Barnwell Chronicle, confessed themselves to be French in "both in race and in manners, in language and culture". However, Gaelic culture remained part of the court throughout the Middle Ages, with Gaelic musicians and poets still being patronised by James IV (1488–1513), who was a Gaelic speaker. In the late Middle Ages, Middle Scots, became the dominant language of the country. It was derived largely from Old English, with the addition of elements from the Gaelic, French & Scandinavian languages. Although resembling the language spoken in northern England, it became a distinct language from the late fourteenth century onwards. As the ruling elite gradually abandoned French, they began to adopt Middle Scots, and by the fifteenth century it was the language of government, with acts of parliament, council records and treasurer's accounts almost all using it from the reign of James I (r. 1406–37) onwards and of the court soon after.

=== Display ===
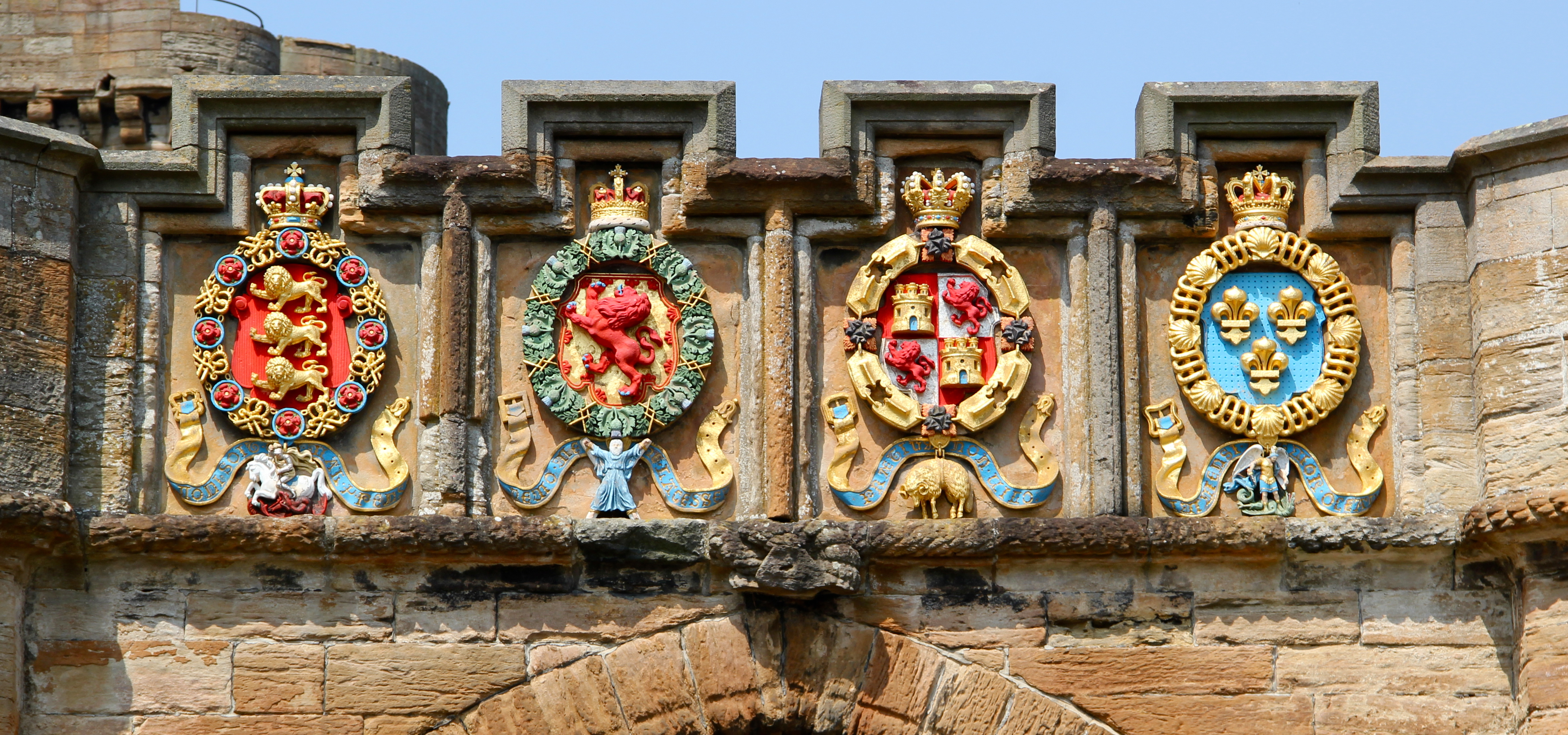
The four European orders of chivalry to which James V belonged on the entrance to Linlithgow Palace: the orders of the Garter, the Thistle, the Golden Fleece and St. Michael

Ideas of chivalry, similar to those that developed at the English court of Edward III, began to dominate in Scotland during the reign of the Anglophile David II (1329–71). Tournaments provided one focus of display. These occurred in 1449 at Stirling Castle in the reign of James II (r. 1437–60), where the Burgundian adventurer Jacques de Lalaing fought the greatest Scottish knights. In the early sixteenth century chivalry was evolving from a practical military ethos into a more ornamental and honorific cult. It saw its origins in the classical era, with Hector of Troy, Alexander the Great and Julius Caesar often depicted as proto-knights. James IV held tournaments of the Wild Knight and the Black Lady in 1507 and 1508, events with an Arthurian theme. Tournaments were pursued enthusiastically by James V (r. 1513–42) who, proud of his membership of international orders of knighthood, displayed their insignia on the Gateway at Linlithgow Palace.

Like most western European monarchies, the Scottish crown in the fifteenth century adopted the example of the Burgundian court, through formality and elegance putting itself at the centre of culture and political life, defined with display, ritual and pageantry, reflected in elaborate new palaces and patronage of the arts. By the sixteenth century, the court was central to the patronage and dissemination of Renaissance works and ideas. It was also central to the staging of lavish display that portrayed the political and religious role of the monarchy. During her brief personal rule Mary, Queen of Scots brought many of the elaborate court activities that she had grown up with at the French court, with balls, masques and celebrations, designed to illustrate the resurgence of the monarchy and to facilitate national unity. There were elaborate staged events at the investiture of Mary's husband Darnley in at Candlemass in February 1566. In December of the same year there was an elaborate three-day festival to celebrate the baptism of her son and heir, the future James VI, copied from the festivities at Bayonne a year before by Charles IX of France. It included a ritual assault on a fort by mock "wild highlanders", symbolising the role of the dynasty in defending the nation. Under James VI the court returned to being a centre of culture and learning and he cultivated the image of a philosopher king, evoking the models of David, Solomon and Constantine.

=== Music ===
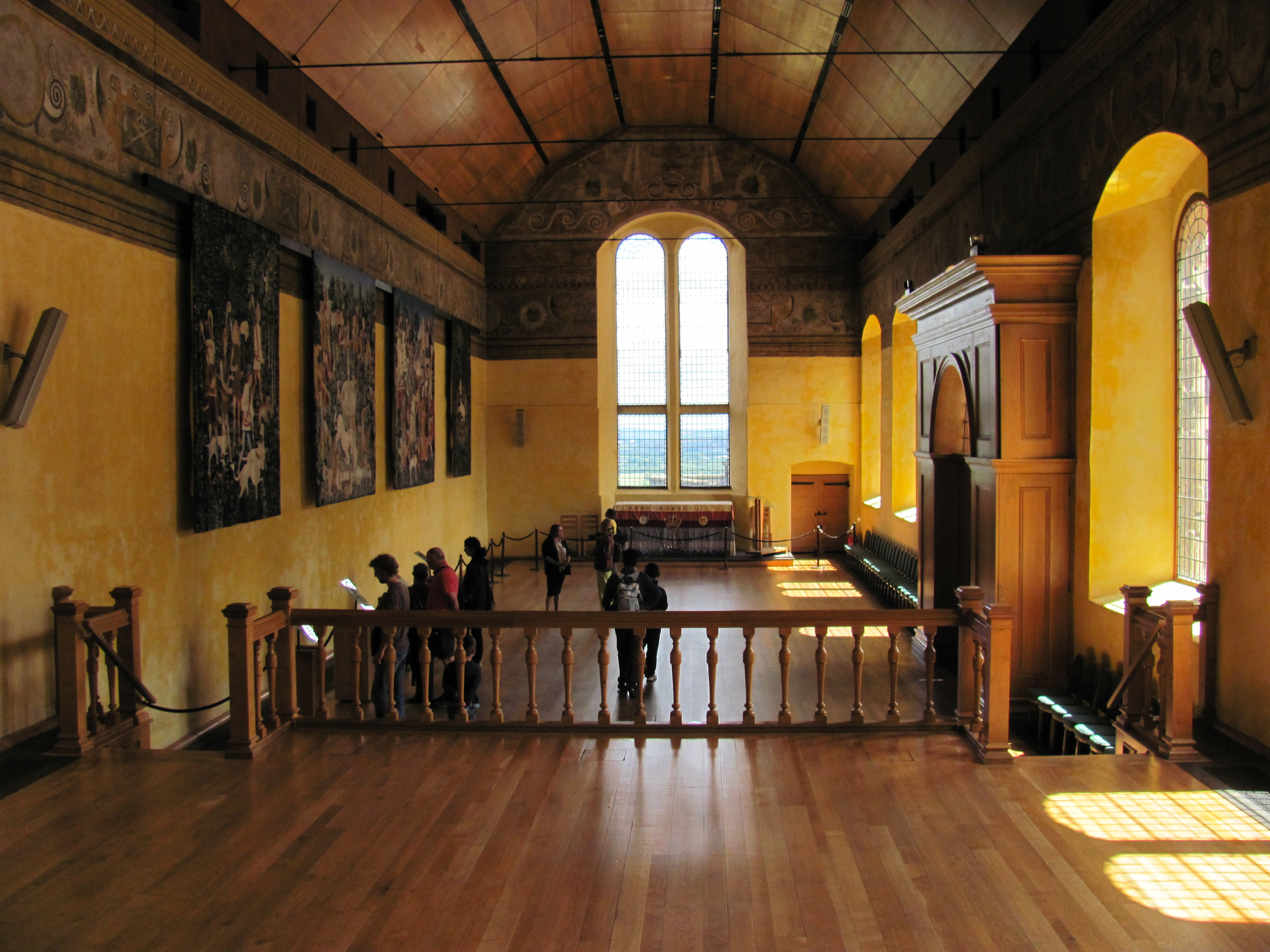
The interior of the Chapel Royal, Stirling Castle, a major focus for liturgical court music

Early Medieval Scotland and Ireland shared a common culture and language. There are much fuller historical sources for Ireland, which suggest that there would have been filidh in Scotland, who acted as poets, musicians and historians, often attached to the court of a lord or king, and passed on their knowledge and culture in the Gaelic to the next generation. After the "de-gallicisation" of the Scottish court, a less highly regarded order of bards took over the functions of the filidh, often trained in bardic schools. They probably accompanied their poetry on the harp. When Alexander III (r. 1249–86) met Edward I in England he was accompanied by a Master Elyas, described as "the king of Scotland's harper".

The captivity of James I in England from 1406 to 1423, where he earned a reputation as a poet and composer, may have led him to take English and continental styles and musicians back to the Scottish court on his release. The story of the execution of James III's favourites, including the English musician William Roger, at Lauder Bridge in 1482, may indicate his interest in music. Renaissance monarchs often used chapels to impress visiting dignitaries. James III also founded a new large hexagonal Chapel Royal at Restalrig near Holyrood, that was probably designed for a large number of choristers. In 1501 his son James IV refounded the Chapel Royal within Stirling Castle, with a new and enlarged choir meant to emulate St. George's Chapel at Windsor Castle and it became the focus of Scottish liturgical music. Burgundian and English influences were probably reinforced when Henry VII's daughter Margaret Tudor married James IV in 1503. No piece of music can be unequivocally identified with these chapels, but the survival of a Mass based on the Burgundian song L'Homme armé in the later Carver Choirbook may indicate that this was part of the Chapel Royal repertoire. James IV was said to be constantly accompanied by music, but very little surviving secular music can be unequivocally attributed to his court. An entry in the accounts of the Lord Treasurer of Scotland indicates that when James IV was at Stirling on 17 April 1497, there was a payment "to twa fithalaris [fiddlers] that sang Greysteil to the king, ixs". Greysteil was an epic romance and the music survives, having been placed in a collection of lute airs in the seventeenth century.

Scotland followed the trend of Renaissance courts for instrumental accompaniment and playing. James V, as well as being a major patron of sacred music, was a talented lute player and introduced French chansons and consorts of viols to his court, although almost nothing of this secular chamber music survives. The return of Mary, Queen of Scots from France in 1561 to begin her personal reign, and her position as a Catholic, gave a new lease of life to the choir of the Chapel Royal, but the destruction of Scottish church organs meant that instrumentation to accompany the mass had to employ bands of musicians with trumpets, drums, fifes, bagpipes and tabors. Like her father she played the lute, virginals and (unlike her father) was a fine singer. She brought French musical influences with her, employing lutenists and viol players in her household.

James VI (r. 1566–1625) was a major patron of the arts in general. He rebuilt the Chapel Royal at Stirling in 1594 and the choir was used for state occasions like the baptism of his son Henry. He followed the tradition of employing lutenists like John Norlie for his private entertainment, as did other members of his family. James VI and his wife Anne of Denmark attended wedding celebrations and danced in costume at masques.

=== Literature ===
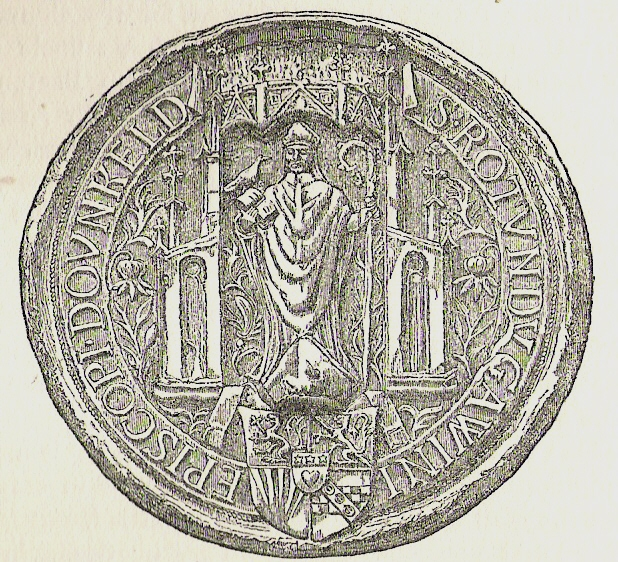
The seal of Gavin Douglas as Bishop of Dunkeld

The first surviving major text in Scots literature is John Barbour's Brus (1375), composed under the patronage of Robert II and telling the story in epic poetry of Robert I's actions before the English invasion until the end of the war of independence. The work was extremely popular among the Scots-speaking aristocracy, and Barbour is referred to as the father of Scots poetry, holding a similar place to his contemporary Chaucer in England. Much Middle Scots literature was produced by makars, poets with links to the royal court, which included James I, who wrote the extended poem The Kingis Quair.

James IV's (r. 1488–1513) creation of a Renaissance court included the patronage of poets who were mainly clerics. These included Robert Henryson (c. 1450-c. 1505), who re-worked Medieval and Classical sources, such as Chaucer and Aesop in works such as his Testament of Cresseid and The Morall Fabillis. William Dunbar (1460–1513) produced satires, lyrics, invectives and dream visions that established the vernacular as a flexible medium for poetry of any kind. Gavin Douglas (1475–1522), who became Bishop of Dunkeld, injected Humanist concerns and classical sources into his poetry. The landmark work in the reign of James IV was Douglas's version of Virgil's Aeneid, the Eneados. It was the first complete translation of a major classical text in an Anglian language, finished in 1513, but overshadowed by the disaster at Flodden that brought the reign to an end.

As a patron of poets and authors James V supported William Stewart and John Bellenden, who translated the Latin History of Scotland compiled in 1527 by Hector Boece, into verse and prose. David Lyndsay (c. 1486–1555), diplomat and the head of the Lyon Court, was a prolific poet. He wrote elegiac narratives, romances and satires. George Buchanan (1506–82) had a major influence as a Latin poet, founding a tradition of neo-Latin poetry that would continue in to the seventeenth century. Contributors to this tradition included royal secretary John Maitland (1537–95), reformer Andrew Melville (1545–1622), John Johnston (1570?–1611) and David Hume of Godscroft (1558–1629).

From the 1550s, in the reign of Mary, Queen of Scots and the minority of her son James VI (r. 1567–1625), cultural pursuits were limited by the lack of a royal court and by political turmoil. The Kirk, heavily influenced by Calvinism, also discouraged poetry that was not devotional in nature. Nevertheless, poets from this period included courtier and minister Alexander Hume (c. 1556–1609), whose corpus of work includes nature poetry and epistolary verse. Alexander Scott's (?1520-82/3) use of short verse designed to be sung to music, opened the way for the Castalian poets of James VI's adult reign.

In the 1580s and 1590s James VI strongly promoted the literature of the country of his birth in Scots. His treatise, Some Rules and Cautions to be Observed and Eschewed in Scottish Prosody, published in 1584 when he was aged 18, was both a poetic manual and a description of the poetic tradition in his mother tongue, to which he applied Renaissance principles. He became patron and member of a loose circle of Scottish Jacobean court poets and musicians, later called the Castalian Band, which included William Fowler (c. 1560–1612), John Stewart of Baldynneis (c. 1545–c. 1605), and Alexander Montgomerie (c. 1550–98). They translated key Renaissance texts and produced poems using French forms, including sonnets and short sonnets, for narrative, nature description, satire and meditations on love. Later poets that followed in this vein included William Alexander (c. 1567–1640), Alexander Craig (c. 1567–1627) and Robert Ayton (1570–1627). By the late 1590s the king's championing of his native Scottish tradition was to some extent diffused by the prospect of inheriting of the English throne.

=== Art ===
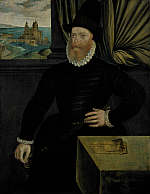
Painting of Regent Morton, one of the portraits of leading figures of the late sixteenth-century court by Flemish artist Arnold Bronckorst

From the fifteenth century the records of the Scottish court contain references to artists. Matthew the "king's painter" is the first mentioned, said to be at Linlithgow in 1434. The most impressive works and artists were imported from the continent, particularly the Netherlands, generally considered the centre of painting in the Northern Renaissance. The products of these connections included Hugo van Der Goes's altarpiece for the Trinity College Church in Edinburgh, commissioned by James III, and the work after which the Flemish Master of James IV of Scotland is named. There are also a relatively large number of elaborate devotional books from the late fifteenth and early sixteenth centuries, usually produced in the Low Countries and France for Scottish patrons, including the Flemish illustrated book of hours, known as the Hours of James IV of Scotland, given by James IV to Margaret Tudor and described as "perhaps the finest medieval manuscript to have been commissioned for Scottish use". Around 1500, about the same time as in England, Scottish monarchs turned to the recording of royal likenesses in panel portraits, painted in oils on wood, perhaps as a form of political expression. In 1502 James IV paid for delivery of portraits of the Tudor household, probably by the "Inglishe payntour" named "Mynours," who stayed in Scotland to paint the king and his new bride Margaret Tudor the following year. "Mynours" was Maynard Wewyck, a Flemish painter who usually worked for Henry VII in London. As in England, the monarchy may have had model portraits of royalty used for copies and reproductions, but the versions of native royal portraits that survive are generally crude by continental standards.

The tradition of royal portrait painting in Scotland was disrupted by the minorities and regencies it underwent for much of the sixteenth century. In his majority James V was probably more concerned with architectural expressions of royal identity. Mary Queen of Scots had been brought up in the French court, where she was drawn and painted by major European artists, but she did not commission any adult portraits, with the exception of the joint portrait with her second husband Henry Stuart, Lord Darnley. This may have reflected an historic Scottish pattern, where heraldic display or an elaborate tomb were considered more important than a portrait. There was an attempt to produce a series of portraits of Scottish kings in panel portraits, probably for the royal entry of the fifteen-year-old James VI in 1579, which are Medieval in form. In James VI's personal reign, Renaissance forms of portraiture began to dominate. He employed two Flemish artists, Arnold Bronckorst in the early 1580s and Adrian Vanson from around 1584 to 1602, who have left a visual record of the king and major figures at the court. For his leisure interests, James VI commissioned a decorative painter, James Workman to make a board for playing the Game of the Goose.

=== Architecture ===
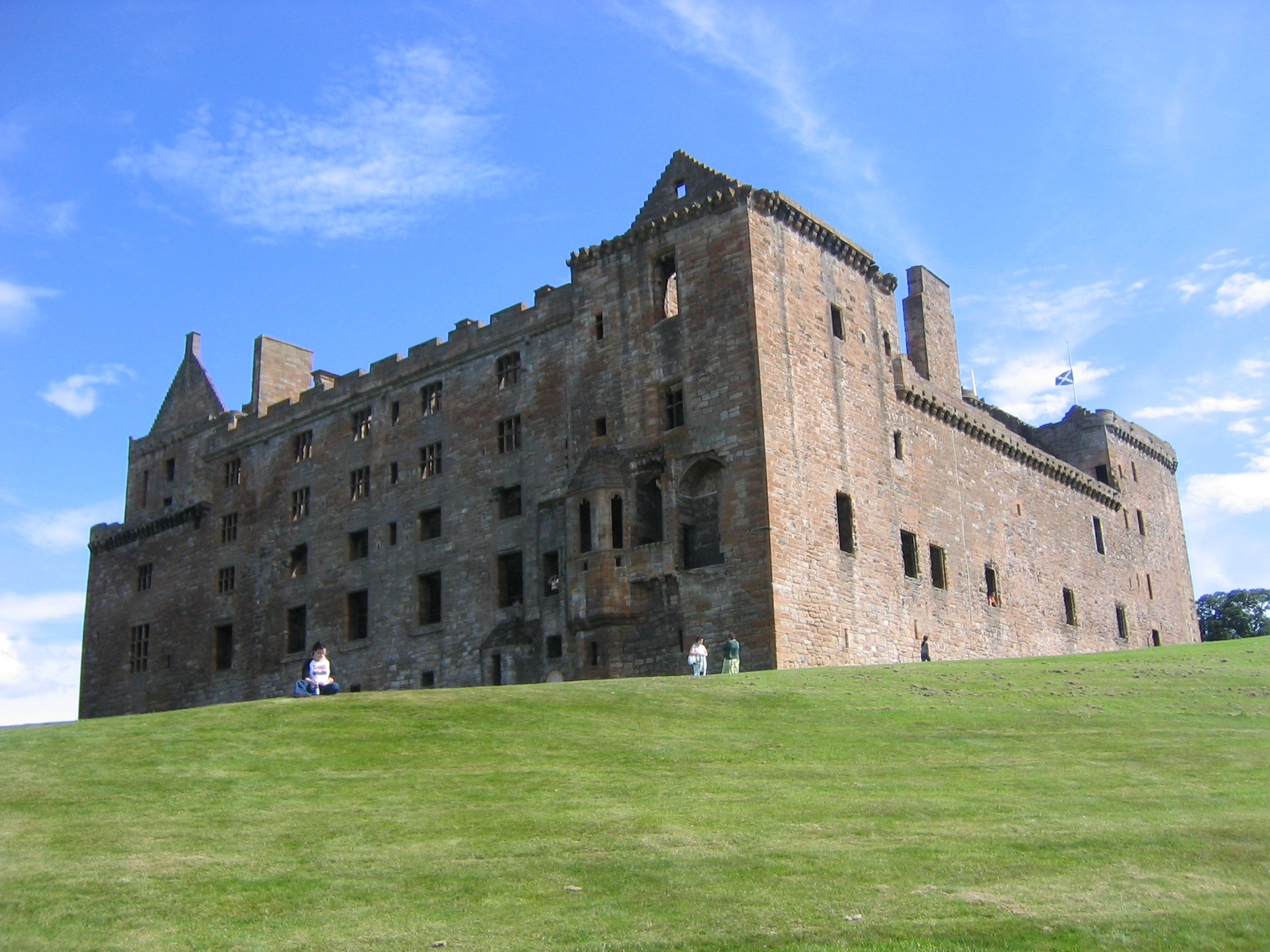
Linlithgow Palace, the first building to bear the title "palace" in Scotland, extensively rebuilt along Renaissance principles from the fifteenth century

The royal centre at Forteviot was not in a defensive situation and there are no traces of any fortified enclosure. There is some archaeological evidence of artistic and architectural patronage on an impressive scale. The most notable piece of sculpture is the Dupplin Cross, found nearby and perhaps once part of the complex, but there are other fragments including the unique Forteviot Arch. Aerial photographs show that Forteviot was also the site of a major cemetery.

The introduction of feudalism into Scotland in the twelfth century led to the creation of baronial castles. There were also royal castles, often larger and providing defence, lodging for the itinerant Scottish court and a local administrative centre. By 1200 these included fortifications at Ayr and Berwick. Alexander II (r. 1198–1249) and Alexander III (r. 1249–86) undertook a number of castle building projects in the modern style, but this phase of royal castle building came to an end with the early death of Alexander III that ushered in the Wars of Independence.

Under the Stuart Dynasty there was a programme of extensive building and rebuilding of royal palaces. This probably began under James III, accelerated under James IV and reached its peak under James V. The influence of Renaissance architecture is reflected in these buildings. Linlithgow was first constructed under James I (r. 1406–27), under the direction of master of work John de Waltoun and was referred to as a palace from 1429, apparently the first use of this term in the country. It was extended under James III and resembled a quadrangular, corner-towered Italian signorial palace or palatium ad moden castri (a castle-style palace), combining classical symmetry with neo-chivalric imagery. There is evidence that Italian masons were employed by James IV, in whose reign Linlithgow was completed and other palaces were rebuilt with Italianate proportions.

In 1536 James V visited France for his marriage to Madeleine of Valois and would have come in contact with French Renaissance architecture. His second marriage to Mary of Guise two years later may have resulted in longer-term connections and influences. One multi-talented French wood-carver, furniture-maker, and metal-worker, Andrew Mansioun settled in Edinburgh and trained apprentices. Scottish architecture largely disregarded the insular style of England under Henry VIII and adopted forms that were recognisably European. Rather than slavishly copying continental forms, elements of these styles were integrated into traditional local patterns, and adapted to Scottish idioms and materials (particularly stone and harl). The building at Linlithgow was followed by rebuilding at Holyrood Palace, Falkland Palace, Stirling Castle and Edinburgh Castle, described by Roger Mason as "some of the finest examples of Renaissance architecture in Britain". Many of the building programs were planned and financed by James Hamilton of Finnart, Steward of the Royal Household and Master of Works to James V.

From the mid-sixteenth century royal architectural work was much more limited. There were minor works were undertaken at Edinburgh Castle after the siege of 1575 and a viewing platform was added to Stirling Castle in the 1580s. Work undertaken for James VI by William Schaw demonstrated continued Renaissance influences in the classical entrance of the Chapel Royal at Stirling, built in 1594.

== Finance ==
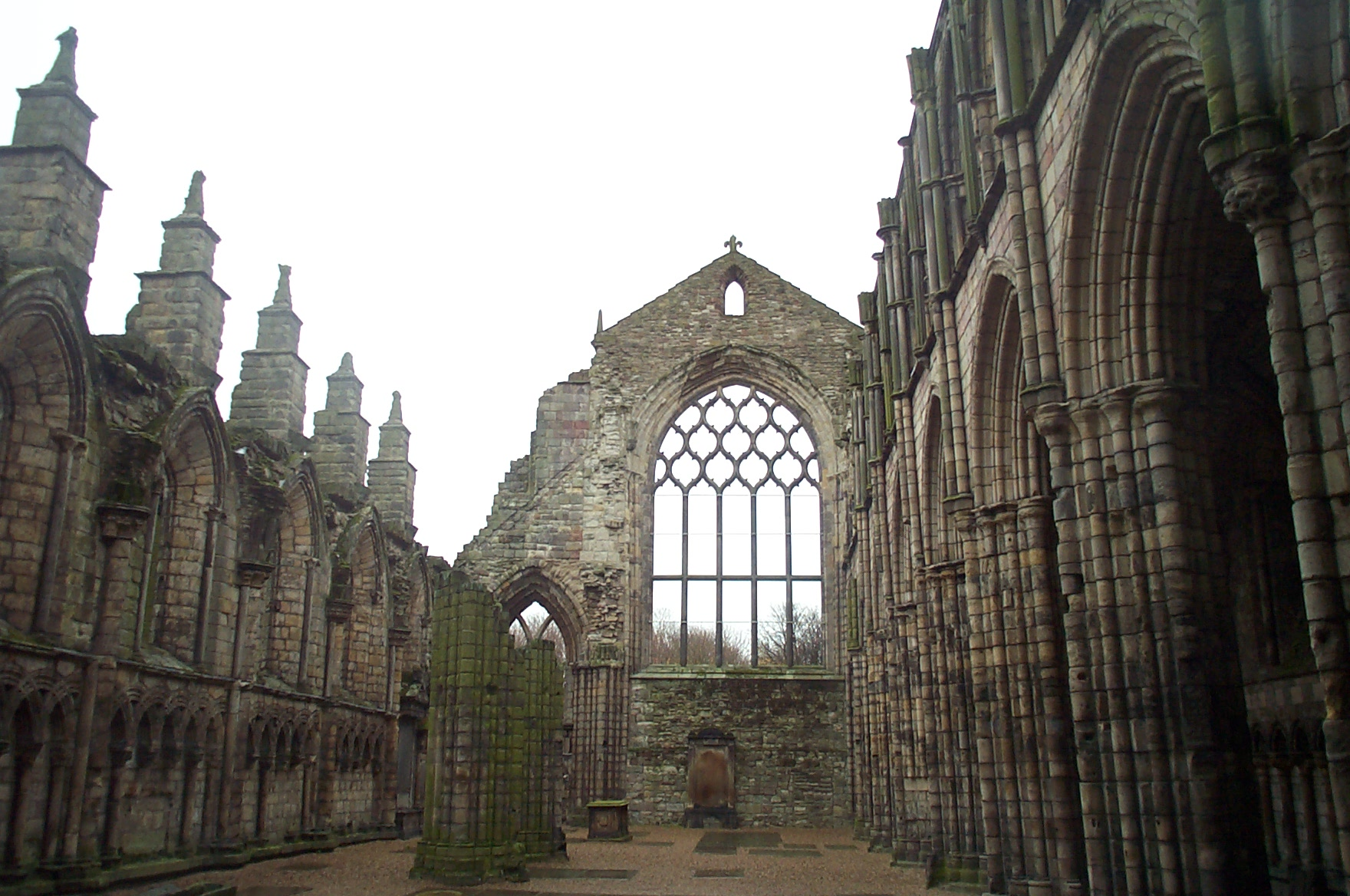
The ruins of Holyrood Abbey, which was briefly rebuilt to provide a chapel for the small court of the future James VII

Lavish spending on luxurious clothing, fine foods, the patronage of innovative architecture, art and music can be seen from the reign of James I. Records of royal income and spending were maintained by the Treasurer and Comptroller of Scotland and have been published as sources for historians.

James III is generally thought to have amassed a surplus and, despite his lavish spending, James IV was able to sustain his finances, probably thanks mainly to an increase in revenues from crown lands, the latter doubling his income from this source across his reign. James V was able to undertake lavish court spending due to two dowries from the King of France and his ability to exploit the wealth of the church, despite which spending kept pace with expanding income. Mary, Queen of Scots' attempt to create a court in the image the French Renaissance monarchy was hampered by financial limitations, intensified by the general price inflation of the period.

The court of James VI proved extremely expensive and may have provided one of the motivations for the attempted coup of the Ruthven Raid of 1582. After his marriage to Anne of Denmark in 1589, spending in the court spiraled further out of control. Costume for the king and queen and favoured household servants came from an English subsidy gifted by Queen Elizabeth and managed by the goldsmith Thomas Foulis and the textile merchant Robert Jousie. Despite the money from England, by the closing months of 1591 the rising costs of both households prompted estimates and suggestions for cutting costs on food and costume, and increasing revenue from royal assets. The last of the queen's dowry, 54,000 Danish dalers, which had been loaned to several Scottish towns was spent on the elaborate court entertainment and masque for the baptism of Prince of Wales in August 1594. A group of courtiers known as the Octavians emerged after making economies in the queen's household. They were given control of the exchequer but angered established nobles who were the main beneficiaries of royal favour and were dismissed in 1598.

== Dissolution ==
After James VI inherited the English throne in 1603 the Scottish court effectively ceased to exist, ending its role as a centre of artistic patronage, political display and intrigue. A number of Scottish poets, including William Alexander, John Murray and Robert Aytoun accompanied the king to London, where they continued to write, but they soon began to anglicise their written language. The Chapel Royal now began to fall into disrepair, and the court in Westminster would be the only major source of royal music. The result has been seen as a shift "from crown to castle", as the nobility and local lairds became the major sources of artistic patronage.

The Privy Council functioned as a subservient executive carrying out instructions from London. Holyrood Abbey was remodelled as a chapel for Charles I's royal visit in 1633. and Holyrood would be reclaimed by Charles II after the Restoration. As commissioner the future James VII's took up residency in the early 1680s, running what was in effect a small court. However, it was sacked by an anti-papist mob during the Glorious Revolution in 1688 and would never be repaired.
