= Daniel Bacheler =

English lutenist and composer

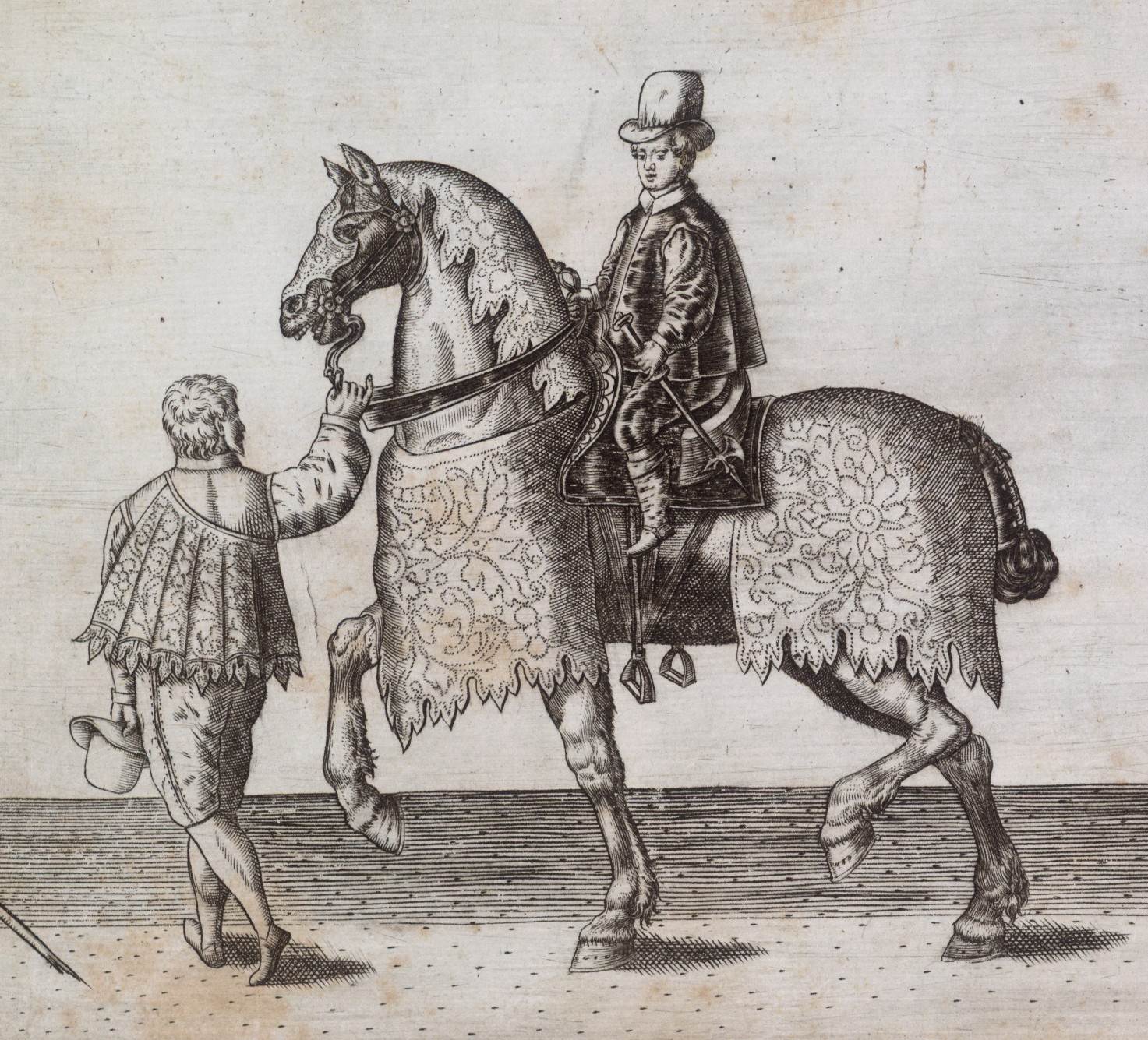
Daniel Bacheler (on horseback) from an engraving by Thomas Lant of the funeral procession of Sir Philip Sidney in 1586

Daniel Bacheler, also variously spelt Bachiler, Batchiler or Batchelar, (baptized 16 March 1572 – buried 29 January 1619) was an English lutenist and composer. Of all the English lutenist-composers, he was perhaps the most successful in his own lifetime.

Bacheler was born in the Buckinghamshire village of Aston Clinton, a son of Richard Bachelor and his wife Elizabeth (née Cardell). He served an apprenticeship with his uncle, Thomas Cardell, who was a lutenist and dancing-master in the court of Queen Elizabeth I.

He worked for Sir Francis Walsingham, Robert Devereux, 2nd Earl of Essex, and finally as a groom of the privy chamber for Queen Anne of Denmark, consort of James I.

At the royal court he composed some fifty lute pieces. These included a number of pavans, galliards, almains and fantasies, including a set of variations on the popular tune "Monsieurs Almaine". Elizabeth Roche, reviewing a CD of his work for The Daily Telegraph commented on the current neglect of Bacheler's music, suggesting that one reason is the "difficulty of his ornamental style, including arpeggios, trills, and even the dazzling tremolos that conclude his variations on Monsieurs Almaine".

The Heralds Visitation records show that Bacheler received a grant of arms in 1606.

His lute song, "To plead my faith", was published in Robert Dowland's 1610 collection, A Musical Banquet.

He was buried on 29 January 1618/1619 in St Margaret's churchyard, Lee, Kent.

== Bibliography ==
- Bacheler, Daniel, Selected works for lute / Daniel Bacheler; edited and transcribed by Martin Long, London: Oxford University Press, 1972. ISBN 0-19-355305-8
- Long, Martin., The music of Daniel Bacheler: a critical study, University of Sydney, 1969.
- Batchelor, A: 'Daniel Bacheler: The Right Perfect Musician', The Lute, 28 (1988), 3–12
