= 1603 London plague =

London plague 1603

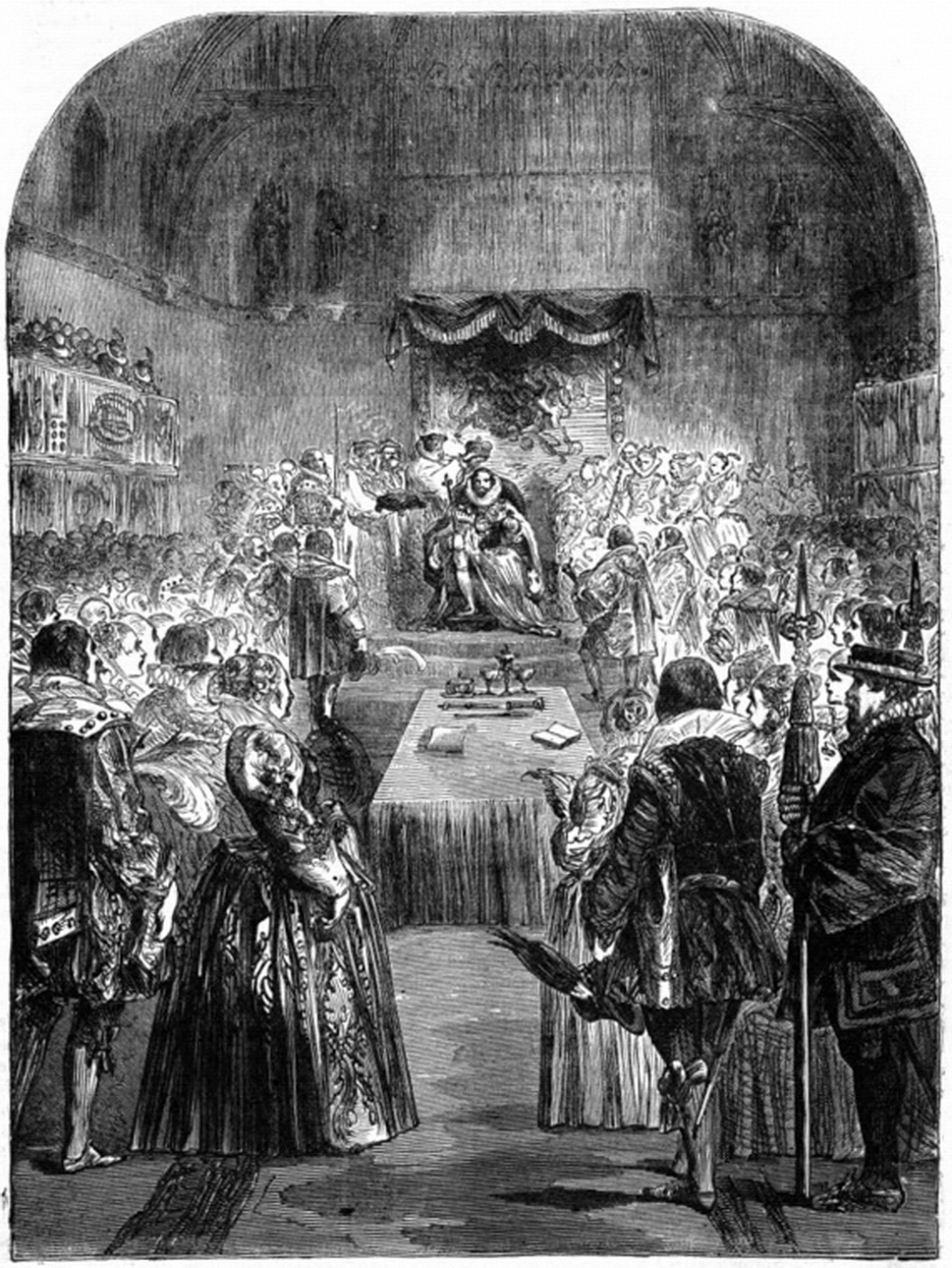
- King James I's coronation ceremony was held on 25 July 1603 despite the plague.
- Disease: Plague
- Pathogen: Yersinia pestis
- Location: London, England
- Date: 1603–1604
- Deaths: 23,045~35,000

The 1603 London plague epidemic was the first of the 17th century and marked the transition from the Tudor to the Stuart period.

While sources vary as to the exact number of people killed, around one-fifth of London's population is estimated to have died. While the plague affected all parts of the city, it disproportionately impacted London's poorer parishes.

== London in 1603 ==
Migration from rural areas and London's high birth rates helped the population recover from the 1592–1593 plague, with an average of 6000 christenings a year leading up to 1603.

Patchy sanitation by city authorities and an abundance of organic litter in the impoverished neighborhoods fueled a large rat population within the city walls, where one-third of London lived. Two-thirds of London's population resided in the crowded, unsanitary, and poorly-governed parishes known as "liberties" which surrounded the walls and extended into the countryside. Like every London plague since 1563, the 1603 epidemic began in the liberties.

== Plague in London ==
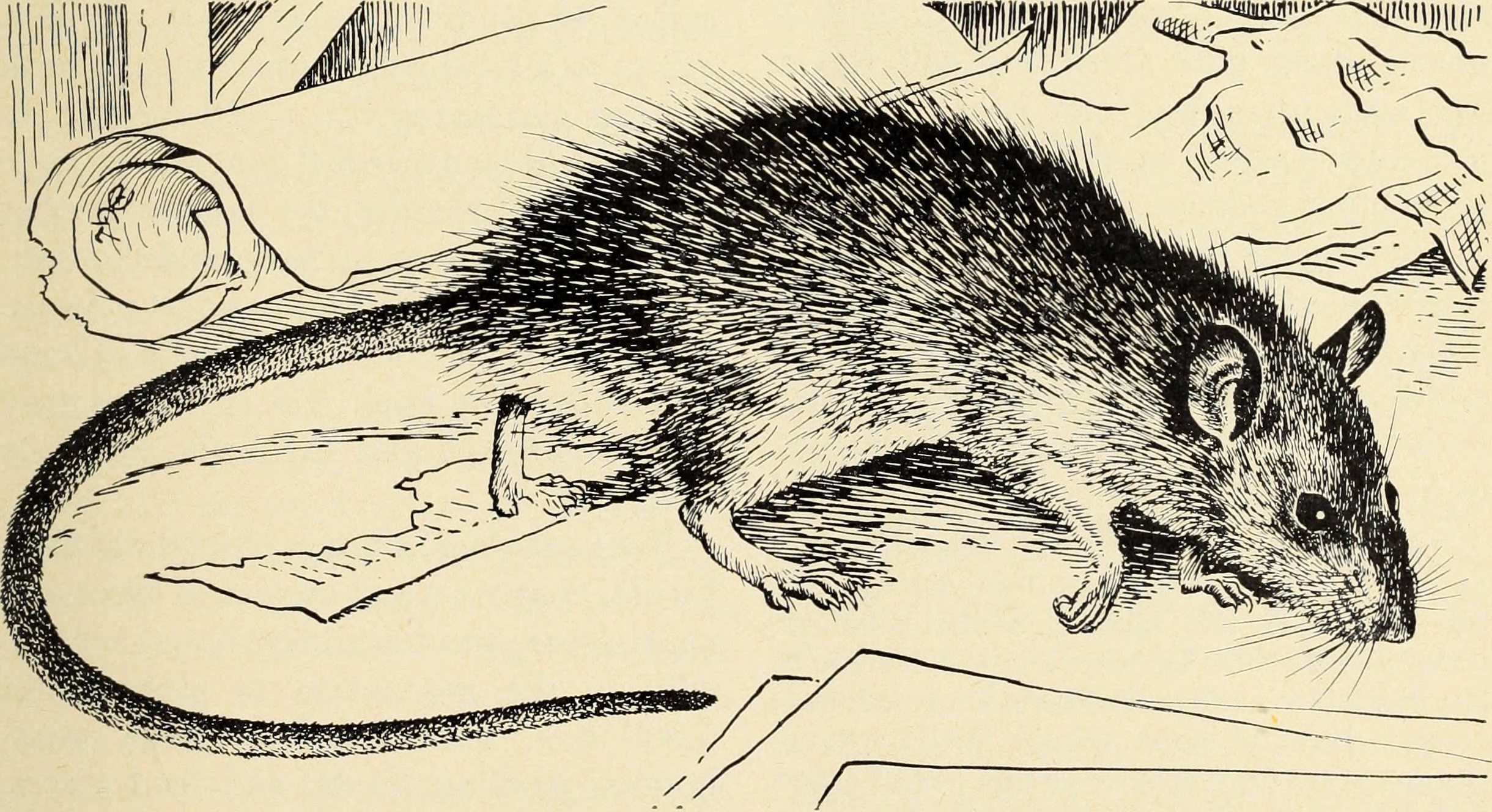
Urban black rats were common and flea bites regularly happened on city streets.

London's outer parish of Stepney was the first to record cases of bubonic plague shortly after the funeral of Queen Elizabeth. The first plague of Stuart England disrupted the coronation of James I, which contemporaries found foreboding for the new king's reign. The disease crept west towards London, and on 1 May deaths were being recorded just outside the city's northern walls in St Botolph-without-Bishopsgate.

The plague spread quickly but stealthily through the large rat populations that lived off the filth. Local physician Thomas Lodge writes in his Treatise of the Plague that "For where the infestation most rageth, poverty reigns among the Commons..." Orders to shutter theatres were given and remained in place for nearly a year.

By summer the plague had begun to interfere more with daily life. The Trinity law sessions were suspended on 23 June, and by 10 July most people were avoiding St Paul's Cathedral. The coronation of James VI and Anne of Denmark went ahead on 25 July.

650 of 674 deaths during September in Stepney parish were from the plague. The plague was particularly lethal to younger people in St. Botolph's, with the parish recording 979 deaths of individuals between one and 24 years old. Some of the symptoms that were saw in these people, were high fever, boils, cough, and bleeding.

The royal family and court moved to Hampshire, in the belief that the area were more healthy. When King James was at Woodstock Palace in September 1603, Spanish and Flemish diplomats lodged at Jesus College, Oxford. A servant of the Spanish ambassador Juan de Tassis, 1st Count of Villamediana died in Oxford, and the diplomats were moved to Southampton. Prince Henry moved to Winchester, where his mother welcomed him with a masque.

During the Elizabethan years, London's theatres were closed to slow the spread of the plague. Theatres were a major gathering and social hub for people during this period. However, public attitudes towards theatergoing and actors soured as these venues became associated with the epidemic. The closures disrupted the careers of playwrights like William Shakespeare and Thomas Dekker, the latter of whom felt inspired by the turbulence to write The Wonderfull Yeare.

In March 1604, the plague was said to be "stayed in the city and suburbs", and people now came to London "without fear or hurt". One of the last casualties was a servant of Anne of Denmark, a quarter waiter called Watson. A Royal Entry to London, deferred from the July coronation, was held on 15 April 1604.

== Aftermath ==
London's government became more aware of the link between the city's recurring plague outbreaks and the filth that blighted the city. While plague could and did strike any class, poor populations where dirty conditions prevailed had suffered greater losses than the cleaner areas of the city. When news of London's plague subsiding reached the countryside, opportunistic traders quickly moved from rural areas to London to fill in the void left by those who'd deceased or fled. London's status as England's economic powerhouse continued despite semi-generational plague epidemics like 1603. The 1603 epidemic even influenced the King James Bible as King James, like many of his contemporaries, interpreted the disease to be a weapon of God's anger: "Behold, with a great plague with the Lord smite... a great catastrophe that could strike a city."

The plague remained endemic in London with outbreaks of varying virulence returning in the years that followed. London's Bills of Mortality for the middle of the decade show 900 plague deaths in 1604, 400 in 1605, and a spike to 2000 plague deaths in 1606.
