= William Fowler (makar) =

Scottish poet and makar

William Fowler (c. 1560 – 1612) was a Scottish poet or makar (royal bard), writer, courtier and translator.

== Early life ==
William Fowler was the son of Janet Fockart and William Fowler, a well-connected Edinburgh merchant burgess who sold a variety of fine fabrics. His father was a treasurer of the French revenues of Mary, Queen of Scots and made payments for her royal guard. He sent £500 Scots to Mary when she was at Perth in April 1564.

William Fowler, the poet, graduated from St Leonard's College, St Andrews in 1578. By 1581 he was in Paris studying civil law. At this time he published An ansvver to the calumnious letter and erroneous propositions of an apostat named M. Io. Hammiltoun a pamphlet criticising John Hamilton and other Catholics in Scotland, who he claimed had driven him from that country. In response, two Scottish Catholics, Hamilton and Hay, manhandled him and dragged him through the streets to the Collège de Navarre.

== London and secret correspondence ==
Following his return to Scotland, he visited London to retrieve some money owed to his father by Mary, Queen of Scots. Here he frequently visited the house of Michel de Castelnau, Sieur de Mauvissiere, where he met Giordano Bruno, currently staying there. He was soon recruited by Francis Walsingham to act as a spy until 1583, by which time he felt his consorting with French Catholics was compromising his religious integrity. Castelnau showed some of Mary's letters to Fowler, and he described them to Walsingham. Fowler also informed on John Mosman, a goldsmith who was carrying Mary's letters.

Fowler's letters to Walsingham mention his widowed mother's concern at his role and intrigues in London and her moneylending activities, and information he obtained in January 1583 from the exiled Scottish Duke of Lennox. The Duke mentioned to Fowler that he recalled staying with his mother when he came to Edinburgh in 1579.

Coded letters mentioning Mary's distrust of Fowler were discovered in the Bibliothèque nationale de France and deciphered in 2023. In May 1583, while William was intriguing in London, his sister Susannah Fowler married John Drummond the king's doorkeeper and son of Robert Drummond of Carnock, their son was the poet William Drummond of Hawthornden.

== A Career at Court ==
In September 1584, he met the German traveller Lupold von Wedel in Edinburgh and told him that he been teaching King James the art of memory. Fowler later noted that while he was teaching James the art of memory, the king taught him poetry and imprese or emblems.

Fowler was part of a literary circle around King James which has become known as the "Castalian Band" and included Alexander Montgomerie, John Stewart of Baldynneis, Alexander Hume, Thomas and Robert Hudson, and James VI himself. In 1591 Fowler contributed a prefatory sonnet To the Only Royal Poet to James VI's poem the Furies, printed in His Majesties Poeticall Exercises; while James, in return, commended, in verse, Fowler's Triumphs of Petrarke.

Fowler dedicated his Triumphs to Jean Fleming, wife of the Chancellor, John Maitland of Thirlestane. Mary Beaton, Lady Boyne the former companion of Mary, Queen of Scots, and "E. D.", probably Elizabeth Douglas, wife of Samuel Cockburn of Temple-Hall, contributed sonnets in praise of the author. Fowler dedicated a translation from Ariosto to Mary Beaton, who was a member of his literary circle. He wrote an epitaph for Elizabeth Douglas, Samuel Cockburn's wife, who died in 1594.

== Secretary to the queen ==
In 1589, he was appointed to the diplomatic mission to Denmark to arrange the marriage of James VI to Anne of Denmark with John Skene. Fowler was a paid negotiator for the city of Edinburgh, charged with raising the profile of the burgh. John Craig wrote to Tycho Brahe to introduce the members of this embassy. He included Fowler's name in a postscript, saying he was a young man worthy of friendship.

Fowler wrote from Denmark about the progress of the marriage negotiations to the English ambassador in Scotland William Ashby who forwarded his letter to William Cecil.

King James sailed to Norway to meet his bride. On 28 November 1589, at Oslo, Fowler was appointed private secretary and Master of Requests to Anne of Denmark. He retained these positions when Anne went to England.

Fowler returned to Scotland before James VI, and planned to rejoin the royal party in Denmark in April 1590. The English diplomat in Edinburgh Robert Bowes reported to Burghley and Walsingham that Fowler had obtained two letters in cipher, one to the Earl of Erroll and the other mysteriously addressed to "Assuerus the Painter". Fowler gave the letters to the Provost of Edinburgh, Sir John Arnot to show them to the Privy Council. The Earl of Bothwell said the letters meant nothing to him, Bowes thought they looked like letters he had previously seen which referred to alleged Catholic and Spanish plots.

Fowler left Scotland for a while on 17 September 1591 with the Laird of Buccleuch, and seems to have attended the University of Padua. At this time Giacomo Castelvetro, an Italian writer, served James VI and Anne of Denmark as a language tutor and secretary. He lodged at Janet Fockart's house where the ambassador Robert Bowes stayed, and Bowes's wife made friends with his wife, Isotta de Canonici, the widow of Thomas Erastus.

Fowler taught the queen the art of memory, a subject upon which he also wrote a now lost treatise. John Geddie, a calligrapher, was also a secretary to the queen. He drew out a Latin acrostic poem for a manuscript of Fowler's discourse on the history of mathematics titled 'Methodi, sive compendii mathematici'. This work was not printed.

Fowler devised and wrote an account of the entertainments at the baptism of Prince Henry in 1594. At the feast following the baptism at Stirling Castle, a "Moore or Blackamoor" dragged a pageant cart with six ladies holding desserts towards the dais or high table in the great hall. He pretended to pull the stage with draught traces fashioned like gold chains. It was really winched or pushed by hidden workmen. Fowler said the pageant was propelled by "secret convoy". His performance was a last-minute substitute for a lion. Perhaps this actor was the same Afro-Scot as the man in the pageant in the streets of Edinburgh for Anne in May 1590. The women represented Ceres, Fecundity, Faith, Concord, Liberality, and Perseverance.

In April 1595, the queen went to Stirling to see her son Prince Henry. She had joined a factional struggle, and the court at Stirling was filled with her adversaries. Roger Aston wrote that Fowler had stayed behind in Edinburgh for this reason.

In 1598, Fowler agreed to send intelligence from the royal court to England, and was to be known by the cipher 'Ib' in correspondence. George Nicholson mentioned in March that Fowler needed encouragement and reassurance by a letter from the Secretary, Sir Robert Cecil. However, nothing from him or mentioning 'Ib' survives, except perhaps a newsletter of March 1602 that reached Sir Robert Cecil and appears to be in his handwriting. In October 1602, Fowler went to Ostend to meet the Laird of Buccleuch.

Shortly after the Union of the Crowns, on 5 April 1603, before joining the king in London, Fowler wrote a note describing the devices or emblems embroidered on a bed belonging to Mary, Queen of Scots, which seems to have been in place in a chamber at Holyrood Palace with matching chairs. The bed was also recorded by his nephew, William Drummond of Hawthornden. On 28 April he wrote to Robert Cecil from Edinburgh, enclosing royal letters (from Anne of Denmark) and offering his service.

== England ==
At the Union of Crowns, Fowler travelled south with Anne of Denmark and met the Earl of Shewsbury at Worksop Manor. Shrewsbury would remain a friend and ally. Fowler was confirmed as secretary and Master of Requests to Anne of Denmark, and joined the council administering her new English jointure lands. He joined the royal progress towards Wilton House in Somerset, and on 12 August visited Loseley Park where a timepiece inspired his poem, Uppon a Horologe of the Clock at Sir George More's at his Place of Loseley.

In September 1603, he met Arbella Stuart at Woodstock Palace, and wrote two sonnets, one addressed to her, and the Upon a Horologe of the Clock at Loseley which contains a partial anagram of her name. Fowler sent the sonnets to the Earl and Countess of Shrewsbury and wrote that Arbella was the "eighth wonder of the world" and "the phoenix of her sex". He wrote to Earl from Winchester on 11 October, with news of the death of Alexander Dicsone. Arbella Stuart advised the Earl of Shrewsbury to send a New Year's Day gift to Anne of Denmark, but not to Fowler, as gift giving could become a "yearly tribute". Arbella forwarded letters from Fowler to the Earl.

On 26 May 1604, Fowler wrote to Lord Cecil apologising for delays in expediting Anna of Denmark's business. He said suits and patents were "in the custody of the women" and he blamed "Margarete" who usurped authority in the queen's name, meaning the Scottish chamberer Margaret Hartsyde. In July, at Greenwich Palace, he drew up the queen's warrant in support of founding a college or university at Ripon in Yorkshire, which was promoted by Cecily Sandys, widow of the Bishop Edwin Sandys, and supported by Bess of Hardwick. Nothing seems to have resulted from this. In October 1604 he wrote to the Earl of Shrewsbury from Hampton Court with court news and news of death of the son of the Earl of Dunbar, who he called "our great St George, the Lord of Berwick."

Prince Henry was given a miniature ship, the Disdain in 1604, and later, the Prince Royal converted by Phineas Pett from the Victory. Notes in Fowler's manuscripts show that he chose suitable Latin verses from Virgil's Georgics to include in their painted decoration or be used as mottoes at their launch.

Fowler wrote to Cecil in February 1605 mentioning their recent meeting at Woodstock Palace. Anne of Denmark had placed in his custody portraits of Albert VII, Archduke of Austria and Isabella Clara Eugenia. They had been gifts to her from the Flemish ambassador, the Count of Arenberg, in September 1603. She was considering giving them to a friend in Scotland. Fowler thought they would be better at Cecil's house, Theobalds. In the mean time the pictures were to be displayed in the gallery at Somerset House. Fowler attended the royal progress in 1605 and was at Drayton, Lord Mordaunt's house in August. Fowler wrote two poems to Mary Middlemore, a lady in waiting in the queen's household, one including her name, "My harte as Aetna burnes, and suffers MORE / Paines in my MIDDLE than ever MARY proved".

The French ambassador Antoine Lefèvre de la Boderie regarded Fowler as a useful source of information, worthy of cultivation, describing him as an "Ecossais et un galant homme, que je desir bien entretenir". In August 1607, Boderie recommended that Henry IV of France should send Fowler 5 or 600 Écu as a reward. Fowler composed anagrams and sayings based on courtier's and diplomats names, and Boderie features in Fowler's drafts.

=== The Queen's council and John Donne ===
The Queen's Council managed the income from her extensive jointure lands and manors in England. Fowler's papers include the draft invitation for the council appointees representing shire manors to come to court. His administrative work with the queen's council and household under the chamberlain Viscount Lisle included checking bills submitted by Robert Henlake, a maker of musical instruments who repaired a wind instrument belonging to Anne of Denmark at Hampton Court in August and September 1607.

His older brother William Fowler, an Edinburgh merchant, died in 1606, and the poet was made a burgess of Edinburgh. In June 1607, the poet John Donne had some hopes of gaining a position in the queen's household by Fowler's means, and heard from a clerk of her council, Daniel Powell, that Fowler might retire. Donne wrote to Henry Goodyer, a gentleman of the king's privy chamber, about his interest in employment in the queen's household in June 1607, fearing that Fowler's retirement might scupper his chances, but no more is known and Fowler did not retire. The rumour of retirement was perhaps connected with death of Fowler's brother in Edinburgh. Fowler returned from Edinburgh in November 1607. The Earl of Shrewsbury supported Fowler at this time, and wrote to the Earl of Salisbury about Fowler's absences in Scotland and his illness from a fever.

== Last years and death ==
He was at court in May 1609 at Greenwich Palace. In 1609 Fowler received a grant of 2,000 acres (8.1 km^{2}) in Ulster as reward for his services to Anne of Denmark. In October 1610 he answered William Trumbull's inquiry about the Scottish Order of the Thistle, an order of knighthood of doubtful history. Fowler believed that there had been an Order, founded to honour Scots who fought for Charles VII of France. He thought it had been discontinued in the time of James V, and could say nothing of its ceremonies or regalia.

He died in 1612 and was buried in St Margaret's, Westminster.

His will mentions a chain of gold of jewels worth £300, and three diamond rings, presents from Anne of Denmark, which he left to his brother John Fowler. The Earl of Shrewsbury owed him £843. The will was witnessed by James Cleghorn, a waiter in the queen's household, and James Gibson, the king's bookbinder.

== The green tree and the anagram ==
At Denmark House, the queen had a green palm tree with a crown and a Latin epigram in gilt letters on the queen's fruitfulness by Fowler based on his anagram of her name; "Anna Brittanorum Regina"—"In anna regnantium arbor". The anagram was printed in Henry Peacham's Minerva Brittana (London, 1612), attributed to Fowler, with an image of an olive tree bearing the initials of Henry, Charles and Elizabeth. The verse on the tree was:

Perpetuo vernans arbor regnantium in Anna,
Fert fructum et frondes, germine laeta vivo.

Fowler's own translation was:

Freshe budding blooming trie,
from ANNA faire which springs,
Growe on blist birth with leaves and fruit,
from branche to branche in kings.

The palm tree was admired and described by John Ernest I, Duke of Saxe-Weimar who visited London in 1613. This seems to have been a salt, described in 1620 with other items of the queen's tableware scheduled for sale as; " a salt of gold in pieces, having a clock within crystal, the foot of same being gold triangle wise, the cover thereof being a castle, and out of the same castle a green tree, the flowers being diamonds and rubies in roses, the same clock salt and crystal garnished with gold, diamonds, and rubies, wanting a dial in the same clock".

The figurative image of Anne of Denmark as a fruitful vine, an olive tree with four branches, was used in a speech in parliament made after the Gunpowder Plot by Thomas Egerton, 1st Viscount Brackley as Lord Chancellor.

== Legacy ==
His nephew William Drummond of Hawthornden bequeathed a manuscript collection of seventy-two sonnets, entitled The Tarantula of Love, and a translation (1587) from the Italian of the Triumphs of Petrarke to the library of the University of Edinburgh. Two other volumes of his manuscript notes, poems and other papers. are preserved among the Drummond of Hawthornden manuscripts held by the National Library of Scotland. Fowler's poetry was featured in the 1803 publication by John Leyden of Scottish Descriptive Poems.

== Family ==
William Fowler's children included;

- A daughter who married James Ruch.
- A daughter who married Patrick Stirling.
- Ludovick Fowler, burgess of Haddington and owner of the Deanery at Restalrig. He married Jean Cathcart in 1622.
- Anna Fowler. After the death of her husband, a Mr Delille, she lived in Cambridge in 1665 in poverty and sent begging letters to William Sancroft, Dean of St Paul's.

== Editions ==
- A True Reportarie of the Most Triumphant, and Royal Accomplishment of the Baptisme of the Most Excellent, Right High, and Mightie Prince, Frederik Henry, By the Grace of God, Prince of Scotland. Solemnized the 30 Day of August 1594, Robert Waldegrave, Edinburgh (1594)
- Henry Meikle, ed., The Works of William Fowler, 3 vols, vol. I 1914, vol. II 1936, vol. III 1940, Scottish Text Society, Edinburgh
