= Richard Corbet =

English clergyman

- Bishop of Norwich
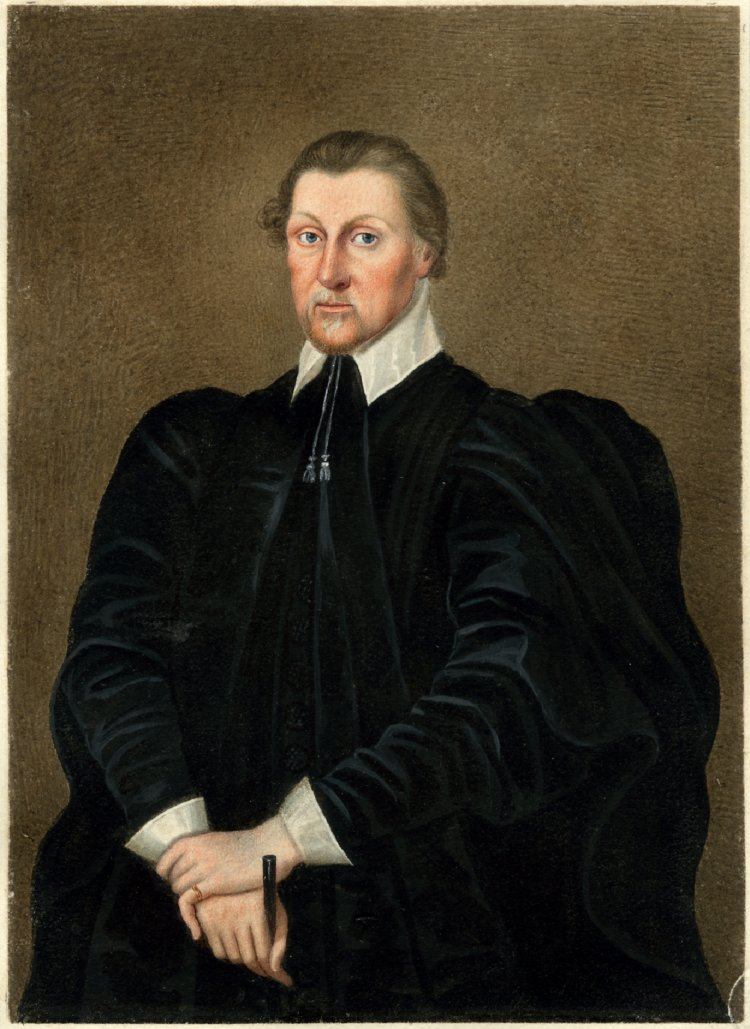
- Portrait of Corbet by Sylvester Harding
- Diocese: Diocese of Norwich
- In office: 7 May 1632 – 1635 (death)
- Predecessor: Francis White
- Successor: Matthew Wren
- Other posts: Dean of Christ Church (1620–1628); Bishop of Oxford (1628–1632)

Orders
- Ordination: 26 March 1613 (deacon & priest) by John Bridges
- Consecration: 1628

Personal details
- Born: 1582
- Died: 28 July 1635 (aged 52–53) Norwich, Norfolk, England
- Denomination: Anglican

Bishop Richard Corbet (or Corbett) (1582 – 28 July 1635) was an English clergyman who rose to be a bishop in the Church of England. He is also remembered as a humorist and as a poet, although his work was not published until after his death.

== Life ==
He was born in Ewell in Surrey the son of a prominent nurseryman in Twickenham, Richard Corbet was educated at Westminster School and then studied at both Broadgates Hall and Christ Church, Oxford, gaining his Master of Arts (MA) in 1605.

Having then taken holy orders (he was, irregularly, ordained both deacon and priest on the same day, 26 March 1613, by John Bridges, Bishop of Oxford), he became a Doctor of Divinity (DD) in 1617. In consideration of his preaching, which included an oration on the death of the heir to the throne (Henry Frederick, Prince of Wales), James VI and I made him one of the royal chaplains. He also held a number of other positions, including Dean of Christ Church (1620–28), later becoming Bishop of Oxford (1628) and then Bishop of Norwich (1632). He was nominated to the See of Oxford on 30 July 1628 and translated to Norwich on 7 May 1632. He was generally an easy-going man and, although he was anti-Puritan and wrote against them, did little to repress Puritan activities around Norwich when William Laud, Archbishop of Canterbury, began his campaign against them.

Corbet was also renowned for his humour and many anecdotes were told of him throughout his career. One of those recorded by John Aubrey recalls how "On a market-day he and some of his comrades were at the taverne by the Crosse… The ballad-singer complayned he had no custome, he could not put off his ballads. The jolly Doctor puts off his gowne, and puts on the ballad-singer's leathern jacket, and being a handsome man, and a rare full voice, he presently vended a great many, and had a great audience.

Later he appropriated the form of the sung ballad so as to break down the distinction between different kinds of audience and make its intermediary possibilities available for wider dispersal of his particular views. One included "The Distracted Puritan", with its satirical characterisation of ostentatious religiosity. Though written in the form of a personal justification, its setting to the tune Tom O' Bedlam, a frequent accompaniment to ballads about madness, signals how the words are really to be taken. Another line of attack occurs in his "A proper new ballad entitled Fairies’ Farewell", a lament for folk tradition undermined by Puritan prohibitions. Frequent later reprintings have treated it as a piece of charming lore, but the choice of a tune originally associated with lament makes its message clear. The true subject is social friction and the breakdown of trust that has brought.

== Poetry ==
Corbet spent much of his life in Oxford, where it is possible that he knew the younger men Henry King and Jasper Mayne, both educated like him at Westminster School and Christ Church, and fellow contributors of poetical tributes to Donne's collected poems. Certainly he knew Ben Jonson, whom he was partly instrumental in inviting to Oxford in 1616. Jonson also wrote a companion piece to Corbet's own poetical tribute to his father Vincent after his death in 1619.

In his own day, Corbet's reputation was high and his poems were circulated widely in manuscript. Most, according to Anthony Wood, were "made in his younger years, and never intended to be published". Their first book publication was in Certain Elegant Poems (London, 1647), edited by John Donne the Younger. This was little more than a patchwork of twenty-two poor and sometimes spurious texts. Poëtica Stromata, a second and entirely separate foreign edition appeared in the following year, consisting of twenty-five poems (only fourteen of which had appeared in the 1647 edition). After another London edition in 1672, there were no more until the augmented fourth edition of Octavius Gilchrist (London 1807). In the 20th century there was a scholarly edition by J A W Bennett and Hugh Trevor-Roper (Oxford 1955).

Humour often characterised his written work. In a prose appeal for the refurbishment of St Paul's Cathedral, he described how the building had suffered a double martyrdom by fire and continues: “Saint Paul complained of stoning twice; his church of firing: stoning she wants indeed, and a good stoning would repair her.” His elegy for John Donne, the dean of St Paul's, makes the same point as many others accompanying the posthumous collection of Donne's poems. To write on this subject, one must first be like the author, he argues, but then concludes that since Donne is now dead he would rather not proceed so far. The scholar J. M. Cowper speculated that Corbet was the author of The Times' Whistle, a collection of satires collected between 1614 and 1616 under the pseudonym "R. C., Gent."; this attribution has been disputed by other scholars.

Some of Corbet's poems have the same uneven rhythms of Donne and other contemporary writers, and are touched by the same Baroque spirit of exaggeration. A fair example occurs in "An elegy upon the Lady Haddington, who died of the small-pox", where the disease is addressed thus:

Thou, that of faces honeycombs dost make,
And of two breasts two cullenders, forsake
Thy deadly trade: thou now art rich; give o’er,
And let our curses call thee forth no more;
Or if thou needs wilt magnify thy power,
Go where thou art invoked every hour –
Amongst the gamesters, where they name thee thick.

He wrote several more elegies besides and joined with fellow wits in making fun of Thomas Coryat’s Crudities (Poems 1807, pp.11–12). Verse letters indicate the Court circle of royal favourites and their dependents among whom he moved, being addressed to John Mordaunt, 1st Earl of Peterborough, George Villiers, 1st Duke of Buckingham, and Thomas Aylesbury. His more original subjects are accounts of journeys: the burlesque "Journey to France" (Poems 1807, p.94 ff), and the satirical account of a tour from Oxford to Newark, "Iter Boreale" (p.171ff). Much else is occasional and his authorship is often more a matter of ascription than certainty.

== See also ==
- The Poems of Richard Corbet (1807)
- Richard Corbett, Bishop of Oxford and Norwich, Catalogue of English Literary Manuscripts
