= John Donne (disambiguation) =

John Donne (1573–1631) was a poet.

John Donne is also the name of:

- Sir John Donne (1420s–1503), Welsh courtier and diplomat
- John Donne the Younger (1604–1662), son of the poet

== See also ==
- John Done (c. 1747–1831), Justice of the Maryland Court of Appeals
