= Henry Frederick, Prince of Wales =

Heir apparent of James VI and I (1594–1612)

Henry Frederick
- Prince of Wales (more)
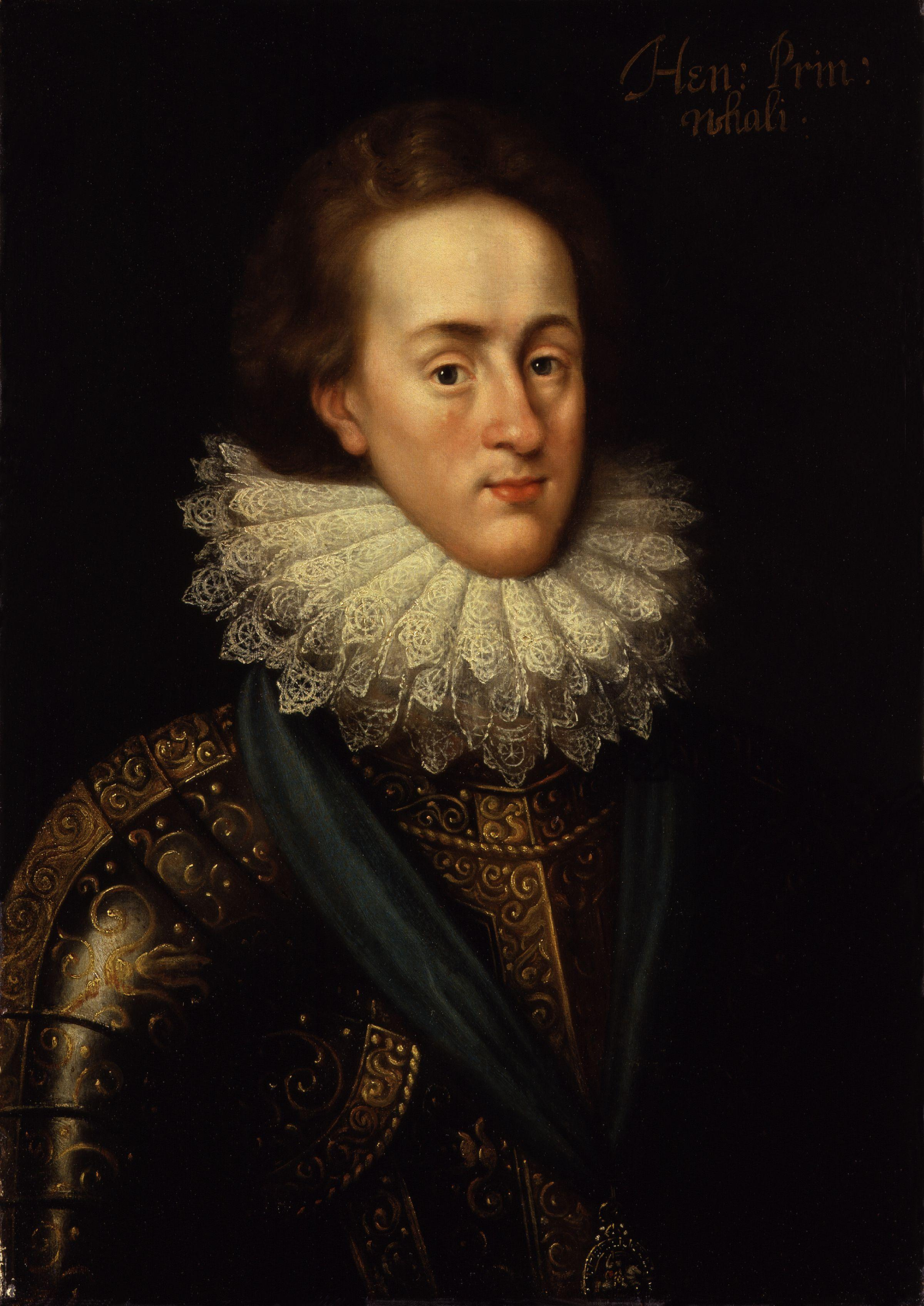
- Portrait after Isaac Oliver, c. 1610
- Born: 19 February 1594; Stirling Castle, Stirling, Scotland
- Died: 6 November 1612 (aged 18); St James's Palace, London, England
- Burial: 8 December 1612; Westminster Abbey in the Mary, Queen of Scots vault
- House: Stuart
- Father: James VI and I
- Mother: Anne of Denmark

Henry Frederick, Prince of Wales KG (19 February 1594 – 6 November 1612) was the eldest son and heir apparent of King James VI and I and Anne of Denmark. His name derives from his grandfathers: Henry Stuart, Lord Darnley; and Frederick II of Denmark. Prince Henry was widely seen as a bright and promising heir to the English, Irish, and Scottish thrones. However, at the age of 18, he predeceased his father, dying of typhoid fever. His younger brother, the future Charles I, succeeded him as heir apparent to the thrones.

== Early life ==
Henry was born on 19 February 1594 at Stirling Castle, Scotland, and automatically received the titles Duke of Rothesay, Earl of Carrick, Baron of Renfrew, Lord of the Isles, and Prince and Great Steward of Scotland at birth. His nurses included Mistress Primrose and Mistress Bruce.

His baptism, held on 30 August 1594, was celebrated with elaborate theatrical entertainments written by the poet William Fowler and took place in a newly constructed Chapel Royal at Stirling, purpose-built by William Schaw. Ambassadors were given portraits of Henry depicting him as "a fine thriving child". To cover the expenses, James VI imposed a tax of £100,000. Textiles and costumes for the event were purchased using the dowry of £100,000 Scots belonging to Anne, which had been held in trust by various towns. In the month leading up to the baptism, rumours circulated at the Scottish court that King James was jealous of Queen Anne and suspected that Ludovic Stewart, Duke of Lennox might be Henry’s biological father.

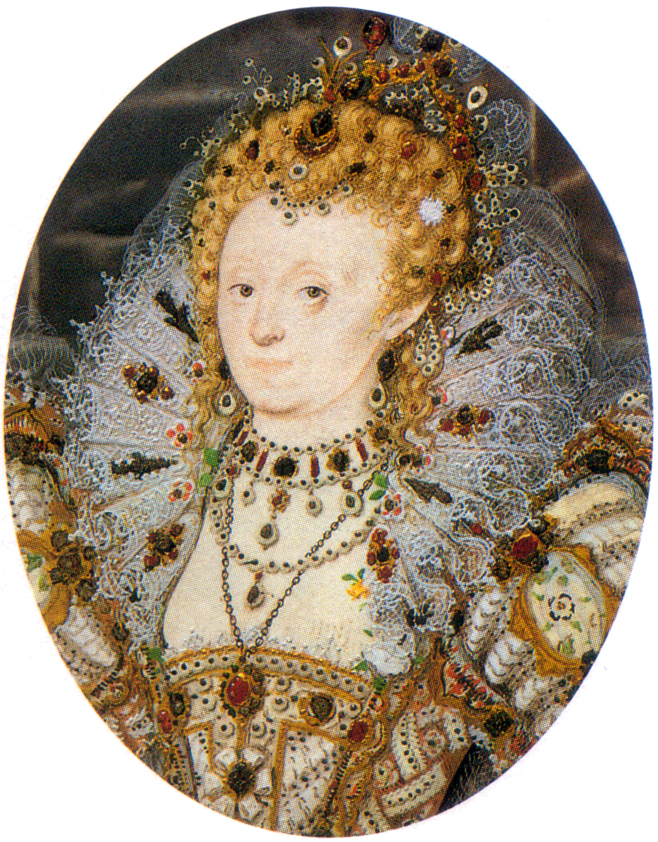
Elizabeth I sent a miniature portrait by Nicholas Hilliard to Prince Henry.

James placed the prince in the care of John Erskine, Earl of Mar, and his mother Annabell Murray at Stirling Castle, out of the care of Queen Anne. James worried that Anne's tendency toward Catholicism might affect Henry. The child's removal to Stirling caused enormous tension between Anne and James, and Henry remained there under the care of Mar's family until 1603. James VI wrote a note to the Earl of Mar in June 1595 instructing him, in the event of his death, not to deliver Henry to Anne of Denmark or the Parliament of Scotland until he was 18 and gave the order himself.

Anne was reluctant to go to Stirling and was said to be afraid that her enemies would give her a poisoned posset at the Castle. James frequently visited the prince, and travelled to Stirling for his son's first birthday. As early as August 1595, James encouraged the infant to hold a pen and make a penstroke on a document, which the king humorously certified, "I will testify this is the prince's own mark".

The prince had silver candlesticks, a silver cup and a silver plate with a salt cellar. Elizabeth I contributed to the expenses at Stirling, paying £5000 Scots in 1595. At this time, Patrick Gray, Master of Gray, was keeper of Henry's wardrobe, and took delivery of a little coffer worth £8 Scots for the prince's clothes. Adam Newton became his schoolmaster or tutor. William Keith of Delny and then George Lauder were his legal tutors, administrators of his estates and incomes.

In 1596 Queen Elizabeth, via Robert Devereux, Earl of Essex, and his secretary Anthony Bacon, sent her miniature portrait by Nicholas Hilliard to Prince Henry, and this was received by the Earl of Mar at Stirling. It was said that Henry would be godfather to his younger brother Robert in May 1602 and afterwards stay at Dunfermline Palace with his mother, but James VI forbade this.

Alexander Wilson became Henry's tailor. In 1602 it was planned that Henry would visit his mother at Falkland Palace, but this was postponed because of her sickness. The French ambassador in London Christophe de Harlay, Count of Beaumont, reported a rumour, spread by James's friends, that Anne of Denmark was cruel and ambitious, and hoped to rule Scotland as regent or governor for Henry after the death of her husband.

== London ==
James became king of England in 1603 at the Union of the Crowns and his family moved south. Queen Anne came to Stirling to collect her son, and after an argument with the prince's keepers, Marie Stewart, Countess of Mar and the Master of Mar, was allowed to take Henry to Edinburgh on 28 May. On the following Sunday Anne took him to St Giles Kirk in her silver coach. Anne and Henry arrived in England, at the fortified town of Berwick-upon-Tweed, on 1 June.

Henry's tutor Adam Newton continued to serve the prince, and several Scottish servants from the Stirling household were retained, including the poet David Murray. The prince was lodged at Oatlands and Nonsuch Palace, and was relocated to Winchester during an outbreak of plague. At Winchester, in September 1603, Queen Anne produced a masque to welcome her son, which was controversial. In November 1603 he was staying at Wilton House, and King James joked that a letter presented to Henry by the Venetian diplomats was bigger than he was. Henry rode with the Earl of Nottingham and his governor Sir Thomas Chaloner to Salisbury to dine with the Venetian ambassador Nicolò Molin and other diplomats. This was the first time he had made an appearance and dined outside the royal household, and his father joked that Henry was the ambassador's prisoner.

On 15 March 1604, Henry rode on horseback behind his father through the streets of London during the delayed Royal Entry. From 1604 onwards, Henry often stayed at St James's Palace. Alphonsus Fowle improved the gardens for him. Henry's daily expenses in England were managed by the Cofferer of the Household, Henry Cocke and after 1610 David Foulis. David Murray of Gorthy was keeper of the prince's privy purse and his accounts reveal some details of Henry's interests.

Two Scottish tailors, Alexander Wilson and Patrick Black, moved to London and made the prince's clothes. Wilson made him doublets and hose from cloth supplied by Robert Grigge, and a hunting coat of green chamlet lined with velvet. The prince was supplied with perfumed gloves made of stag's leather, perfumed gloves from Córdoba, and embroidered waistcoats "wrought very curiously in colour silks".

== Music, games and sports ==
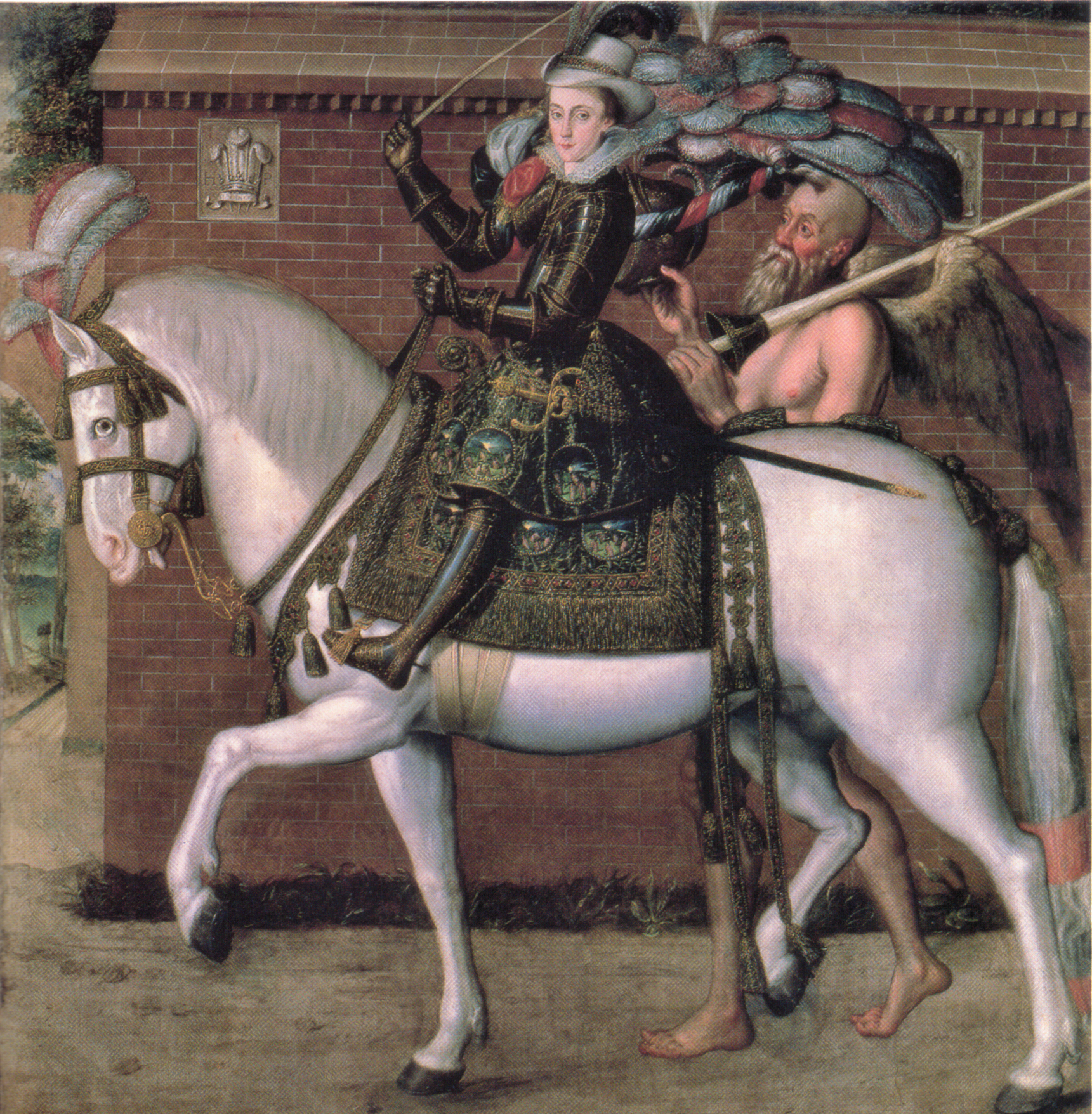
Henry, Prince of Wales, on Horseback, by Robert Peake the Elder

Prince Henry was introduced to a variety of sports at Stirling Castle. In September 1600 he was bought two golf clubs, two staffs, and four rackets. The handles were covered with velvet and dressed with metal passementerie. In September 1601, an English visitor, Thomas Musgrave, saw Henry dance, leap, and wield a pike. On Sunday 8 May 1603 Henry exercised in the castle garden, watched by his mother, played billiards after dinner, and after supper "ran and played at the boards". Henry had a huntsman, Thomas Pott, who continued to serve him in England. Pott travelled abroad several times, taking gifts of dogs from the young prince to European rulers.

Henry was tutored in music by Alfonso Ferrabosco the younger, Nicholas Villiard, and Walter Quinn. Thomas Giles taught him to dance. In August 1604 Henry danced for the Spanish envoy, the Constable Velasco, and showed him military pike exercises in the palace garden. Charles Guerolt taught Henry the "science of defence", fencing. At Oatlands in 1603 Prince Henry told Scaramelli, a Venetian diplomat, about his interests in dancing, tennis and hunting. George Moncrieff was his falconer and kept his hawks.

In 1606 the French ambassador Antoine Lefèvre de la Boderie saw Prince Henry tossing the pike as a military exercise after two hours of study. Boderie noted that Henry played golf, which he described as a Scottish game not unlike "pallemail" or pall-mall. One of Prince Henry's biographers, "W. H.", mentioned that Henry nearly hit Adam Newton with a golf ball, and Henry said that would have paid him back. Henry also played tennis, and in July 1606 played with his uncle Christian IV of Denmark at Greenwich Palace. He had a court for "pall-mall", laid out at St James's Fields, north of St James's Palace. It was a long alley surfaced with cockle shells crushed into clay or loam.

Henry was given a miniature ship, the Disdain specially made in 1604 by Phineas Pett, and later, the Prince Royal, converted by Pett from the smaller Victory. His mother's secretary William Fowler chose Latin verses to include in their painted decoration. In 1607, Henry sought permission to learn to swim, but the Earls of Suffolk and Shrewsbury wrote to Newton that swimming was a "dangerous thing" that their own sons might practise "like feathers as light as things of nought", but was not suitable for princes as "things of great weight and consequence".

A riding school, one of the first in England, was built for him at St James's Palace in 1607. Robert Douglas was the prince's master of horse by 1610. Henry competed at running at the ring with foreign visitors and diplomats including Louis Frederick, Duke of Württemberg-Montbéliard, in April and May 1610. Henry talked of the merits of various breeds of horses and his own Barbary horses to the Venetian ambassador Antonio Foscarini in 1611.

In March 1609, Henry was entertained by a man with a baboon. He revealed an interest in Venetian maritime power and had a plan of the fortification of Palmanova. As an indoor amusement, Henry played chess.

== Literature in the schoolroom ==
In England, Henry's writing masters included Peter Bales, who practiced "small writing" and made a miniature copy of the king's book of advice, the Basilicon Doron for him to wear as a tablet book. Bales encouraged Henry to copy improving Latin phrases, known as sententiae. Henry translated works by Guy Du Faur, Seigneur de Pibrac and sent them to his mother, Anne of Denmark. He was a patron of Joshua Sylvester, who translated the poems of Guillaume de Salluste Du Bartas. Henry started to translate Sylvester's version into Latin to present to his father. He paid £100 to George Heriot for a diamond ring sent to his friend the essayist John Harington of Kelston, who sent him a translation of the sixth book of the Aeneid with notes referring to his father's Basilicon Doron. Henry seems not to have studied ancient Greek authors, but he apparently encouraged the translation project of George Chapman (Chapman dedicated his translations of The Iliad and The Odyssey to Prince Henry, but his Odyssey was not completed until after Henry's death.). He told the Venetian ambassador he would learn modern Italian. Esther Inglis presented him with miniature manuscript books, including A Book of the Armes of England, as a New Year's Day gift for which he rewarded her £5. The Venetian ambassador, Nicolò Molin, judged that Henry learnt under the impetus of his father's spur, rather than his own inclination, and his brother Charles, Duke of York, was more earnest in his studies.

== Training and personality ==
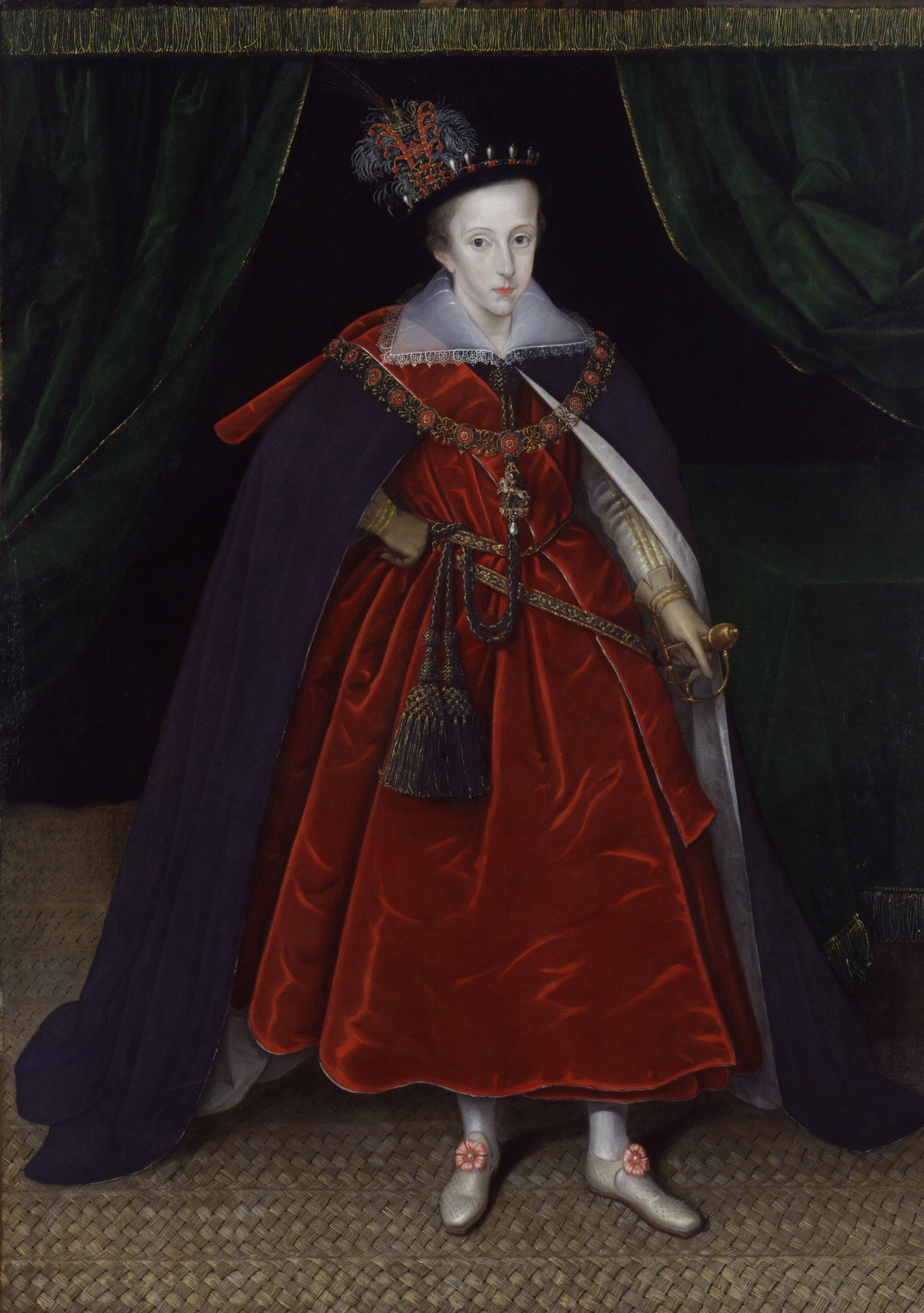
Portrait by Marcus Gheeraerts the Younger, c. 1603

King James greatly preferred the role of schoolmaster to that of father, and he wrote texts for the schooling of his children. He directed that Henry's household "should rather imitate a College than a Court". During a royal visit to Oxford in August 1605, Henry was ceremonially matriculated at Magdalen College, but it was never intended that he should study there. Thomas Chaloner wrote that the Prince's household was intended by the King for a courtly college or a collegiate court".

Henry passionately engaged in such physical pursuits as hawking, hunting, jousting and fencing, and from a young age studied naval and military affairs and national issues, about which he often disagreed with his father. He also disapproved of the way his father conducted the royal court, disliked Robert Carr, Earl of Somerset, a favourite of his father, and esteemed Walter Raleigh, wishing him to be released from the Tower of London.

The prince's popularity rose so high that it threatened his father. Relations between the two could be tense, and on occasion surfaced in public. At one point, they were hunting near Royston when James criticised his son for lacking enthusiasm for the chase, and initially moved to strike his son with his cane, but Henry rode off. Most of the hunting party then followed Henry.

"Upright to the point of priggishness, he fined all who swore in his presence", according to Charles Carlton, a biographer of Charles I, who describes Henry as an "obdurate Protestant". In addition to the alms box to which Henry forced swearers to contribute, he made sure his household attended church services. His religious views were influenced by the clerics in his household, who came largely from a tradition of politicised Calvinism. Henry listened humbly, attentively, and regularly to the sermons preached to his household, and once told his chaplain, Richard Milbourne, that he esteemed most the preachers whose attitude suggested, "Sir, you must hear me diligently: you must have a care to observe what I say."

Henry is said to have disliked his younger brother Charles and to have teased him, although this derives from only one anecdote: when Charles was nine years of age, Henry snatched the hat off a bishop and put it on his brother's head, then told his brother that when he became king he would make Charles Archbishop of Canterbury, and then Charles would have a long robe to hide his ugly rickety legs. Charles stamped on the cap and had to be dragged off in tears.

== Investiture and leadership ==
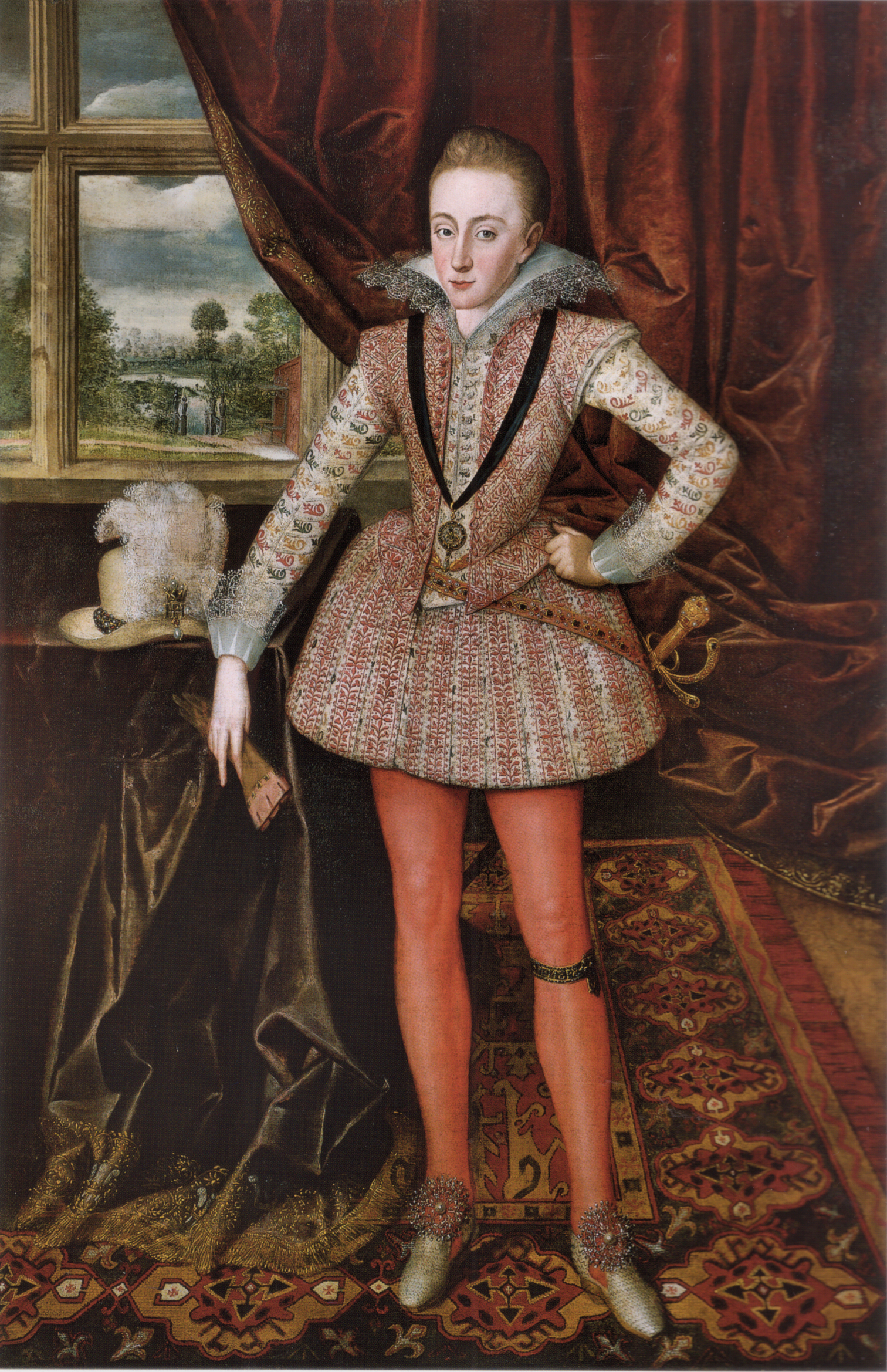
Portrait by Robert Peake the Elder, c. 1610

With his father's accession to the throne of England in 1603, Henry at once became Duke of Cornwall. In 1610 he was further invested as Prince of Wales and Earl of Chester, thus for the first time uniting the six automatic and two traditional Scottish and English titles held by heirs-apparent to the two thrones. The ceremony of investiture was celebrated with a pageant London's Love to Prince Henry, and a masque, Tethys' Festival, during which his mother gave a sword encrusted with diamonds, intended to represent justice.

As a young man, Henry showed great promise and was beginning to be active in leadership matters. Among his activities, he was responsible for the reassignment of Sir Thomas Dale to the Virginia Company of London's struggling colony in North America. The city of Henricus in colonial Virginia was named in his honour in 1611; his name also survives in Henrico County, Virginia, and Cape Henry. He was the "Supreme Protector" of the Company of Discoverers of the Northwest Passage, and a patron of Robert Harcourt's expedition to Guiana.

The Irish Gaelic lord of Inishowen, Sir Cahir O'Doherty, had applied to gain a position as a courtier in the household of Henry, to help him in his struggles against officials in Ireland. Unknown to Sir Cahir, on 19 April 1608, the day he launched O'Doherty's Rebellion by burning Derry, his application was approved. Henry took an interest in the Kingdom of Ireland and was known to be supportive of the idea of a reconciliation with the former rebel Hugh O'Neill, Earl of Tyrone, who had fled into exile during the Flight of the Earls. Because of this Tyrone and his entourage mourned when the prince met his early death.

=== Woodstock and Richmond ===
In 1611, King James gave Woodstock Palace in Oxfordshire to Prince Henry. Henry had a banqueting house built of leafy tree branches in the park, in which he held a dinner for his parents and his sister Princess Elizabeth. David Murray paid 110 shillings for transporting musical instruments from London to Woodstock for the event. Henry planned an ambitious garden for Richmond Palace, employing a Florentine designer and engineer Costantino de' Servi. The garden would have included an oval arena and a pool with a giant statue of Neptune.

=== Marriage negotiations ===
In between 1610 and 1612, potential brides from across Europe were considered for Henry. Cosimo II de' Medici of the House of Medici, and the ruler of the Grand Duchy of Tuscany in what is now Italy, hoped to arrange a royal marriage between Henry and his sister, Caterina de' Medici. To this end, Cosimo II sent fifteen small bronze statues, including one of a trotting horse, designed by Giambologna, a famous sculptor, to the English court in 1611. However, Henry unexpectedly died in 1612, before the marriage negotiations could be finalized. Caterina instead married Ferdinando Gonzaga, Duke of Mantua and Montferrat in 1617.

In May 1612, the Duke of Bouillon came to London as the ambassador of Marie de' Medici, dowager queen of France, and cousin to Cosimo II de' Medici through their paternal grandfather, Cosimo I de' Medici. According to the Venetian ambassador, Antonio Foscarini, his instructions included a proposal of marriage between Prince Henry and Christine, the daughter of Henry IV of France. Queen Anne, Henry's mother, told one of the Duke's senior companions that she would prefer Henry married a French princess without a dowry than a Florentine princess (Caterina de' Medici) with any amount of gold.

With Henry's death, Christine of France instead married Victor Amadeus I, Duke of Savoy, in 1619. His brother Charles, who became the heir apparent to the English and Scottish thrones on his brother's death, fulfilled their mother's wishes by wedding Henrietta Maria of France in 1625.

== Death ==
Henry died from typhoid fever at the age of 18 on 6 November 1612, during the celebrations that led up to the wedding of his sister Elizabeth. (The diagnosis can be made with reasonable certainty from written records of the post-mortem examination, which was ordered to be carried out in order to dispel rumours of poisoning.) His mother, Anne of Denmark, had sent requests to Walter Raleigh in the Tower of London for his special "great cordial", which failed to effect a cure. It was reported that his last words were to ask for his sister Princess Elizabeth, who was discouraged from visiting him by their parents' order for fear of contagion.

After Henry's death, his brother Charles fell ill but was the chief mourner at the funeral, which King James (who detested funerals) refused to attend. The body lay in state at St. James's Palace for four weeks. On 7 December, over a thousand people walked in the mile-long cortège to Westminster Abbey. On top of the coffin there was a wooden effigy of the prince made by Richard Norris, with lifelike features modelled in wax by Abraham van der Doort, clothed in robes of crimson velvet edged with fur. The Archbishop of Canterbury, George Abbot, gave a two-hour sermon. As Henry's body was lowered into the ground, his chief servants broke their staves of office at the grave.

Prince Henry's death was widely regarded as a tragedy for the nation. According to Charles Carlton, "Few heirs to the English throne have been as widely and deeply mourned as Prince Henry." Henry's titles of Duke of Cornwall and Duke of Rothesay passed to Charles, who until then had lived in Henry's shadow. Four years later, Charles, then 16 years old, was created Prince of Wales and Earl of Chester.

== Literature and music occasioned by the prince's death ==
=== Sermons ===
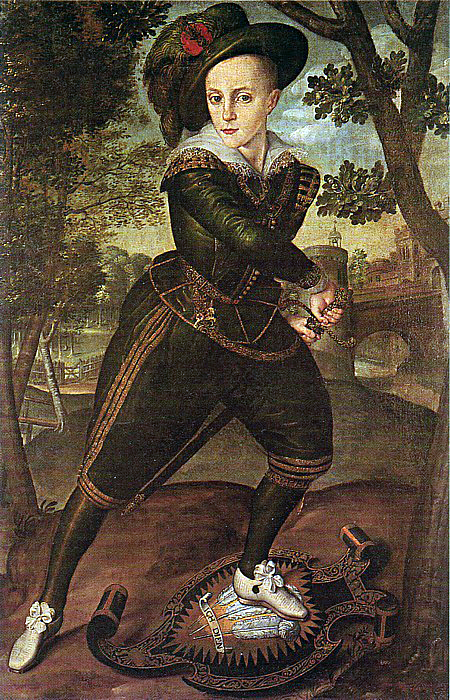
Portrait aged 13 or 14. He stands on a shield bearing his Prince of Wales's feathers.

Henry's chaplain, Daniel Price, delivered a series of sermons about the young man's death. (Price borrowed from John Donne's unrelated The First Anniversary, published in 1611, and The Second Anniversary, published in 1612, for some of his language and ideas.):

- Lamentations for the death of the late illustrious Prince Henry [...] Two Sermons (1613; see 1613 in literature): "Oh, why is there not a generall thaw throughout all mankinde? why in this debashed Ayre doe not all things expire, seeing Time looks upon us with watry eues, disheveld lockes, and heavie dismall lookes; now that the Sunne is gone out of our Firmament, the ioy, the beautie, the glory of Israel is departed?"
- Spirituall Odours to the Memory of Prince Henry. In Four of the Last Sermons Preached in St James after his Highnesse Death (Oxford, 1613; see 1613 in literature) From "Meditations of Consolation in our Lamentations": "[...] his body was so faire and strong that a soule might have been pleased to live an age in it [...] vertue and valor, beauty and chastity, armes and arts, met and kist in him, and his goodnesse lent so much mintage to other Princes, that if Xenophon were now to describe a Prince, Prince HENRY had been his Patterne. [...] He hath gon his Passover from death to life, where there is more grace and more capacity [...] where earthly bodies shalbe more celestiall, then man in his Innocency or Angels in their glory, for they could fall: Hee is there with those Patriarchs that have expected Christ on earth, longer than they have enjoyed him in heaven; He is with those holy Penmen of the holy spirit, they bee now his paterns, who were here his teachers [...]"
- Teares Shed over Abner. The Sermon Preached on the Sunday before the Prince his funerall in St James Chappell before the body (Oxford, (1613; see 1613 in literature): "He, He is dead, who while he lived, was a perpetuall Paradise, every season that he shewd himselfe in a perpetuall spring, eavery exercise wherein he was scene a special felicity: He, He is dead before us [...] He, He is dead; that blessed Model of heaven his face is covered till the latter day, whose shining lamps his eyes in whose light there was life to the beholders, they bee ecclipsed until the sunne give over shining. [...] He, He is dead, and now yee see this [...]"

=== Prose memorials ===
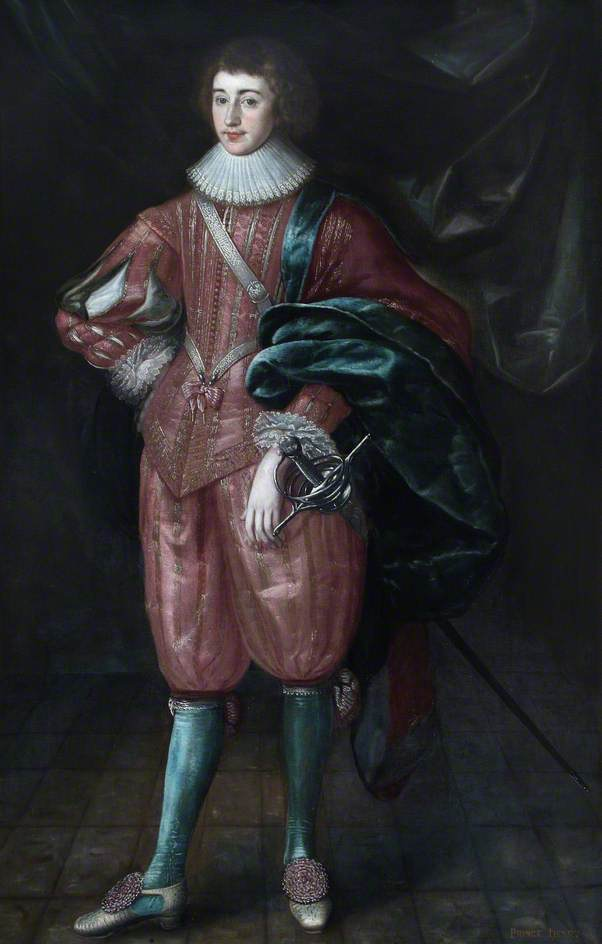
Posthumous portrait by George Geldorp

Price also wrote two prose "Anniversaries" on the death:

- Prince Henry His First Anniversary (Oxford, 1613; see 1613 in literature): "in HIM, a glimmering light of the Golden times appeare, all lines of expectation met in this Center, all spirits of vertue, scattered into others were extracted into him [...]"
- Another "Anniversary", published in 1614

=== Verses ===
Within a few months of the prince's death, at least 32 poets had versified on it. In addition to those listed below, the writers included Sir Walter Raleigh (a friend), John Donne, Edward Herbert, Thomas Heywood and Henry King.

These poems were published in 1612 (see 1612 in poetry):

- Sir William Alexander, An Elegie on the Death of Prince Henrie
- Joshua Sylvester, Lachrimae Lachrimarum; or, The Distillation of Teares Shede for the Untimely Death of the Incomparable Prince Panaretus, also includes poems in English, French, Latin and Italian by Walter Quin
- George Wither, Prince Henries Obsequies; or, Mournefull Elegies Upon his Death

These poems and songs were published in 1613 (see 1613 in poetry):

- Thomas Campion, Songs of Mourning: Bewailing the Untimely Death of Prince Henry, verse and music; music by Giovanni Coperario (or "Copario"), said to have been John Cooper, an Englishman
- George Chapman, An Epicede or Funerall Song, On the Most Disastrous Death, of the Highborne Prince of Men, Henry Prince of Wales, &c., the work states "1612" but was published in 1613
- John Davies, The Muses-Teares for the Losse of their Hope
- William Drummond of Hawthornden, Tears on the Death of Moeliades
- Mary Oxley, or Oxlie, a Scottish poet living in Morpeth, wrote a response to William Drummond of Hawthornden's Moeliades, which was published in 1656.

=== Music ===
Thomas Tomkins composed an anthem for the funeral, "Know ye not" which set words from the Old Testament selected by Arthur Lake. Both Thomas Tomkins and Thomas Weelkes composed settings of "When David heard", a passage from the Books of Samuel in which King David laments the loss of his son Absalom in battle; it has been suggested that these settings were directly inspired by the death of the prince, although the association has been regarded as speculative.

John Ward composed two elegies for six voices on the death of the Prince. Ward included Weep forth your tears, a "mourning song" for Prince Henry in his First Set of Madrigals (published in 1613). The other elegy, No object dearer, remained unpublished during the composer's lifetime.

== Honours and arms ==
Coat of arms of Henry Frederick, Prince of Wales

=== Honours ===
- KG: Knight of the Garter, 14 June 1603

=== Arms ===
Henry Frederick as Prince of Wales bore the arms of the kingdom, differenced by a label of three points argent.

== Ancestry ==
Ancestors of Henry Frederick, Prince of Wales

8. Matthew Stewart, 4th Earl of Lennox
4. Henry Stuart, Lord Darnley
9. Margaret Douglas
2. James VI of Scotland and I of England
10. James V of Scotland
5. Mary, Queen of Scots
11. Mary of Guise
1. Henry Frederick, Prince of Wales
12. Christian III of Denmark
6. Frederick II of Denmark
13. Dorothea of Saxe-Lauenburg
3. Anne of Denmark
14. Ulrich, Duke of Mecklenburg-Güstrow
7. Sophie of Mecklenburg
15. Elizabeth of Denmark

Henry Frederick, Prince of Wales House of Stuart Born: 19 February 1594 Died: 6 November 1612
British royalty
Vacant Title last held by Edward Tudor	Prince of Wales; 1610–1612	Succeeded by Charles Stuart
Vacant Title last held by Edward Tudor	Duke of Cornwall; 1603–1612	Succeeded by Charles Stuart
Preceded by James Stuart	Duke of Rothesay; 1594–1612	Succeeded by Charles Stuart
