= Catch a Falling Star (disambiguation) =

"Catch a Falling Star" is a 1957 song performed by Perry Como.

Catch a Falling Star may also refer to:

- "Catch a Falling Star" (Ben 10: Ultimate Alien), a 2012 television episode
- "Catch a Falling Star" (Quantum Leap), a 1989 television episode
- Jade: Catch a Falling Star, the second autobiography of Jade Goody
- Catch a Falling Star, a game on The Challenge: All Stars season 4

== See also ==
- Go and Catch a Falling Star
- Would You Catch a Falling Star
