= A Valediction: Forbidding Mourning =

Poem by John Donne

- by John Donne
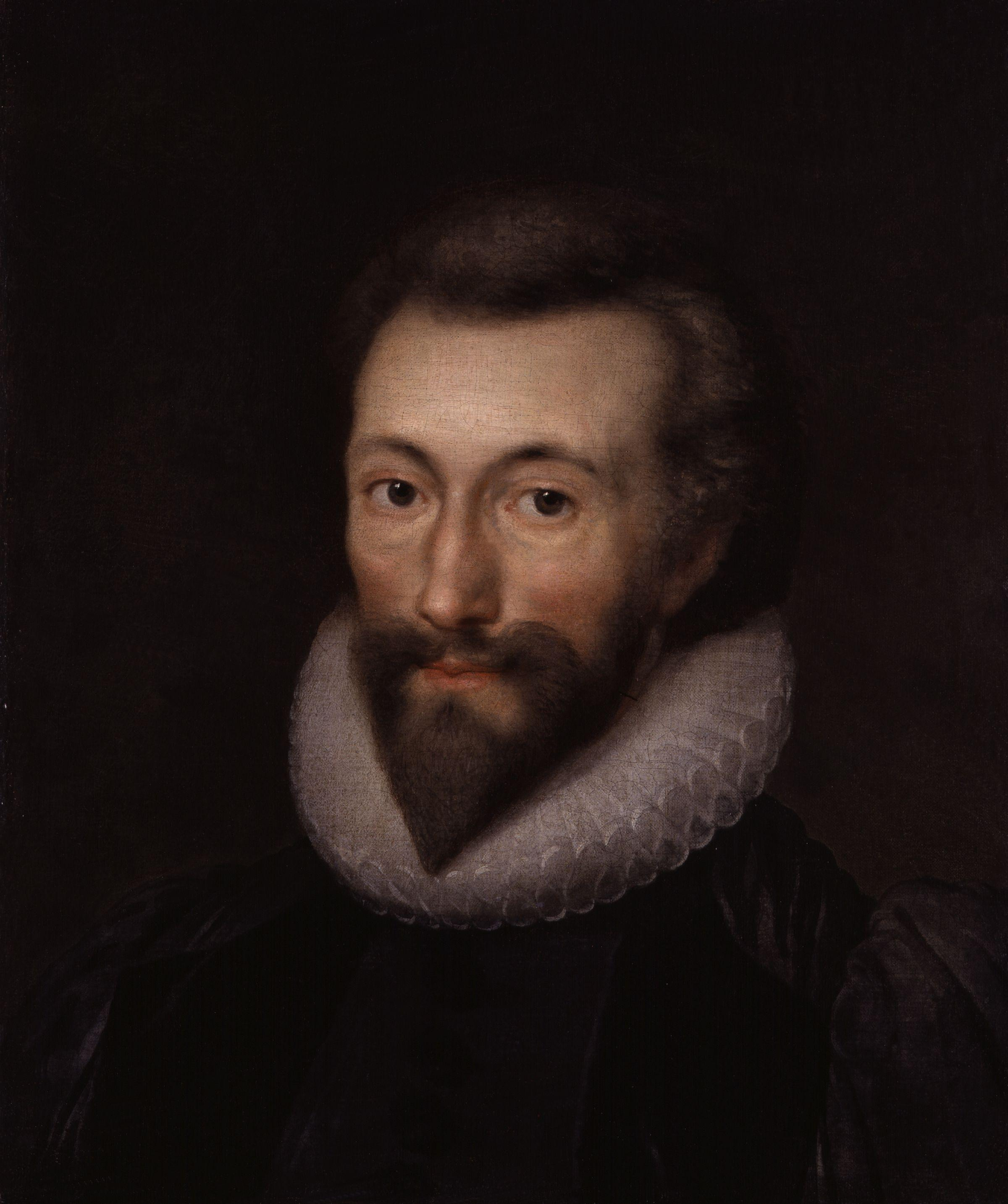
- John Donne, who wrote "A Valediction: Forbidding Mourning"
- Written: 1611 or 1612
- Country: Kingdom of England
- Language: English
- Publication date: 1633

"A Valediction: Forbidding Mourning" is a metaphysical poem by John Donne. Written in 1611 or 1612 for his wife Anne before he left on a trip to Continental Europe, "A Valediction" is a 36-line love poem that was first published in the 1633 collection Songs and Sonnets, two years after Donne's death. Based on the theme of two lovers about to part for an extended time, the poem is notable for its use of conceits and ingenious analogies to describe the couple's relationship; critics have thematically linked it to several of his other works, including "A Valediction: of my Name, in the Window", Meditation III from the Holy Sonnets and "A Valediction: of Weeping".

Donne's use of a drafting compass as an analogy for the couple—two points, inextricably linked—has been both praised as an example of his "virtuoso display of similitude", and also criticised as an illustration of the excesses of metaphysical poetry; despite detractors, it remains "the best known sustained conceit" in English poetry. As well as citing this most famous example, literary critics point to Donne's use of subtlety and precise wording in "A Valediction", particularly around the alchemical theme that pervades the text.

== Background ==
John Donne was born on 22 January 1572 to John Donne, a wealthy ironmonger and one of the wardens of the Worshipful Company of Ironmongers, and his wife, Elizabeth. Donne was four when his father died and, instead of being prepared to enter a trade, he was trained as a gentleman scholar; his family used the money his father had made from ironmongering to hire private tutors who taught him grammar, rhetoric, mathematics, history and foreign languages. Elizabeth soon remarried to a wealthy doctor, ensuring that the family remained comfortable; as a result, despite being the son of an ironmonger and portraying himself in his early poetry as an outsider, Donne refused to accept that he was anything other than a gentleman. After study at Hart Hall, Oxford, Donne's private education eventually saw him study at Lincoln's Inn, one of the Inns of Court, where he occupied his time with history, poetry, theology and "Humane learning and languages". It was at Lincoln's Inn that Donne first began writing poetry, looking upon it as "a life-sign or minor irritation" rather than something which defined him.

In November 1597, he became chief secretary to Thomas Egerton, and soon after met Egerton's niece, Anne More. After meeting in 1599, the two conducted a heated love affair in the summer of 1600; letters exchanged between the two reveal the growing suspicion of Anne's father, Sir George More, and Donne's pledge to pick Anne over the favour of his patron, Egerton. The two secretly married, and when More discovered this in 1602, he had Donne sent to Fleet Prison for violating canon law. After many demands, Egerton also consented to Donne's dismissal. After Donne wrote to Egerton, he was released from prison, and during his trial at the Court of Audience the marriage was validated and Donne absolved of any canon law violation. "A Valediction" was written to a heavily pregnant Anne, in 1611 or 1612, as Donne prepared to travel to Continental Europe with Sir Robert Drury. It was later published in 1633 as part of the collection Songs and Sonnets, following his death.

== Poem ==
36 lines long, the poem opens with:

Original Text

As virtuous men passe mildly away,
And whisper to their soules, to goe,
Whilst some of their sad friends doe say,
The breath goes now, and some say, no:

So let us melt, and make no noise,
No teare-floods, nor sigh-tempests move,
T'were prophanation of our joyes
To tell the layetie our love.

— Stanzas 1-2 (lines 1-8)

Modern Adaption

As virtuous men pass mildly away,
And whisper to their souls to go,
Whilst some of their sad friends do say
The breath goes now, and some say, No:

So let us melt, and make no noise,
No tear-floods, nor sigh-tempests move;
'Twere profanation of our joys
To tell the laity our love.

— Stanzas 1-2 (lines 1-8)

In these stanzas, Donne compares the parting of two lovers to a death, desiring the lovers' parting to be quiet, without struggle, and voluntary even though it is inevitable. At the same time, he considers the separation of lovers to be equivalent to the soul separating from the body on death. Ramie Targoff argues that this is not because he sees the separation of the lovers as permanent, like death, but that as with death Donne finds the challenge with separation to be ensuring the relationship's continuity in the future.

Moving of th'earth brings harmes and fears,
Men reckon what it did and meant,
But trepidation of the spheares,
Though greater farre, is innocent.

— Stanza 3 (lines 9-12)

Moving of th' earth brings harms and fears,
Men reckon what it did, and meant;
But trepidation of the spheres,
Though greater far, is innocent.

— Stanza 3 (lines 9-12)

Writing in Texas Studies in Literature and Language, Peter L. Rudnytsky notes the "imagery of extraordinary complexity" in this stanza. "Moving of th' earth" is interpreted not to refer to earthquakes, but to the then-recent theories about the movement of Earth. This theory is supported by the use of the phrase "trepidation of the spheres", an obsolete astronomical theory used in the Ptolemaic system.

Dull sublunary lovers love
(Whose soul is sense) cannot admit
Absence, because it doth remove
Those things which elemented it.

But we by a love, so much refin'd,
That our selves know not what it is,
Inter-assured of the mind,
Care lesse, eyes, lips and hands to misse.

— Stanzas 4-5 (lines 13-20)

Dull sublunary lovers' love
(Whose soul is sense) cannot admit
Absence, because it doth remove
Those things which elemented it.

But we by a love so much refined,
That our selves know not what it is,
Inter-assured of the mind,
Care less, eyes, lips, and hands to miss.

— Stanzas 4-5 (lines 13-20)

Theresa M. DiPasquale notes the use of "refined" as a continuation of an alchemical theme set in the earlier stanzas, with the phrase "so much refined" ambiguous as to whether it is modifying "love", or the couple themselves are being refined by the love they share.

Our two soules therefore, which are one,
Though I must goe, endure not yet
A breach, but an expansion,
Like gold to ayery thinnesse beate.

— Stanza 6 (lines 21-24)

Our two souls therefore, which are one,
Though I must go, endure not yet
A breach, but an expansion,
Like gold to airy thinness beat.

— Stanza 6 (lines 21-24)

These lines use a piece of gold to describe the love between the writer and the subject of the poem. While beating the gold ever-thinner spreads it out, widening the distance between the couple, the gold now covers more room—it has spread and become pervasive. Beating it to "aery thinness"—distributing it throughout the air—means that the love is now part of the atmosphere itself.

If they be two, they are two so
As stiffe twin compasses are two,
Thy soule the fixt foot, makes no show
To move, but doth, if th'other doe.

And though it in the centre sit,
Yet, when the other far doth rome,
It leanes, and hearkens after it,
And grows erect, as that comes home.

Such wilt thou be to mee, who must
Like th'other foot, obliquely runne;
Thy firmnes makes my circle just,
And makes me end, where I begunne.

— Stanzas 7-9 (lines 25-36)

If they be two, they are two so
As stiff twin compasses are two;
Thy soul, the fixed foot, makes no show
To move, but doth, if the other do.

And though it in the centre sit,
Yet, when the other far doth roam,
It leans and hearkens after it,
And grows erect, as that comes home.

Such wilt thou be to me, who must,
Like th' other foot, obliquely run;
Thy firmness makes my circle just,
And makes me end where I begun.

— Stanzas 7-9 (lines 25-36)

The analogy here—of a pair of compasses in the process of drawing a circle—draws contrasts between the two lovers, where one is fixed and "in the centre sit[s]" while the other roams; despite this, the two remain inextricably connected and interdependent, staying inseparable despite the increasing distance between the two compass hands. Achsah Guibbory identifies a pun in "the fix'd foot... Thy firmness makes my circle just"; a circle with a dot in the middle is the alchemical symbol for gold, an element referred to in a previous stanza.

== Themes ==
Thematically, "A Valediction" is a love poem; Meg Lota Brown, a professor at the University of Arizona, notes that the entire poem (but particularly the compass analogy in the final three stanzas) "ascribe to love the capacity to admit changing circumstances without itself changing at the same time". Achsah Guibbory highlights "A Valediction" as an example of both the fear of death that "haunts" Donne's love poetry and his celebration of sex as something sacred; the opening draws an analogy between the lovers' parting and death, while, later on, the poem frames sex in religious overtones, noting that if the lovers were "to tell the layetie [of] our love" they would profane it.

Targoff argues that "A Valediction" follows on from Donne's earlier poem "A Valediction: of my Name, in the Window" in theme, with the opening stanza of one, like the closing stanza of the other, concerning itself with dying men, while J.D. Jahn, writing in the journal College Literature, compares it to Donne's Meditation III, from the Holy Sonnets. Carol Marks Sicherman, however, draws parallels between it and another Valediction—"A Valediction: of Weeping", saying that "The speaker of "Mourning" begins where his "Weeping" colleague ends; he knows at the outset that "teare-floods" and "sigh-tempests" do not suit the climate of love he and his lady enjoy".

== Critical response ==
Considering it Donne's most famous valedictory poem, Theodore Redpath praises "A Valediction" for its "lofty and compelling restraint, and the even tenor of its movement". Targoff maintains that what distinguishes "A Valediction: Forbidding Mourning" from Donne's other "Valedictions" is what Donne leaves for his lover: "Donne does not leave his beloved either a physical or spiritual piece of himself. Instead, he leaves her the power of his poetic making. What is meant to prevent her "mourning" is not her possession of his name or book or heart or soul. It is the possession of his metaphors, metaphors of their union that seem invulnerable to division". Guibbory uses "A Valediction" to highlight Donne's status as "master of the monosyllable, the small word that holds the line taut" with his use of the word "beat" rather than "spun" in the analogy of beaten gold, while Ian Ousby uses the compass metaphor as an example of Donne's skill at weaving conceits "sometimes extended throughout an entire poem in a virtuoso display of similitude". This view is seconded by Geoffrey Galt Harpham, who refers to it as "the best known sustained conceit".

Sicherman writes that "A Valediction" is an example of Donne's writing style, providing "[a] confident opening, a middle in which initial certainties give way gradually to new perceptions, and a conclusion manifesting a clear and profoundly rooted assurance". At the same time, she considers it "a poem whose development is so subtle, whose conclusion so perfect, that one may remain unaware of while responsive to the pattern of discovery". The analogy of beaten gold was heavily criticised by T. S. Eliot as not being based on a statement of philosophical theory; Targoff argues that this is incorrect — that Donne had a consistent philosophy, and that the analogy of beaten gold can be traced to the writings of Tertullian, one of Donne's greatest religious influences. Another critic of Donne, Samuel Johnson, noted that the poem's compass analogy highlights the "violence" used by metaphysical poets to "[force] the most heterogeneous ideas together".

== Bibliography ==
- Brown, Meg Lota (1995). Donne and the politics of conscience in early modern England. BRILL. ISBN 90-04-10157-8.
- Carey, John (2008). John Donne: Life, Mind and Art. Faber and Faber. ISBN 978-0-571-24446-1.
- Colclough, David (2003). John Donne's professional lives. DS Brewer. ISBN 0-85991-775-4.
- DiPasquale, Theresa M. (2001). Literature & Sacrament: The Sacred and the Secular in John Donne. James Clarke & Co. ISBN 0-227-67967-9.
- Donne, John (1912). Grierson, Herbert J. C. (ed.). The Poems of John Donne. Vol. 1. London: Oxford University Press.
- Guibbory, Achsah (2006). "Erotic Poetry". In Achsah Guibbory (ed.). The Cambridge Companion to John Donne. Cambridge University Press. ISBN 978-0-521-54003-2.
- Harpham, Geoffrey Galt (2009). Glossary of Literary Terms. Cengage Learning. ISBN 978-1-4130-3390-8.
- Jahn, J.D. (1978). "The Eschatological Scene of Donne's "A Valediction: Forbidding Mourning"". College Literature. 5 (1). West Chester University. ISSN 0093-3139.
- Ousby, Ian (1993). The Cambridge guide to literature in English. Cambridge University Press. ISBN 0-521-44086-6.
- Redpath, Theodore (1967). The Songs and Sonnets of John Donne (3rd ed.). Taylor & Francis. ISBN 978-0-416-69660-8.
- Rudnytsky, Peter L. (1982). ""The Sight of God": Donne's Poetics of Transcendence". Texas Studies in Literature and Language. 24 (2). University of Texas Press.
- Sicherman, Carol Marks (1971). "Donne's Discoveries". SEL: Studies in English Literature 1500–1900. 11 (1). Rice University: 69–88. doi:10.2307/449819. ISSN 0039-3657. JSTOR 449819.
- Stubbs, John (2007). Donne: The Reformed Soul. Penguin Books. ISBN 978-0-14-101717-4.
- Targoff, Ramie (2008). John Donne, Body and Soul. University of Chicago Press. ISBN 978-0-226-78978-1.
- Tiempo, Edith L. (1993). Introduction to Poetry. Rex Bookstore, Inc. ISBN 971-23-1205-4.
