= George Donne =

George Donne (1605–1639) was an English soldier and colonial official who served as muster-master general and a member of Governor John Harvey's council in the Colony of Virginia for a few months in 1637. Donne fought for the English in the siege on the Île de Ré in 1627, and in the defence of Saint Kitts in 1629.

== Early life ==
George Donne was born in 1605 to clergyman John Donne. Many of John's friends were investors in the Virginia Company and he was made an honorary member in 1622.

== Military career ==
In 1627, Donne was a captain and sergeant-major that participated in the failed English siege on the Île de Ré.

Donne served as a military commander for England's colony on Saint Kitts, but Fadrique de Toledo, 1st Marquess of Valdueza captured the island in 1629. Donne negotiated a surrender that allowed the colonist to sail home using captured ships while Donne was held hostage until the return of those ships. However, the English did not return the ships and Donne remained imprisoned in Cádiz until escaping in 1633.

== Virginia ==
Charles I of England made Donne a member of Harvey's council and a muster-master general. Donne came to the Colony of Virginia with John Harvey in 1637.

Harvey was removed as governor in 1635 due to allegations from his council of gross misconduct, but Charles I restored him as governor. Harvey had opponents in both Virginia and England that required him to defend himself before the royal court. Donne returned to England after a few months in Virginia to present his report Virginia Reviewed to the king. In his report he criticised how public officials, including those appointed by the king, were challenged by the colonists. His 60-page work was unable to prevent Harvey from being removed as governor. Donne died in 1639 while returning to Virginia.

The historian R.C. Bald questioned if John Donne's son and the Donne sent to Virginia were the same person. One document lists Donne being appointed to Virginia in 1631, while he was known to be in a Spanish prison. However, T. H. Breen disputed this as Donne's arrival in Virginia did not occur until 1637, and wrote that the 1631 document was misdated.

== Works cited ==
=== Books ===
- Tarter, Brent (2013). The Grandees of Government: The Origins and Persistence of Undemocratic Politics in Virginia. University of Virginia Press. ISBN 9780813934327.

=== Journals ===
- Breen, T. (1973). "George Donne's "Virginia Reviewed": A 1638 Plan to Reform Colonial Society". William and Mary Quarterly. 30 (3). Omohundro Institute of Early American History and Culture: 449–466. doi:10.2307/1918484. JSTOR 1918484.
- Evans, Kasey (2012). "Temperate Revenge: Religion, Profit, and Retaliation in 1622 Jamestown". Texas Studies in Literature and Language. 54 (1). University of Texas Press: 155–188. doi:10.2307/41349153. JSTOR 41349153.
