= Ignatius His Conclave =

1611 book by John Donne

Ignatius His Conclave is a prose work by 16/17th century metaphysical poet John Donne, published in both Latin and English editions in 1611. The title is an example of "his genitive" and means the conclave of Ignatius. The work satirizes the Jesuits. In the story, St. Ignatius of Loyola, the founder of the Jesuits, is found to be in Hell:

But Ignatius Layola which was got neere his chaire, a subtile fellow, and so indued with the Divell, that he was able to tempt, and not onely that, but (as they say) even to possesse the Divell, apprehended this perplexity in Lucifer.

Ignatius is subsequently ejected from Hell and ordered to colonize the moon where he will do less harm.

The text mocks Jesuit evangelism and makes references to many scientists of the day, including Copernicus, Kepler, Brahe, and Galileo. Marjorie Hope Nicolson sees Ignatius as derived from Johannes Kepler's Somnium
