= Essays in Divinity =

Prose work by John Donne

Essays in Divinity is a prose work by the poet and preacher John Donne. Likely written in 1614 before Donne took holy orders, this text consists of two extended explications and meditations on the first verses in the Biblical books of Genesis and Exodus, followed by prayers. The range of topics discussed in Donne's essays shows his extensive reading in the Church Fathers, as well as his knowledge of more obscure subjects like Cabbalism and the book of creatures.

In terms of genre, the Essays share features of Donne's other prose works. Donne calls his essays "Sermons," claiming that "Scriptor manu prædicat [a writer preaches by hand]." Michael Hall has argued that the Essays also resemble the Essaies of Michel de Montaigne, in that Donne uses "rhetorical techniques which are subtly subversive, which purposely confound the reader and lead to active and cooperative inquiry."

Donne was a layman when he wrote the Essays, and the text repeatedly wrestles with the "question of credibility." Donne defends his lay status by comparing divinity to a building where different sorts of people are granted different levels of access: "To reverend Divines... the great Doors are open. Let me with Lazarus lie at the threshold, and beg their crum[b]s." Although he claims to be humble, Donne explains that humility should not prevent even laymen from dedicating their time to religious topics, as long as they do not probe too far: "it is not such a groveling, frozen, and stupid Humility, as should quench the activity of our understanding, or make us neglect the Search of those Secrets of God, which are accessible."

Donne never published the Essays, which were not available to readers until 1651, when they were published by Donne's son. Donne Jr. initially dedicated the work to Sir Henry Vane the Younger, a prominent Parliamentarian whom he calls a "GREAT EXAMPLE OF HONOUR AND DEVOTION."
