= Biathanatos =

Work by John Donne

Biathanatos (from Greek Βιαθανατος meaning "violent death") is a prose work by the English writer and clergyman John Donne. Written in 1608 and published after his death, it contains a heterodox defense of "self-homicide" (suicide), listing prominent Biblical examples including Jesus, Samson, Saul, and Judas Iscariot. Thomas De Quincey responds to the work in his "On Suicide", and Jorge Luis Borges responds in "Biathanatos".

== Background ==
During their sixteen years of marriage Donne's wife Anne More gave birth to 12 children, out of which three died before the age of ten. Donne wrote Biathanatos in a state of despair that almost drove him to kill himself. He noted that the death of a child would mean one mouth fewer to feed, but he could not afford the burial expenses. During this time, Donne wrote but did not publish Biathanatos, his defence of suicide.

== Contents ==
Donne begins by addressing his patron, Phillip Harbert, then divides the book, after a preface, into three parts, each part divided into distinctions, each distinction divided into sections. The first part focuses on "The Law of Nature", the second on "The Law of Reason", and the third on "The Law of God", before ending with a conclusion.

== Modern Edition ==
- Donne, John (1982), Rudick, Michael; Battin, M. Pabst (eds.), Biathanatos, Garland English Texts, ISBN 9781166173944.
