= Death's Duel =

Final sermon delivered by John Donne

Death's Duel is the final sermon delivered by John Donne as the Dean of St. Paul's Cathedral. Donne preached the sermon on 25 February 1631, the first Friday in Lent. The sermon was likely written out in full prior to Donne preaching it, as it was subsequently prepared for publication. The act of preaching exhausted Donne. To those he had preached, it seemed as though he had delivered his own death sermon. The sermon was entered in the Stationers' Register on 30 September 1631, although not with its title, which first appeared in print along with a 1632 date. Donne died on 31 March 1631.

== Content ==
In Death's Duel, Donne returns to the themes found in many of his works, particularly that of death and resurrection. He confronts the physical reality of death before moving to the idea of the final resurrection. He ultimately discusses the life of Jesus Christ and that if he could confront the horrors of dying for mankind, then so can we.
