= Pseudo-Martyr =

1610 polemical prose tract by John Donne

Pseudo-Martyr is a 1610 polemical prose tract in English by John Donne. It contributed to the religious pamphlet war of the time, and was Donne's first appearance in print. It argued that English Roman Catholics should take the Oath of Allegiance of James I of England. It was printed by William Stansby for Walter Burre.

== Background ==
Donne had converted from Catholicism, but had not moved decisively into the Protestant camp. From 1604 he became involved in controversial theology as an onlooker, assisting his friend Thomas Morton in a reply to James Anderton, commissioned by Richard Bancroft.

== The content of Pseudo-Martyr ==
Donne entered directly into one of the major debates of the period, supporting Sir Edward Coke against the Jesuit Robert Parsons. Coke in Fift Part of the Reports (1606) had made a historical argument on the powers of the King of England in church matters. Donne characterised the English mission, of Catholic priests trained to convert Protestants and sustain English Catholics, as "enemies to the dignity of all princes", and seditious because of the theories of temporal power of the Pope supported particularly by the Jesuits. Donne used a comparison with the Circumcellions to denigrate Jesuit attitudes to martyrdom.

A more subtle side to the argument is that it recognised that the oath had closed down the option of passive obedience to the king. Donne threw the onus of swearing onto individual conscience, discounting both arguments from the state and the authority of casuistry. The only acceptable basis was scripture and knowledge of nature, the duty of obedience being considered in the light of natural law.

== Intention and reception ==
Pseudo-Martyr launched Donne into a career as a clergyman of the Church of England, one of the reasons he wrote it. He also aimed it at English Catholics. The work influenced Thomas James, who praised it.
