= Anniversaries (John Donne Poems) =

Elegies by John Donne

The Anniversaries are two long poems by John Donne written in 1611 and 1612. The poems are elegies written for Elizabeth Drury, the 14-year-old daughter of Donne's wealthy patron Sir Robert Drury, whose death was reported on 13 December 1610.

The first of the two poems, commonly referred to as The First Anniversary: An Anatomy of the World, was published in 1611 and the second, known as The Second Anniversary: Of the Progress of the Soul, was published in spring 1612. Occasionally, the Anniversaries are described in the academic literature as a trio of poems due to Donne's poem A Funeral Elegy being included in the original print of An Anatomy of the World. An Anatomy of the World was Donne's first poem to be published in print, although many of his poems had been circulated in manuscripts before this.

== The First Anniversary: An Anatomy of the World ==
An Anatomy of the World, or An Anatomie of the World, Wherein By Occasion of the untimely death of Mistris Elizabeth Drury, the frailtie and the decay of this whole world is represented, was written and published along with A Funeral Elegy in 1611.

After hearing of Elizabeth Drury's death, Donne wrote A Funerall Elegie and presented it to the Drurys. They asked him to write a Latin epitaph for their daughter's monument and also to accompany them to France. In November 1611, before the trip to France, Donne wrote and had printed An Anatomy of the World.

The poem is not only a personal elegy dwelling upon the loss of the Drury's daughter, but also a metaphysical conceit using Elizabeth's death as a metaphor to discuss the demise of the world and all of its virtues. Donne reflects upon the religious and sociocultural upheaval and fracturing present within early 17th-century England, bemoaning that the state of society, "'Tis all in pieces, all coherence gone."

Donne uses the concept of anatomy to undertake a dissection of the world, examining the causes of the world's death in the form of a loss of social unity and spiritual sickness. Donne may have been informed by contemporary medical and philosophical ideas like those on anatomy by Andreas Vesalius, whose medical work Donne had studied, and Paracelsus, who considered the human body to be a microcosm of the entire world.

== The Second Anniversary: Of the Progress of the Soul ==
Of the Progress of the Soul, or Of the Progresse of the Soule, Wherein: By Occasion of the Religious Death of Mistris Elizabeth Drury, the incommodities of the Soule in this life and her exaltation in the next, are contemplated, was written whilst Donne was accompanying the Drurys on their trip to France.

In spring 1612 the poem was published as a volume together with An Anatomy of the World and it is at this point where the poems received their secondary title of The First Anniversary and The Second Anniversary, becoming collectively known as the Anniversaries.

== Criticism of the poems ==
In 1619, William Drummond of Hawthornden reported that fellow poet Ben Jonson stated to him when they had spoken in 1618 that "Dones [sic] Anniversarie was profane and full of Blasphemies: that he told Mr Donne, if it had been written of the Virgin Marie it had been something..." Donne apparently replied, "that he described the Idea of a Woman, and not as she was.
