= Mary Oxlie =

Scottish or Northumbrian poet

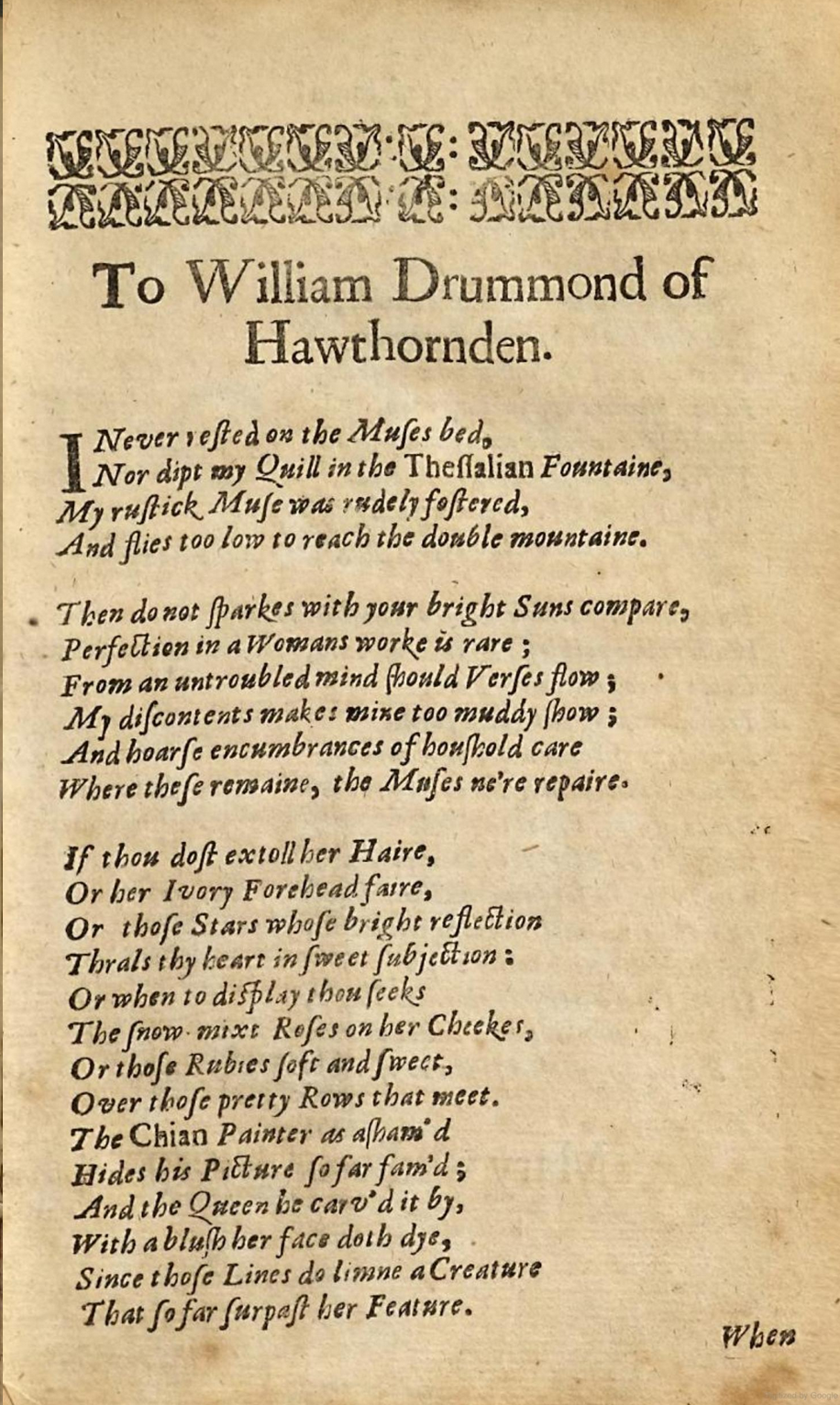
First half of Mary Oxlie's "To William Drummond of Hawthornden". Poems, by that most famous wit, William Drummond of Hawthornden, Ed. Edward Phillips, 1656, p. xix.

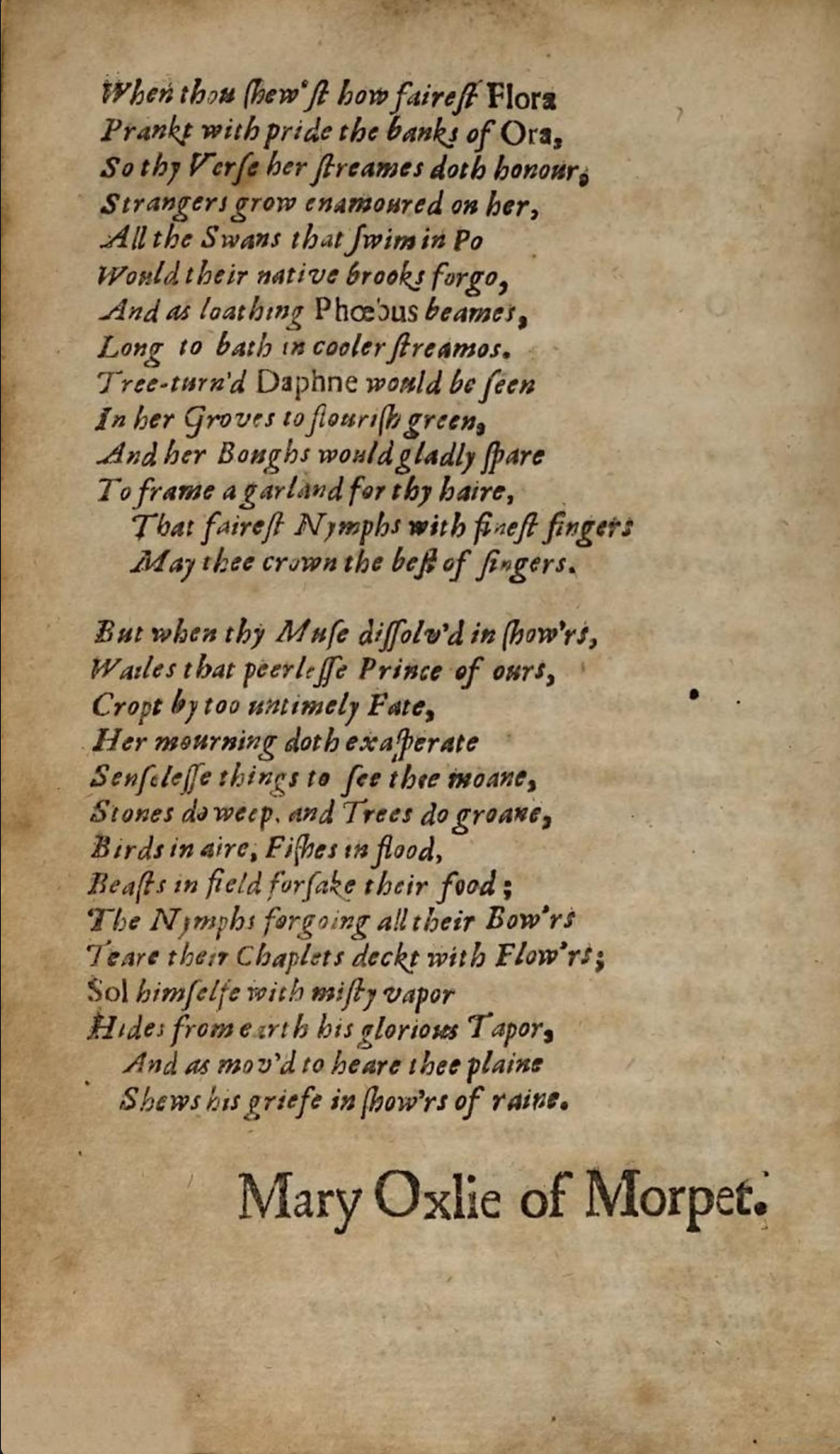
Second half of "To William Drummond of Hawthornden", p. xx.

Mary Oxlie or Oxley (fl. 1616) was a 17th-century Scottish or Northumbrian poet, known for one surviving published composition, a "literary eulogy or friendship poem".

== Life and work ==
Mary Oxlie of Morpeth is credited as the author of a commendatory poem of fifty-two lines, "To William Drummond of Hawthornden," which prefaced Edward Phillips' 1656 edition of Drummond's poems. Phillips was Drummond's brother-in-law.

In 1675, in a section of his Theatrum poetarum called "Women among the moderns eminent for poetry," Phillips describes "Mary Morpeth" as a "Scotch Poetess" who wrote "many other things in Poetry" (p. 259) apart from the dedication, though none of these other poems are now known. The 1656 ascription identifies her as Northumbrian. The original date of the poem is conjectural, though from internal evidence it would seem to have been 1616.

She, along with other women such as Anna Hume, may have been part of the Hawthornden literary circle or coterie: Phillips terms her "a friend of the Poet Drummond" (p. 259).

She may have also been the author of two occasional poems published as broadsides and signed "M.M.", though the source texts have been lost.

== "To William Drummond of Hawthornden" ==
Oxlie's dedicatory poem opens with formulaic humility:

I Never rested on the Muses bed,
Nor dipt my Quill in the Thessalian Fountaine,
My rustick Muse was rudely fostered,
And flies too low to reach the double mountaine. (1-4)

The second verse clarifies that this "rusticity" is due in large part to the particular situation of the woman writer:

Perfection in a Woman's worke is rare
From an untroubled mind should Verses flow;
My discontents makes mine too muddy show;
And hoarse encumbrances of household care
Where these remaine, the muses ne're repaire. (6-10)

Despite these caveats, the poem itself is generally agreed to be an accomplished pastoral that offers insight into the coterie culture of the period. The poem praises Drummond's skill as writer of flattering verse addressed to women but reserves greater adulation for his evocation of sorrow at the death of the "peerless prince" Henry Frederick, Prince of Wales. Drummond, she wrote, might extinguish the sun's glorious taper and bring showers of rain.

But when thy Muse dissolv'd in show'rs,
Wailes that peerlesse Prince of ours,
Cropt by too untimely Fate,
Her mourning doth exasperate
Senselesse things to see thee moane,
Stones do weep, and Trees do groane,
Birds in aire, Fishes in flood,
Beasts in field forsake their food;
The Nymphs forgoing all their Bowers
Teare their Chaplets deckt with Flowers;
Sol himselfe with misty vapour
Hides from earth his glorious Taper,

And as mov'd to heare thee plaine
Shews his griefe in show'rs of raine. (39-52)

Oxlie's poem was anthologized in 1921 by J. C. Squire in A Book of Women’s Verse and more recently by Germaine Greer in 101 Poems by 101 Women (2001) and Jane Davidson and Peter Stevenson in Early Modern Women Poets (2001).

== Etexts ==
- Oxlie, Mary, of Morpet. "To William Drummond of Hawthornden". Poems, by that most famous wit, William Drummond of Hawthornden. London, 1656, pp. xix-xx. (Google Books)
- Oxlie, Mary. "To William Drummond of Hawthornden".The Poems of William Drummond of Hawthornden. Edinburgh, 1832, pp. xiii-iv. (Internet Archive)
