= A Hymn to God the Father =

Poem by John Donne

"A Hymn to God the Father", also titled "To Christ", is a poem by English poet and clergyman John Donne. It is one of his Divine Poems. Its date of composition is unknown.

== Overview ==
The poem was set to music by Pelham Humfrey in the 17th century and posthumously published in Harmonia Sacra, Book 1 (1688). A typical performance takes about 3 minutes. His setting has been included in 10 hymnals, under such other titles as its opening line, "Wilt Thou Forgive That Sin, Where I Begun", but without always crediting him as composer, or Donne as the author of the words. Another slightly earlier setting of the poem of about the same time was that by John Hilton. In the 20th century there were several more settings, both for chorus and individual performer.

The poem starts with Donne asking God whether He will forgive the sins committed even before his birth, referring to the doctrine of original sin. That pardoned, he adds that God's task is not complete for there is more to be forgiven. He amplifies in the second stanza that in addition there are the sins, witnessing which, others were tempted to sin themselves; his sins of backsliding are also included. In the final stanza Donne accuses himself of the sin of fear that he will still be lost, unless God confirms His promise that His son will shine upon him at his death. In the repeated line "When thou hast done, thou hast not done", the poet puns upon his own surname. But in the third line, "thou hast don(n)e", he pledges his faith in the Divine Redeemer.

== Discography ==
- 1951 – Alfred Deller (countertenor) and Geraint Jones (organ); arranged by Michael Tippett and Walter Bergmann, His Master's Voice C.4144
- 1966 – John Shirley-Quirk (bass-baritone) and Martin Isepp (piano)
- 1995 – Paul Agnew (tenor) and Christopher Wilson (lutes)
- 1995 – Ian Bostridge (tenor) and Graham Johnson (piano); in the realisation by Benjamin Britten
