= Achsah Guibbory =

American academic

Achsah Guibbory is an American academic currently serving as Professor of English at Barnard College. Her primary areas of focus are seventeenth century literature, religious history, and the works of both John Donne and John Milton; she has served as president of both the John Donne Society and the Milton Society of America.

== Career ==
After studying at Indiana University, which awarded her a BA in 1966, Guibbory gained both an MA and a PhD from the University of California, Los Angeles, completing her studies in 1970. She then moved to the University of Illinois at Urbana–Champaign as an assistant professor, and became a full professor in 1989. During her time at the University of Illinois she was awarded the Harriet and Charles Luckman Undergraduate Distinguished Teaching Award, served as an editor of The Journal of English and Germanic Philology, and was made a Fellow of the Huntington Library. Her publications at Illinois included The Map of Time: Seventeenth-Century English Literature and Ideas of Pattern in History in 1986 and Ceremony and Community from Herbert to Milton: Literature, Religion and Cultural Conflict in Seventeenth-Century English Literature in 1998. She was awarded a National Endowment for the Humanities Senior Research Fellowship for 2001. In 2004, having spent a semester there in 2003 as a visiting professor, Guibbory moved to Barnard College to take up a position as Professor of English. During her time at Barnard she has published The Cambridge Companion to John Donne in 2006, then was awarded a Guggenheim Fellowship in 2008. Her book Christian Identity, Jews and Israel was published by Oxford in 2010 and received an award from the Milton Society of America. In 2010 she also was awarded an honorary Doctor of Humane Letters from Iona College. The Milton Society of America named her Honored Milton Scholar for 2018.
