= Texas Studies in Literature and Language =

- Discipline: Literature
- Language: English
- Edited by: Allen MacDuffie and Hannah Wojciehowski

Publication details
- History: 1911-present
- Publisher: University of Texas Press (United States)
- Frequency: Quarterly

Standard abbreviations
- ISO 4: Tex. Stud. Lit. Lang.

Indexing
- ISSN: 0040-4691 (print); 1534-7303 (web)
- JSTOR: 00404691
- OCLC no.: 45882258

Links
- Journal homepage; Online access; Online access

Texas Studies in Literature and Language, commonly known as TSLL, is a peer-reviewed academic journal devoted to the humanities. It publishes essays reflecting a variety of critical approaches and all periods of literary history, with selected issues centering on special topics. Founded in 1911 as Studies in English, it was subsequently issued as The University of Texas Studies in English (1949-1956) and Texas Studies in English (1957-1958) before assuming its current name. It remains "one of the oldest, if not the oldest, scholarly journals of its kind in North America."

The journal is published quarterly by the University of Texas Press in Austin, Texas. It is indexed in Academic Search Complete, MLA International Bibliography, Russian Academy of Sciences Bibliographies, Book Review Index, ArticleFirst, Periodicals Index Online, ProQuest Research Library, Arts and Humanities Citation Index, and Web of Science.

Notable scholars who have published in TSLL include Gordon Braden, Rita Copeland, Louis Montrose, and Gayatri Chakravorty Spivak. In addition, in 1962 the journal published an essay by a 24-year-old Joyce Carol Oates (writing as "J.C. Oates") titled "Melville and the Manichean Illusion."

The journal has sponsored a number of special issues and noteworthy essays. A 2017 special issue on Modernism and Native America, edited by James H. Cox, included the previously unpublished Vine Theatre Manifesto by Cherokee dramatist Lynn Riggs as well as articles on N. Scott Momaday, Todd Downing, Ernest Hemingway and Katherine Anne Porter. In 2018, film scholar Donna Kornhaber curated a special issue devoted to the films of Austin director Wes Anderson. A 2019 special issue, co-edited by Janine Barchas and Devoney Looser, focused on future directions in Jane Austen studies. Research by John Rumrich into John Milton's blindness was also published in 2019, with the findings and topic discussed by Frank Bruni in The New York Times. In 2021, Domino Perez and Charles Ramirez Berg edited a special issue on the films of Austin director Robert Rodriguez, whom they dubbed "the Wizard of Awe".
