= Extended metaphor =

Use of a single metaphor or analogy at length

An extended metaphor, also known as a conceit or sustained metaphor, is the use of a single metaphor or analogy at length in a work of literature. It differs from a mere metaphor in its length, and in having more than one single point of contact between the object described (the so-called tenor) and the comparison used to describe it (the vehicle). These implications are repeatedly emphasized, discovered, rediscovered, and progressed in new ways.

== History of meaning ==
In the Renaissance, the term conceit (which is related to the word concept) indicated the idea that informed a literary work—its theme. Later, it came to stand for the extended and heightened metaphor common in Renaissance poetry, and later still it came to denote the even more elaborate metaphors of 17th century poetry.

The Renaissance conceit, given its importance in Petrarch's Il Canzoniere, is also referred to as Petrarchan conceit. It is a comparison in which human experiences are described in terms of an outsized metaphor (a kind of metaphorical hyperbole)—as in Petrarch's comparison between the effect of the gaze of the beloved and the sun melting snow. The history of poetry often features contemporary poets referencing the verses of their predecessors, like Shakespeare building on Petrarchan imagery in his Sonnet 130: "My mistress' eyes are nothing like the sun".

The 17th-century and the sometimes so-called metaphysical poets extended the notion of the elaborate metaphor; their idea of conceit differs from an extended analogy in the sense that it does not have a clear-cut relationship between the things being compared. Helen Gardner, in her study of the metaphysical poets, observed that "a conceit is a comparison whose ingenuity is more striking than its justness" and that "a comparison becomes a conceit when we are made to concede likeness while being strongly conscious of unlikeness."

== Petrarchan ==
The Petrarchan conceit is a form of love poetry wherein a man's love interest is referred to in hyperbole. For instance, the lover is a ship on a stormy sea, and his mistress is either "a cloud of dark disdain" or the sun.

The paradoxical pain and pleasure of lovesickness is often described using oxymoron, for instance uniting peace and war, burning and freezing, and so forth. But images which were novel in the sonnets of Petrarch, in his innovative exploration of human feelings, became clichés in the poetry of later imitators. Romeo uses hackneyed Petrarchan conceits when describing his love for Rosaline as "bright smoke, cold fire, sick health".

=== William Shakespeare ===
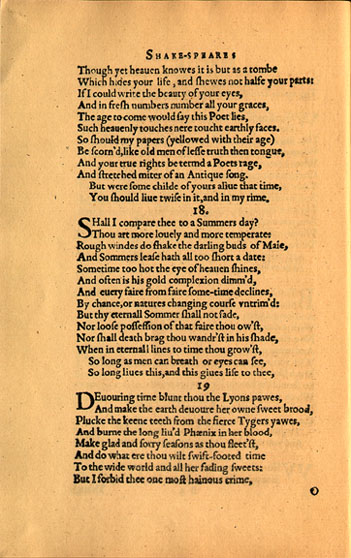
Original printing of Sonnet 18

In Sonnet 18 the speaker offers an extended metaphor which compares his love to Summer. Shakespeare also makes use of extended metaphors in Romeo and Juliet, most notably in the balcony scene where Romeo offers an extended metaphor comparing Juliet to the sun.

It is the east, and Juliet is the sun.
Arise, fair sun, and kill the envious moon,
Who is already sick and pale with grief,
That thou her maid art far more fair than she:
Be not her maid, since she is envious;
Her vestal livery is but sick and green
And none but fools do wear it; cast it off.

== Metaphysical conceit ==
The metaphysical conceit is often imaginative, exploring specific parts of an experience. A frequently cited example is found in John Donne's "A Valediction: Forbidding Mourning", in which a couple faced with absence from each other is likened to the legs of a compass. In comparison with the earlier conceit, the metaphysical conceit has a startling, unusual quality: Robert H. Ray described it as a "lengthy, far-fetched, ingenious analogy". The analogy is developed throughout multiple lines, sometimes the entire poem. Poet and critic Samuel Johnson was not enamored with this conceit, critiquing its use of "dissimilar images" and the "discovery of occult resemblances in things apparently unlike". His judgment, that the conceit was a device in which "the most heterogeneous ideas are yoked by violence together", is often cited and held sway until the early twentieth century, when poets like T. S. Eliot re-evaluated the English poetry of the seventeenth century. Well-known poets employing this type of conceit include John Donne, Andrew Marvell, and George Herbert.

== Later examples ==
=== T. S. Eliot ===
Audiobook of "The Love Song of J. Alfred Prufrock" by T. S. Eliot

In the following passage from "The Love Song of J. Alfred Prufrock", T. S. Eliot provides an example of an extended metaphor:

The yellow fog that rubs its back upon the window-panes,
The yellow smoke that rubs its muzzle on the window-panes
Licked its tongue into the corners of the evening,
Lingered upon the pools that stand in drains,
Let fall upon its back the soot that falls from chimneys,
Slipped by the terrace, made a sudden leap,
And seeing that it was a soft October night,
Curled once about the house, and fell asleep.

Qualities (grounds) that we associate with cats (vehicle), color, rubbing, muzzling, licking, slipping, leaping, curling, sleeping, are used to describe the fog (tenor).

=== James Joyce ===
Joyce's Ulysses features an extended metaphor between its characters and those of the Ancient Greek epic, The Odyssey. Leopold Bloom maps to Odysseus, Stephen Dedalus maps to Telemachus, and Molly Bloom maps to Penelope; minor characters also demonstrate parallels, such as the one-eyed "Cyclops" character which Bloom interacts with. Used as a hypotext, many readers at the time of publication did not necessarily notice the connection, until it was pointed out by T.S. Eliot’s essay on the subject.

== See also ==
- Allegory
- Literary technique
- Stylistic device
- Objective Correlative
- Externalization (psychology)
