= Go and Catch a Falling Star =

Poem by John Donne

Song: Go and Catch a Falling Star
- by John Donne
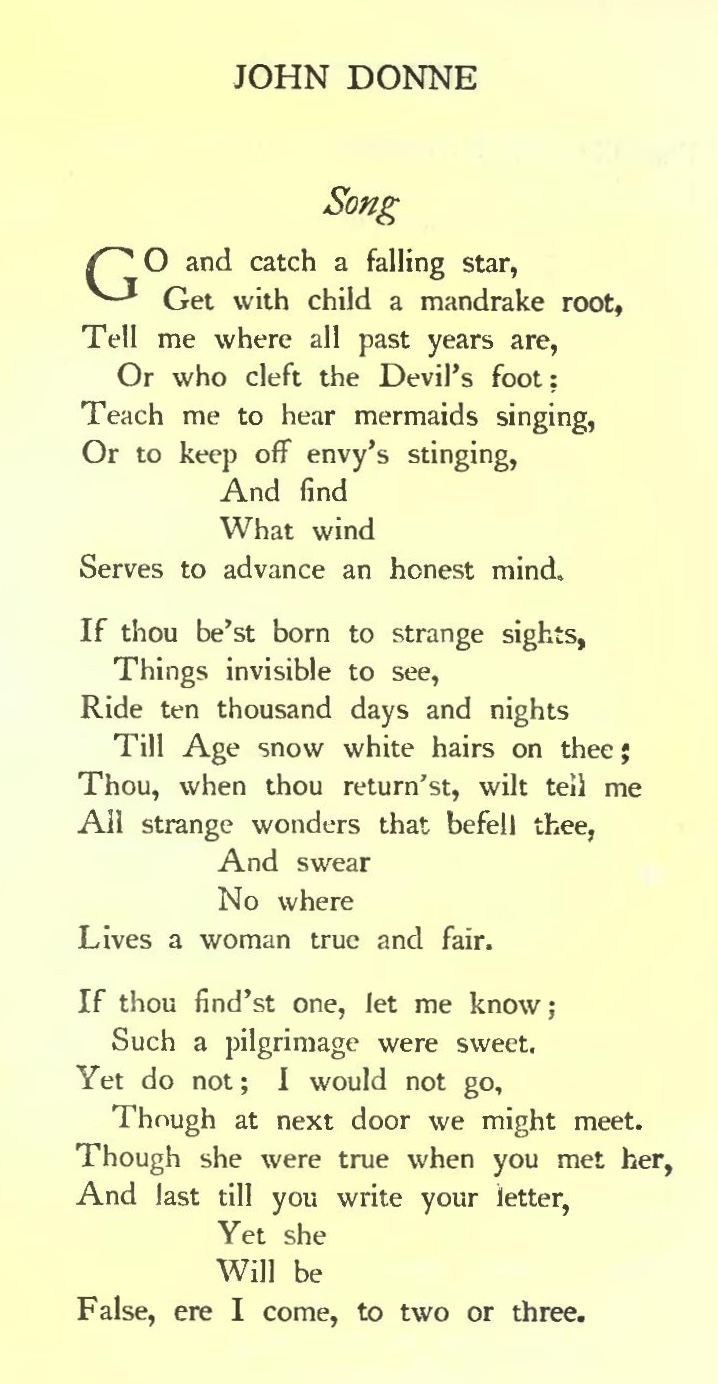
- Song: Go and catch a falling star, from the anthology The Oxford Book of English Verse
- Original title: Song
- First published in: 1633
- Country: Kingdom of England
- Language: English
- Genre(s): Metaphysical poem, Satire, Cynicism
- Rhyme scheme: ABABCCDDD
- Lines: 27

Song: Go and Catch a Falling Star, also known simply as Song, is a poem by John Donne, one of the leading English metaphysical poets. Probably first passed round in manuscript during the final decade of the 16th century, it was not published until the first edition of Donne's collected poems in 1633 - two years after the poet's death. The poem conveys a humorously misogynistic theme that criticizes women's supposedly inevitable infidelity. It is written in a lyrical form consisting of three stanzas rhyming ABABCCDDD, with lines that vary in length in a regular sequence. The first stanza demands a variety of impossible feats and the second suggests a life-long journey in search of the marvellous. For the speaker, finding female constancy is an impossibility or - the third stanza reflects - should such a rarity be discovered, it would not last.
