= John Donne the Younger =

English clergyman and writer

John Donne the Younger (circa May 1604–buried 3 February 1662) was an English clergyman and writer.

== Life ==
John Donne the Younger was the son of the poet John Donne, born about May 1604. He was educated at Westminster School and then elected a student at Christ Church, Oxford, in 1622. He appears to have taken the degrees of B.A. and M.A. in the usual course, but was notorious for his dissipated habits. At the time of his father's death, he was in England, and he managed to get possession of all the books and papers which had been bequeathed to Dr. John King and to retain them in his own hands during his life.

On 31 October 1633, while riding with a friend in St. Aldate's Oxford, an eight-year-old boy startled one of the horses, whereupon Donne struck the child on his head four or five times with his riding-whip. The injured boy died on 22 November. William Laud was vice-chancellor at the time, and Donne was put upon his trial for manslaughter, but acquitted. He left England after this, and went to Padua, at which university he took the degree of doctor of laws, and on his return was incorporated at Oxford with the same degree on 30 June 1638. About this time, he was admitted to holy orders. On 10 July, he was presented to the rectory of High Roding in Essex; on 29 May 1639 to the rectory of Ufford in Northamptonshire; and on 10 June of the same year to the rectory of Fulbeck in Lincolnshire. He resided at none of them. He was chaplain to Basil, Earl of Denbigh, to whom he dedicated the second volume of his father's sermons.

During the Civil War, he was an object of suspicion to the parliamentarians, and, in 1644, wrote, "Since the beginning of the war my study was often searched, and all my books and almost my brains by their continual alarms sequestered for the use of the committee." A few years later, the following entry appears in the Lords' Journals: "Wed. 14 June 1648. Upon reading the petition of Dr. John Donne, chaplain to the Earl of Denbigh, who is arrested contrary to the privilege of parliament, it is ordered that it is referred to the committee of privileges to consider whether the said Dr. Donne be capable of the privilege of parliament or no, and report the same to this house."

Donne died in the winter of 1662, at his house in Covent Garden, where he appears to have lived for the last twenty years of his life, and was buried on 3 February at the west end of St Paul's Church, Covent Garden.

The remnants of his father's books and papers were given by him to Izaak Walton, the younger, and some of them are to be found in Salisbury Cathedral Library.

Anthony à Wood said of Donne that "He had all the advantages imaginable tendered to him to tread in the steps of his virtuous father, but his nature being vile, he proved no better all his lifetime than an atheistical buffoon, a banterer, and a person of over free thoughts" but goes in to add that he was valued by King Charles II, and that "There is no doubt but that he was a man of sense, and parts; which, had they been applied to a good use, he might have proved beneficial in his generation."

== Writings ==
Some months before his death, Donne issued a volume entitled Donne's Satyr; containing a short map of Mundane Vanity, a cabinet of Merry Conceits, certain pleasant propositions and questions, with their merry solutions and answers.
