= John Donne =

English poet and cleric (1572–1631)

The Very Reverend John Donne
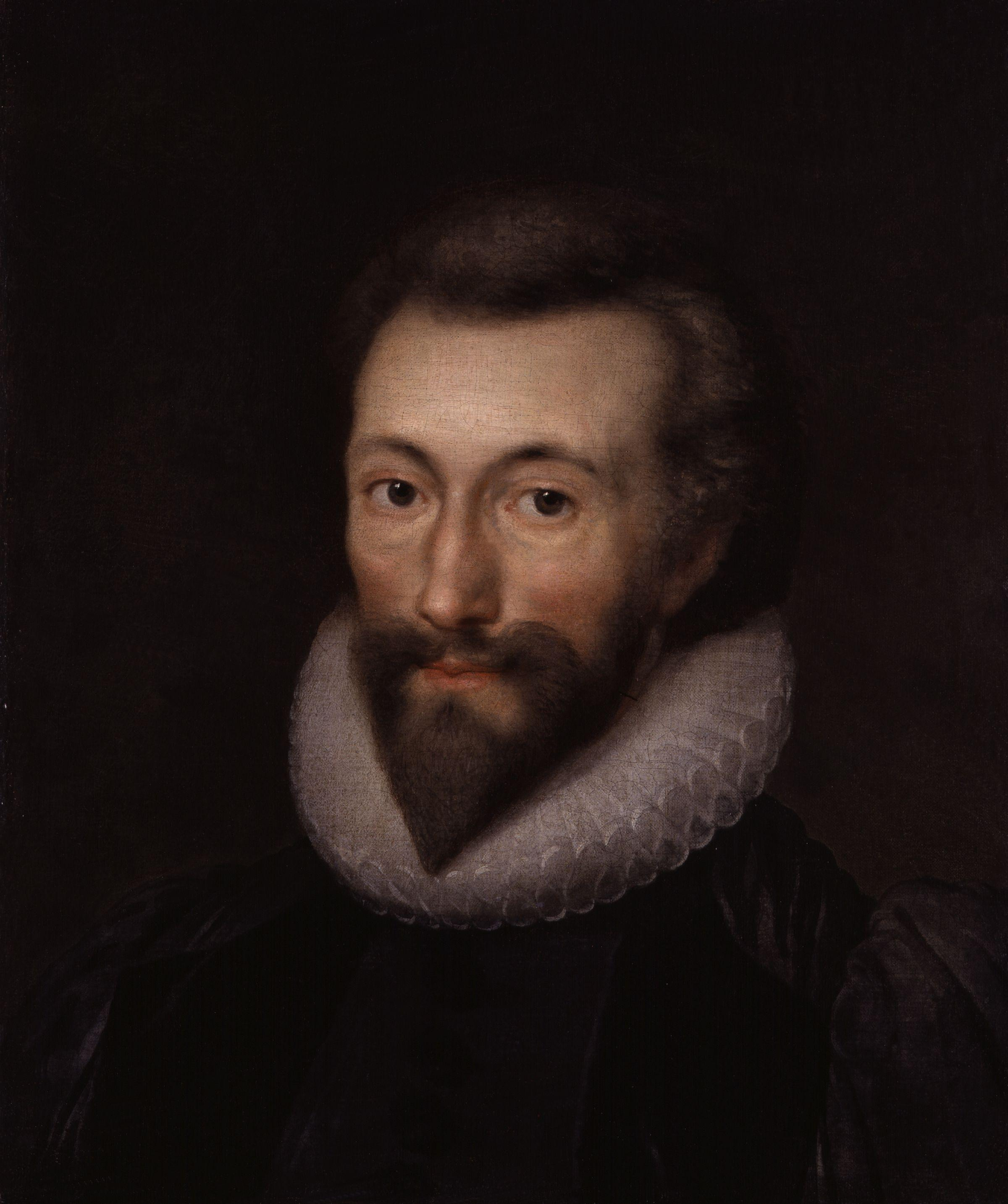
- Portrait by Isaac Oliver, 1616
- Born: 1571 or 1572 (Note: Biographer John Stubbs points out that, although Donne is known to have been born between January and June, the year is uncertain because of confusion between Old Style and New Style dates.); London, England
- Died: 31 March 1631 (aged 59); London, England
- Education: Hart Hall, Oxford; University of Cambridge
- Occupations: Poet; priest; lawyer
- Spouse: Anne More (m. 1601; died 1617)
- Children: 12 (incl. John and George)
- Relatives: Edward Alleyn (son-in-law)
- Writing career
- Genres: Satire, love poetry, elegy, sermons
- Subjects: Love, sexuality, religion, death
- Movement: Metaphysical poetry

John Donne (/dʌn/ DUN; 1571 or 1572 – 31 March 1631) was an English poet, scholar, soldier and secretary born into a recusant family, who later became a cleric in the Church of England. Under royal patronage, he was made Dean of St Paul's Cathedral in London (1621–1631). He is considered the preeminent representative of the metaphysical poets. His poetical works are noted for their metaphorical and sensual style and include sonnets, love poems, religious poems, Latin translations, epigrams, elegies, songs and satires. He is also known for his sermons.

Donne's style is characterised by abrupt openings and various paradoxes, ironies and dislocations. These features, along with his frequent dramatic or everyday speech rhythms, his tense syntax and his tough eloquence, were both a reaction against the smoothness of conventional Elizabethan poetry and an adaptation into English of European baroque and mannerist techniques. His early career was marked by poetry that bore immense knowledge of English society. A theme in Donne's later poetry is the idea of true religion, something that he spent much time considering and about which he often theorised. He wrote secular poems as well as erotic and love poems. He is particularly famous for his mastery of metaphysical conceits.

Despite his great education and poetic talents, Donne lived in poverty for several years, relying heavily on wealthy friends. This was as a result of his secret marriage to Anne More, with whom he eventually had twelve children. He served as a member of Parliament in 1601 and in 1614. In 1615 he unwillingly was ordained Anglican deacon and then priest at the king's insistence.

== Biography ==
=== Early life ===
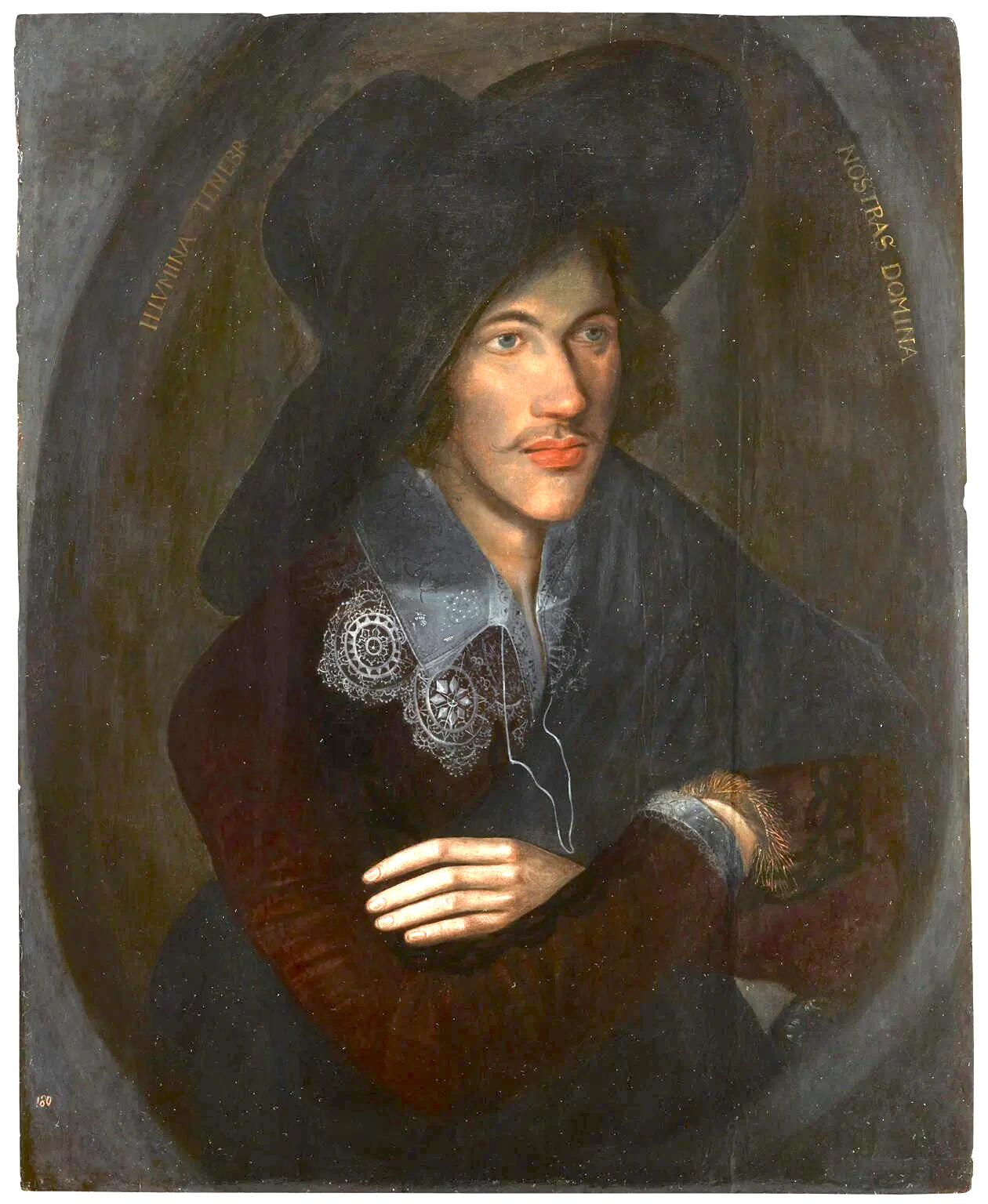
A portrait of Donne as a young man, c. 1595, in the National Portrait Gallery, London

Donne was born in London in 1571 or 1572, into a recusant Roman Catholic family when practice of that religion was illegal in England. Donne was the third of six children. His father, also named John Donne, was married to Elizabeth Heywood. He was of Welsh descent and a warden of the Ironmongers Company in the City of London. He avoided unwelcome government attention out of fear of religious persecution.

His father died in 1576, when Donne was four years old, leaving his mother, Elizabeth, with the responsibility of raising the children alone. Heywood was also from a recusant Roman Catholic family, the daughter of John Heywood, the playwright, and sister of the Reverend Jasper Heywood, a Jesuit priest and translator. She was a great-niece of Thomas More. A few months after her husband died, Donne's mother married John Syminges, a wealthy widower with three children of his own.

Donne was educated privately. There is no evidence to support the popular claim that he was taught by Jesuits. In 1583, at the age of 11, he began studies at Hart Hall, now Hertford College, Oxford. After three years of studies there, Donne was admitted to the University of Cambridge, where he studied for another three years. Donne could not obtain a degree from either institution because of his Catholicism, since he refused to take the Oath of Supremacy required to graduate. In 1591 he was accepted as a student at the Thavie's Inn legal school, one of the Inns of Chancery in London. On 6 May 1592, he was admitted to Lincoln's Inn, one of the Inns of Court.

In 1593, five years after the defeat of the Spanish Armada and during the intermittent Anglo-Spanish War (1585–1604), Queen Elizabeth issued the first English statute against sectarian dissent from the Church of England, titled "An Act for restraining Popish recusants". It defined "Popish recusants" as those "convicted for not repairing to some Church, Chapel, or usual place of Common Prayer to hear Divine Service there, but forbearing the same contrary to the tenor of the laws and statutes heretofore made and provided in that behalf". Donne's brother Henry was also a university student prior to his arrest in 1593 for harbouring a Catholic priest, William Harrington, and died in Newgate Prison of bubonic plague, leading Donne to begin questioning his Catholic faith.

During and after his education, Donne spent much of his considerable inheritance on women, literature, pastimes and travel. Although no record details precisely where Donne travelled, he crossed Europe. He later fought alongside the Earl of Essex and Sir Walter Raleigh against the Spanish at Cádiz (1596) and the Azores (1597), and witnessed the loss of the Spanish flagship, the San Felipe. According to Izaak Walton, his earliest biographer,

... he returned not back into England till he had stayed some years, first in Italy, and then in Spain, where he made many useful observations of those countries, their laws and manner of government, and returned perfect in their languages.

— Walton 1888, p. 20

By the age of 25 he was well prepared for the diplomatic career he appeared to be seeking. He was appointed chief secretary to the Lord Keeper of the Great Seal, Sir Thomas Egerton, and was established at Egerton's London home, York House, Strand, close to the Palace of Whitehall, then the most influential social centre in England.

=== Marriage to Anne More ===
During the next four years, Donne fell in love with Egerton's niece Anne More. They were secretly married just before Christmas in 1601, against the wishes of both Egerton and Anne's father George More, who was Lieutenant of the Tower. Upon discovery, this wedding ruined Donne's career, getting him dismissed and put in Fleet Prison, along with the Church of England priest Samuel Brooke, who married them, and his brother Christopher, who stood in, in the absence of George More, to give Anne away. Donne was released shortly thereafter when the marriage was proved to be valid, and he soon secured the release of the other two. Walton tells us that when Donne wrote to his wife to tell her about losing his post, he wrote after his name: John Donne, Anne Donne, Un-done. It was not until 1609 that Donne was reconciled with his father-in-law and received his wife's dowry.

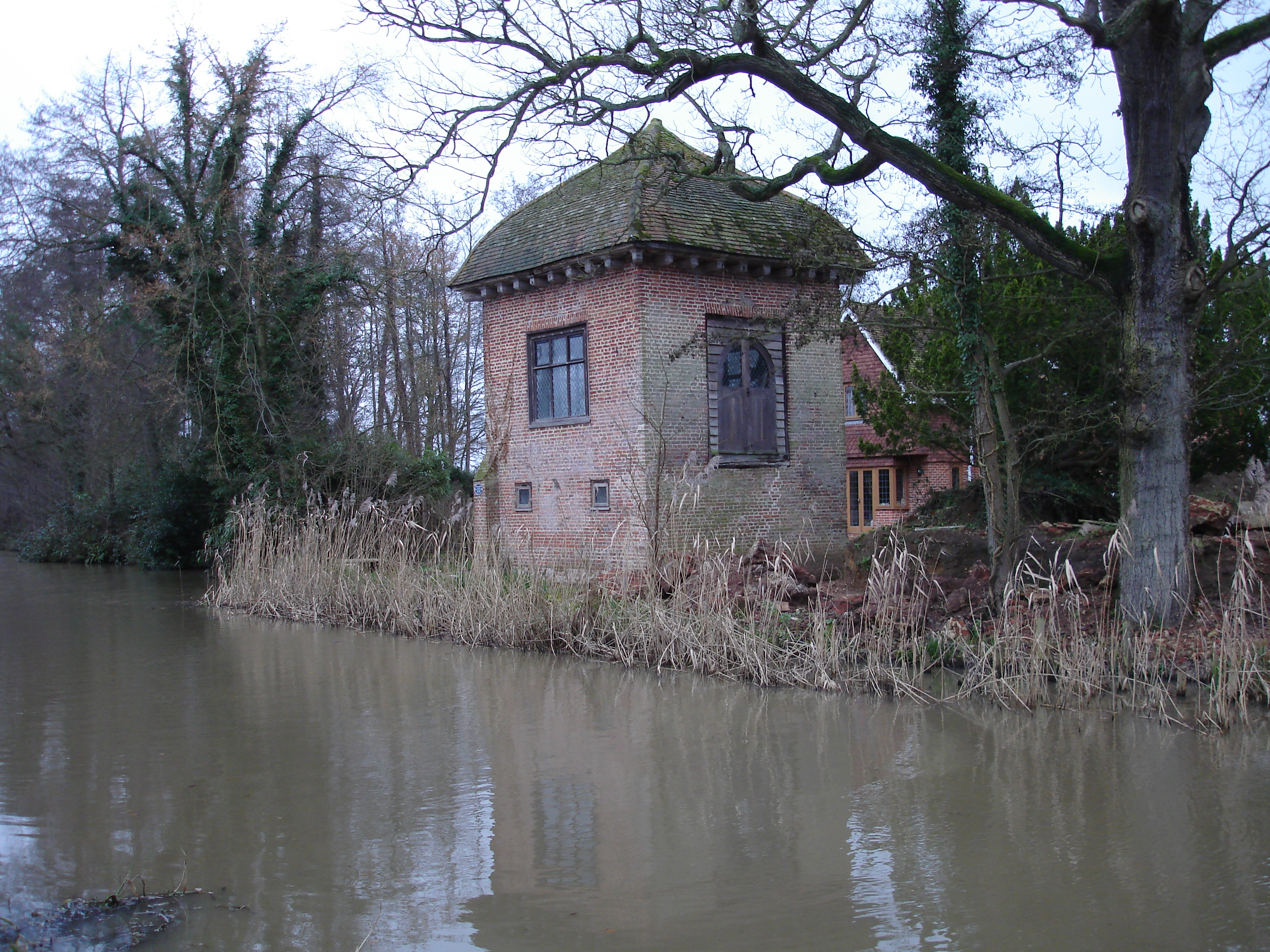
Part of the house where Donne lived in Pyrford

After his release, Donne had to accept a retired country life in a small house in Pyrford, Surrey, owned by Anne's cousin, Sir Francis Wooley, where they lived until the end of 1604. In spring 1605 they moved to another small house in Mitcham, Surrey, where he scraped a meagre living as a lawyer, while Anne Donne bore a new baby almost every year. Though he also worked as an assistant pamphleteer to Thomas Morton writing anti-Catholic pamphlets, Donne was in a constant state of financial insecurity.

Anne gave birth to twelve children in sixteen years of marriage, including two stillbirths—their eighth and then, in 1617, their last child. The ten surviving children were Constance, John, George, Francis, Lucy (named after Donne's patron Lucy, Countess of Bedford, her godmother), Bridget, Mary, Nicholas, Margaret and Elizabeth. Three, Francis, Nicholas and Mary, died before they were ten.

In a state of despair that almost drove him to kill himself, Donne noted that the death of a child would mean one mouth fewer to feed, but he could not afford the burial expenses. During this time, Donne wrote but did not publish Biathanatos, his defence of suicide. His wife died on 15 August 1617, five days after giving birth to their twelfth child, a still-born baby. Donne mourned her deeply, and wrote of his love and loss in his 17th Holy Sonnet.

=== Career and later life ===
In 1602, Donne was elected as a member of parliament (MP) for the constituency of Brackley, but the post was not a paid position. Queen Elizabeth I died in 1603, being succeeded by King James VI of Scotland as King James I of England. The fashion for coterie poetry of the period gave Donne a means to seek patronage. Many of his poems were written for wealthy friends or patrons, especially for MP Sir Robert Drury of Hawsted (1575–1615), whom he met in 1610 and who became his chief patron, furnishing him and his family an apartment in his large house in Drury Lane.

In 1610 and 1611, Donne wrote two anti-Catholic polemics: Pseudo-Martyr and Ignatius His Conclave for Morton. He then wrote two Anniversaries, An Anatomy of the World (1611) and Of the Progress of the Soul (1612) for Drury.

Donne sat as an MP again, this time for Taunton, in the Addled Parliament of 1614. Though he attracted five appointments within its business he made no recorded speech. Although King James was pleased with Donne's work, he refused to reinstate him at court and instead urged him to take holy orders. At length, Donne acceded to the king's wishes, and in 1615 was an ordained priest in the Church of England.

In 1615, Donne was awarded an honorary doctorate in divinity from Cambridge University. He became a Royal Chaplain in the same year. He became a reader of divinity at Lincoln's Inn in 1616, where he served in the chapel as minister until 1622. In 1618, he became chaplain to Viscount Doncaster, who was an ambassador to the princes of Germany. Donne did not return to England until 1620. In 1621, Donne was made Dean of St Paul's, a leading and well-paid position in the Church of England, which he held until his death in 1631.

In 1616, he was granted the living as rector of two parishes, Keyston in Huntingdonshire and Sevenoaks in Kent, and in 1621 of Blunham, in Bedfordshire, all held until his death. Blunham Parish Church has an imposing stained glass window commemorating Donne, designed by Derek Hunt. During Donne's period as dean his daughter Lucy died, aged eighteen. In late November and early December 1623, he suffered a nearly fatal illness, thought to be either typhus or a combination of a cold followed by a period of fever.

During his convalescence he wrote a series of meditations and prayers on health, pain and sickness that were published as a book in 1624 under the title of Devotions upon Emergent Occasions. One of these meditations, Meditation XVII, contains the well-known phrases "No man is an Iland" (usually modernised as "No man is an island") and "for whom the bell tolls". In 1624, he became vicar of St Dunstan-in-the-West, and in 1625 a prolocutor to Charles I. He earned a reputation as an eloquent preacher. 160 of his sermons have survived, including Death's Duel, his famous sermon delivered at the Palace of Whitehall before King Charles I in February 1631.

=== Death ===
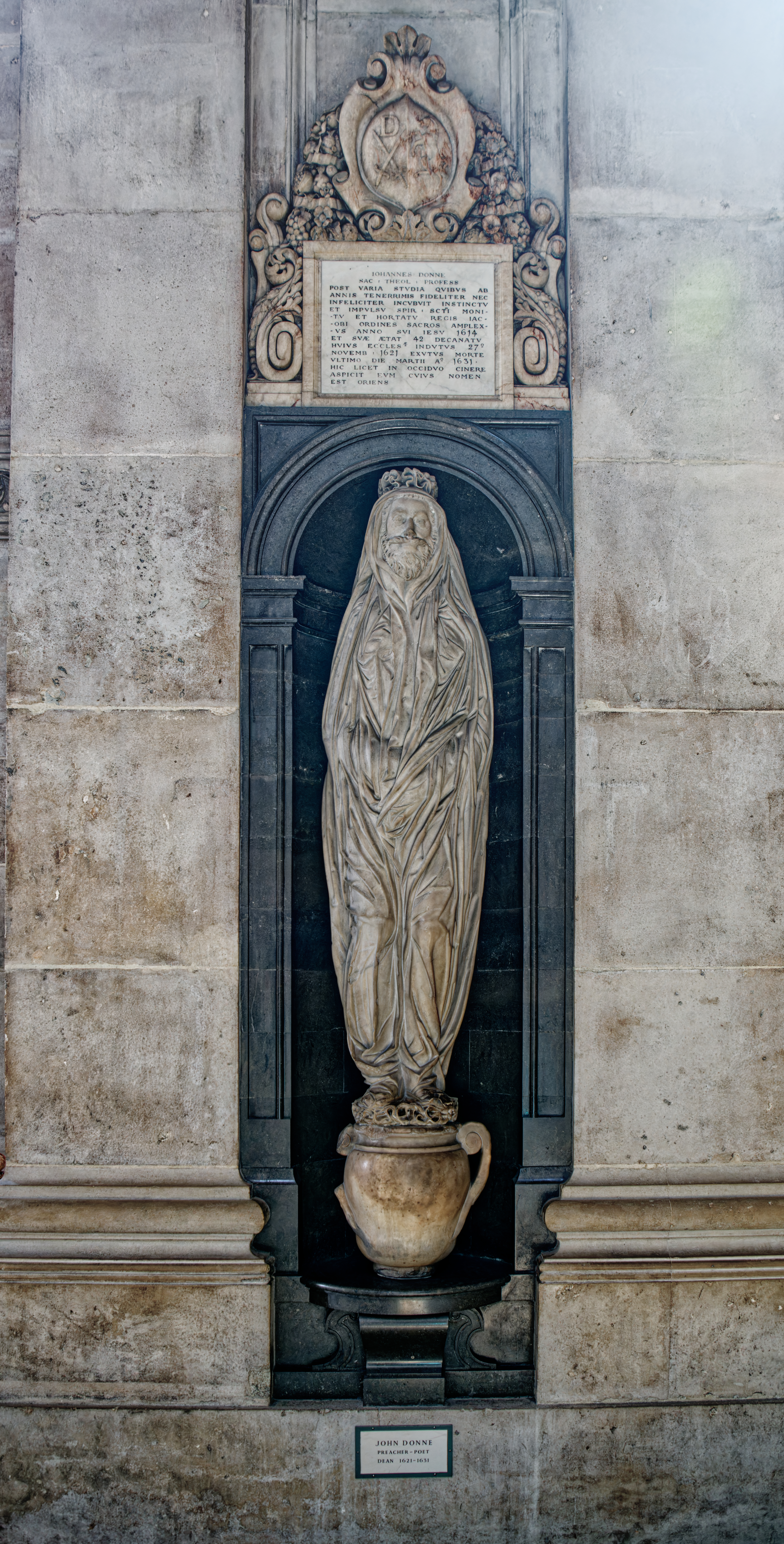
The memorial to John Donne, St Paul's Cathedral

Donne suffered a violent fever in 1630, aged about 58, and he heard the rumour that he was dead, commenting, 'A man would almost be content to die ... to hear of so much sorrow and so much good testimony from good men as I (God be blessed for it) did upon the report of my death.'

Donne died on 31 March 1631. He was buried in old St Paul's Cathedral, where a memorial statue of him by Nicholas Stone was erected with a Latin epigraph probably composed by himself. The memorial was one of the few to survive the Great Fire of London in 1666 and is now in St Paul's Cathedral. The statue was said by Izaac Walton in his biography, to have been modelled from the life by Donne to suggest his appearance at the resurrection. It started a vogue of such monuments during the 17th century. In 2012, a bust of the poet by Nigel Boonham was unveiled outside in the cathedral churchyard.

== Writings ==
Donne's earliest poems showed a developed knowledge of English society coupled with sharp criticism of its problems. His satires dealt with common Elizabethan topics, such as corruption in the legal system, mediocre poets and pompous courtiers. His images of sickness, vomit, manure and plague reflected his strongly satiric view of a society populated by fools and knaves. His third satire, however, deals with the problem of true religion, a matter of great importance to Donne. He argued that it was better to examine carefully one's religious convictions than blindly to follow any established tradition, for none would be saved at the Final Judgment, by claiming "A Harry, or a Martin taught [them] this."

Donne's early career was also notable for his erotic poetry, especially his elegies, in which he employed unconventional metaphors, such as a flea biting two lovers being compared to sex. Donne did not publish these poems, although they circulated widely in manuscript form. One such, a previously unknown manuscript that is believed to be one of the largest contemporary collections of Donne's work (among that of others), was found at Melford Hall in November 2018.

Some have speculated that Donne's numerous illnesses, financial strain and the deaths of his friends all contributed to the development of a more sombre and pious tone in his later poems. The change can be clearly seen in "An Anatomy of the World" (1611), a poem that Donne wrote in memory of Elizabeth Drury, daughter of his patron, Sir Robert Drury of Hawstead, Suffolk. This poem treats Elizabeth's demise with extreme gloominess, using it as a symbol for the fall of man and the destruction of the universe.

The increasing gloominess of Donne's tone may also be observed in the religious works that he began writing during the same period. Having converted to the Anglican Church, Donne quickly became noted for his sermons and religious poems. Towards the end of his life Donne wrote works that challenged death, and the fear that it inspired in many, on the grounds of his belief that those who die are sent to Heaven to live eternally. One example of this challenge is his Holy Sonnet X, "Death Be Not Proud".

Even as he lay dying during Lent in 1631, he rose from his sickbed and delivered the Death's Duel sermon, which was later described as his own funeral sermon. Death's Duel portrays life as a steady descent to suffering and death; death becomes merely another process of life, in which the 'winding sheet' of the womb is the same as that of the grave. Hope is seen in salvation and immortality through an embrace of God, Christ and the Resurrection.

== Style ==
His work has received much criticism over the years, especially concerning his metaphysical form. Donne is generally considered the most prominent member of the metaphysical poets, a phrase coined in 1781 by Samuel Johnson, following a comment on Donne by John Dryden. Dryden had written of Donne in 1693: "He affects the metaphysics, not only in his satires, but in his amorous verses, where nature only should reign; and perplexes the minds of the fair sex with nice speculations of philosophy, when he should engage their hearts, and entertain them with the softnesses of love."

In Life of Cowley (from Samuel Johnson's 1781 work of biography and criticism Lives of the Most Eminent English Poets), Johnson refers to the beginning of the 17th century in which there "appeared a race of writers that may be termed the metaphysical poets". Donne's immediate successors in poetry therefore tended to regard his works with ambivalence, with the Neoclassical poets regarding his conceits as abuse of the metaphor. However, he was revived by Romantic poets such as Coleridge and Browning, though his more recent revival in the early 20th century by poets such as T. S. Eliot and critics like F. R. Leavis tended to portray him, with approval, as an anti-Romantic.

Donne is considered a master of the metaphysical conceit, an extended metaphor that combines two vastly different ideas into a single idea, often using imagery. An example of this is his equation of lovers with saints in "The Canonization". Unlike the conceits found in other Elizabethan poetry, most notably Petrarchan conceits, which formed clichéd comparisons between more closely related objects (such as a rose and love), metaphysical conceits go to a greater depth in comparing two completely unlike objects. One of the most famous of Donne's conceits is found in "A Valediction: Forbidding Mourning" where he compares the apartness of two separated lovers to the working of the legs of a compass.

Donne's works are also witty, employing paradoxes, puns and subtle yet remarkable analogies. His pieces are often ironic and cynical, especially regarding love and human motives. Common subjects of Donne's poems are love (especially in his early life), death (especially after his wife's death) and religion.

John Donne's poetry represented a shift from classical forms to more personal poetry. Donne is noted for his poetic metre, which was structured with changing and jagged rhythms that closely resemble casual speech (it was for this that the more classical-minded Ben Jonson commented that "Donne, for not keeping of accent, deserved hanging").

Some scholars believe that Donne's literary works reflect the changing trends of his life, with love poetry and satires from his youth and religious sermons during his later years. Other scholars, such as Helen Gardner, question the validity of this dating—most of his poems were published posthumously (1633). The exception to these is his Anniversaries, which were published in 1612 and Devotions upon Emergent Occasions published in 1624. His sermons are also dated, sometimes specifically by date and year.

== Legacy ==
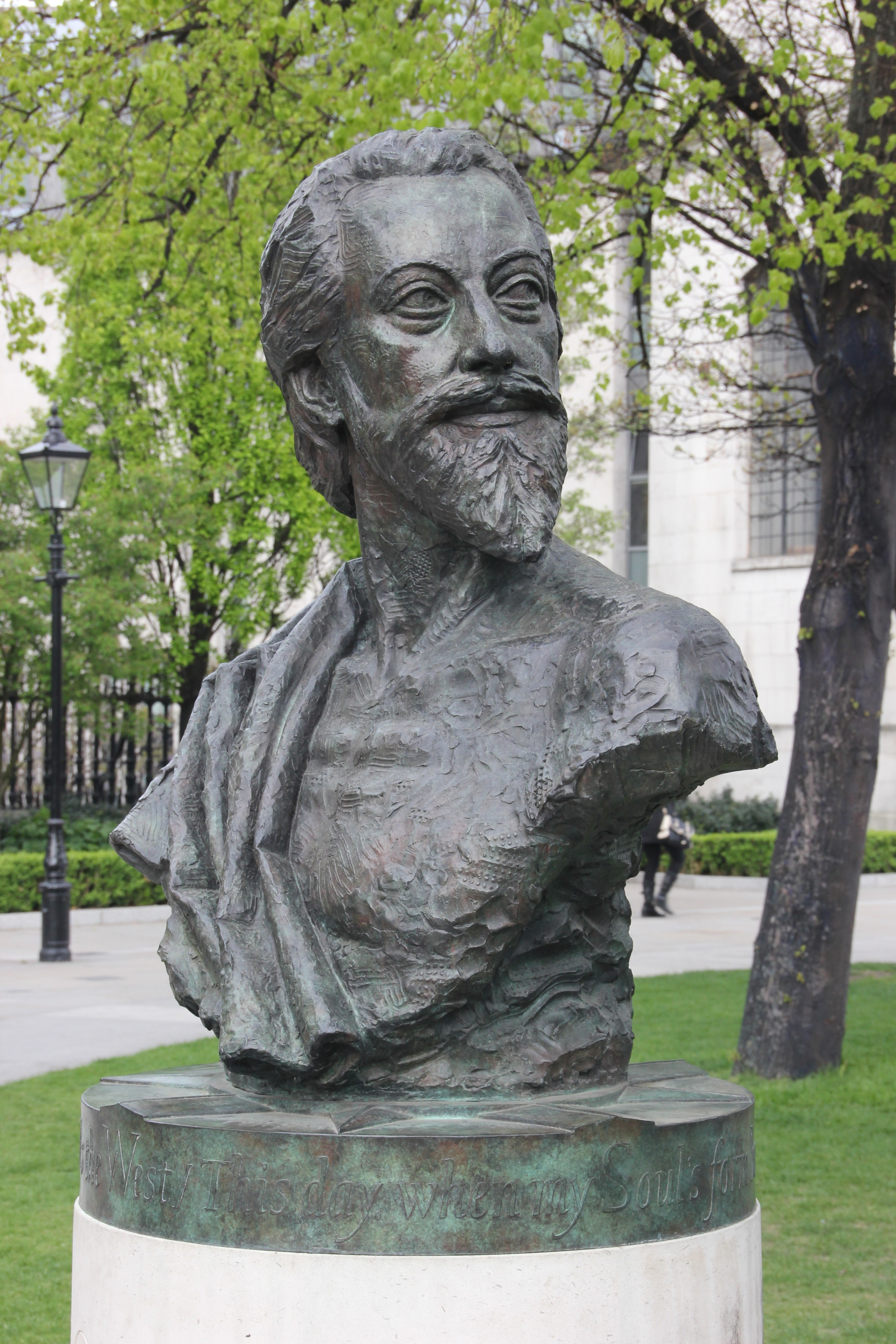
John Donne Memorial by Nigel Boonham, 2012, St Paul's Cathedral Churchyard

Donne is remembered in the Calendar of Saints of the Church of England, the Episcopal Church liturgical calendar and the Calendar of Saints of the Evangelical Lutheran Church in America for his life as both poet and priest. His commemoration is on 31 March.

During his lifetime several likenesses were made of the poet. The earliest was the anonymous portrait of 1594 now in the National Portrait Gallery, London, which was restored in 2012. One of the earliest Elizabethan portraits of an author, the fashionably dressed poet is shown darkly brooding on his love. The portrait was described in Donne's will as "that picture of myne wych is taken in the shaddowes", and bequeathed by him to Robert Kerr, 1st Earl of Ancram. Other paintings include a 1616 head and shoulders after Isaac Oliver, also in the National Portrait Gallery, and a 1622 head and shoulders in the Victoria and Albert Museum. In 1911, the young Stanley Spencer devoted a visionary painting to John Donne arriving in heaven (1911) which is now in the Fitzwilliam Museum.

Donne's reception until the 20th century was influenced by the publication of his writings in the 17th century. Because Donne avoided publication during his life, the majority of his works were brought to the press by others in the decades after his death. These publications present what Erin McCarthy calls a "teleological narrative of Donne's growth" from young rake "Jack Donne" to reverend divine "Dr. Donne". For example, while the first edition of Poems, by J. D. (1633) mingled amorous and pious verse indiscriminately, all editions after 1635 separated poems into "Songs and Sonnets" and "Divine Poems". This organization "promulgated the tale of Jack Donne's transformation into Doctor Donne and made it the dominant way of understanding Donne's life and work."

A similar effort to justify Donne's early writings appeared in the publication of his prose. This pattern can be seen in a 1652 volume that combines texts from throughout Donne's career, including flippant works like Ignatius His Conclave and more pious writings like Essays in Divinity. In the preface, Donne's son "unifies the otherwise disparate texts around an impression of Donne's divinity" by comparing his father's varied writing to Jesus' miracles. Christ "began his first Miracle here, by turning Water into Wine, and made it his last to ascend from Earth to Heaven."

Donne first wrote "things conducing to cheerfulness & entertainment of Mankind," and later "change[d] his conversation from Men to Angels." Another figure who contributed to Donne's legacy as a rake-turned-preacher was Donne's first biographer Izaak Walton. Walton's biography separated Donne's life into two stages, comparing Donne's life to the transformation of St. Paul. Walton writes, "where [Donne] had been a Saul… in his irregular youth," he became "a Paul, and preach[ed] salvation to his brethren."

The idea that Donne's writings reflect two distinct stages of his life remains common; however, many scholars have challenged this understanding. In 1948, Evelyn Simpson wrote, "a close study of his works... makes it clear that his was no case of dual personality. He was not a Jekyll-Hyde in Jacobean dress... There is an essential unity underlying the flagrant and manifold contradictions of his temperament."

=== In literature ===
After Donne's death, a number of poetical tributes were paid to him, of which one of the principal (and most difficult to follow) was his friend Lord Herbert of Cherbury's "Elegy for Doctor Donne". Posthumous editions of Donne's poems were accompanied by several "Elegies upon the Author" over the course of the next two centuries. Six of these were written by fellow churchmen, others by such courtly writers as Thomas Carew, Sidney Godolphin and Endymion Porter. In 1963 came Joseph Brodsky's "The Great Elegy for John Donne".

Beginning in the 20th century, several historical novels appeared taking as their subject various episodes in Donne's life. His courtship of Anne More is the subject of Elizabeth Gray Vining's Take Heed of Loving Me: A novel about John Donne (1963) and Maeve Haran's The Lady and the Poet (2010). Both characters also make interspersed appearances in Mary Novik's Conceit (2007), where the main focus is on their rebellious daughter Pegge. English treatments include Garry O'Connor's Death's Duel: a novel of John Donne (2015), which deals with the poet as a young man.

He also plays a significant role in Christie Dickason's The Noble Assassin (2012), a novel based on the life of Donne's patron and (the author claims) his lover, Lucy Russell, Countess of Bedford. Finally there is Bryan Crockett's Love's Alchemy: a John Donne Mystery (2015), in which the poet, blackmailed into service in Robert Cecil's network of spies, attempts to avert political disaster and at the same time outwit Cecil.

=== Musical settings ===
There were musical settings of Donne's lyrics even during his lifetime and in the century following his death. These included Alfonso Ferrabosco the younger's ("So, so, leave off this last lamenting kisse" in his 1609 Ayres); John Cooper's ("The Message"); Henry Lawes' ("Break of Day"); John Dowland's ("Break of Day" and "To ask for all thy love"); and settings of "A Hymn to God the Father" by John Hilton the younger and Pelham Humfrey (published 1688).

After the 17th century, there were no more until the start of the 20th century with Havergal Brian ("A nocturnal on St Lucy's Day", first performed in 1905), Eleanor Everest Freer ("Break of Day, published in 1905) and Walford Davies ("The Cross", 1909) among the earliest. In 1916–18, the composer Hubert Parry set Donne's "Holy Sonnet 7" ("At the round earth's imagined corners") to music in his choral work, Songs of Farewell. Regina Hansen Willman set Donne's "First Holy Sonnet" for voice and string trio. In 1945, Benjamin Britten set nine of Donne's Holy Sonnets in his song cycle for voice and piano The Holy Sonnets of John Donne. in 1968, Williametta Spencer used Donne's text for her choral work "At the Round Earth's Imagined Corners." Among them is also the choral setting of "Negative Love" that opens Harmonium (1981), as well as the aria setting of "Holy Sonnet XIV" at the end of the 1st act of Doctor Atomic, both by John Adams.

There have been settings in popular music as well. One is the version of the song "Go and Catch a Falling Star" on John Renbourn's debut album John Renbourn (1966), in which the last line is altered to "False, ere I count one, two, three". On their 1992 album Duality, the English Neoclassical dark wave band In the Nursery used a recitation of the entirety of Donne's "A Valediction: Forbidding Mourning" for the track "Mecciano" and an augmented version of "A Fever" for the track "Corruption." Prose texts by Donne have also been set to music. In 1954, Priaulx Rainier set some in her Cycle for Declamation for solo voice. In 2009, the American Jennifer Higdon composed the choral piece On the Death of the Righteous, based on Donne's sermons. More recent is the Russian minimalist Anton Batagov's " I Fear No More, selected songs and meditations of John Donne" (2015).

== Works ==
Most of Donne's works were published after his death. The list below orders his works by date of first publication.

=== Poetry ===
- The First Anniversary: An Anatomy of the World (written and published 1611)
- The Second Anniversary: Of the Progress of the Soul (written 1611–12, published 1612)
- A Hymn to God the Father (written 1623–24, published 1627)
- Poems (published 1633) (the first collected edition of Donne’s poems)
  - A Valediction: Forbidding Mourning (written 1611)
  - Go and Catch a Falling Star (written 1590s)
  - Holy Sonnets (written 1609–10 and 1617)
    - As Due By Many Titles (written 1609–10)
    - Batter my heart, three-person'd God (written 1609–10)
    - Death Be Not Proud (written 1609–10)
    - Holy Sonnet IX (written 1609–10)
    - If Faithful Souls (written 1609–10)
  - The Canonization (written 1590s – early 1600s)
  - The Dream (written 1590s)
  - The Flea (written 1590s)
  - The Good-Morrow (written 1590s)
  - The Sun Rising (written 1590s)
- Poems on Several Occasions (published 1650)
  - Elegy XIX: To His Mistress Going to Bed (written 1590s)

=== Prose ===
- Pseudo-Martyr (written and published 1610)
- Ignatius His Conclave (written 1610–11, published 1611)
- Devotions upon Emergent Occasions (written 1623, published 1624)
- Biathanatos (written 1608, published 1647)
- Essays in Divinity (written 1614–15, published 1651)
