= Apostrophe (figure of speech) =

Figure of speech used in theatre

An apostrophe is an exclamatory figure of speech. It occurs when a speaker breaks off from addressing the audience (e.g., in a play) and directs speech to a third party such as an opposing litigant or some other individual, sometimes absent from the scene. Often the addressee is a personified abstract quality or inanimate object. In dramatic works and poetry written in or translated into English, such a figure of speech is often introduced by the vocative exclamation, "O". Poets may apostrophize a beloved, the Muses, God or gods, love, time, or any other entity that can't respond in reality.

== Examples ==
- "And you, Eumaeus ...", Homer, the Odyssey, 14.55, κτλ ...
- "O black night, nurse of the golden eyes!", Electra in Euripides's, Electra, (c. 410 BC, line 54), in the translation by David Kovacs (1998.)
- "O death, where is thy sting? O grave, where is thy victory?", 1 Corinthians 15:55, Paul the Apostle
- "O My friends, there is no friend." Montaigne, originally attributed to Aristotle
- "O eloquent, just, and mighty Death!", Walter Raleigh, A Historie of the World
- "Then come, sweet death, and rid me of this grief.", queen Isabel in Edward II; by Christopher Marlowe.
- "O, pardon me, thou bleeding piece of earth, / That I am meek and gentle with these butchers! / Thou art the ruins of the noblest man / That ever lived in the tide of times.", William Shakespeare, Julius Caesar, act 3, scene 1
- "O happy dagger! This is thy sheath; there rest, and let me die.", Romeo and Juliet, act 5, scene 3, 169–170
- "Death, be not proud, though some have called thee / Mighty and dreadful, for thou art not so.", John Donne, Holy Sonnet X
- "Thou glorious sun!", Samuel Coleridge, This Lime-Tree Bower
- "Roll on, thou dark and deep blue Ocean – roll!", Lord Byron, Childe Harold's Pilgrimage
- "To what green altar, O mysterious priest, / Lead'st thou that heifer lowing at the skies, / And all her silken flanks with garlands drest?", John Keats, Ode on a Grecian Urn
- "Thou hast the keys of Paradise, oh just, subtle, and mighty opium!", Thomas Quincey, Confessions of an English Opium-Eater

== See also ==
- Anthropomorphism § In literature
- List of narrative techniques
- Fourth wall
- Monologue
- Simile
