= Sue Lenier =

English writer

- Born: Susan Jennifer Lenier; 9 October 1957 (age 68); Birmingham, England
- Occupations: poet and playwright
- Website: www.suelenier.com

Susan Jennifer Lenier (born 9 October 1957) is an English writer. She published two books of poetry and a number of plays.

== Biography ==
Sue Lenier was born in Birmingham, schooled in Tyneside, and attended Clare College, Cambridge. After graduating from Cambridge in 1980, she spend a year writing and performing in Germany and the UK before taking a Harkness Fellowship in the US, where she studied acting and drama at the University of California, Berkeley.

Her first published collection of poems, Swansongs, was published in 1982. It received a favourable review in a British tabloid, the Daily Mirror, and led to sometimes extravagant comparisons to William Shakespeare and Charles Baudelaire. She was hailed by some as a great new poet: Reed Whittemore, a former poetry consultant to the Library of Congress, praised her as "a musician-poet, wholly in love with rhythm and sound"; the late Malcolm Bowie of Queen Mary, University of London, called her "an important writer." This positive praise was not universal: Christopher Reid, writing for The Sunday Times, said that she was "a striving, clumsy, humorless imitator of antiquated modes, with nothing original to say, but an earnest desire to make impressive gestures." Swansongs was published while Lenier was studying in the United States, and the book and her author made enough of an impression to warrant articles by some of the best journalists of prestigious newspapers: D.J.R. Bruckner in the New York Times and Colman McCarthy in the Washington Post.

She published a second volume of poems, Rain Following, also with Oleander Press. While the popular press in America and England showed great interest in Sue Lenier and her work, literary critics and academics took no notice of her work, and only one of her poems, "Finale," from her first volume, has been anthologised.

Since then, her poetic career appears to have ended; the only known works by her have been for the stage. Reportedly, she wrote Doctor's Orders, Eden Song, and Knight Fall, the last two first being performed at the Edinburgh Festival. In 1995, the New Statesman & Society published three of her poems, "Stardom," "Breakdown," and "Hospital Visit"; the magazine also reported a radio play, A Fool And His Heart, was broadcast on Radio Three's Drama Now. According to a British website, a screenplay by Will Davies about the writing of her first book whilst a student at Cambridge has been optioned by Universal Studios.

== Poetic craft ==
The most often noted thing about Lenier's poetic craft was that she composed poetry in an impromptu manner and didn't seem to revise any of her work; Swansong was sent to the publisher as a first-draft copy, and in the New York Times she was quoted, "'I just write the poems straight out. At first I tried to correct a few and I didn't like the corrections, so I don't do it any more." Indeed, for her quick compositions made on the fly she was nicknamed "the possessed poet"—though it was acknowledged that such poetic production easily leads to "superficial glibness." In the same vein, the Los Angeles Times referred to her writing as "the fastest scrawl in the west." This method of composition looked down upon with some disdain by literary critics such as John T. Shawcross in his Intentionality and the New Traditionalism, discussing the "truism of the need for planning and revision": "I am aware of such 'spontaneous' writing as that of Sue Lenier, who boasts of never altering a line after it has been put down, and of some critical assessments that have been quoted to increase sales. I rest my case on the reader's evaluation of her work." The immediate and effusive praise of her first book of poems, and especially John Newton's championship of her poetry, was criticised in a book by David Holbrook, John Newton, Blasphemy and Poetic Taste.

== Bibliography ==
=== Poetry ===
- Lenier, Sue (1982). Swansongs. Cambridge and New York: The Oleander Press. ISBN 0-906672-03-1.
- Lenier, Sue (1984). Rain Following. Cambridge and New York: The Oleander Press. ISBN 978-0-906672-19-8.

=== Drama ===
- Doctor's Orders
- Eden Song
- Knight Fall

=== Radio play ===
A Fool And His Heart (Radio Three, Drama Now)
