= The Holy Sonnets of John Donne =

Song cycle by Benjamin Britten

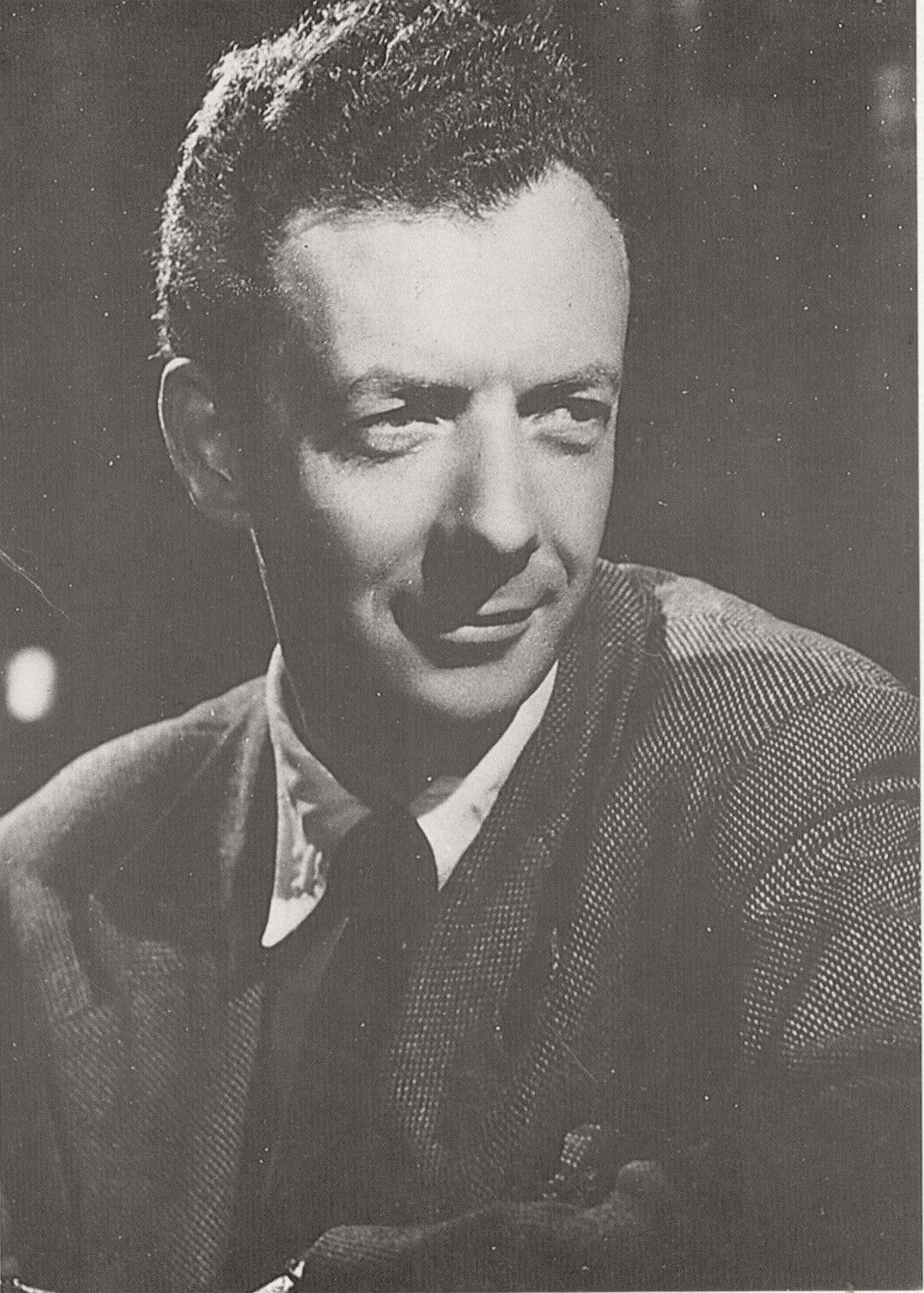
Benjamin Britten in the 1940s

The Holy Sonnets of John Donne is a song cycle composed in 1945 by Benjamin Britten for tenor or soprano voice and piano, and published as his Op. 35. It was written for himself and his life-partner, the tenor Peter Pears, and its first performance was by them at the Wigmore Hall, London on 22 November 1945. Britten began to compose the cycle shortly after visiting, seeing the horrors of, and performing at, the liberated Nazi Bergen-Belsen concentration camp.

The cycle was recorded twice by the original performers : for His Master's Voice in 1947 in London, and for Decca in November 1967 in The Maltings, Snape with John Mordler as producer and Kenneth Wilkinson as engineer.

The cycle consists of settings of nine of the nineteen Holy Sonnets of the English metaphysical poet John Donne (1572–1631). The following numberings are those of the Westmoreland manuscript of 1620, the most complete version of those sonnets.

1. IV: "Oh my blacke Soule! now thou art summoned"
2. XIV: "Batter my heart, three person'd God"
3. III: "Oh might those sighes and teares return againe"
4. XIX: "Oh, to vex me, contraryes meet in one"
5. XIII: "What if this present were the world's last night?"
6. XVII: "Since she whom I lov'd hath pay'd her last debt"
7. VII: "At the round earth's imagined corners"
8. I: "Thou hast made me, and shall thy work decay?"
9. X: "Death be not proud"

The concluding song, "Death be not proud", is a passacaglia, one of Britten's favorite musical forms.
