= Kate Goehring =

American actress

Kate Goehring is an American stage, film and television actress.

== Early life ==
Goehring grew up on Mason's Island. Her father, Edmund Goehring, Sr., was a Commander in the Navy in World War II and a vice president of sales for an electronics company. Her mother, Helen Goehring, was a writer and development director.

Goehring graduated from Oberlin College with a degree in American Romantic Fiction.

== Career ==
=== Film and television ===
Goehring has won Best Performance by An Actor at the York Shorts International Film Festival for her work in the short film Bad Mother. She co-starred in the independent feature Swimmers, and she has appeared in Law & Order, Law & Order: Special Victims Unit and Law & Order: Criminal Intent. Goehring also played Myra Kraft in American Sports Story. She starred opposite David Jason as Detective Grace Wallace in ITV's March in Windy City. Other co-starring roles include Stella, Gossip Girl, One Life to Live, ER, and The Untouchables. Goehring also originated the character of Magenta in the video game Grand Theft Auto V. She has been nominated for a Chicago local Emmy for her performance in John Logan's Moment of Rage, starring Denis O'Hare.

=== Theater ===
Goehring first garnered notice for her Chicago performance in Christopher Durang's Laughing Wild for which she won a Joseph Jefferson Citation. She played Harper Pitt in Tony Kushner's first national tour of Angels in America, which earned her a Miami Carbonell Award. Goehring was in the Broadway production of "The Inheritance", directed by Stephen David Daldry.

Early on in Chicago, Goehring was nominated for a Joseph Jefferson Award for Candida at the Court Theatre. She worked with the Court Theatre, Goodman Theatre, Victory Gardens Theater, Northlight Theatre, and Bailiwick Repertory Theatre. She earned her Equity Card in the process Other more recent credits include playing Vivian Bearing, PhD, in Margaret Edson's Wit, at North Carolina Theatre, for which she won Best Actress in a Play (Broadway World/Raleigh); and Mother Radiunt in the Triad Stage world premiere of Radiunt Abundunt.

Other regional work includes playing Eleanor of Aquitane in the Folger Shakespeare Library production of Shakespeare's "The Life and Death of King John", and Lady Bracknell in "The Importance of Being Earnest" at New York Classical Theatre. Additional regional work includes theaters such as Intiman, A Contemporary Theatre, Arena Stage, the McCarter Theatre, the Huntington Theatre Company, the Triad Stage, and Milwaukee Repertory. She played Bella opposite Judy Kaye in Lost in Yonkers at the Arizona Theatre Company.

== Awards ==
Goehring has received:

- Best Performance: "Bad Mother" Fire Island Film Festival
- Best Performance by An Actor: "Bad Mother", New York Shorts International Film Festival (2023)
- Broadway World/Raleigh Award, Best Actress in a Play: Wit
- Joseph Jefferson Citation Winner: Laughing Wild
- After Dark Award: Laughing Wild
- Joseph Jefferson Award nomination: Candida
- Joseph Jefferson Award nomination: Angels in America
- Carbonell Award/Principal Actress: Angels in America, National Tour
- Leon Rabin Award/Actress in a Leading Role: Experiment with an Airpump
- Chicago Midwest Emmy nomination for Best Supporting Actress: Moment of Rage
- Seattle Footlights Award/Principal Actress: Collected Stories
