= Batter my heart, three-person'd God =

Poem by John Donne

"Holy Sonnet XIV" (1633)

Batter my heart, three-person'd God, for you
As yet but knock, breathe, shine, and seek to mend;
That I may rise and stand, o'erthrow me, and bend
Your force to break, blow, burn, and make me new.
I, like an usurp'd town to another due,
Labor to admit you, but oh, to no end;
Reason, your viceroy in me, me should defend,
But is captiv'd, and proves weak or untrue.
Yet dearly I love you, and would be lov'd fain,
But am betroth'd unto your enemy;
Divorce me, untie or break that knot again,
Take me to you, imprison me, for I,
Except you enthrall me, never shall be free,
Nor ever chaste, except you ravish me.

"Holy Sonnet XIV", also known by its incipit as "Batter my heart, three-person'd God", is a poem written by the English poet John Donne (1572–1631). It is a part of a larger series of poems called Holy Sonnets, comprising nineteen poems in total. The poem was printed and published for the first time in Poems in 1633, two years after the author's death. In the 1633 edition the sequence of the poems was different from that found in Herbert Grierson’s edition from 1912; that is why Holy Sonnet XIV features as Holy Sonnet X in older publications. However, the majority of twentieth-century and later editions of Donne's Holy Sonnets are found to prefer and use the order proposed by Grierson and thus include the sonnet as the fourteenth in the cycle.

== Internal division ==
There is no scholarly consensus regarding the structure of Holy Sonnet XIV; different critics refer to particular parts of this poem either as an octave and a sestet (following the style of the Petrarchan sonnet, with a prominent example being Robert H. Ray's argument), three quatrains and a couplet (the division established by the English sonnet, an example being an article by Purificación Ribes), or decide to avoid definite pronouncements on this issue by referring to line numbers only (seen in James Winny’s A Preface to Donne). This supposed difficulty has been circumvented here, with critics dividing the poem as they see fit in their readings, although there are instances where the style of this poem is addressed directly (especially when it comes to the imagery of the poem).

William Zunder takes into consideration the entirety of the work of Holy Sonnets, stating that Donne "combines the Italian with the English sonnet form, to attain the possibility of a resolution of sentiment in the English sonnet final rhyme." S. L. Bethell suggests that this poem is not restrained by any rules or style, as it is a combination of both intellect and emotion that results in a reflection "of the mind,” and harsh rhythms and words like "break" or "force" "do what they say," which would be breaking the rules of the standardly written poems by using a "concrete and immediate" language, and forcing the form to change into an imitation of "the speech of impassioned thought."

== Imagery ==
There are two main sets of images in Holy Sonnet XIV, one associated with military warfare and the other with matters of love and marriage. Accordingly, critics (such as Ribes, Beaston, Gosse, Shawcross, Ray) have identified two discourses in the text – one military (martial) and the other amorous (marital). When compared, both discourses seem to communicate the same idea: being taken by force by God is the only way to free oneself from Satan’s grasp. Ray explains that "the speaker asks for spiritual conquest by God in metaphorical terms as military and sexual conquest throughout the sonnet." In the words of Edmund Gosse, it is Donne himself that takes the role of the speaker and “conceives himself a helpless, beleaguered city held by a hateful and tyrannic foe” – Satan.

The military discourse is prominent in the octave of the poem, manifested in such expressions as: batter, your force, break, blow, burn, usurp'd town, due, viceroy, defend, captivated. The speaker is like a usurped town during a siege, imprisoned by the enemy (Satan and sin), but is awaiting God to use his force and to liberate him. George Herman notes that this expected role of the "three-person'd God" brings together the poem with the image of a bigger force needed for redemption: Herman proposes that "God the Father needs to break rather than knock at the heart, God the Holy Ghost to blow rather than breathe, and God the Son to burn rather than shine on the 'heart-town-woman.'"

The amorous discourse surfaces heavily in the sestet of the poem, asserted by words and phrases such as: dearly I love you, loved, bethroth'd, divorce me, untie or break that knot, enthrall me, chaste, ravish. The speaker here talks about himself as betrothed to God's enemy. Shawcross claims that, unlike the octave begging "for the mind" and "for the heart to be freed of sin," the sestet "involves both of the preceding by pleading for the body to be freed."

== Themes ==
The overall imagery in the poem is strongly violent and sexual, but also bears clear traces of estrangement from God. The speaker craves to be violated by God not only because the speaker loves him and wants to be close to him, but also to be saved from sin and Satan, which is communicated in physical terms. The poem itself is a plea addressed directly to God, who is invoked in his Trinitarian form ("three-person'd God"). The speaker does not suffer from an internal problem here, unlike in a number of Donne's other Holy Sonnets (such as I am a little world made cunningly or O, to vex me); he is sure of what he needs and how to reach his end goal. However, he cannot easily have exactly what he wants as it requires God's intervention. This can be further indicated by the desperate tone of the poem and the fact that "God's silence is most striking" here.

=== Lines one through four ===
In the first four lines of the poem, the speaker voices his need of being violated and forcefully remade by God, in order to get the promised salvation; his soul cannot be repaired, and it must be destroyed completely. This process of conversion is often associated with the Calvinist doctrine of Total Depravity; in the words of the Cambridge theologian William Perkins: "he that will beleeve in Christ must be annihilated, that is he must be bruised and battered to a flat nothing..." The act of suffering to gain life after death is typical for Calvinists, especially Puritans. This religious group was known for their extreme doctrines regarding subjecting oneself to God, one of them being a process called "humiliation" which included a masochistic and self destructive belief that "[t]he will had to be crushed before it would be, or while it was being, taken over by God." In the first quatrain, there is an aura of expectation present, disclosed by phrases "as yet" and "That I may rise," that adds to the progression and longed for continuity of "past, present and future actions." Bellette notices that "[t]here is also a similar logical order in the placing of parallel [subordinating] elements within the strong government of 'for' and 'that.'"

=== Lines five through eight ===
In the next four lines, the speaker compares himself to a seized ("usurp'd") town that fails to let God in, and tries to communicate "that he himself is trying to admit God back (…) but 'to no end' (i.e., he is not able to accomplish the task)." The desperate tone is strengthened by the sad "O". The faculty of Reason, personified as God's "viceroy" that rules inside the speaker-town, is a gift from God that was supposed to protect the speaker from Satan and temptation but fails to do so, as it is described to "prove weak or untrue." The wording of the poem suggests that Reason is less powerful than sin, which is why the latter imprisoned Reason and claimed it was traitorous. Ray takes into consideration Donne's other Christian works and comes to the conclusion that "the role of faith is quite essential to ward off sin" because "reason alone cannot do it." He highlights the theme of the necessity of God's intervention in a man's life and God's importance in saving people's souls by saying that "God's grace and power are essential."

Bellette contrasts his analysis of the first quatrain with noting the breakdown of the previously described logical order in this quatrain, saying that "the sense of no purpose" is evident in the disproving phrase "but O, to no end." He argues that the monotone “but” is the most prominent element here and forms "the tone of the second half of the poem, in which forward progression is repeatedly checked by the 'yet,' 'but,' 'except' sequence which seems to make every thought double back on itself," and to surround closely the speaker – as well as the reader – with a constantly tightening barrier.

=== Lines nine and ten ===
In lines 9 and 10, the speaker expresses how much he loves God and wants to be loved back but is "wedded" to the enemy; here, Satan. Ray acknowledges that there is a shift in the "emphasis to another conceit or motif" and that the speaker starts seeing and addressing God in a more intimate tone, expressing the "wish to be reconquered by Him in terms of love, sexuality, and marriage", and positioning himself in the passive, feminine mode. The belief that the soul is feminine was common in Christian culture, as pointed out by Ray. In his article, he sees this metaphor at work in Holy Sonnet XIV, and he describes this "feminine soul" in the sonnet as "feel[ing] that she has been forced into a marriage with the conqueror and usurper Satan (i.e., sin)," further observing that the speaker himself states in the poem that he is "betroth'd unto your enemy." The absence of any expression of submissiveness or prayer is noticeable, which goes against what is often expected in more traditional poems of devotion dealing with this subject. From the line "Yet dearly I love you, and would be lov'd fain" up until "Nor ever chaste, except you ravish me", the usual attempt of carrying a sonnet to its resolution by a sequential argument collapses, which is a result of "syntactic units becom[ing] smaller and increasingly antithetical, ending in the hopeless oppositions of 'except' and 'never'" in the final lines. Bellette, who describes this process of argumentative dissolution, notices that it resembles what is happening in another Holy Sonnet, "As due by many titles I resign".

=== Lines eleven through fourteen ===
In the last four lines, the speaker wants God to divorce him from Satan ("untie, or break that knot"), and take him prisoner. Just as in the first four lines of the poem, an instance of the Calvinist conversion theme can be observed here. This motif has been noted by Stachniewski, who observed that the "Calvinist conversion involved God's simultaneous and irresistible seizure of all the faculties." Accordingly, the speaker’s situation can only be resolved by the divine rape.

=== Military and amorous interpretations ===
The speaker uses two paradoxical descriptions to characterize his relationship with God: being enthralled but still free, and being ravished but still chaste. It has been argued that both statements are applicable to both the military and the amorous interpretation. Ribes, who makes this argument, suggests that in the military interpretation, the only solution for a town to be free is to enthrall it, which in this case would mean physically bringing it into bondage. Following this example, the amorous interpretation further supports the idea of the speaker using the point of view of a woman, who can be free only if God enthralls her, which would here mean enslaving her emotionally.

Ribes then states that "[t]he woman can only be chaste if God ravishes her." The double meaning of the verb "to ravish" provides grounds for a twofold interpretation. The earthly and more common meaning of the verb would be "to rape"(OED) or "to carry away by force," and it can be instantly connected to the amorous interpretation, where the relationship between the speaker and God is very physical and sexual. The second meaning, more spiritual and theological, would be "to fill with ecstasy or delight"(OED). According to Stachniewski, the conclusion is that the second meaning of "to ravish" can describe the soul's spiritual seduction, which again establishes the importance of the role of God in salvaging souls.

Like in other Sonnets (such as "Wilt thou love God as he thee" or "As due by many titles I resign"), paradoxes and the use of linguistic contradictions suggest that God and his ways are not simple or easy to explain.

== Musical settings ==
Benjamin Britten set the poem to music for voice and piano as the second of the nine settings which make up his 1945 song cycle The Holy Sonnets of John Donne.

A setting of the poem sung by the character of Robert Oppenheimer marks the climax of the first half of John Adams' 2005 opera Doctor Atomic.

== Naming of Trinity nuclear test ==
The poem is believed to be the origin of the name Trinity given to the first nuclear test in 1945. This is widely believed to have been a tribute to Oppenheimer's mistress Jean Tatlock, who introduced him to Donne's poetry. In 1962, Leslie Groves wrote to J. Robert Oppenheimer about this, Oppenheimer replied:

I did suggest it... Why I chose the name is not clear, but I know what thoughts were in my mind. There is a poem of John Donne, written just before his death, which I know and love. From it a quotation:

As West and East
In all flatt Maps—and I am one—are one,
So death doth touch the Resurrection.

In another, better known devotional poem Donne opens,

Batter my heart, three person'd God.

This naming is referenced in the 2023 Christopher Nolan film Oppenheimer; Groves asks what the test should be named, and Oppenheimer replies "'Batter my heart, three-person'd God.' Trinity".
