= As Due By Many Titles =

"Sonnet II", also known by its opening words as "As Due By Many Titles", is a poem written by John Donne, who is considered to be one of the representatives of the metaphysical poetry in English literature. It was first published in 1633, two years after Donne’s death.

It is included in the Holy Sonnets – a series of poems written by John Donne. According to the currently adopted sequence, the poem comes second in the order. It has also appeared in all of the proposed sequences so far - changes in positioning were, however, minimal, as the poem has remained in the first or second position ever since publication.

"As Due By Many Titles" is characteristic for its "Calvinist influence in its reversal of the usually attempted move from fear to hope." As it begins misleadingly with a description of the speaker’s devotion to God in the octave, there is no clue that could prepare the reader for the rest of the poem, where the position of the speaker changes. There, he no longer praises God’s actions with passive acceptance. Instead, he begins to tremble in fear. The devil comes to the fore, and despite everything God has done in favour of mankind, the speaker is not really sure whether he will gain eternal salvation. God might "exert himself to beat off the devil, but whether He does so will depend on His free, unobligated choice." Such a vision is due to the concept of Predestination – according to it, one cannot interfere with fate. Although it lies in the future in the case of the speaker of the sonnet, the choice has been already made, and there is nothing to be done against it. Thus, the doctrinal basis of the poem has been described as Lutheran and Calvinist.

== Structure of the poem ==
As due by many titles I resign
Myself to thee, O God. First I was made
By Thee; and for Thee, and when I was decay'd
Thy blood bought that, the which before was Thine.
I am Thy son, made with Thyself to shine,
Thy servant, whose pains Thou hast still repaid,
Thy sheep, Thine image, and—till I betray'd
Myself—a temple of Thy Spirit divine.
Why doth the devil then usurp on me?
Why doth he steal, nay ravish, that's Thy right?
Except Thou rise and for Thine own work fight,
O! I shall soon despair, when I shall see
That Thou lovest mankind well, yet wilt not choose me,
And Satan hates me, yet is loth to lose me.

In comparison with many of Donne’s Holy Sonnets, the structure of this poem is completely reversed. The usual "despairing tone" of the octave is here moved to the sestet. Instead of developing "the problems of fallenness and estrangement" in the octave and allowing them to be resolved at the end, the poem "reverses this process and concludes by refuting what it initially seeks to affirm."

There is a common interpretation for this reversal. In the 1633 print edition of Donne’s poems, "As Due By Many Titles" was placed first, opening the main cycle of twelve sonnets. The octave here is "less dramatic" than the sestet, which would be "appropriate for the first poem of a meditative sequence that begins traditionally with an opening prayer." Thus, the sonnet was described as "a preparatory prayer before making a meditation."

The structure of the poem was also called "organic," as "every part depends on, and reacts on the other parts." Through "a series of parallel phrases governed by strongly placed subordinating elements (initial as, when, till, and the carefully qualifying and placing which and whose)," the first two quatrains connect with each other, which produces the effect of "order and proper relationship." However, as the typical sequence was reversed, the logical purpose of the octave "is destroyed" in the rest of the poem by the "unsatisfying paradoxes" of the closing couplet.

=== Language and style ===
The octave has a "relatively moderate, logical tone and feeling," whereas in the sestet the speaker is "more emotional," being "indignant at Satan but also at God." The speaker begins with enumerating his titles (his "legal rights or entitlements" towards God), calling himself a "son,"(5) "servant,"(6) "sheep,"(7) "image"(7) and "temple"(8) of God, and these signify "both God’s lawful possession of the creature and the status of the creature." By using the insistent repetition of pronouns of the first and second person (especially possessives), the speaker attempts to create a "permanent and inevitable bond" with God. However, he confronts these titles afterwards in the sestet with the fact that the devil "usurps" him (that is, "unjustly claims possessions" of the speaker), expecting God to act for his individual sake. This highlights a "highly formal relationship between [him], God and the devil, under a dominant legal metaphor, employing the ideas of landed property and usurpation."

=== Prosody ===
The accentuation in this sonnet is said to violate poetic principles. In the sixth line, "the language had to be deformed in order to fit the line into a pentameter pattern." The fact that Donne often violates the poetic form might be due to his "relative unawareness of the nature and importance of sound." It may also be observed, that the lines in the final couplet are hendecasyllabic (that is, there are eleven syllables in a line); "[t]he addition of me to the end of each line breaks the meter and spoils the rhyme." However, there is a possible explanation for that – two of the enjambments in the poem (in its beginning and in the middle) "are also completed by the same word: I resign/Myself (1 and 2) and I betrayed/Myself," (7 and 8) and thus they both have corresponding elements in the other part of the poem.

== Analysis and interpretation ==
=== Themes ===
It is noted that the theme of abandonment by God is scarcely expressed in the Holy Sonnets. It never becomes a central theme, with the exception of "As Due By Many Titles." The main concern of this sonnet is "the problem of election." The speaker sets forth a variety of titles, which suggest that he tries to appeal to God through "conventional submission" (giving a "facile and general" catalogue of sins and debts). However, in the sestet which follows, the speaker realizes that Satan has gained control instead. The speaker begins to fear that he might not be one of the elect. Although "he belongs to God by right," he still feels that "God has abandoned him and only the Devil seeks him." The divine presence is distant and unfelt.

The sestet of the poem "implies a state of warfare between God and Satan." The speaker there becomes "more emotional," being "indignant" at both sides respectively – Satan for having "the audacity to usurp [him]," and God for refusing to act on his behalf. Being tortured by the fear that his fate is contingent upon God’s whims, and that he may not have a place in the divinely ordered scheme, the speaker in the closing lines despairs and blames God, putting "all the responsibility on [Him]." Thus, lines 12-13 can be considered "theologically controversial," as the speaker "threatens God with his indifference to him." The poem seems to end "not on a note of confidence even in the possibility of God’s gift of grace, but in sure knowledge of the perverse possessiveness of the Devil."

=== The speaker ===
As Due By Many Titles presents "a religious self who oscillates uneasily between coherence and incoherence." The speaker feels helpless against the conflict between God and the Devil. Even though he is responsible for his own sins, it does not mean that he is responsible for his salvation. This expresses a Calvinist sense of human depravity – the irresistible power of God’s grace cannot be earned or merited. "Whether the speaker is claiming salvation on the basis of an achieved condition or throwing himself on God’s mercy" is not certain, and the same tension may be also found in other Holy Sonnets.

In the context of the development of the poem, it has been noted that the speaker’s role "moves from passive acceptance and praise of God’s actions for all mankind to active, desperate appeal for God to act again in his own, individual behalf." In the octave, the first four lines function as a "remembering of the salvation history," and the second part of the octave which follows "shift[s] to the present tense to describe in Biblical terms the speaker’s understanding of his relationship with God." In general, the octave "speaks not just for the individual persona, but also generally and symbolically for all mankind," whereas the speaker of the sestet is more personal, becoming a despaired individual who fears that "God’s reconciliation with mankind may not include him." Due to this ambiguity, the speaker remains caught between two different temporalities. It disables him from "constructing a clear, future-tense narrative of his own salvation – or, significantly, of his damnation."

== Connections with other sonnets ==
- "Thou Hast Made Me," (Sonnet I), as well as "As Due By Many Titles," both prevent the readers or the speaker from "making an easy division between decree and experience." The speaker’s temporal experience is strictly connected to the eternal capabilities of God. Due to an unresolved ambiguity, the speaker "seems not to know whether to ask about the decree or the process."
- A major part of the sonnet that precedes "As Due By Many Titles," namely "Thou Hast Made Me," expands upon themes of death and damnation as well as sin and redemption. It reveals the speaker’s "consciousness of sin, his susceptibility to Satan’s temptations, his terror at the thought of damnation, and his prayerful petition for God’s mercy through Christ."
- A similar emotion of anxiety arising from the fear of being rejected by God is also present in "O, My Black Soul" (Sonnet IV). This feeling emerges from the speaker’s fear that God may not choose him, leaving him vulnerable to the clutches of Satan, to remain reprobate for eternity. In the case of the fourth sonnet, the speaker recognizes his own sinfulness and yearns for the grace that only God is able to give.
- The sonnet appears to be a plea to be possessed fully by God, but in fact, it is rather a "desperate attempt" to leave a mark of the speaker’s presence visible for the Maker. The same desperation has also been noted in "If Faithful Souls." (Sonnet VIII)
- The first two lines of the poem "Spit In My face" (Sonnet XI) can be considered a "re-signing" (the rewriting and resigning) of the speaker’s intentions towards God, which he announced already in "As Due By Many Titles."
- Both "As Due By Many Titles" and "Batter My Heart" (Sonnet XIV) suggest that "sin is something that happens to the sinner rather than something he does."
- "Batter My Heart" is said to share similar images of captivity and liberation with "As Due By Many Titles," where the speaker "complains that he has been usurped by the devil and begs for God to rise and […] fight" for his creature.
- "As Due By Many Titles" brings to mind "Batter My Heart," in that "the conviction of ravishment by Satan" in the former underlines the speaker’s request for ravishment by the Trinity in the latter.
- Sonnet II also connects with "Batter My Heart" in terms of structure. Both sonnets reverse the typical movement in which elements opposed in the beginning are resolved at the end.
- Both "As Due By Many Titles" and "Father, Part Of His Double Interest" (Sonnet XVI) use financial and legal terminology to describe the speaker’s relationship with God.

== See also ==
- Metaphysical poets
- John Donne
- Holy Sonnets
- Batter my heart, three-person’d God
