= Wit (play) =

1995 American play written by Margaret Edson

W;t
- 1999 Faber and Faber edition
- Original language: English
- Written by: Margaret Edson
- Characters: Vivian Bearing; Harvey Kelekian; Jason Posner; Susie Monahan; E.M. Ashford; Mr Bearing; Laboratory technicians Dr Bearing's Students

Premiere
- Date: 1995
- Place: South Coast Repertory; Costa Mesa, California

W;t (also written as Wit) is a one-act play written by American playwright Margaret Edson, which won the 1999 Pulitzer Prize for Drama. Edson used her work experience in a hospital as part of the inspiration for her play.

== Productions ==
W;t received its world premiere at South Coast Repertory (SCR), Costa Mesa, California, in 1995. Edson had sent the play to many theatres, with SCR dramaturg Jerry Patch seeing its potential. He gave it to artistic director Martin Benson, who worked with Edson to ready the play for production. It was given a reading at NewSCRipts, and a full production was then scheduled for January 1995.

Long Wharf Theater in New Haven, Connecticut subsequently staged the play in November 1997, with Kathleen Chalfant in the lead role of Vivian Bearing. The play received its first New York City production Off-Broadway in September 1998, at the MCC Theater (MCC), with Chalfant reprising her role as Vivian Bearing and direction by Derek Anson Jones. The play closed on October 4, 1998. An excerpt from the play was published in the New York Times in September 1998. Chalfant received strong praise for her performance. She also incorporated her own life experience into her work on the play, including the final illness and death of her brother Alan Palmer from cancer.

The play moved to the Off-Broadway Union Square Theater in December 1998, after its successful initial run at the MCC. The lighting design for this production was by Michael Chybowski, the set design by Myung Hee Cho, the costume design by Ilona Somogyi, and the sound design and original music were by David Van Tieghem. The production closed on April 9, 2000 after 545 performances.,

The Manhattan Theatre Club presented the Broadway premiere at the Samuel J. Friedman Theatre in a three-month run, starting in January 2012 and closing on March 17, 2012. The production starred Cynthia Nixon and was directed by Lynne Meadow. The set design was by Santo Loquasto, the costume design was by Jennifer von Mayrhauser, the lighting design was by Peter Kaczorowski, and the sound design was by Jill BC Du Boff.

On the cover of the published book of the play, the use of a semicolon in place of the letter i gives W;t as one representation of the play's title. In the context of the play, the semicolon refers to the recurring theme of the use of a semicolon versus a comma in one of John Donne's Holy Sonnets. Both Wit and W;t have been used in various articles on the play for the title.

Elizabeth Klaver has discussed in detail the philosophical issues of "mind vs body" in the context of Wit.

In the fall of 2018, Southwest Baptist University sold pins featuring the quote "Keep pushing the fluids" alongside their production of W;t in order to raise money for ovarian cancer research.

The character E. M. Ashford is based on English literary critic Helen Gardner.

== Synopsis ==
The action of the play takes place during the final hours of Dr. Vivian Bearing, a university professor of English, dying of ovarian cancer. She recalls the initial diagnosis of Stage IV metastatic ovarian cancer from her oncologist, Dr. Harvey Kelekian. Dr. Kelekian then proposes an experimental chemotherapeutic treatment regimen consisting of eight rounds at full dosage. Vivian agrees to the treatment.

Over the course of the play, Vivian reflects on her life through the intricacies of the English language, especially the use of wit in the metaphysical poetry of John Donne. Throughout the play, she recites Donne's Holy Sonnet X, "Death Be Not Proud," while reflecting upon her condition. (In the revised edition of John Donne's Holy Sonnets, "If Poysonous Mineralls" and "Death Be Not Proud" are sonnets IX and X, respectively.) As a professor, she has a reputation for rigorous teaching methods. She has lived her life alone, is unmarried and without children, her parents are deceased, and she has no emergency contact.

Vivian recalls undergoing tests by various medical technicians and being the subject of grand rounds. She remembers sharing a love of language and books with her father. She flashes back to her experiences as a student of Dr. E. M. Ashford, an expert on John Donne. Bearing later finds herself under the care of Dr. Jason Posner, an oncology research fellow who has taken her class on John Donne. At the hospital, she recognizes that doctors are interested in her for her research value and, like her, tend to ignore humanity in favor of knowledge. Gradually, she realizes that she would prefer kindness to intellectualism.

Vivian reaches the end stage in extreme pain as Susie Monahan, a nurse at the medical centre, offers Vivian compassion and discusses with her the option of exercising her final option, "do not resuscitate" (DNR), in case of a severe decline in her condition. Vivian decides to mark the DNR option. Dr. Ashford, in town for her great-grandson's birthday, visits the hospital after learning of Vivian's cancer. She comforts her and offers to read a Donne sonnet, but Vivian, scarcely conscious, declines. Instead, Ashford reads from Margaret Wise Brown's The Runaway Bunny, which she had bought for her great-grandson. Dr. Ashford kisses a sleeping Vivian, quotes Hamlet, and leaves.

While on a routine visit, Jason notices Vivian has stopped breathing and has no pulse. He immediately calls in a "code blue" and begins CPR, despite the DNR order. Susie enters on hearing the code blue announcement, attempts to stop Jason's efforts, and calls to cancel the code. The resuscitation team arrives with a crash cart and attempts to revive Vivian while Susie tries to intervene, repeating that Vivian is DNR. Jason eventually admits his mistake, and upon examining the chart, the team quickly stops. The play ends as Vivian, unclothed after her death, walks from her hospital bed "toward a little light".

== Characters ==
- Vivian Bearing, PhD – 50 years old, a professor of seventeenth-century poetry at the university, diagnosed with stage IV, metastatic ovarian cancer
- Harvey Kelekian, MD – 50 years old, chief of medical oncology at the University Hospital
- Jason Posner, MD – 28 years old, a clinical fellow at the Medical Oncology branch; former student of Dr. Bearing, current student of Dr. Kelekian.
- Susie Monahan, BSN, RN – 28 years old, Dr. Bearing's primary nurse
- Dr E M Ashford, PhD – 80 years old, professor emerita of English literature; Vivian's former college professor
- Mr. Bearing, Vivian's father
- Assorted lab technicians and students

Role	Off-Broadway Premiere Cast, September 17, 1998 New York City, MCC Theater, Chelsea
Vivian Bearing, PhD	Kathleen Chalfant
Harvey Kelekian, MD	Walter Charles
Dr. Jason Posner	Alec Phoenix
Susie Monahan	Paula Pizzi
E. M. Ashford	Helen Stenborg
Laboratory technicians and students	Brian J. Carter, Daniel Sarnelli, Alli Steinberg, Lisa Tharps
Mr. Bearing	Walter Charles

== Awards ==
Wit won the 1999 Pulitzer Prize for Drama. The play also received the "Best New Play" award for 1999 from the New York Drama Critics' Circle. Because the play did not receive a production at a Broadway theatre, Wit was not eligible for the Tony Awards at that time. Chalfant received an Obie award from the Village Voice for her performance.

The 2012 Broadway production was nominated for the Tony Award, Best Revival of a Play, and Best Performance by an Actress in a Leading Role in a Play (Cynthia Nixon).

== Criticism ==
According to Jacqueline Vanhoutte’s article “Cancer and the Common Woman in Margaret Edson’s W;t”, this play is a dangerous representation of cancer treatment, with the stereotypical characters of a medical drama. She criticizes the play for discouraging audiences who really have cancer from accepting treatment. Another point she refers to in the play is the opposing ideas of being kind vs. being knowledgeable. Vanhoutte believes that, in reality, these two characteristics should be able to combine with each other in order for someone to perform as an excellent doctor.

== Adaptations ==
In 2001, the play was adapted into an Emmy Award-winning cable television film, directed by Mike Nichols with Emma Thompson as Vivian Bearing.
