= J. S. P. Tatlock =

American scholar

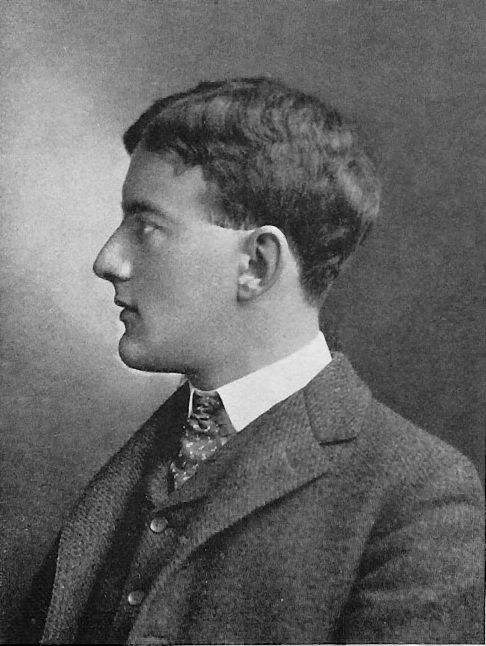
- Tatlock c. 1906
- Born: John Strong Perry Tatlock; February 24, 1876; Stamford, Connecticut, U.S.
- Died: June 24, 1948 (aged 72); Northampton, Massachusetts, U.S.
- Education: Harvard University
- Known for: Scholar of medieval literature
- Spouses: Marjorie Fenton (m. 1911; died 1937) Elizabeth Goodrich (m. 1939)
- Children: 2 (incl. Jean Tatlock)

John Strong Perry Tatlock (February 24, 1876 – June 24, 1948), known as J. S. P. Tatlock, was an American literary scholar and medievalist.

== Biography ==
Tatlock was born in Stamford, Connecticut, in February 1876, the son of Florence (Perry) and The Rev. William Tatlock. He attended Harvard University, receiving his Bachelor of Arts in 1896 and his Ph.D. in 1903. He began his academic career at the University of Michigan (1897-1916). He later joined the faculties of Stanford University (1915-1925), Harvard (1925-1929), and the University of California, Berkeley (1929-1946). He specialized in the literature of medieval Britain, focusing especially on the works of Geoffrey Chaucer and Geoffrey of Monmouth. His works include The Development and Chronology of Chaucer's Works, The Modern Reader's Chaucer, The Siege of Troy in Elizabethan Literature, and A Concordance to the Complete Works of Geoffrey Chaucer and to the Romaunt of the Rose. The book for which he is chiefly remembered is his posthumously published study of Geoffrey of Monmouth, The Legendary History of Britain.

Tatlock was elected to the American Philosophical Society in 1937 and the American Academy of Arts and Sciences in 1939.

== Family ==
Tatlock married Marjorie Fenton in 1911, and they remained together until her death in 1937. The pair had two children: a son, Hugh (1912–2005), and a daughter, Jean (1914–1944). Jean became a psychiatrist, writer, and a member of the American Communist Party, and she was known for her romantic relationship with Manhattan Project leader J. Robert Oppenheimer in the 1930s. After Marjorie's death, Tatlock married Elizabeth Goodrich Whitney in 1939, and they remained married until his death at age 72 in 1948.
