= Holy Sonnet IX =

Sonner written by John Donne

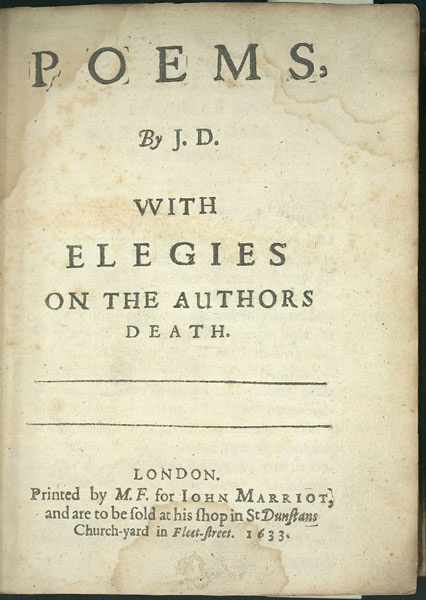
Title page of John Donne's 1633 poems.

"Holy Sonnet IX" is a sonnet written by John Donne between 1608 and 1610. The poem was first published two years after Donne’s death in Poems in 1633, where it appeared as "Holy Sonnet V". In the 1635 edition of Poems, the order was changed and the sonnet became "Holy Sonnet IX".

In the sonnet the speaker questions why humanity, endowed with reason and intent, is more punishable than other elements of God’s creation that act without moral responsibility, such as poisonous minerals and malicious animals. He challenges God’s justice, but as the sonnet progresses, he humbly acknowledges his own guilt, realizing that he cannot dispute God’s will. The speaker then pleads for mercy, asking God to forget his sins and cleanse him with Christ’s blood and his own tears, which symbolize the need for divine forgiveness. The sonnet shifts from protest to repentance, highlighting the tension between divine justice and mercy and the speaker’s hope in God's grace for redemption.

== Interpretation ==
The octave of John Donne’s "Holy Sonnet IX" begins with a protest against divine justice, encapsulated in a series of rhetorical questions:

If poisonous minerals, and if that tree
Whose fruit threw death on else immortal us,
If lecherous goats, if serpents envious
Cannot be damn’d, alas, why should I be?

These lines are "clamorous with ill-concealed terror" and dramatize the speaker’s relentless dialogue with God through uneven rhythms and blunt language that emphasise his emotional state. The protest mounts to a climax with the anguished interjection “Alas,” reflecting the speaker’s profound fear and indignation at being subject to judgment while inanimate objects and non-human creatures escape such condemnation. The speaker laments the burden of reason and intent, which makes human sins "more heinous" than those of animals, plants and minerals. This burden underscores the harshness of a Calvinist God, whose justice, though logical, seems overwhelming and inescapable. Peterson notes that the poem critiques hierarchical creation by contrasting human sinfulness with the apparent innocence of lower forms of life. The speaker uses the examples of poisonous minerals, the tree of knowledge, lecherous goats and envious serpents to highlight the disparity between human culpability and the natural world’s immunity from judgment.

This disparity is further explored in the second quatrain:

Why should intent or reason, born in me,
Make sins, else equal, in me more heinous?
And mercy being easy, and glorious
To God, in his stern wrath why threatens he?

Strier interprets these questions as relying on what he characterizes as “transparently sophistical” reasoning, arguing that Donne composes his lines to draw attention to the most questionable aspects of his argument. According to Strier, Donne presents “intent or reason” as if they were inherent qualities outside the speaker’s control, thereby bending logic to support his claim that his position, compared to other elements of God’s creation, is unfair. By questioning why God’s mercy, which is "easy and glorious," is overshadowed by wrath, the speaker frames divine judgement in a way that downplays the importance of both mercy and justice as essential aspects of God’s nature, relying on logic that, as Strier argues, suppresses an “obvious fact” – that both are fundamental to God’s glory.

Slights emphasizes that the octave reflects humanity’s fallibility and moral responsibility through rhetorical questions that challenge theological doctrines, while Chong highlights how the speaker shifts from collective pronouns (“us”) to the singular (“I”), intensifying the personal nature of his protest. The repeated “if” clauses mimic a rational argument but ultimately underscore the speaker’s emotional distress and sense of injustice. The octave captures the tension between the speaker’s rebellion and his awareness of divine omnipotence. While the questions appear to critique God’s justice, they also highlight the speaker’s vulnerability and the inadequacy of human reasoning to comprehend divine will.

The sestet of "Holy Sonnet IX" marks a shift from the defiant questioning of the octave to a humble submission to God’s mercy:

But who am I, that dare dispute with thee,
O God? Oh, of thine only worthy blood
And my tears, make a heavenly Lethean flood,
And drown in it my sins' black memory.
That thou remember them, some claim as debt;
I think it mercy, if thou wilt forget.

The sestet begins with a rhetorical question that signals the speaker’s realization of his own presumption in the octave, where he had attempted to argue against God’s justice. Strier observes that this marks a turning point: the speaker moves from criticizing God to chastising himself, recognizing the audacity of his earlier arguments. As Strier notes, “Donne turns from talking about God to addressing Him, and his criticism turns against the self.” The question directly references Paul’s rhetorical rebuke in Romans 9:20 – “Nay but O man, who art thou that disputest with God?” According to Chong, this self-chastisement underscores the speaker’s repentance. The speaker appropriates Paul’s words to confront his own sinfulness, marking a critical shift in tone from rebellion to submission.

In his plea for mercy, the speaker imagines a “heavenly Lethean flood” composed of Christ’s blood and his own tears. The reference to the Lethean flood evokes the mythological river of forgetfulness, but it also recalls the biblical flood in Noah’s time, symbolizing both judgment and renewal. The speaker’s guilt is so overwhelming that he appeals to both heavenly and destructive powers to eradicate his sins.

The concluding couplet expresses the speaker’s unique vision of mercy. Strier points out the idiosyncratic nature of this plea, where mercy is defined not as the active forgiveness of sins but as divine forgetfulness. This surprising request reflects the depth of the speaker’s fear of God’s justice, making being forgotten preferable to damnation. In Calvinist terms, this request aligns with the concept of justification, where God no longer remembers the sinner’s transgressions but sees the sinner through Christ’s merit. This theological understanding underscores the speaker’s total reliance on divine grace, signifying his genuine repentance and faith.

The sestet transitions from rational disputation to humble prayer – the speaker, having admitted his guilt and unworthiness, relates to God in gratitude and humility, asking for divine intervention to erase his sins and restore harmony with God.

== Controversy surrounding the final couplet of "Holy Sonnet IX" ==
Helen Gardner suggested that a copyist’s error led to the phrase “remember them no more” being substituted by the more complex “remember them, some claime.” She linked her reading to parallels with Donne’s sermons and scriptural references such as Jeremiah 31:34, where God says, “I will remember their sin no more.” However, this emendation has been criticized for leaving the syntax unclear. John Shawcross interpreted “them” as referring to both sins and the people associated with them, as seen in Psalm 25:7: "Remember not the sins of my youth, nor my transgressions: according to thy mercy remember thou me for thy goodness' sake.”

Stanley Archer built on Shawcross’s reading, proposing a biblical allusion to Romans 4:4-5, where salvation is portrayed as dependent on faith rather than works. Archer paraphrased the couplet as: “That thou remember them for the merit of their works some claim as debt, salvation being their due; I think it merciful if thou wilt forget my works, good and evil.” However, critics such as Susan Linville argued that Archer’s interpretation strayed from the poem’s text, introducing external theological debates not clearly present in the sonnet.

Linville emphasised that the couplet’s referent, “them,” most likely refers to sins, aligning with the poem’s preceding request to erase the memory of sins from both the speaker’s and God’s consciousness. She concluded that the sonnet transitions from prideful reasoning to humble recognition of humanity’s dependence on Christ’s sacrifice for the remission of sins, a move that preserves the poem’s structural and moral coherence without emendation.

== The speaker ==
The speaker in John Donne’s Holy Sonnets embodies a soul wrestling with its salvation, caught between the extremes of faith in God’s mercy and the despair of self-condemnation. The speaker’s identity is not rooted in individuality but in a spiritual state: “lost, guilty, despairing, and presuming, but of good intent.” This abstraction invites readers to identify with the speaker, as the “persona” serves as a rhetorical device rather than a distinct character. The sequence of Holy Sonnets as a whole reflects the struggles and ambiguities of repentance, depicting a life of continual tension and change, where despair is intertwined with faith and conformity.

In "Holy Sonnet IX" ("If poisonous minerals"), the speaker’s self-reflection becomes particularly intense. He not only experiences guilt but also contemplates his own thought processes about guilt, demonstrating a heightened awareness of sin and its implications. The sonnet opens with a series of rhetorical questions challenging the fairness of God’s judgment, which reveal the speaker’s frustration and his attempt to justify himself by comparing his sins to the lesser faults of other beings (minerals, animals, and the tree of knowledge). The speaker’s protest to God culminates in lines 7 and 8: “And mercy being easy, and glorious / To God, in his stern wrath, why threatens he?” This impassioned tone of accusation and anger is tempered in the first line of the sestet, where the speaker turns inward, chastising himself with the question, “But who am I, that dare dispute with thee?”

This moment of self-rebuke marks the recognition that his earlier arguments were not innocent inquiries, but strategies of self-justification directed against God. This turn also reveals the speaker’s realization of his own limitations in questioning God’s authority, signifying a turn from anger to humility. However, the shift does not suggest any certainty that God has been moved by the speaker’s impassioned pleas – the spiritual conflict of the speaker remains unresolved and his appeals are unanswered. In this way, the sonnet exemplifies the broader tension in the Holy Sonnets as representations of the via negativa, where the awareness of God’s evident absence underscores His profound “otherness and mystery.”

== Fear and love in "Holy Sonnet IX" ==
Fear and love are central themes of the whole sequence of John Donne’s Holy Sonnets. These two emotions are integral to Donne’s theological framework, as fear is for him "inchoative love" – the initial stage in the process of repentance, while love is "consummative fear" – the culmination of that process. In one of his sermons, Donne himself elaborates on this connection: "The love of God begins in fear, and the fear of God ends in love; and that love can never end, for God is love." Thus, fear serves as the initial step in the journey toward love, which is the ultimate goal of repentance.

In the sonnet the speaker challenges the concepts of God’s justice and mercy, illustrating the futility of trying to understand divine mysteries through reason alone. Peterson observes that attempting to resolve the paradox of God being both just and merciful is ultimately meaningless, as the penitent must accept God’s will through faith and trust in His mercy. By meditating on God’s absolute justice, the sonnet incites fear in the speaker, which underscores the necessity of complete repentance.

The conclusion of the poem, a plea for grace, marks the shift from sorrow driven by fear to sorrow driven by love, fulfilling the demands of true contrition under Anglican doctrine. Fear alone – defined as attrition – is insufficient for salvation, as only sorrow motivated by a love for God meets the standard of contrition. The transitional nature of "Holy Sonnet IX" reflects this process, as it moves the speaker from fear toward love, preparing him for the next phase of repentance.

== Thematic connection between "Holy Sonnet IX" and "Holy Sonnet XII" ==
John Donne’s "Holy Sonnet IX" ("If poisonous minerals") and "Holy Sonnet XII" ("Why are we by all creatures waited on") are thematically connected, demonstrating a progression in the speaker’s awareness of sin and reason.

In "Holy Sonnet IX," the speaker confronts the concept of sin by questioning why humanity is damned while other elements of divine creation are not. The speaker fallaciously asserts that other creatures also sin, failing to recognize their innocence. Conversely, in "Holy Sonnet XII," the hierarchy of God’s creation is re-evaluated. The speaker acknowledges that animals “have not sinn’d, nor need be timorous,” and yet they still serve disgraceful humanity. This shift in perspective emphasizes the overwhelming weight of human sin, as the speaker now recognizes the purity of the natural world in contrast to his own transgressions.

In terms of how the two sonnets problematize reason, in "Holy Sonnet IX" reason is viewed as “a source of culpability” – the faculty that makes humans accountable for their wrongdoings. However, in "Holy Sonnet XII" reason is no longer seen as a burden but as a divine gift that empowers humanity to govern the natural world. In the latter sonnet, reason is surpassed only by the Atonement as a sign of God’s love, reflecting a deeper understanding of grace.
