= If Faithful Souls =

Poem by John Donne

Holy Sonnet VIII – also known by its opening words as If Faithful Souls Be Alike Glorified – is a poem written by John Donne, an English metaphysical poet. It was first published in 1633, two years after the author's death.

It is included in the "Holy Sonnets," a collection of nineteen poems written by John Donne. "If Faithful Souls" is usually ordered as number 8 in the sequence, as was proposed by Grierson; in the original sentence, the sonnet was numbered as 10.

== "Sonnet VIII" and the initial sequence ==
The poem did not appear in the initial sequence released around 1609, alongside three other sonnets. Derrin suggests that this was due to these four sonnets being limited in terms of the evoked imagery, and not addressing certain matters as "dramatically and forcefully" as the poems that were originally included. Another possible reason is that the speaker in these four poems was much more "abject" than in other sonnets, limiting his possibilities with a comparatively more significant sense of desperation.

== Summary and structure of the poem ==
If faithful souls be alike glorified
As angels, then my father's soul doth see,
And adds this even to full felicity,
That valiantly I hell's wide mouth o'erstride.
But if our minds to these souls be descried
By circumstances, and by signs that be
Apparent in us not immediately,
How shall my mind's white truth by them be tried?
They see idolatrous lovers weep and mourn,
And stile blasphemous conjurers to call
On Jesu's name, and pharisaical
Dissemblers feign devotion. Then turn,
O pensive soul, to God, for He knows best
Thy grief, for He put it into my breast.

The poem begins with the speaker saying that his dead father, who is now "glorified" (line 1) in heaven, sees that his child has successfully avoided hell, which brings the father "felicity" (line 3). The speaker then asks the question of how his mind's "white truth" (line 8) might be seen by the glorified souls, as they may have knowledge of a person's mind on the basis of "signs" (line 6). Afterwards, the speaker proceeds to name types of sinful and fake devotion. In the following apostrophe, the soul is addressed and asked to turn to God; he knows its grief as he is the one to have put it in the speaker's breast.

The speaker uses Petrarchan language. The "Anima Mea tradition" is invoked, that is, an internal dialogue between the speaker and his soul. It starts with the speaker declaring his reliance on God for "knowledge of his own sincerity." It also reveals the psalmic and Augustinian undertones hidden within the speaker's use of Petrarchan language.

There is a volta in the ninth verse, that is, a substantial change of the mood of the sonnet. Here, the focus shifts and is put on a "more limited, impaired, but respectably more traditional Protestant vision of a fallen world," which envisions a God "who curtails communication between sinners and saints and puts grief in human breasts." The final sentence has been noted to signify doubt, signalled by a shift in possessive pronouns: "thy" is used in the apostrophe to the soul, but it changes into a "corporeal self," that is, "my."

== Themes and analysis ==
The Holy Sonnets in general propose that there exist different types of such emotions as grief or love. The general consensus among the critics regarding these notions is that the speaker doubts their nature, as well as himself and his salvation. It has been proposed that in "If faithful souls" the speaker has not yet reached "an appropriate kind and degree of sorrow." He searches for his own kind of sorrow unlike the one represented by "idolatrous lovers" (line 9). It is also noted that the "white truth" (line 8) may be "pure angelic knowledge" describable only by such qualities as the colour; it is possibly possessed by the father, but not by the son, which is what the speaker's "outward actions" imply; they “betray an inner worthlessness within.” The grief present in the final lines of the poem may either be melancholy or sorrow. The speaker emphasizes it to be the latter, which would be "an index of God’s affection." This leads to a paradox, as his grief is a sign of "spiritual crisis"; it should not exist within him, as God “cultivates the care of his soul.” Other critics suggest that the speaker knows and trusts the type of grief that God inserted in him to be true. His "pensive soule" (line 13) is reliant on it and reassures the speaker of his own election. It grants him solace, as he may "offer God real grief and not a mere token or "rote" penance.” According to Ricks, a "positive note is struck" in the final lines of the poem, as the speaker (whom the critic associates with the poet) has found “means of salvation” and God's "arbitrary" mercy could now be acquired with “tears of repentance."

The critics are divided on the topic of the father within this sonnet. The current consensus is that the majority of the critics seem to associate the character with the author's father, John Donne, Senior, a Catholic. It is noted that "If Faithful Souls" "betrays nostalgia, even longing" for the intercession of saints. It is supposed that the "father’s soul" (line 2) represents Donne’s father, whose soul is presented in the first quatrain as the one receiving a "Beatific Vision of God" ("full felicity," line 3) and "contemplating his son’s spiritual fortitude." That is the case if all souls are indeed "glorified" (line 1) regardless of their religious affiliation. Other critics suggest that there is a double meaning present in this fragment, as Donne ponders "whether or not angels know the thoughts of men," questioning if his father reached salvation. As a Catholic in life, he belonged to "misdevotion," which makes the speaker doubt whether his father can judge the validity of his faith and devotion. It has been proposed that this leads the speaker to "valiantly… hell's wide mouth o'erstride" (line 4) in search of "true devotion."

The critics are not unanimous whether this sonnet is predominantly Catholic or Protestant. It is noted that "If Faithful Souls" contains longing for "Roman doctrines" of mediation, which allowed communication between humans and God through "more generous conduits of grace." Gary Kuchar points to the Petrarchan language used by the speaker, proposing that the sonnet "begins to reveal the psalmic and Augustinian subtexts within and behind" it. The poem begins with him "confessing his dependence on God for knowledge of his own sincerity thereby implying at least a cognitive recognition of the renunciation of autonomy necessary to Protestant regeneration." According to Martin, the speaker offers his struggle not to God, but to a "community of saints broader than any single church," an "invisible elite" to which his father belongs despite his Catholic "misdevotion" in life. "Weeping" and "mourning" (line 9) of the idolatrous lovers can be seen as "ritualistic" and therefore fake. As such, they "must be condemned," as were "vile blasphemous Conjurers" (line 10) or "Pharisaicall / Dissemblers" (line 11-12). This would suggest an underlying antiritualist Protestant tone.

== Connections with other sonnets ==
It has been suggested that Donne's Holy Sonnets portray the Christian universe. "If Faithful Souls" incorporates hell into this image. "At the round earths" expands upon it "horizontally," while "Wilt thou love God" adds heaven and God. "If poisonous minerals" and "Why Are We By All Creatures" further expand upon this image, as the two sonnets incorporate the "lower orders" of flora, fauna and minerals. "At The Round Earths" and "If Faithful Souls" also insert all men, "both the quick and the dead," into the world of the Holy Sonnets.

Russel Hillier classifies "If Faithful Souls" as one of the four Holy Sonnets where one may find Donne's "vestigial chronicle." It contains his "sense of loss" of certain elements of the Roman Catholic faith that allowed for mediation between God and humans. "If Faithful Souls" represents Donne's longing for the intercession of the saints. "Since She Whom I Loved" contains a "competition of affection" between the speaker's faith and his wife, who is elevated to the "extraordinary" status of a sacrament. In "Death Be Not Proud," the speaker attempts to turn death into a sacrament granting eternal life "through the death of death." The last sonnet of this group is "Show Me, Dear Christ," which provides the reader with an insight regarding Donne's tolerationism and his relationship with ecumenism, later addressed further in his sermons.

According to Tina Skouen, throughout the first half of the Holy Sonnets different degrees of internal conflict are portrayed. "If Faithful Souls" and "At The Round Earth's" are the two sonnets that seem to portray the speaker at a point where he has not yet reached an "appropriate kind and degree of sorrow."

Gary Kuchar notes that "If Faithful Souls" alludes to "O Might Those Sighes" by asking how one is to recognize another person's state of salvation. The difficulty comes from the outward appearance of "idolatrous lovers" ("If Faithful Souls" line 9) being the same as that of true devotion. The speaker seems to answer this question through the recognition of God as both immanent and transcendent. "O Might Those Sighes" also contains the initiation of the Anima Mea tradition, beginning as a direct "address to the self." This is later elaborated upon in "If Faithful Souls," where the speaker engages in a dialogue with the soul through an apostrophe, beginning the internal dialogue. The dialogue attempts to "unsettle, if not break" the Petrarchan solipsism prevalent in "O Might Those Sighes." The critic also points to "If Faithful Souls," "Since She Whom I Loved" and "What If This Present" being connected through portraying a "distinctly Petrarchan image of the courtly lover." All three sonnets use "Petrarchan vocabulary and topoi" when tackling the theme of one's struggle with their fear of divine judgement, and focus on managing the speaker's "anxiety over his own ontological and soteriological lack of self-sufficiency."

== Bibliography ==
- Chambers, E. K. (1896). Poems of John Donne. Vol. 1. London: Lawrence & Bullen.
- Coles, Kimberly Anne (2018). "The Matter of Belief in John Donne's Holy Sonnets". Renaissance Quarterly. 68 (3): 899–931. doi:10.1086/683855.
- Derrin, Daniel (2013). Rhetoric and the familiar in Francis Bacon and John Donne. Fairleigh Dickinson.
- Doerksen, Daniel W.; Papazian, M. A. (2003). John Donne and the Protestant Reformation.
- Grierson, Herbert J. C. (1912). The Poems of John Donne. Vol. II. Oxford University Press.
- Hillier, Russell M. (2018). "Immediacy in John Donne's Holy Sonnets". English Studies. 99 (8): 854–877. doi:10.1080/0013838X.2018.1516027.
- Kuchar, Gary (2008). "Petrarchism and Repentance in John Donne's Holy Sonnets". Modern Philology. 105 (3): 535–569. doi:10.1086/591260. JSTOR 10.1086/591260.
- Martin, Catherine Gimelli (2013). "Experimental Predestination in Donne's Holy Sonnets: Self-Ministry and the Early Seventeenth-Century "Via Media"". Studies in Philology. 110 (2): 350–381. JSTOR 24392036.
- Ricks, Don M. (1966). "The Westmoreland Manuscript and the Order of Donne's "Holy Sonnets"". Studies in Philology. 63 (2): 187–195. JSTOR 4173529.
- Skouen, Tina (2009). "The Rhetoric of Passion in Donne's Holy Sonnets". Rhetorica: A Journal of the History of Rhetoric. 27 (2): 159–188. doi:10.1525/rh.2009.27.2.159. JSTOR 10.1525/rh.2009.27.2.159.
- Stringer, Gary A.; Parrish, Paul A. (2005). The Variorum Edition of the Poetry of John Donne. Vol. 7, part 1. Bloomington, Indiana: Indiana University Press. ISBN 978-0-253-34701-5.
- Wall Jr., John N. (1976). "Donne's Wit of Redemption: The Drama of Prayer in the "Holy Sonnets"". Studies in Philology. 73 (2): 189–203. JSTOR 4173904.
