= Death Be Not Proud =

Poem by John Donne

Sonnet X. "Death be not proud"
- by John Donne
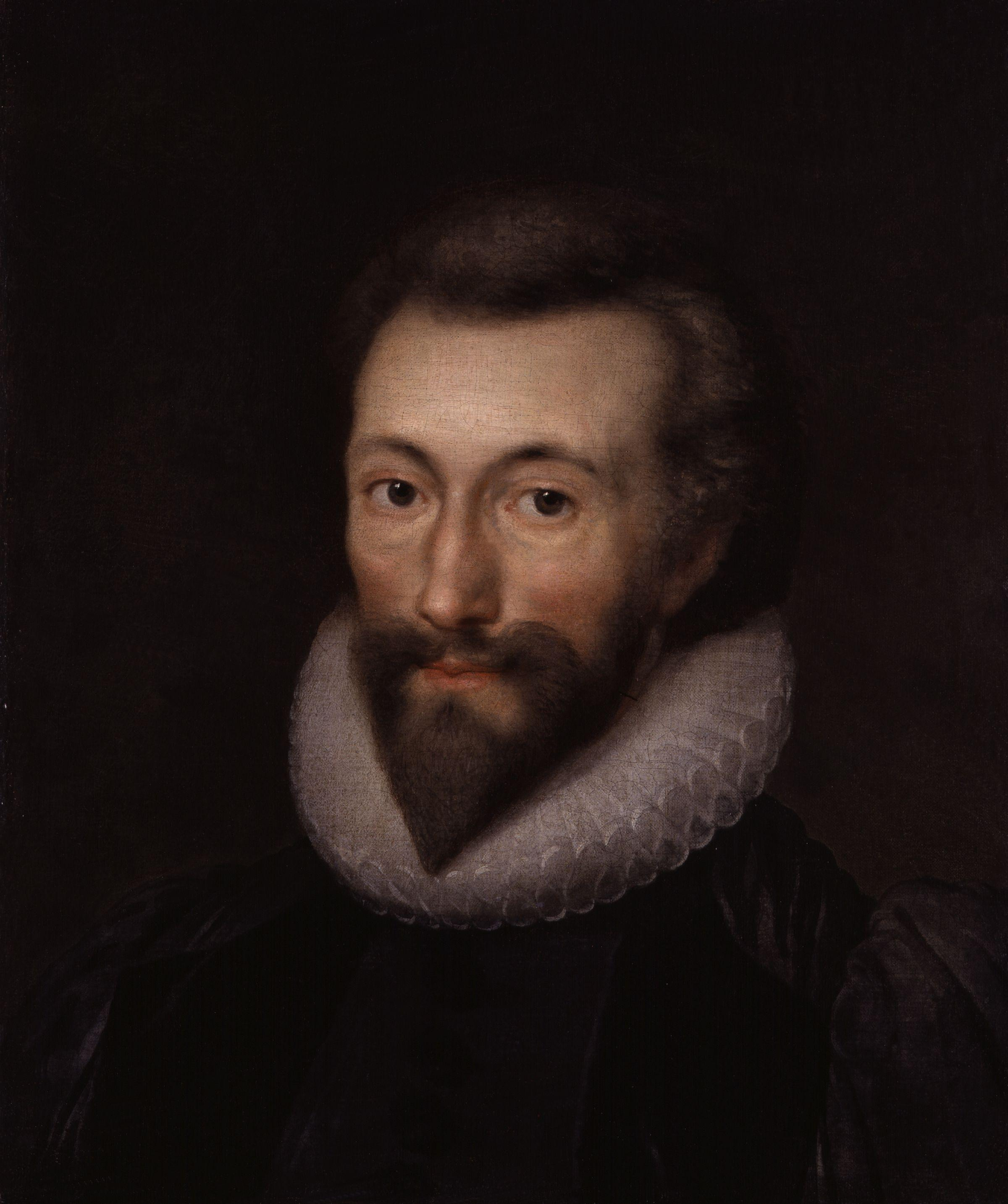
- Portrait of John Donne
- Written: between February and August 1609
- First published in: Songs and Sonnets (1633)
- Country: Kingdom of England
- Series: Holy Sonnets
- Subject(s): Christianity, Mortality, Resurrection, Eternal Life
- Genre(s): religious poetry, devotional poetry
- Form: Sonnet
- Rhyme scheme: ABBA ABBA CDDCEE
- Lines: 14

"Sonnet X", also known by its opening words as "Death Be Not Proud", is a sonnet, or fourteen-line poem, by English poet John Donne (1572–1631), one of the leading figures in the metaphysical poets group of seventeenth-century English literature. Written between February and August 1609, it was first published posthumously in 1633. The poem is included as one of the nineteen sonnets that make up Donne's Holy Sonnets or Divine Meditations, among his best-known works. Most editions number the poem as the tenth in the sonnet sequence, which follows the order of poems in the Westmoreland Manuscript (c. 1620), the most complete arrangement of the cycle, discovered in the late nineteenth century. However, two editions published shortly after Donne's death include the sonnets in a different order, where this poem appears as eleventh in the Songs and Sonnets (published 1633) and sixth in Divine Meditations (published 1635).

"Death Be Not Proud" presents an argument against the power of death. Addressing Death as a person, the speaker warns Death against pride in his power. Such power is merely an illusion, and the end Death thinks it brings to men and women is in fact a rest from world-weariness for its alleged "victims." The poet criticizes Death as a slave to other forces: fate, chance, kings, and desperate men. Death is not in control, for a variety of other powers exercise their volition in taking lives. Even in the rest it brings, Death is inferior to drugs. Finally, the speaker predicts the end of Death itself, stating, "Death, thou shalt die."

== Poem ==
"Holy Sonnet X"

Death be not proud, though some have called thee
Mighty and dreadfull, for, thou art not soe,
For, those, whom thou think'st, thou dost overthrow,
Die not, poore death, nor yet canst thou kill mee.
From rest and sleepe, which but thy pictures be,
Much pleasure, then from thee, much more must flow,
And soonest our best men with thee doe goe,
Rest of their bones, and souls deliverie.
Thou art slave to Fate, Chance, kings, and desperate men,
And dost with poyson, warre, and sicknesse dwell,
And poppie, or charmes can make us sleepe as well,
And better than thy stroake; why swell'st thou then?
One short sleepe past, wee wake eternally,
And death shall be no more; death, thou shalt die.

Donne had a major illness that brought him close to death during his eighth year as an Anglican minister. The illness may have been typhoid fever, but in recent years it has been shown that he may have had a relapsing fever in combination with other illnesses.

The sonnet has an ABBA ABBA CDDC EE rhyme scheme ("eternalLY" is meant to rhyme with "DIE").

The last line alludes to 1 Corinthians 15:26: "The last enemy that shall be destroyed is death".

The poem's opening words are echoed in a contemporary poem, "Death be not proud, thy hand gave not this blow", sometimes attributed to Donne, but more likely by his patron Lucy Harington Russell, Countess of Bedford.

== Influence on other works ==
Death Be Not Proud (1949) by John Gunther, is a memoir of his son's struggle with — and ultimately death from — a brain tumor. In the Pulitzer Prize–winning play Wit by Margaret Edson (and the film adaptation with Emma Thompson), the sonnet plays a central role.

The first two lines of the poem are read aloud at the beginning of the opening title track of Follow the Reaper by Finnish metal band Children of Bodom.

== Sources ==
- Schaper, Arthur. "Poetry Analysis: 'Death Be Not Proud' By John Donne". Classical Poets, 2013. Accessed 24 February 2020.
