= Margaret Edson =

American playwright (born 1961)

Margaret Edson (born July 4, 1961) is an American playwright. She is a recipient of the 1999 Pulitzer Prize for Drama for her play Wit. She has been a public school teacher since 1992.

== Background and education ==
Edson was born in Washington, D.C., the second child of Peter Edson, a newspaper columnist, and Joyce Winifred Edson, a medical social worker. Like the protagonist in Wit, Edson is well acquainted with academia. A graduate of Sidwell Friends School, a Quaker-run private school in Washington, where she had been active in the drama program, Edson enrolled at Smith College in Massachusetts in 1979, earning a degree in Renaissance history in 1983. After graduation, Edson moved to Iowa City, Iowa, where her sister lived, and took a job selling hot dogs during the day and tending bar at night.

She returned to her hometown of Washington, D.C., and acquired a job as unit clerk in the AIDS and cancer treatment wing of a research hospital. Subsequently, she moved to the St. Francis Center (now the Wendt Center for Loss and Healing), where she worked on producing grant proposals. At this point, Edson decided to pursue a doctorate in literature, but first wished to write a play. Edson worked at a bicycle store in Washington and spent the summer of 1991 writing the first draft of Wit.

She enrolled in the graduate program in English at Georgetown University in the fall of 1991. While in graduate school, Edson volunteered in a D.C. elementary school. After she earned her master's degree, she decided to become an elementary school teacher and was admitted to an alternative certification program with the D.C. Public Schools. She taught English as a Second Language and first grade in D.C. Public Schools for six years.

== Wit ==
She sent the text of Wit to sixty theaters across the country.

It was finally accepted in 1995 by the South Coast Repertory (SCR) in Costa Mesa, California. The artistic team at South Coast Repertory worked with Edson to condense her two-act play into one act. The revised Wit was produced at SCR in 1995 and won 1995 Los Angeles Drama Critics Circle Awards for Production, Direction (Martin Benson), Writing, Lead Performance (Megan Cole), Lighting Design (Paulie Jenkins), and the Ted Schmitt Award.

Despite Wit's success at SCR, other theater companies were reluctant to produce the play. In 1997, the young director Derek Anson Jones was chosen by the Long Wharf Theatre in New Haven, Connecticut, to create a new production of the play. Wit opened in November 1997 at the Long Wharf Theatre, directed by Jones and starring Kathleen Chalfant and featuring Walter Charles and Alec Phoenix as her doctors and Paula Pizzi as her nurse. The play earned strong word-of-mouth reviews and won three Connecticut Critics Circle Awards, including best play.

Championed by Kathleen Chalfant, the play was produced by the Off-Broadway Manhattan Class Company in September 1998 at the MCC Theater and then opened at the Union Square Theatre on October 6, 1998 and closed on April 9, 2000 after 545 performances, receiving positive reviews. Still under Jones's direction, the play won awards from the New York Drama Critics' Circle, Drama Desk, Drama League, Dramatists Guild of America and Outer Critics Circle. Edson was presented with the John Gassner and George Oppenheimer playwriting awards, as well as the Pulitzer Prize for Drama.

Judith Light replaced Chalfant in the leading role and the two actress shared the national tour in 2000. Since then, it has received hundreds of productions in dozens of languages.

HBO secured the film rights to the play and engaged Mike Nichols to direct and Emma Thompson to star. Nichols and Thompson collaborated on the screenplay. The production won the Emmy Award for Outstanding Made-for-Television Film in 2001.

The play was published by Farrar, Straus, and Giroux in 1999.

In 2012, the Manhattan Theatre Club produced a revival of the play on Broadway at the Samuel J. Friedman Theare. Lynne Meadow directed and Cynthia Nixon played Professor Bearing. The play was nominated for the 2012 Tony Award, Revival of a Play and Actress in a Play (Nixon.)

There was a 2016 production at the North Carolina Theatre directed by Kate Galvin and starring Kate Goehring, reprising the role of Bearing.

== Personal ==
Edson has continued teaching with no plans to write another play. She teaches 10th Grade Social Studies at Midtown High School in Atlanta. She taught sixth grade social studies at Atlanta's public David T. Howard Middle School and, before Inman Middle School in the Virginia-Highland neighborhood of Atlanta was enfolded into Howard, taught the same grade and subject at Inman. She also taught at John Hope Elementary school in Atlanta, Georgia.

She has given many public lectures including the 2008 commencement address at Smith College.

She lives in Atlanta with her partner, art historian Linda Merrill, and their two sons, Timothy Edson Merrill and Peter Edson Merrill.

== Awards ==
- 1999 Pulitzer Prize for Drama
- 2001 Emmy Award for Outstanding Made for Television Film
