= Jean Tatlock =

American psychiatrist (1914–1944)

- Tatlock c. 1940
- Born: Jean Frances Tatlock; February 21, 1914; Ann Arbor, Michigan, U.S.
- Died: January 4, 1944 (aged 29); San Francisco, California, U.S.
- Cause of death: Suicide
- Education: Vassar College (AB); University of California, Berkeley; Stanford University (MD)
- Occupation: Psychiatrist
- Political party: Communist Party USA
- Parents: John Strong Perry Tatlock; Marjorie Fenton

Jean Frances Tatlock (February 21, 1914 – January 4, 1944) was an American psychiatrist. She was a member of the Communist Party USA and was a reporter and writer for the party's publication Western Worker. She is also known for her romantic relationship with J. Robert Oppenheimer, the director of the Manhattan Project's Los Alamos Laboratory during World War II.

The daughter of John Strong Perry Tatlock, a prominent Old English philologist and an expert on Geoffrey Chaucer, Tatlock was a graduate of Vassar College and the Stanford Medical School, where she studied to become a psychiatrist. As a result of her relationship with Oppenheimer and her membership of the Communist Party, she was placed under surveillance by the FBI and her phone was tapped. Tatlock experienced clinical depression, and died by suicide on January 4, 1944.

== Early life ==
Jean Frances Tatlock was born in Ann Arbor, Michigan, on February 21, 1914, the second child of John Strong Perry Tatlock and Marjorie née Fenton. She had an older brother, Hugh, who became a physician. Her father, who had a PhD from Harvard University, was a noted and acclaimed professor of English at the University of Michigan; an Old English philologist; an expert on Geoffrey Chaucer and English plays, poems, and Elizabethan literature; and author of approximately 60 books on those subjects, including The Complete Poetical Works of Geoffrey Chaucer (1912) and The Mind and Art of Chaucer (1950). He was a professor of English at Stanford from 1915 to 1925, and Harvard from 1925 to 1929, before returning to the Bay Area as a professor of English at the University of California, Berkeley.

Jean Tatlock attended Cambridge Rindge and Latin School in Cambridge, Massachusetts, and Williams College in Berkeley. In 1930, she entered Vassar College. After graduating in 1935, Tatlock returned to Berkeley and took courses to complete the prerequisites for Stanford Medical School, and was a reporter and writer for the Western Worker, the Communist Party of America's organ on the West Coast of the United States.

She was accepted into Stanford Medical School, then located in San Francisco, where she studied to become a psychiatrist. Tatlock graduated from Stanford with the class of 1941. She completed her internship at St. Elizabeths Hospital in Washington, D.C., and residency at the Department of Psychiatry at Mount Zion Hospital, now a campus of the University of California, San Francisco Medical Center, in San Francisco.

== Private life ==
=== Sexuality ===
Tatlock struggled with her sexuality, at one point writing to her friend, May Sarton, that "there was a period when I thought I was homosexual. I still am, in a way, forced to believe it, but really, logically, I am sure that I can't be because of my un-masculinity."

Edith Arnstein Jenkins recalled a conversation with Mason Robertson, a good friend of Tatlock's, in which he claimed Tatlock had told him she was a lesbian. It is plausible that Tatlock had a relationship with Mary Ellen Washburn. As a psychiatrist in training, she was required to undergo psychoanalysis, and therefore consulted Siegfried Bernfeld as part of her training. In the 1940s, homosexuality was seen as a pathological condition to be overcome, which may have led to her eventual suicide.

=== Relationship with Oppenheimer ===
Tatlock began seeing Robert Oppenheimer in 1936, when she was a graduate student at Stanford and Oppenheimer was a professor of physics at Berkeley. They met through his landlady, Mary Ellen Washburn, who was a member of the Communist Party, when Washburn held a fundraiser for communist-backed Spanish Republicans. The couple started dating and reportedly had a passionate relationship. He proposed to her twice, but she refused. Tatlock is credited with introducing Oppenheimer to radical politics during the late 1930s, and to people involved with, or sympathetic to, the Communist Party or related groups, such as Rudy Lambert and Thomas Addis. The couple continued seeing each other after Oppenheimer became involved with Kitty Harrison, whom he married on November 1, 1940. Oppenheimer and Tatlock spent the New Year together in 1941, and once met at the Mark Hopkins Hotel in San Francisco.

While some historians believe that Oppenheimer had an extramarital affair with Tatlock while he was working on the Manhattan Project, others assert that after he was picked to head the Los Alamos Laboratory, he met with Tatlock only once, in mid-June 1943. On June 14, 1943, Oppenheimer was in Berkeley to recruit David Hawkins as an administrative assistant. Oppenheimer and Tatlock went to a Mexican restaurant and spent the night together at her San Francisco apartment. All the while, U.S. Army agents, waiting in the street outside, had them under surveillance. At that meeting she told him that she still loved him and wanted to be with him. He never saw her again.

==== Political involvement ====
During Oppenheimer's 1954 security hearing, his association with Tatlock's friends was used as evidence against him. In a letter to Major General Kenneth D. Nichols, General Manager, United States Atomic Energy Commission, dated March 4, 1954, Oppenheimer described their association as follows:

In the spring of 1936, I had been introduced by friends to Jean Tatlock, the daughter of a noted professor of English at the university; and in the autumn, I began to court her, and we grew close to each other. We were at least twice close enough to marriage to think of ourselves as engaged. Between 1939 and her death in 1944 I saw her very rarely. She told me about her Communist Party memberships; they were on again, off again affairs, and never seemed to provide for her what she was seeking. I do not believe that her interests were really political. She loved this country and its people and its life. She was, as it turned out, a friend of many fellow travelers and Communists, with a number of whom I was later to become acquainted. I should not give the impression that it was wholly because of Jean Tatlock that I made leftwing friends, or felt sympathy for causes which hitherto would have seemed so remote from me, like the Loyalist cause in Spain, and the organization of migratory workers. I have mentioned some of the other contributing causes. I liked the new sense of companionship, and at the time felt that I was coming to be part of the life of my time and country.

== Death ==
Tatlock experienced clinical depression, and was being treated at Mount Zion. At around 1 pm on January 5, 1944, her father arrived at her apartment at 1405 Montgomery Street. When there was no response to his ringing the doorbell, he climbed in through a window. He found her dead, lying on a pile of cushions in the bathroom, with her head submerged in the partly filled bathtub. There was an unsigned suicide note, which read:

I am disgusted with everything... To those who loved me and helped me, all love and courage. I wanted to live and to give and I got paralyzed somehow. I tried like hell to understand and couldn't... I think I would have been a liability all my life—at least I could take away the burden of a paralyzed soul from a fighting world.

Her father found her correspondence and sifted through it, burning letters and photographs in the fireplace. At 5:10 pm he called the Halstead Funeral Home, who contacted the police. The police arrived at 5:30 pm, accompanied by the deputy coroner. At the time of her death she was under surveillance by the FBI, and her phone had been tapped, so one of the first people informed about it was FBI director J. Edgar Hoover, via a teletype link. The news of her death was reported in Bay Area newspapers. Tatlock's father had her remains cremated.

Washburn cabled Charlotte Serber at Los Alamos. As the librarian, Serber had access to the Technical Area and informed her husband, physicist Robert Serber, who then went to inform Oppenheimer. When he reached Oppenheimer's office, he found that Oppenheimer already knew. The security chief at Los Alamos, Captain Peer de Silva, had received the news through the wiretap and Army Intelligence and had broken it to Oppenheimer. Tatlock had introduced Oppenheimer to the poetry of John Donne, and it is widely believed he named the first test of a nuclear weapon "Trinity" in reference to one of Donne's poems, as a tribute to her. In 1962, Leslie Groves wrote to Oppenheimer about the origin of the name, and elicited this reply:

I did suggest it... Why I chose the name is not clear, but I know what thoughts were in my mind. There is a poem of John Donne, written just before his death, which I know and love. From it a quotation:

As West and East
In all flatt Maps—and I am one—are one,
So death doth touch the Resurrection.

In another, better known devotional poem Donne opens,

Batter my heart, three person'd God.

=== Inquest ===
A formal inquest in February 1944 returned a verdict of "suicide, motive unknown". In his report, the coroner found that Tatlock had eaten a full meal shortly before her death. She had taken some barbiturates, but not a fatal dose. Traces of chloral hydrate were found, a drug normally associated with a "Mickey Finn" when combined with alcohol, but there was no alcohol in her blood, despite damage to her pancreas that indicated she was a heavy drinker. As a psychiatrist working in a hospital, she had access to sedatives such as chloral hydrate. The coroner found that she had died at around 4:30 pm on January 4. The cause of death was recorded as "acute edema of the lungs with pulmonary congestion"—drowning in the bathtub. It seems likely that she knelt over the bathtub, took chloral hydrate, and plunged her head into the water.

=== Assassination theory ===
There has been speculation by journalists and historians, as well as Tatlock's brother Hugh, that her death was not a suicide, and the "curious circumstances" surrounding it have subsequently aroused suspicion. The conspiracy theory that she was murdered by intelligence agents working for the Manhattan Project was bolstered by the 1975 Church Committee, which revealed details of assassinations carried out by American intelligence agencies. One doctor quoted in Kai Bird and Martin J. Sherwin's biography of Oppenheimer, American Prometheus, observed that if one "were clever and wanted to kill someone", chloral hydrate would be "the way to do it." However, according to Bird and Sherwin, Tatlock's "unsigned suicide note suggests that she died by her own hand—a 'paralyzed soul'—and this is certainly what Oppenheimer always believed."

The assassination theory has been presented in the drama miniseries Manhattan. It was touched on in the 2023 film Oppenheimer, where the Oppenheimer character imagines Tatlock's death in multiple ways: he sees her lowering her head gradually into the bathtub, but then also sees her with a gloved hand shoving her head beneath the water.

== Portrayals ==
On television, she was portrayed by Kate Harper in the 1980 TV miniseries Oppenheimer and Fiona Dourif in season 2 of Manhattan. On film, she was portrayed by Natasha Richardson in 1989's Fat Man and Little Boy, while Florence Pugh took on the role in 2023's Oppenheimer.
