= John T. Shawcross =

American academic (1924–2011)

- Born: John Thomas Shawcross; February 10, 1924; Arlington, New Jersey, U.S.
- Died: March 8, 2011 (aged 87); Lexington, Kentucky, U.S.
- Known for: Scholarship on John Milton and John Donne, editions of their poetry, and leadership in the Milton Society of America

Academic background
- Education: Montclair State College (B.A., 1948); New York University (M.A., 1950; Ph.D., 1958)
- Thesis: 'Milton's Spelling: Its Biographical and Critical Implications' (1958)

John Thomas Shawcross (February 10, 1924 – March 8, 2011) was an American literary scholar and editor, best known for his work on John Milton and John Donne. A longtime member of the faculty at the University of Kentucky, he produced widely used editions of Milton's and Donne's poetry and several influential monographs on Milton's life, thought, and reception. He served as president and later Honored Scholar of the Milton Society of America, which subsequently created the annual John T. Shawcross Award in his honor.

== Early life and education ==
Shawcross was born in Arlington, New Jersey, the son of Ernest Shawcross and Lillian (Kuncken) Shawcross. He studied at Montclair State College, receiving a B.A. in 1948, and then at New York University, where he earned an M.A. in 1950 and a Ph.D. in 1958. His doctoral dissertation, Milton's Spelling: Its Biographical and Critical Implications, examined the orthography of Milton's manuscripts and early printed texts and became the basis for later work on Miltonic spelling and textual transmission.

== Academic career ==
In the early part of his career, Shawcross taught at Douglass College in New Brunswick, New Jersey, then part of Rutgers University. He subsequently joined Staten Island Community College and remained on the faculty when it became part of the College of Staten Island in the City University of New York; he also taught in the CUNY Graduate Center.

Subsequently, Shawcross moved to the University of Kentucky (in 1979), where he was appointed Distinguished Professor of English, and remained until his retirement in 1994, after which he was named professor emeritus. He taught undergraduate and graduate courses in seventeenth-century literature, supervised numerous dissertations, and was active in departmental administration and national professional organizations.

Shawcross also played a role in major collaborative projects. He served on the advisory group for the Variorum Edition of the Poetry of John Donne and as founding general editor of the series Studies in Renaissance Literature for D. S. Brewer.

== Scholarship ==
Shawcross's work focused primarily on Milton but also extended to Donne, biblical exegesis, and seventeenth-century literary culture more broadly. His early research on Milton's spelling and the chronology of the poems contributed to debates over textual editing and the dating of Milton's early work.

=== Work on Milton ===
Shawcross edited several widely used editions of Milton. He produced scholarly editions of The Complete English Poetry of John Milton (1963) and The Complete Poetry of John Milton (1971), both of which collated manuscript and early printed witnesses and recorded textual variants. His later monograph With Mortal Voice: The Creation of Paradise Lost (1982) reoriented critical attention toward Milton's poetic technique, treating the epic primarily as a literary artifact rather than as a theological treatise.

In Paradise Regain'd: Worthy T'have Not Remain'd So Long Unsung (1988) he argued for the poem's structural and theological coherence and sought to raise its status in Milton's canon. His biography John Milton: The Self and the World (2001) used psychobiographical approaches to reassess Milton's life and writings, with particular attention to gender, politics, and family relationships; the book received the James Holly Hanford Award from the Milton Society of America.

The Arms of the Family: The Significance of John Milton's Relatives and Associates (2004) offered a prosopographical study of Milton's kin and social networks, arguing that his family connections complicate conventional portrayals of him as a straightforwardly radical Puritan. In Rethinking Milton Studies: Time Present and Time Past (2005) he surveyed the development of Milton criticism and urged greater methodological self-consciousness in the field.

His final major monograph, The Development of Milton's Thought: Law, Government, and Religion (2008), traced changes in Milton's political and theological positions across his prose and poetry, challenging the view that Milton's ideas remained essentially fixed.

=== Donne and seventeenth‑century studies ===
Alongside his work on Milton, Shawcross edited The Complete Poetry of John Donne (1968), an edition frequently cited in discussions of Donne's religious poetry. He co‑edited, with Michael Lieb, Achievements of the Left Hand: Essays on the Prose of John Milton (1974), and later co‑edited essay collections such as Milton and the Grounds of Contention (2003).

Shawcross also compiled Milton: The Critical Heritage (1970, 1972), providing annotated selections from eighteenth‑century responses to Milton that have become standard reference works in Milton bibliography.

== Honours and legacy ==
Shawcross served as president of the Milton Society of America in 1974 and was named the Society's Honored Scholar in 1981. He received honorary doctorates from Montclair State College (1975) and St. Bonaventure University (1995).

The Milton Society of America twice awarded him the James Holly Hanford Award for the most distinguished book on Milton, including for John Milton: The Self and the World. After his death, the Society established the John T. Shawcross Award, given annually for distinguished editions, bibliographies, reference works, or chapters on Milton.

University press blurbs and scholarly reviews have described Shawcross as a leading or "preeminent" Miltonist whose work significantly reshaped modern understanding of Milton's life, family networks, and theological development. Obituaries and memorial essays likewise emphasized his role as a generous mentor and teacher to generations of students and younger scholars.

== Selected works ==
=== Monographs ===
- With Mortal Voice: The Creation of Paradise Lost. Lexington: University Press of Kentucky, 1982.
- Paradise Regain'd: Worthy T'have Not Remain'd So Long Unsung. Pittsburgh: Duquesne University Press, 1988.
- John Milton: The Self and the World. Lexington: University Press of Kentucky, 2001.
- The Arms of the Family: The Significance of John Milton's Relatives and Associates. Lexington: University Press of Kentucky, 2004.
- Rethinking Milton Studies: Time Present and Time Past. Newark: University of Delaware Press, 2005.
- The Development of Milton's Thought: Law, Government, and Religion. Pittsburgh: Duquesne University Press, 2008.

=== Edited volumes and editions ===
- The Complete English Poetry of John Milton (excluding His Translations of Psalms 80–88). Ed. John T. Shawcross. New York: New York University Press, 1963.
- The Complete Poetry of John Donne. Ed. John T. Shawcross. New York: New York University Press, 1968.
- The Complete Poetry of John Milton. Ed. John T. Shawcross. New York: Anchor Books, 1971.
- Language and Style in Milton: A Symposium in Honor of the Tercentenary of Paradise Lost. Ed. Ronald D. Emma and John T. Shawcross. New York: Frederick Ungar, 1967.
- Milton: The Critical Heritage. Ed. John T. Shawcross. London: Routledge and Kegan Paul, 1970.
- Milton, 1732–1801: The Critical Heritage. Ed. John T. Shawcross. London: Routledge and Kegan Paul, 1972.
- Achievements of the Left Hand: Essays on the Prose of John Milton. Ed. Michael Lieb and John T. Shawcross. Amherst: University of Massachusetts Press, 1974.
- Milton and the Grounds of Contention. Ed. Mark R. Kelley, Michael Lieb, and John T. Shawcross. Pittsburgh: Duquesne University Press, 2003.
