= Poulett =

Poulett (pronounced /ˈpɔːlɛt/ PAWL-et) is a surname and given name. Notable people with the name include:

== Surname ==
- Anne Poulett (1711–1785), fourth son of John Poulett, 1st Earl Poulett, was a British Member of Parliament
- George Poulett, 8th Earl Poulett (1909–1973), English peer, landowner, and a member of the House of Lord
- John Poulett (disambiguation), multiple people, including:
  - John Poulett, 1st Baron Poulett, (1585–1649), English sailor and politician who sat in the House of Commons
  - John Poulett, 2nd Baron Poulett, (1615–1665), English peer and Member of Parliament
  - John Poulett, 3rd Baron Poulett (c. 1641 – 1679), English peer
  - John Poulett, 1st Earl Poulett (1663–1743), English peer, the son of John Poulett, 3rd Baron Poulett
  - John Poulett, 2nd Earl Poulett (1708–1764), English peer, known as Viscount Hinton from birth until 1743
  - John Poulett, 4th Earl Poulett (1756–1819), English peer and militia officer
  - John Poulett, 5th Earl Poulett (1783–1864), English peer and militia officer
- Vere Poulett (1761–1812), British soldier and politician
- Vere Poulett, 3rd Earl Poulett (1710–1788), English peer
- William Poulett (disambiguation), multiple people, including:
  - William Poulett, 6th Earl Poulett (1827–1899), English peer, landowner, army officer, and racehorse owner
  - William Poulett, 7th Earl Poulett (1883–1918), English peer and British Army officer

== Given name ==
- Poulett Somerset CB (1822–1875), British soldier and politician

== See also ==
- Earl Poulett, title in the Peerage of England
- Poulet
- Poulette (disambiguation)
- Poulett-Harris
