= List of entertainers who married titled Britons =

This is a list of notable singers, dancers and actors who married titled Britons (nobility and royalty).

This list includes only those who contracted marriages.

- Anastasia Robinson and the Earl of Peterborough (1724)
- Lavinia Fenton and the Duke of Bolton (1751)
- Hyacinthe-Gabrielle Roland and the Earl of Mornington (1794)
- Elizabeth Farren and the Earl of Derby (1797) (Note: Farren became mother to Lady Wilton)
- Louisa Brunton and Earl Craven (1807)
- Mary "Polly" Bolton and Lord Thurlow (1813)
- Elizabeth O'Neill and William Wrixon-Becher (1819) (Note: He became first of the Wrixon-Becher baronets)
- Mary Anne Paton and Lord William Lennox (1824)
- Harriet Mellon and the Duke of St Albans (1827) (Note: She had wealth in addition to her other endowments, being the widow of Thomas Coutts)
- Maria Foote and the Earl of Harrington (1831)
- Catherine "Kitty" Stephens and the Earl of Essex (1838)
- Frances Braham and Earl Waldegrave (1840)
- Mrs Nisbett and Sir William Boothby, 8th Baronet (1844)
- Sarah Fairbrother and the Duke of Cambridge (1847) (Note: In contravention of the Royal Marriages Act)
- Julia Fortescue and Baron Gardner (1848)
- Emily Saunders and Sir William Don (1857)
- Harriette Webster and Baron Burnham (1862)
- Anne Sheppey and Viscount Hinton (1869)
- Kate Cooke and the Earl of Euston (1871)
- "Dolly Tester" and the Marquess of Ailesbury (1884)
- Belle Bilton and William Trench, 5th Earl of Clancarty (1889)
- Constance "Connie" Gilchrist and the 7th Earl of Orkney (1892)
- May Yohé and Lord Francis Hope (1894)
- Rosie Boote and the Marquis of Headfort (1901)
- Anna Robinson and the Earl of Rosslyn (1905)
- Denise Orme and Baron Churston (1907)
- Sylvia Storey and the 7th Earl Poulett (1908)
- Ethel Kendall (Note: In 1925 granted the rank of the widow of a viscount by a Royal warrant of precedence) and Hon. Maurice Henry Nelson Hood (1908)
- May Etheridge and the 7th Duke of Leinster (1913)
- José Collins and Lord Robert Edward Innes-Ker (1920)
- Gertie Millar and the 2nd Earl of Dudley (1924)
- Lydia Lopokova and John Maynard Keynes (1925) (later ennobled as Lord Keynes)
- Sylvia Ashley and Lord Ashley (1927)
- June Tripp and Baron Inverclyde (1929)
- Adele Astaire and Lord Charles Cavendish (1932)
- Irma de Malkhazouny and the Duke of Leeds (1933)
- "Mimi" Forde Pigott and the Earl of Suffolk (1934)
- Oriel Ross and the 8th Earl Poulett (1935)
- Virginia Cherrill and Earl of Jersey (1937)
- Sylvia Ashley and Baron Stanley of Alderley (1944)
- Denise Orme and the 7th Duke of Leinster (1946)
- Shirin Berry and Baron Moynihan (1958)
- Maureen Swanson and the 4th Earl of Dudley (1961)
- Jamie Lee Curtis and The Hon. Christopher Guest (1984) (Guest later inherited his father's title of Lord Haden-Guest)
- Tracy-Louise Ward and the Duke of Beaufort (1987)
- Louise Robey and Earl of Burford (1994)
- A. J. Langer and the Earl of Devon (2004)
- Sophie Winkleman and Lord Frederick Windsor (2009)
- Meghan Markle and the Duke of Sussex (2018)
