= John Poulett =

John Poulett may refer to:

- John Poulett, 1st Baron Poulett, (1585–1649), English sailor and politician who sat in the House of Commons
- John Poulett, 2nd Baron Poulett, (1615–1665), English peer and Member of Parliament
- John Poulett, 3rd Baron Poulett (c. 1641–1679), English peer
- John Poulett, 1st Earl Poulett (1663–1743), English peer, the son of John Poulett, 3rd Baron Poulett
- John Poulett, 2nd Earl Poulett (1708–1764), English peer, known as Viscount Hinton from birth until 1743
- John Poulett, 4th Earl Poulett (1756–1819), English peer and militia officer
- John Poulett, 5th Earl Poulett (1783–1864), English peer and militia officer

== See also ==
- John Paulet (disambiguation)
