= Poulet =

Poulet is a French surname, meaning chicken. Notable people with the name include:

- Anne Poulet (born 1942), American art historian
- Gaston Poulet (1892–1974), French violinist and conductor
- Georges Poulet (1902–1991), Belgian literary critic
- J. Poulet (fl. 1811–1818), English cricketer
- Olivia Poulet (born 1978), English actress and screenwriter
- Paul Poulet (1887–1946), Belgian mathematician
- Quentin Poulet (fl. 1477–1506), Burgundian Catholic priest, scribe, illuminator, and librarian
- Robert Poulet (1893–1989), Belgian writer, literary critic and journalist
- William Poulet (publisher), pseudonym used by Jean-Paul Wayenborgh to write his History of Spectacles "Die Brille"
- Auguste Poulet-Malassis (1825–1878), French printer and publisher

== See also ==
- Poulett
- Poulette (disambiguation)
