= William Poulett =

William Poulett may refer to:

- William Poulett, 6th Earl Poulett (1827–1899), English peer, landowner, army officer, and racehorse owner
- William Poulett, 7th Earl Poulett (1883–1918), English peer and British Army officer

== See also ==
- William Paulet (disambiguation)
