= Marie Celeste =

American actress and soprano (1875–1954)

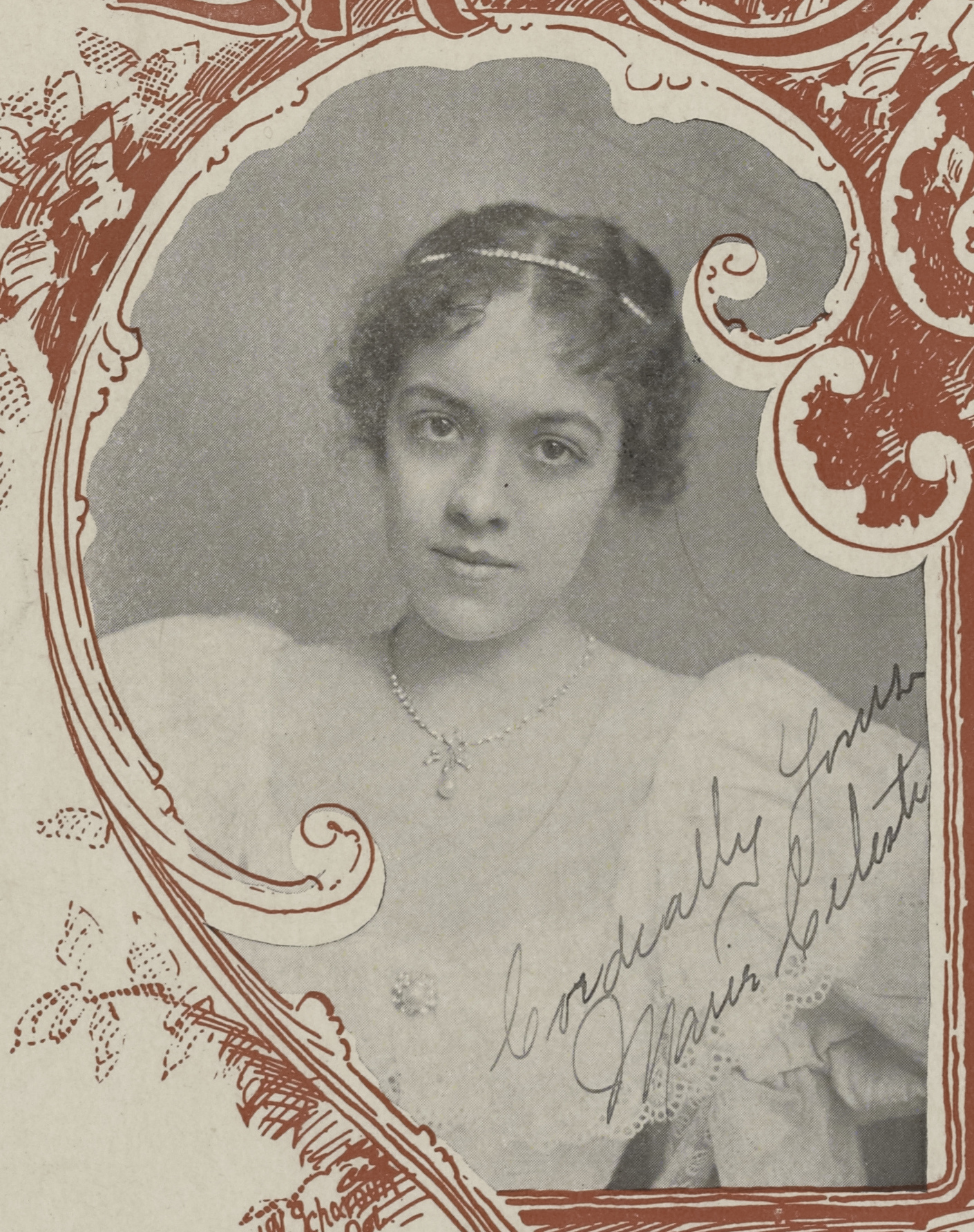
Marie Celeste

Marie Celeste Martin Stranahan, known by her stage name Marie Celeste, (November 6, 1875– December 17, 1954) was an American actress, soprano, socialite, and philanthropist. She was an active performer in light operas and musicals in the 1890s and early 1900s. She starred in the Broadway productions of Princess Nicotine (1893), Mother Goose (1899), A Runaway Girl (1900), and San Toy (1900 and 1902). She retired from performance after marrying Frank D. Stranahan who was a co-founder of the Champion spark plug manufacturing company. She and her husband became well known philanthropists and patrons of the arts in Toledo, Ohio.

== Early life ==
The daughter of Benard C. Martin and Marie C. Martin (née De LaMotle), Marie Celeste Martin was born in New York City on November 6, 1875. She grew up in the city of her birth and was educated in New York.

== Career ==
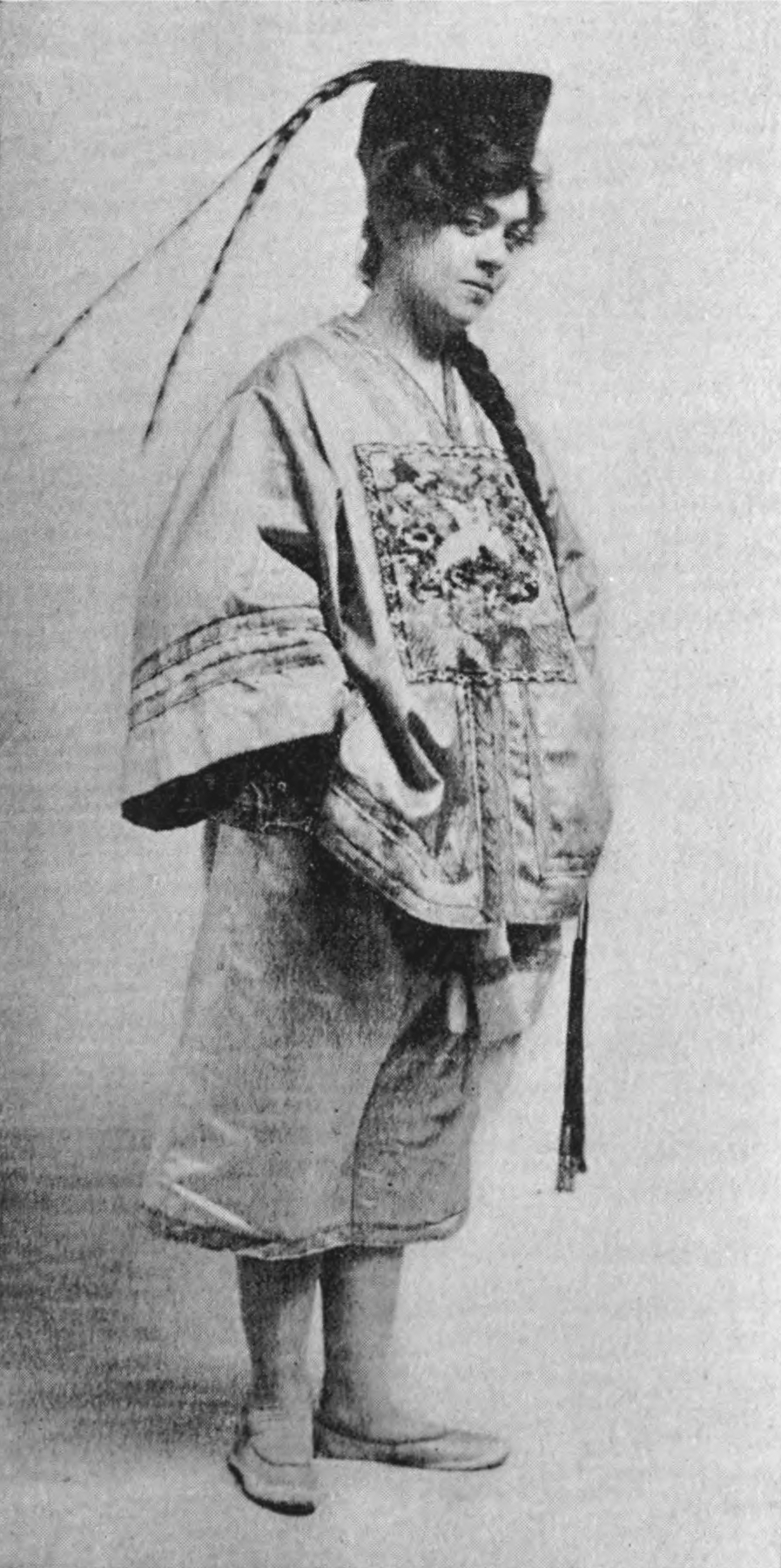
Marie Celeste in the title role of Sidney Jones and Edward Morton's San Toy which she portrayed on Broadway in 1900 and 1902.

Marie Celeste made her stage debut performing with a stock theatre company in Halifax, Nova Scotia in 1890 in the role of the maid Fantile in Ben Teal's The Great Metopolis. The company was led by actor William H. Lytell (1851-1925). She toured with this organization; progressing from smaller parts to leading roles before returning to New York to pursue education for a career in opera. She trained as a soprano at the National Conservatory of Music of America in Manhattan.

In 1892 Marie Celeste portrayed Polly Hoss in the original cast of the farce Hoss and Hoss which starred Charles Reed and William Collier Sr. It began its tour at the Hollis Street Theatre in Boston on January 12, 1892. After this she joined the touring theatre company of Lillian Russell for the 1893-1894 season. Parts she performed with this company included Paquita in Giroflé-Girofla, Wanda in The Grand Duchess of Gerolstein, and Petita in William Furst's Princess Nicotine. She made her Broadway debut in the latter operetta at the Casino Theatre on November 20, 1893.

In the 1894-1895 season, Marie Celeste was a member of Della Fox's theatre troupe in which she performed the role of Octavie in William Furst's The Little Trooper. She returned to Lillian Russell's company for the 1895-1896 season as Duchess Blanche of Parthenay in Le petit duc, Guadalena in La Périchole, and Ninetta in La Tzigane.

In 1896 illness kept Marie Celeste mostly inactive on the stage, and in 1897 she toured as the Queen in Klaw and Erlanger The Brownies. This was followed by performances as Peone Burn in One Round of Pleasure, Mistress Mary in Robert Barnet and Alfred Baldwin Sloane's Jack and the Beanstalk, and Minutezza in John Philip Sousa's The Bride Elect. In 1898 she portrayed several roles at The Boston Theatre; including Phoebe Fairleigh in Billee Taylor and Josephine in H.M.S. Pinafore.

In 1899 she portrayed Bo-Peep in Louis De Lange and Edgar Smith's musical Mother Goose at the Fourteenth Street Theatre in Manhattan. She returned to Broadway in 1900 as Winifred Grey in the revival of A Runaway Girl at Daly's Theatre. She portrayed the title role in both the 1900 and 1902 Broadway productions of Sidney Jones and Edward Morton's San Toy.

Marie Celeste performed only one role from the grand opera repertoire; portraying Santuzza in Cavalleria rusticana with the Castle Square Opera Company in Boston.

== Later life and death ==
In 1899 Marie Celeste met her future husband, Frank D. Stranahan, while performing in Boston. The couple married on June 2, 1902 in Brookline, Massachusetts. Prior to their marriage Frank had worked as the manager of the Tremont House hotel in Boston which his family owned from 1895-1900. Frank and his brother, Robert A. Stranahan, co-founded the Champion spark plug manufacturing company in Boston in 1908. The company moved to Toledo, Ohio in 1910. Their the couple became known for their work as philanthropists; although they chose to predominantly give anonymously.

Marie Celeste was a socialite in Toledo. In 1941 she served a term as president of the Toledo Symphony Orchestra Society (no relation to the present orchestra founded in 2019); an organization that worked to financially sustain Toledo's orchestra. She also served a term as president of Toledo Women's Club in 1940, and was a financial supporter of a lecture series held at Toledo's city hall. Her nephew was the American sportsman Frank Stranahan.

Marie Celeste spent her winters living at a property the Stranaham family owned in Richmond, Virginia known as Windsor Farms. She was an active member of the Woman's Club of Richmond.

Marie Celeste Martin Stranahan died in Toledo, Ohio on December 17, 1954. She died at Toledo Hospital of heart disease.
