= Municipal Buildings, Taunton =

Municipal building in Taunton, Somerset, England

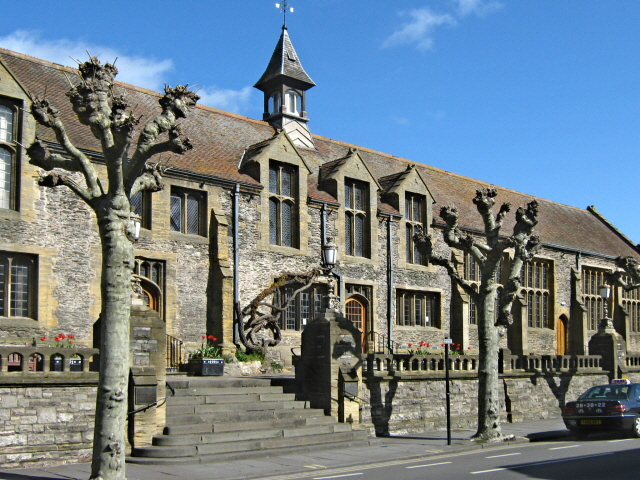
- Municipal Buildings

- Shown in Somerset
- 51.0148°N 3.1044°W
- Location: Corporation Street, Taunton

History
- Built: c. 1480

Site notes
- Architectural style: Tudor style

Listed Building – Grade II*
- Official name: Municipal Building (West End) Municipal Buildings (East End) (incorporating The Old Grammar School)
- Designated: 4 June 1952
- Reference no.: 1060041

The Municipal Buildings are historic buildings in Corporation Street, Taunton, Somerset, England. The buildings, which were the home of Taunton Grammar School before becoming the headquarters of Taunton Borough Council, are Grade II* listed.

== History ==
=== Taunton Grammar School ===
The east end of the current building, which was commissioned as a school, dates back to about 1480. The school was re-formed by the Bishop of Winchester and Lord Privy Seal, Richard Foxe, in 1522. Foxe gave the school an endowment in the shape of a small manor near Chard. In the late 18th century this was producing an income of some £40, enough to pay a schoolmaster but little more. On Foxe's instructions, the mastership of the school was to be in the gift of the Warden of New College, Oxford "for ever".

The school was badly damaged by the Parliamentarian forces commanded by Robert Blake in the Sieges of Taunton between September 1644 and July 1645 during the English Civil War. One of the school's masters, James Upton, was appointed in 1706 at the instigation of Lord Poulett and built the school up to the point of being a leading provincial grammar school, with over two hundred boys.

In 1818, a writer on schools was puzzled to note that although the school had fine buildings, including a school-room "of vast dimensions", it had had "no scholars" for many years. In 1820, The Gentleman's Magazine reported that

The endowed Grammar-school at Taunton, which has been held as a sinecure for the last 25 years, is about to be restored as an efficient Seminary for the children of the townsmen, under the care and management of the assistant preacher of the parish.

The school moved to South Road in 1870, but after getting into financial difficulties, it returned to Corporation Street in 1880, before closing completely in 1885. The newly-completed and abandoned premises in South Road were acquired by Canon Nathaniel Woodard and became King's College, Taunton. Meanwhile, a new girls' grammar school, funded by Bishop Fox's endowment, opened in the former Roman Catholic Church on The Crescent in 1890: this evolved to become known as Bishop Fox's School.

==== Notable old boys ====
Notable old boys included:

- John Enty (c. 1675 – 1743), presbyterian minister
- John Poulett, 2nd Earl Poulett (1708–1764)
- Peregrine Poulett (died 1752), member of parliament for Bridgwater
- Vere Poulett, 3rd Earl Poulett (1710–1788)
- Thomas Wakley (1795–1862), surgeon and social reformer, founder of The Lancet

=== Headquarters of Taunton Borough Council ===
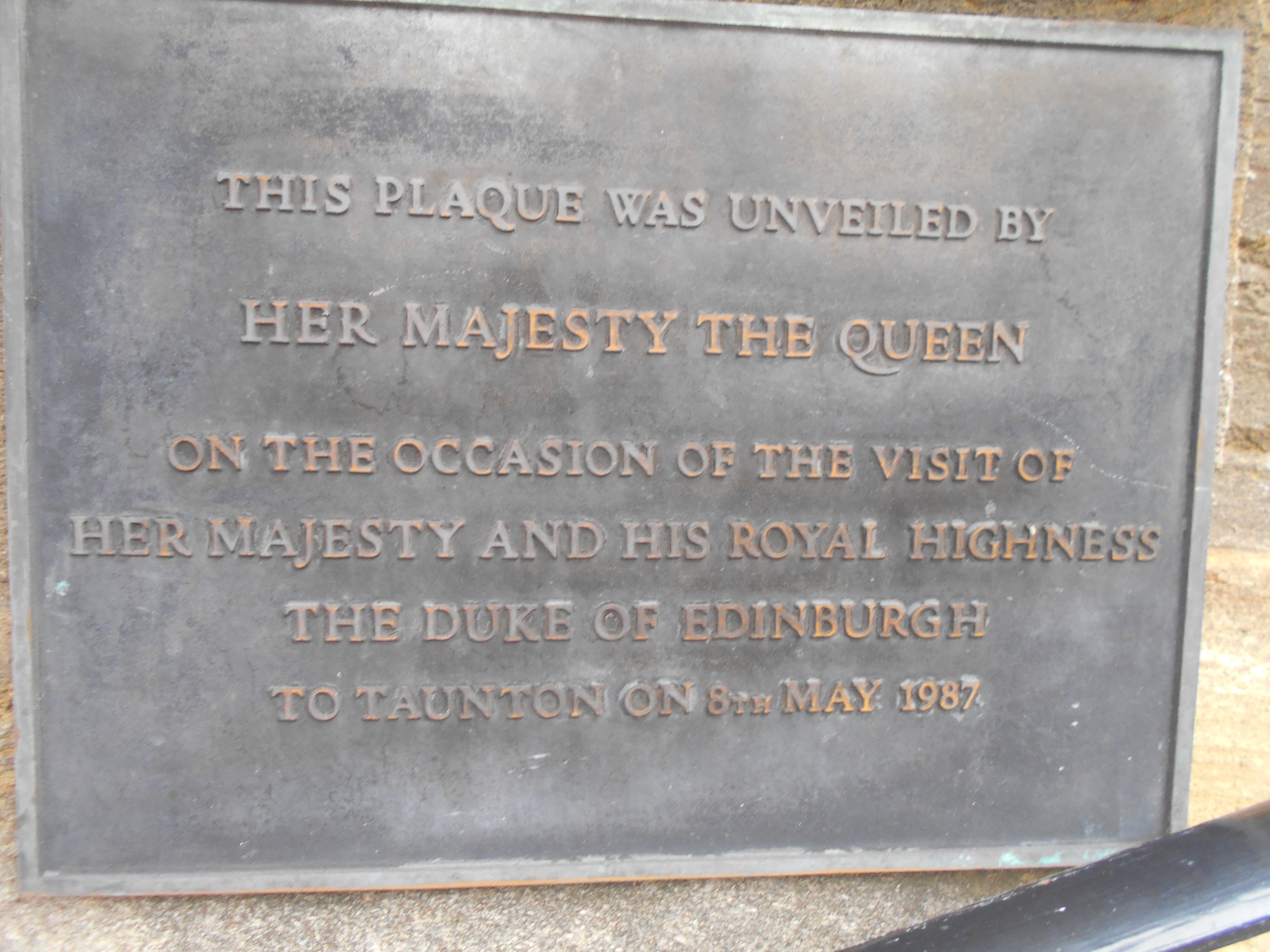
Plaque unveiled by The Queen during her visit on 8 May 1987

After Taunton became a municipal borough in 1877, civic leaders decided to acquire the vacant grammar school building in Corporation Street and to convert it for municipal use in 1887. In order to create extra capacity for council officers, the building was significantly extended to the west in 1904.

The building continued to serve as the headquarters of Taunton Corporation for much of the 20th century and remained the local seat of government when the enlarged Taunton Deane Council was formed in 1974. However, the council eventually moved to modern facilities at Deane House on Belvedere Road in spring 1987. Queen Elizabeth II, accompanied by the Duke of Edinburgh, visited Taunton and saw the work being undertaken to convert the Municipal Buildings for future use on 8 May 1987. The building was re-opened as a voluntary service centre by Princess Margaret on 12 June 1987.

== Architecture ==
The building was designed in the Tudor style and it was built with rubble walls and ashlar stone dressings. The design involves an asymmetrical main frontage of eleven bays facing onto Corporation Street. The eastern section features five-light mullioned windows while the western section features gablets containing two-light mullion windows. There is a bellcote in the centre of the roof. Internally, the main rooms are the council chamber (originally a boys' dormitory), the main hall (originally the schoolroom) and the mayor's parlour.

== See also ==
- Grade II* listed buildings in Taunton Deane
