= William Taylour =

British archaeologist (1904–1989)

Lord William Taylour FSA KCSG
- Born: William Desmond Taylour; 3 January 1904
- Died: 2 December 1989 (aged 85)
- Known for: Excavations at Mycenae

Academic background
- Education: Harrow School; Trinity College, Cambridge
- Thesis: Mycenaean Pottery in Italy and Adjacent Areas (1955)

Academic work
- Discipline: Archaeology
- Sub-discipline: Mycenaean Greek archaeology
- Military career
- Allegiance: United Kingdom
- Branch: British Army
- Rank: Captain
- Unit: 2nd Derbyshire Yeomanry
- Conflicts: Second World War; Western Desert campaign

Lord William Desmond Taylour, FSA, KCSG (3 January 1904 – 2 December 1989) was a British archaeologist, specialising in Mycenaean Greece.

== Biography ==
William Desmond Taylour was the second son of Geoffrey Taylour, 4th Marquess of Headfort, and the Irish Gaiety Girl Rosie Boote. He was born on 3 January 1904, at Pennington House (Note: ASCSA indicates a birth at Headfort House (Ireland) but the DNB mentions Pennington, before moving to Headfort.) (Lymington, Hampshire), where his parents lived after their scandalous wedding, but was raised in the family estate Headfort House, in Meath County, Ireland.

Taylour was educated at Harrow School, an all-boys public school (an independent boarding school) in London. While at Harrow, he was a cadet of its Junior Division of the Officer Training Corps. He was then encouraged to enter a career rather than attend university. After two years in the diplomatic service, he began a career in finance. He first worked on Wall Street, New York, and then in London.

On 2 September 1939, the day before the United Kingdom declared war on Germany, Taylour was commissioned as a second lieutenant in the Royal Armoured Corps, Territorial Army. During the Second World War, he fought in North Africa among the 2nd Derbyshire Yeomanry, where he gained the rank of captain. After the end of the war, he joined the Allied Control Commission in Germany.

In 1947, at the age of 42, he matriculated at Trinity College, Cambridge to study for an archaeology degree. A keen archaeologist since his time at Harrow, among his lecturers were Grahame Clark and Glyn Daniel, both younger than him. He remained at the University of Cambridge to undertake a Doctor of Philosophy (PhD) degree in Mycenaean pottery, which he completed in 1955. His doctoral thesis was published in 1958 as Mycenaean Pottery in Italy and Adjacent Areas. That year, he was also elected Fellow of the Society of Antiquaries of London (FSA).

From 1949 onwards, he took part in numerous excavations in Greece, in particular at Mycenae with Alan Wace, and at Pylos with Carl Blegen. After Wace's death in 1957, Lord William Taylour became director of the British School at Athens excavations at Mycenae, working jointly with Ioánnis Papadimitríou and George Mylonas of the Archaeological Society of Athens. Their work led to an in-depth knowledge of the citadel of Mycenae and the development of the complex of buildings that he described as the cult centre. His 1964 The Mycenaeans, one of the first major studies of the Mycenaean civilisation, quickly became a reference. Between 1959 and 1977, he also excavated the site of Ayios Stephanos in Laconia, a small Bronze Age harbour, demonstrating the commercial links between Minoan Crete and mainland Greece.

In 1981, together with Elizabeth French, he inaugurated the first volume of Well Built Mycenae, a publication that continued until 2012.

== Personal life ==
Taylour was raised a Roman Catholic, the faith of his mother. When in Cambridge, he attended Mass at the chapel of St Edmund's House, then a House of Residence of the university. He was for many years the treasurer of the Cambridge University Catholic Association, and served alongside the Catholic chaplain, Monsignor Alfred Gilbey. Like Gilbey, Taylor was a Traditionalist Catholic. He was honoured by the pope with appointment as Knight Commander of the Order of St Gregory the Great.

Taylor never married. He died on 2 December 1989 at his home in Great Shelford, Cambridgeshire, aged 85. He left a fortune of £983,107.
