= Rosie Boote =

Irish entertainer and aristocrat (1878–1958)

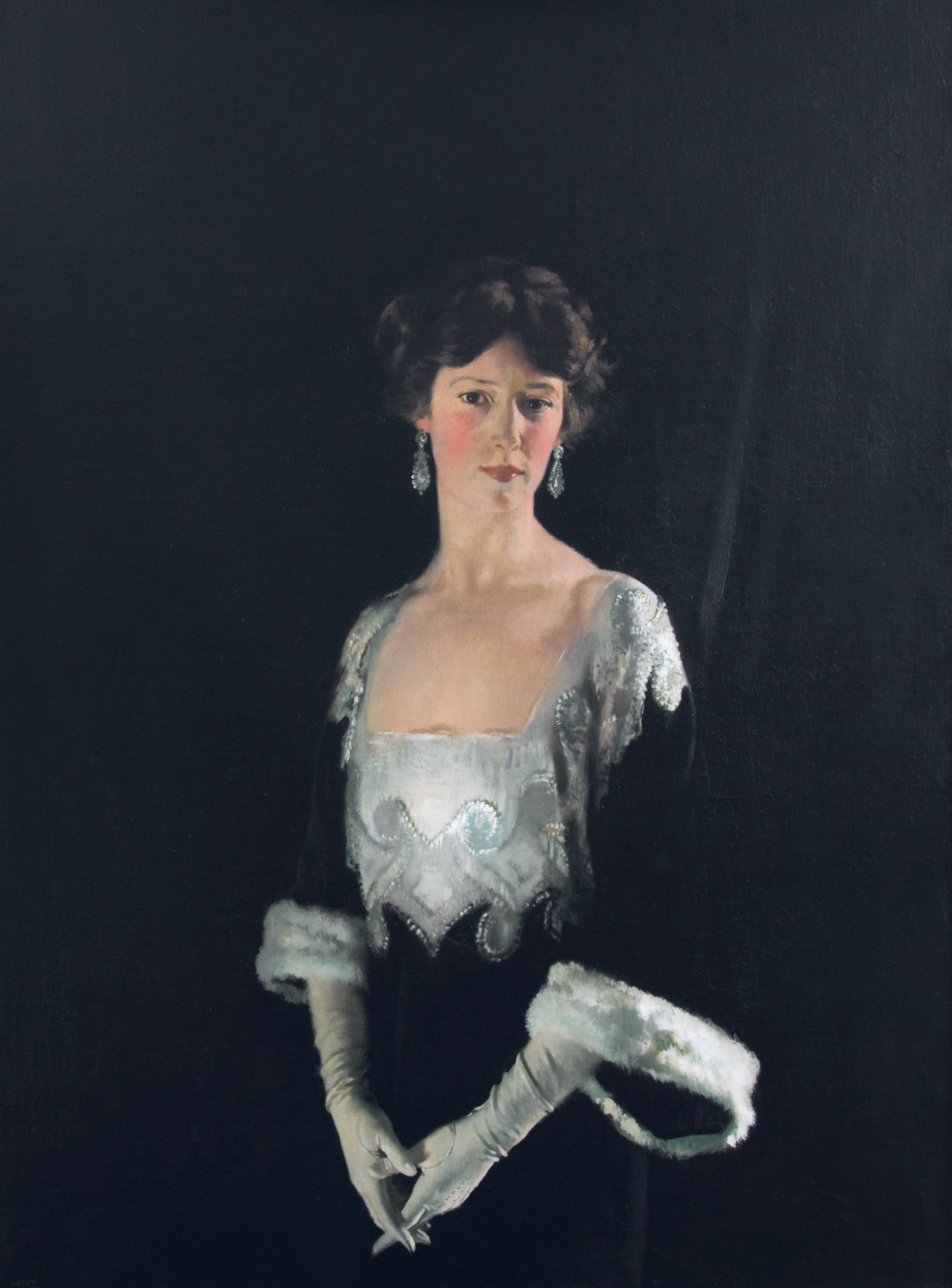
- c. 1915 portrait by Sir William Orpen
- Born: 1878
- Died: 17 August 1958 (aged 79–80)
- Spouse: Geoffrey Taylour, 4th Marquess of Headfort (m. 1901; died 1943)
- Children: William Taylour
- Musical career
- Instrument: Vocals

Rosie Boote (1878 – 17 August 1958) was an Irish Gaiety Girl who became the Marchioness of Headfort when she married in 1901.

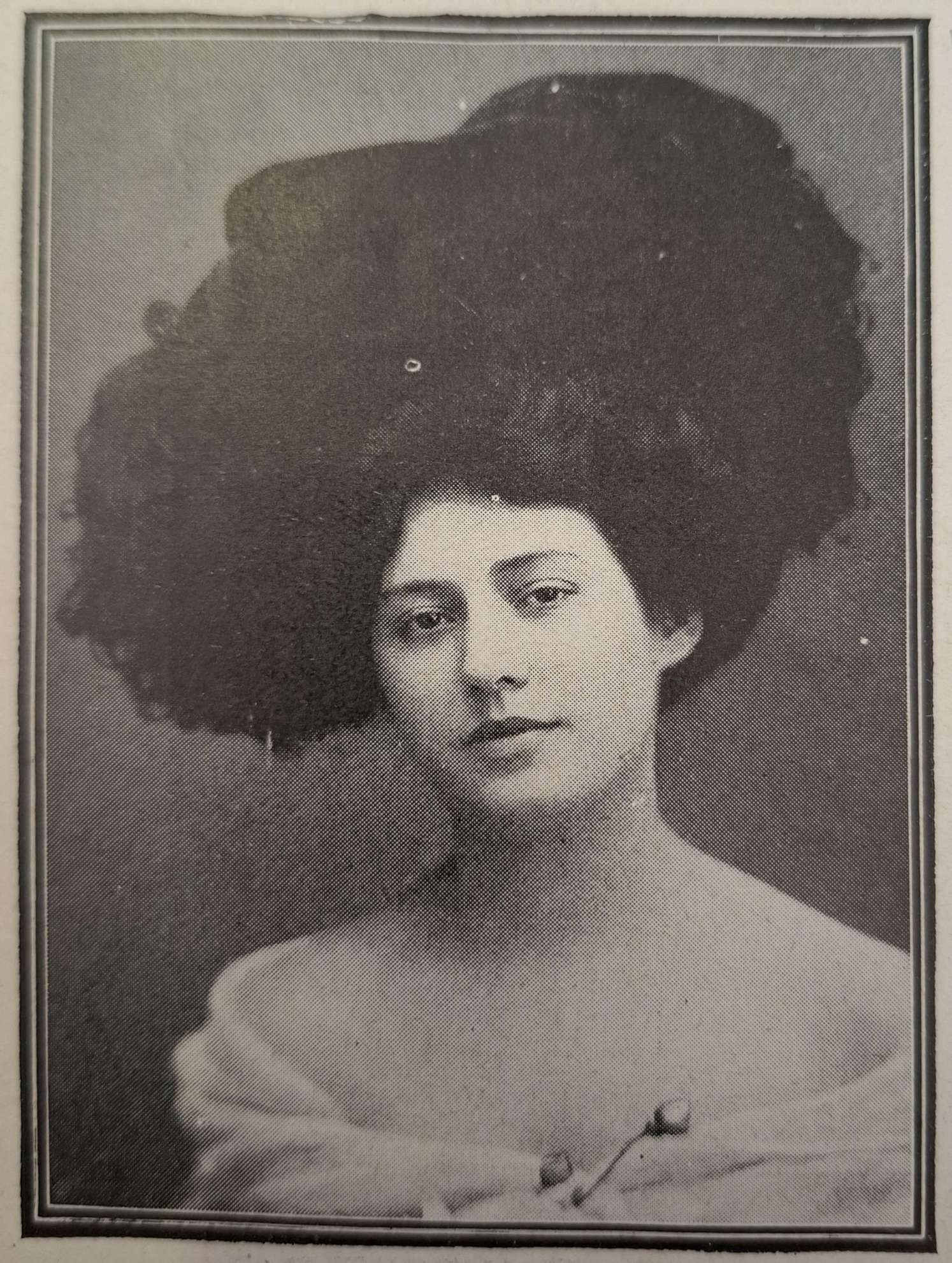
Photo of Rosie Boote as seen in the Black and White Budget, 10 November 1900.

== Early life ==
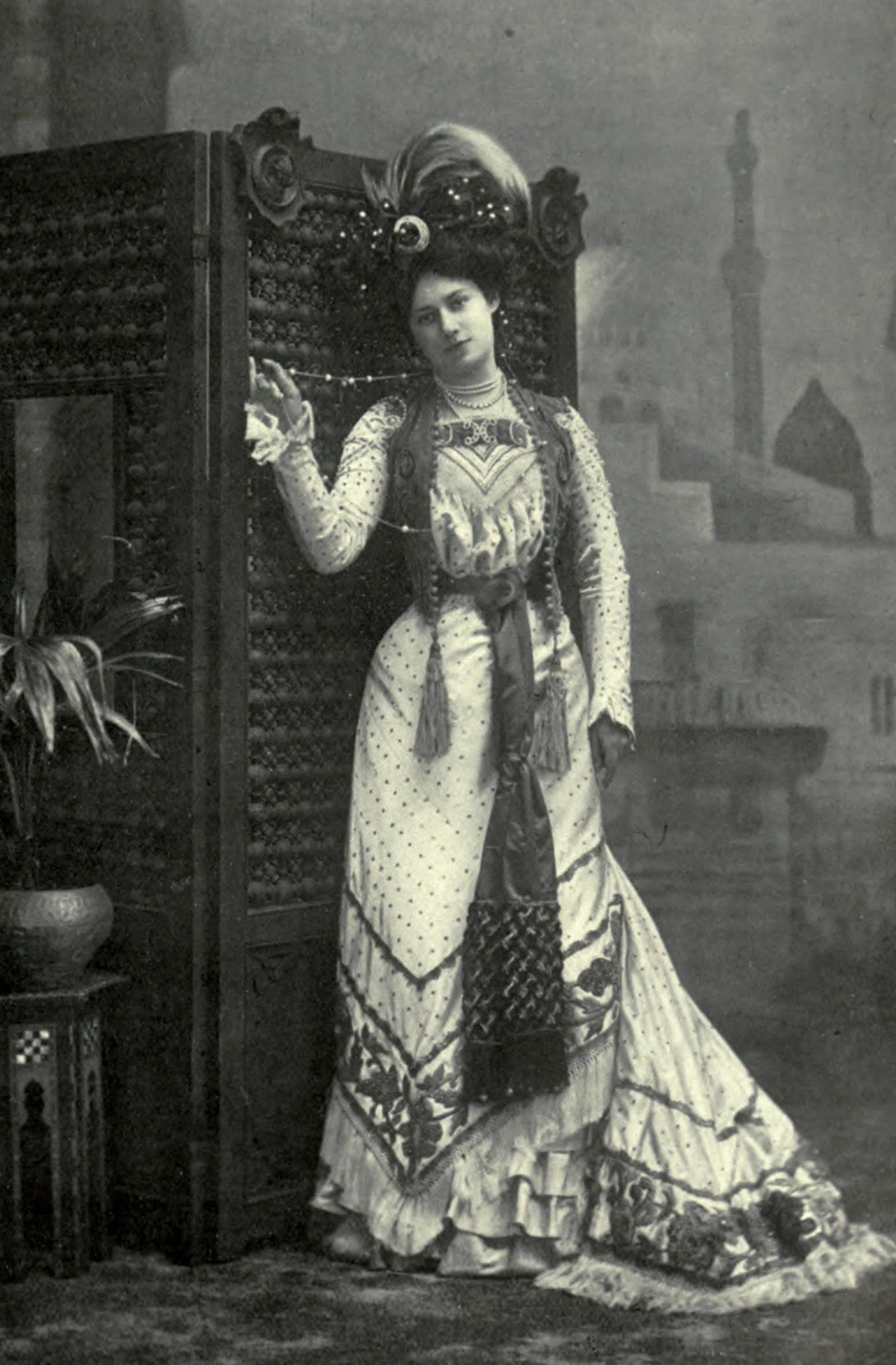
Miss Rosie Boote

Rose Boote may have been born in Ireland, or to Irish parents in England; reports vary on this point. She was also said to have attended a convent school at Clonmel.

Peeresses of the Stage, by Cranstoun Metcalfe (1913) states that "Rose Boote was born in Tipperary, the daughter of the late Charles Boote, a man of independent means". Boote's entry in The Catholic Who's Who for 1952 also gives her father's name as Charles Boote and says she was educated at the Ursuline Convent in Thurles, County Tipperary.

In the 1881 census, a three-year-old Rose Boote was living in Luton, the only child of Charles Boote, a comedian from Nottingham, and his wife Annie, a straw hat maker. Mother and daughter were reported to have been born in Luton. Charles Chamberlain Boote had married Annie Hassall in Luton in 1879. In his My Life and Times, Compton Mackenzie reports that "In 1880 Marie Hassall had married Charles Boote, who had deserted a puritan home in Nottingham to go on the stage." A study of the Compton Comedy Company records that "Marie Hassall, an Irish Catholic actress", was left with a three-year-old daughter when her husband Charles Boote was killed by a star trap while playing Harlequin. The death of Charles Chamberlain Boote is recorded at Nottingham in 1885.

At the time of the 1901 census, which took place on 31 March 1901, Boote was staying at the Metropole Hotel in Folkestone with the Marquess of Headfort. She stated her age as 23, her occupation as actress, and her place of birth as Newcastle, Northumberland.

The autobiography of Faith Compton Mackenzie (1878–1960), As Much as I Dare (1938) recalls that "...the most notable person in the company was the handsome Marie Hassall, mother of Rosie Boote, now Marchioness of Headfort." Compton Mackenzie remembered her playing "Mrs Malaprop, Mrs Candour, Mrs Hardcastle, etc."

== Career and marriage ==
Irish theatre manager George Edwardes moved chorus girl Rosie Boote to London in 1896, to appear in The Runaway Girl. She was especially popular in The Messenger Boy.

On 11 April 1901, at Saltwood Registry Office, near Folkestone, Kent, Rosie Boote married Geoffrey Taylour, 4th Marquess of Headfort, against his family's wishes and causing an international sensation. "Tremendous efforts were made to prevent the marriage by all Lord Headfort's relatives and friends," noted a 1903 summary of the event; even the King attempted to discourage the match. Lord Headfort resigned his military commission to marry Miss Boote, and converted to Roman Catholicism soon after they wed. Theirs was one of the first weddings in a trend of Gaiety Girls marrying titled husbands, and Rosie Boote's acceptance into society set a template for how the rest could be received.

== Later life ==
Lady Headfort had two sons and a daughter, and lived primarily at the family house in County Meath. She attended three kings' coronations at Westminster Abbey. She was widowed in 1943 and died in 1958, aged 80 years, in London.

Portraits of the Marquess and Marchioness by artist Sir William Orpen were auctioned by Sotheby's in London in 2012.

== See also ==
- List of entertainers who married titled Britons
