= Sylvia Storey =

British actress

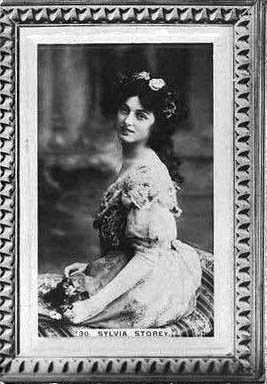
- A publicity card from 1910.
- Born: Sylvia Lillian Storey; 4 October 1889; London
- Died: 20 July 1947 (aged 57); London
- Other names: Countess Poulett, Lady Poulett
- Occupations: Actress, Gaiety Girl, socialite
- Spouse: William Poulett, 7th Earl Poulett
- Children: George Poulett, 8th Earl Poulett Lady Bridget Poulett Phoebe Amie Sybil Poulett

Sylvia Lillian, Countess Poulett (born Sylvia Lillian Storey; 4 October 1889 – 20 July 1947) was a British actress and dancer, a Gaiety Girl who married an Earl and became known as The Countess Poulett.

== Early life ==
Sylvia Lillian Storey was born in London, the only child of William Frederick Clayton Storey (known as Fred Storey) and Lilian Margaret Thorley Holmes Storey. Her parents were actors, and she joined her father in the cast of Rip Van Winkle in 1899.

== Career ==
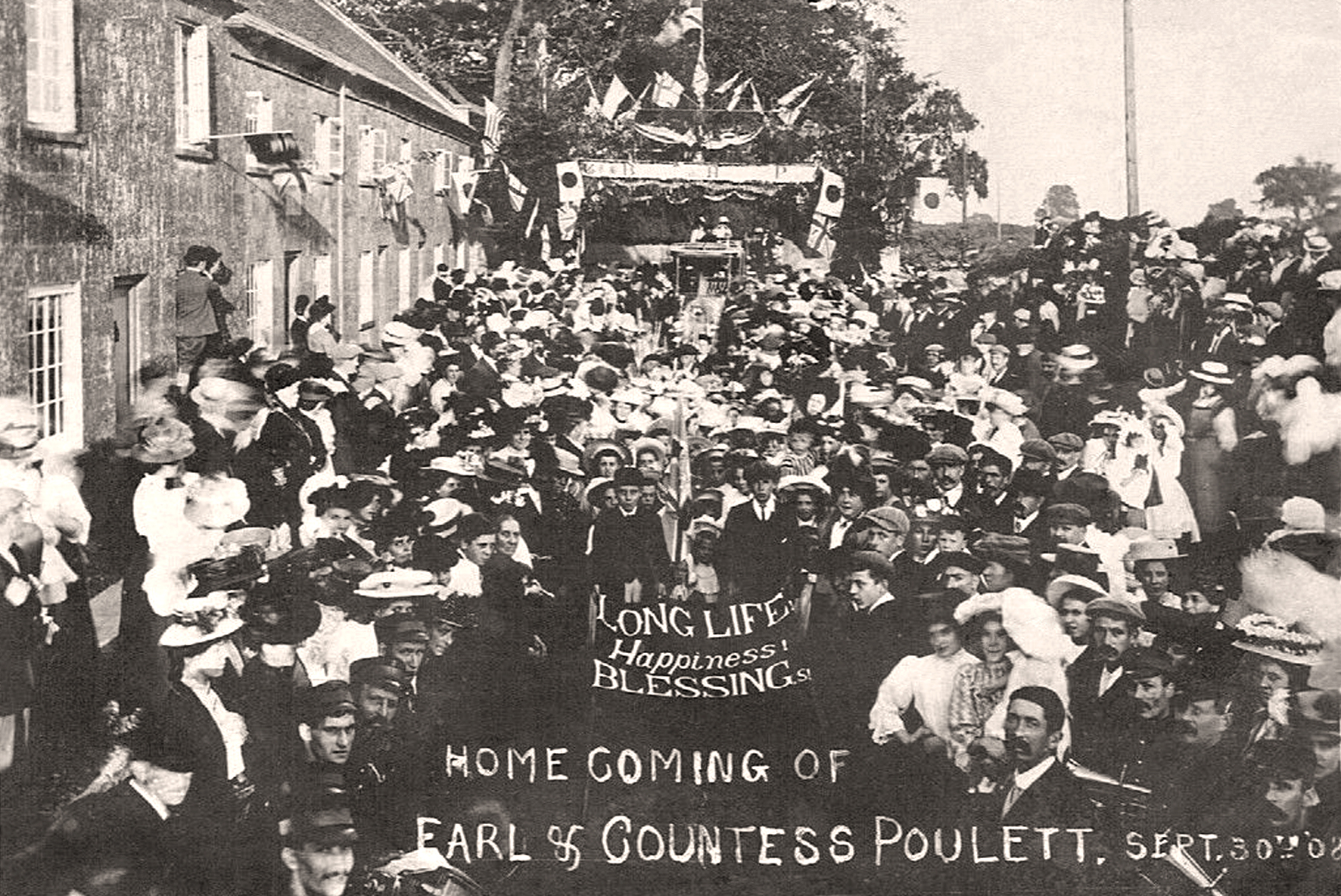
Earl and Countess Poulett 1908 homecoming crowd at Hinton St George, Somerset, England

Sylvia Storey acted and danced on the London stage as a Gaiety Girl, and modeled for postcards, cigarette cards, and other publicity. After she married in 1908, she and her husband traveled around the world, appearing in San Francisco in 1910.

In widowhood, she became a socialite. In 1925, she was rumoured to be keeping late nights with Coco Chanel and the Duke of Westminster on his yacht off Cannes. In consequence, the Duke's angry second wife, Violet Cripps, Baroness Parmoor, threw Poulett's belongings overboard, and her relatives asked the court to take her children from her custody.

Before and during World War II, she spent some time in the United States, especially in Florida, New York, and California. She was fined for violating London's blackout orders in 1940, and took a cottage in Somerset.

== Personal life ==
In 1908, Sylvia Storey married William Poulett, 7th Earl Poulett. He served in the Royal Horse Artillery during World War I, and died in the 1918 flu pandemic. She had two children with Poulett, George Amias Fitzwarrine Poulett (1909-1973), and Lady Bridget Elizabeth Felicia Henrietta Augusta Poulett (1912-1975), and in widowhood a third child, Phoebe Amie Sybil Poulett (1922-1948), whose father was Major Percy Howard Hansen. Storey and Hansen had been engaged but did not marry. Her son married and divorced an actress, Oriel Ross. Poulett died in 1947, aged 57 years, in London.
