= Louisa Cranstoun Nisbett =

English actress (1812–1858)

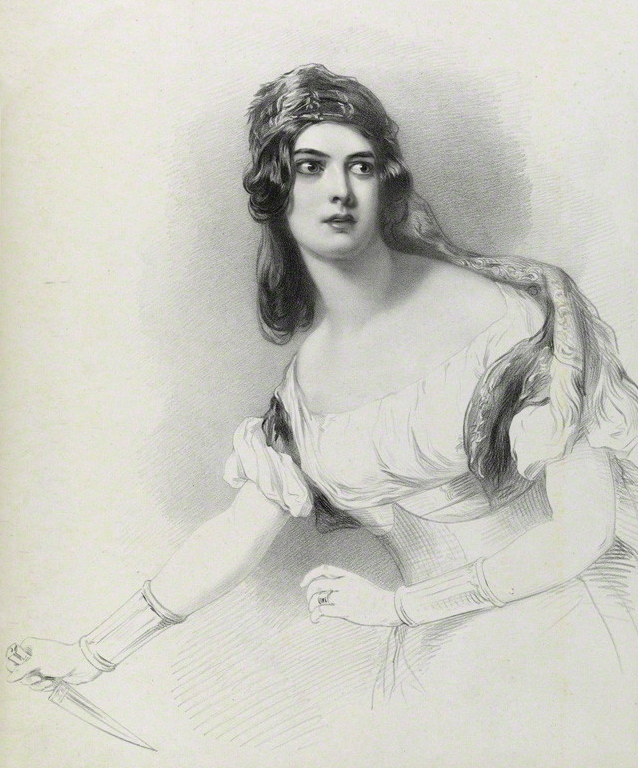
- Born: April 1, 1812; Hackney, London
- Died: January 15, 1858 (aged 45)
- Occupation: Actress

Louisa Cranstoun Nisbett (said to be 1 April 1812 – 15 January 1858), English actress, was the daughter of Frederick Hayes Macnamara, an actor, whose stage name was Mordaunt.

== Biography ==
Louisa Cranstoun Macnamara was born on 1 April 1812 on Balls Pond, Hackney, Middlesex to Jane Elizabeth, née Williams and Frederick Hayes Macnamara, born in St Kitts and Nevis. She was baptised at St John at Hackney. She was one of three daughters. Her paternal aunt was Anna, Lady Cranstoun, and her paternal grandfather John Macnamara was an enslaver and sugar plantation owner in the Caribbean.

As Miss Mordaunt she had considerable experience, especially in Shakespearean leading parts, before her first London appearance in 1829 at Drury Lane as Widow Cheerly in Andrew Cherry's The Soldier's Daughter. Her beauty and high spirits made her at once a popular favourite in a large number of comedy parts, until in 1831 she was married to Captain John Alexander Nisbett and retired. Her husband, however, was killed the same year by a fall from his horse, and she was compelled to reappear on the stage in 1832. She was the original Lady Gay Spanker of London Assurance (1841).

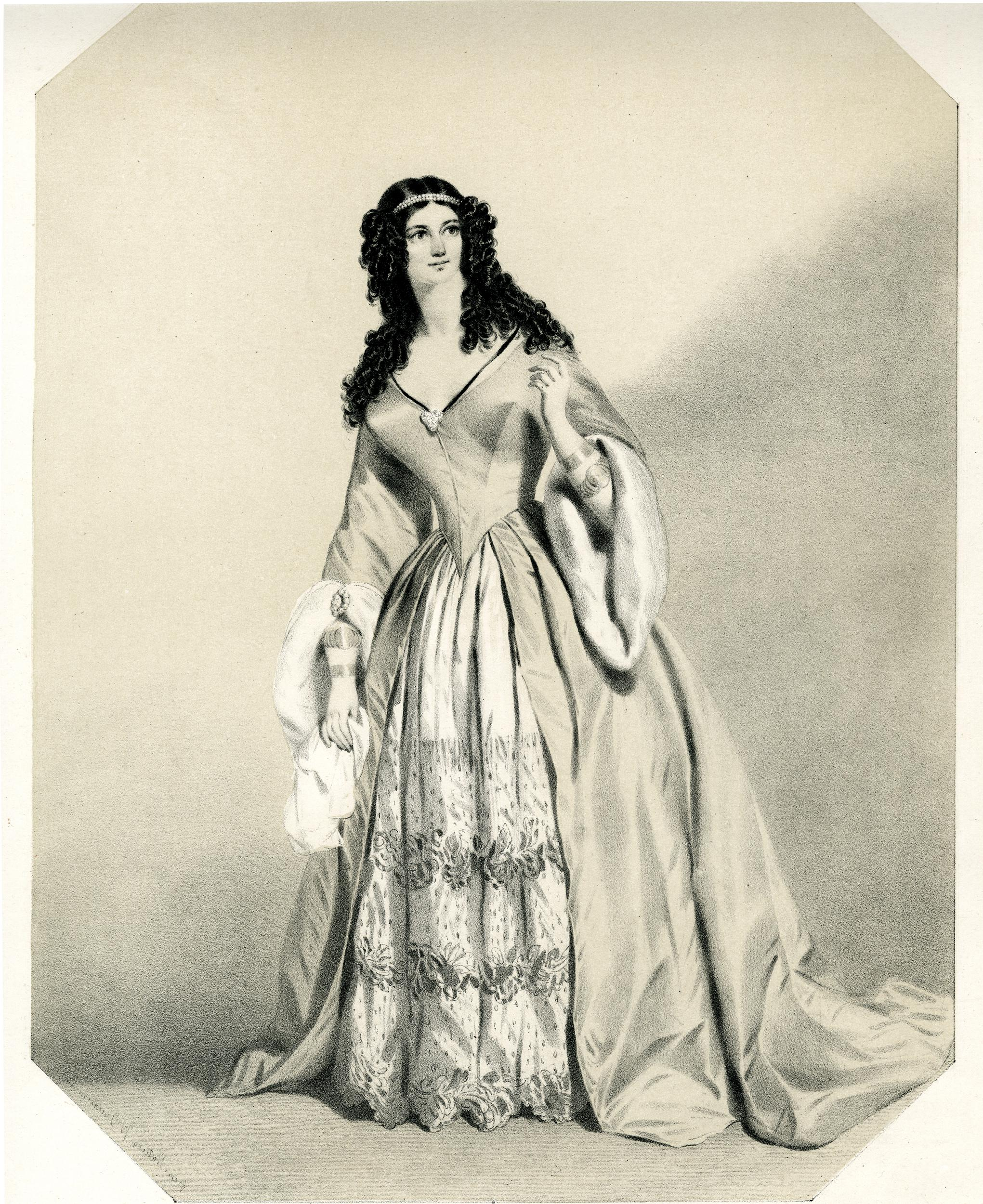
L. C. Nisbett as Constance in The Love Chase

In 1844 she withdrew again from the stage to marry Sir William Boothby, Bart., but on his death (1846), returned to play many parts, including Lady Teazle, Portia, and three dramatic parts created by Knowles: Constantine in The Love Chase and Helen and Julia in The Hunchback. It was as Lady Teazle that she made her final appearance in 1851.

== See also ==
- List of entertainers who married titled Britons
