= Stella Margetson =

British novelist and writer

Stella Margetson in 1948

Stella Margetson (6 March 1912 – 13 April 1992) was a British novelist and writer on historical subjects and social history, particularly specialising on books about the 19th century.

== Biography ==
Stella Margetson was born in Hampstead in London in 1912, the youngest of three children of Laurence Margetson (1874–1928), a hosiery manufacturer, and the actress, singer and stage beauty Florence Collingbourne (1880-1946). She was descended from the artist and illustrator William Henry Margetson and the novelist and journalist Joseph Hatton.

Her plays for BBC Radio Theatre Leading Lady (1954) starring Rupert Davies and Village in the Stars (1955) starring Hubert Gregg were broadcast by the BBC Light Service. For some years she shared a house at 15 Hamilton Terrace in St John's Wood in London with her older sister Colleen Margetson. Apart from her novels and books on historical and social topics Margetson was a prolific author of articles on the latter subjects for such periodicals as History Today and Country Life.

Margetson died in London in 1992 aged 80.

== Selected publications ==
- Victorian High Society, London : Batsford, 1980.
- Victorian People, London : Batsford, 1977.
- The Long Party: High Society in the Twenties and Thirties, London 34 Seymour Rd, N8 0BE : Gordon [and] Cremonesi Ltd, 1976.
- Journey by Stages: Some Account of the People Who Travelled by Stage-coach and Mail in the Years between 1660 and 1840, Cassell, 1967.
- The Prisoners. A novel, London : William Heinemann, 1949.
- Leisure and Pleasure in the Eighteenth Century, London : Cassell, 1970.
- Fifty Years of Victorian London, from the Great Exhibition to the Queen's Death, London : Macdonald & Co., 1969.
- Peter's Wife. A novel, London : William Heinemann, 1948.
- Flood Tide and Other Stories, Bognor Regis : John Crowther, 1943.
- Regency London, London : Cassell, 1971.
- Three Dramatic Monologues: The Whole Truth. Dear Stephen. My Roger, London : Samuel French, 1953
- Miss Swinford Remembers, London; Bognor Regis : John Crowther, 1941
- Leisure and Pleasure in the Nineteenth Century, London : Cassell, 1969.
- St John's Wood, Published for the St. John's Wood Society by Home and Law, c1988.
