= Maudi Darrell =

Actor

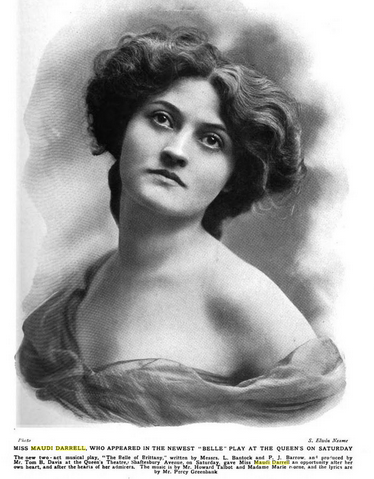
- Maudi Darrell, from a 1908 publication.
- Born: Maud Rhoda Didcott; 10 February 1882; London, England, U.K.
- Died: 31 October 1910 (aged 28)
- Occupations: Actress, Gaiety Girl

Maudi Darrell (born Maud Rhoda Didcott, 10 February 1882 – 31 October 1910) was an English actress on the London and New York stages, and a performer in vaudeville. She was one of the fashionable young women known as "Gaiety Girls".

== Early life ==
Maud Rhoda Didcott was born in London in 1882, the daughter of Hugh Jay Didcott and Rose Fox. Her father was a theatrical agent, and her mother was a dancer who had a novelty act involving singing while skipping rope. Her father was Jewish, but Maudi Didcott was educated at the Sion House Convent at Bayswater. Her sister Violet Raye was also an actress.

== Career ==
Maudi Darrell in The Beauty of Bath (1906)

Maudi Darrell appeared in popular musicals and comedies, including The Beauty of Bath (1906), Mrs. Ponderbury's Past (1907), The Cassilis Engagement (1907), The Gay Gordons (1908), and The Belle of Brittany (1908). Her signature song was "By the Side of the Zuyder Zee", from The Beauty of Bath. She was a popular "postcard actress", with portraits of her sold in postcard format. "Her appearance has the peculiar exotic beauty of a Beardsley drawing," noted one critic, "if she appealed to a boy at all, she would appeal with great force." She had a valuable collection of diamonds, and the "Maharaja of Kuch Behar" (Sir Nripendra Narayan) presented Miss Darrell with "the finest emerald in England", in admiration for her beauty.

== Personal life ==
Maudi Darrell married Scottish-born mill owner Ian Bullough in 1909. She died the following year, from complications of a paralysis of unknown origin and acute appendicitis, aged 28 years. Her widower married again in 1911, to actress Lily Elsie. There were reports that Elsie fell ill from the same illness as Maudi Darrell, almost immediately after marrying Bullough.
