= George Poulett, 8th Earl Poulett =

English peer and landowner

George Amias FitzWarrine Poulett, 8th Earl Poulett (23 June 1909 – 1 March 1973) was an English peer and landowner, a member of the House of Lords for more than forty years, and the last Earl Poulett.

Educated at Eton, he lived at Hinton House, Hinton St George, Somerset, the centre of a large estate inherited from his father, William Poulett, 7th Earl Poulett, in 1918. His mother was the former Sylvia Storey, a Gaiety girl.

He was a pupil apprentice as a mechanical engineer at the GWR Locomotive Works, Swindon, and at the Signal Factory, Reading. In 1940–41 he was technical assistant to the chief mechanical engineer at Woolwich Arsenal, then from 1941 to 1943 an assistant to the Director of Ordnance Factories (Small Arms). He became an Associate of the Institute of Railway Signal Engineers and of the Institute of British Engineers.

He married Oriel Ross on 21 June 1935, they were divorced in 1941; in 1941, he married secondly Olga Lorraine Lawrence, of Svendborg, Denmark, but she died in 1961; in 1968, he married thirdly Margaret Christine Ball. He had no children.

In 1968 he sold the Hinton estate and settled with his last wife in Jersey, Channel Islands. On his death in 1973, all his titles became extinct.

== Notes ==
Peerage of England
Preceded by William Poulett	Earl Poulett; 1918–1973	Extinct
