= William Paulet =

Wiliam Paulet may refer to:

- William Paulet, 1st Marquess of Winchester (1483–1572), English courtier
- William Paulet, 3rd Marquess of Winchester (1532–1598), English courtier, son of John Paulet, 2nd Marquess of Winchester
- William Paulet, 4th Marquess of Winchester (bef. 1598 – 1628), English courtier, son of William Paulet, 3rd Marquess of Winchester
- William Paulet, Lord St John (1587/88–1621), son of William Paulet, 4th Marquess of Winchester
- Lord William Paulet (1804–1893), son of the 13th Marquess and British Army officer

== See also ==
- William Poulett (disambiguation)
