= Poulett-Harris =

Poulett-Harris is a double-barrelled surname, composed of Poulett and Harris. Notable people with the name include:

- Lily Poulett-Harris (1873–1897), Australian sportswoman and educationalist
- Richard Deodatus Poulett-Harris (1817–1899), educationalist in England and Tasmania
