= Bishop Fox's School =

Location
- Bishop Fox Drive; Taunton, Somerset, TA1 3HQ; England
- Coordinates: 51.0061°N 3.0922°W

Information
- Type: Academy
- Motto: High Standards and High Expectations
- Founder: Richard Foxe
- Department for Education URN: 136851 Tables
- Ofsted: Reports
- Head teacher: Kerry Tonkin
- Gender: Mixed
- Age: 11 to 16
- Enrolment: 951
- Website: http://www.bishopfoxs.co.uk/

Bishop Fox's School is a mixed secondary school located in Taunton, Somerset, England.

== History ==
The school traces its history back to the Taunton Grammar School or Tudor Grammar School endowed by the Bishop of Winchester, Richard Foxe, in 1522. The school was housed in what is now referred to as the old Municipal Buildings in Corporation Street. After Taunton Grammar School in Corporation Street closed in 1885, a new girls' grammar school, funded by Bishop Fox's endowment, opened in the former Roman Catholic Church on The Crescent in 1890: it moved to Staplegrove Road in 1895 and to Kingston Road in 1940. It then relocated from Kingston Road into new purpose-built accommodation, on a 30-acre (12.1 ha) site at Bishop Fox Drive, which was opened by Prime Minister, John Major, in 1994.

In September 2003, the school was awarded Specialist Status as a Business and Enterprise College and, in July 2011, it became an Academy. A floodlit astro-turf pitch was installed in summer 2014.

== Accolades ==
The school has been awarded the Gold Artsmark Award three times.

== Notable former pupils ==
- Winifred Hector (1909—2002), nurse and textbook author
- Jack Leach (born 1991), England cricketer
- Laura Lexx (born 1986), comedian
- Mary Sansom (1935–2010), operatic soprano
