= San Toy =

Edwardian musical comedy composed by Sydney Jones

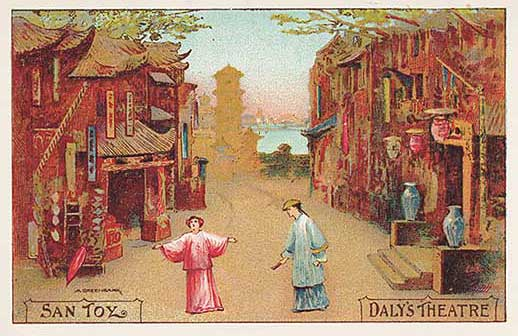

Florence Collingbourne as San Toy

Huntley Wright as "Li"

San Toy, or The Emperor's Own is a "Chinese" musical comedy in two acts with a book by Edward Morton, music by Sidney Jones and lyrics by Harry Greenbank and Adrian Ross. Additional songs were written by Lionel Monckton. The plot centers around a love triangle involving the daughter of a mandarin, who disguises herself as a boy to avoid marriage to a man she does not love and manages, through maneuvering and good luck to reunite with the man she loves, while all ends happily for her father and her father's private secretary.

The musical was first performed at Daly's Theatre, London, on 21 October 1899, and ran for 768 performances (edging out the same composer's The Geisha as the second longest run for any musical up to that time). The cast starred Marie Tempest in the title role, Hayden Coffin, Rutland Barrington, Huntley Wright and Scott Russell. The piece enjoyed international success. In America, San Toy opened at Daly's Theatre on Broadway on 10 October 1900. It was revived at the same theatre in 1901, 1902 and 1905, playing for a total of more than 200 performances in these productions. Marie Celeste played the title role in the original Broadway cast. The piece was regularly performed by amateur theatre groups, particularly in Britain, from 1910 through the 1930s, but it has been produced only rarely since then.

Some of the language and stereotyping in the show reflect the period in which it was written and would not now be considered politically correct, though the lyrics display a gentle mocking of the pretension of Western superiority.

== Roles and original cast ==
- Captain Bobby Preston (Son of Sir George Bingo Preston) – Hayden Coffin
- Yen How (A Mandarin) – Rutland Barrington
- Sir Bingo Preston (British Consul at Pynga Pong) – Fred Kaye
- Sing Hi (President of the Board of Ceremonies) – Colin Coop
- Lieut. Harvey Tucker – Lionel Mackinder
- Fo Hop (A Chinese Student) – Scott Russell
- Fang (A Boatman) – Mr. McLean
- Li Hi, Li Lo (Tartar Guards) – T. H. David and F. Vigay
- Old Mandarin (At Court of Peking) – Ackerman May
- Li – Huntley Wright
- Poppy (Daughter of Sir Bingo) – Hilda Moody
- Dudley (Her Maid) – Gracie Leigh
- Chu (A Widow) – May Buckley
- Wun Lung (Perpetual Corporal of The Emperor's Own) – Gladys Homfrey
- Ko Fan (Of The Emperor's Own) – Maidie Hope
- Yung Shi, Me Koui, Siou, Shuey Pin Sing, Li Kiang, Hu Yu (Wives of Yen How) – Florence Collingbourne, Maroie Fawcett, M. Roche, F. Allen, Ethel Hope and Mary Collette
- Trixie – Topsy Sinden
- Mrs. Harley Streeter – Alice Davis
- Hon. Mrs. Hay Stackporle – K. Francis
- Miss Mary Lambkin – Hilda Coral
- San Toy (Daughter of Yen How) – Marie Tempest / Florence Collingbourne

== Synopsis ==
Act I

In the town of Pynka Pong, where Sir Bing Preston is the British Consul, two jade merchants bribe Li, the private secretary of the mandarin Yen How. Li flirts with Dudley, the maid at the British Consulate, but Li is in love with Ko Fan, one of the Emperor's female guards, a service into which all noble daughters are conscripted. The mandarin, however, has got around the conscription law for his favourite daughter, San Toy, by raising her as a boy. However, the student Fo Hop discovers the secret, and his price for silence is San Toy's hand in marriage. The mandarin allows this on the condition that no one must ever know that San Toy is a girl, cleverly preventing the marriage from happening. San Toy is in love with the Consul's son, naval Captain Bobby Preston, but a marriage between the two would never be permitted by either of their fathers.

Bobby must leave San Toy to go to Peking on his father's business and departs sadly. Fo Hop, discovering their romance, tells San Toy that he will turn her into the model Chinese wife. A new edict from the Emperor is announced, ordering that now all sons, as well as daughters, of mandarins must join a new regiment in Peking, so San Toy must depart for Peking, where she will admit her sex, entering the girls' regiment, and can see Bobby. The mandarin declares that he will also go to Peking and petition the Emperor to return his daughter.

Act II

In the Emperor's Palace at Peking, San Toy is introduced to the Emperor, and he is charmed by her, telling her that she will be treated with favour. Li arrives, followed by Dudley, who entertains the Emperor. The Preston family and consulate staff arrive. Poppy Preston, the Consul's daughter, explains Western marriage customs. San Toy assures Bobby that she is still his, and Yen How and his wives also arrive and are pleased to see that San Toy is receiving the amorous attentions of the Emperor. However, it is declared that the Emperor is astrologically ill-suited to San Toy but well-suited to one of the other girls, leaving San Toy free to marry Bobby, Li to marry his old love Ko Fan, and Yen How to be promoted to Viceroy.

== Musical numbers ==
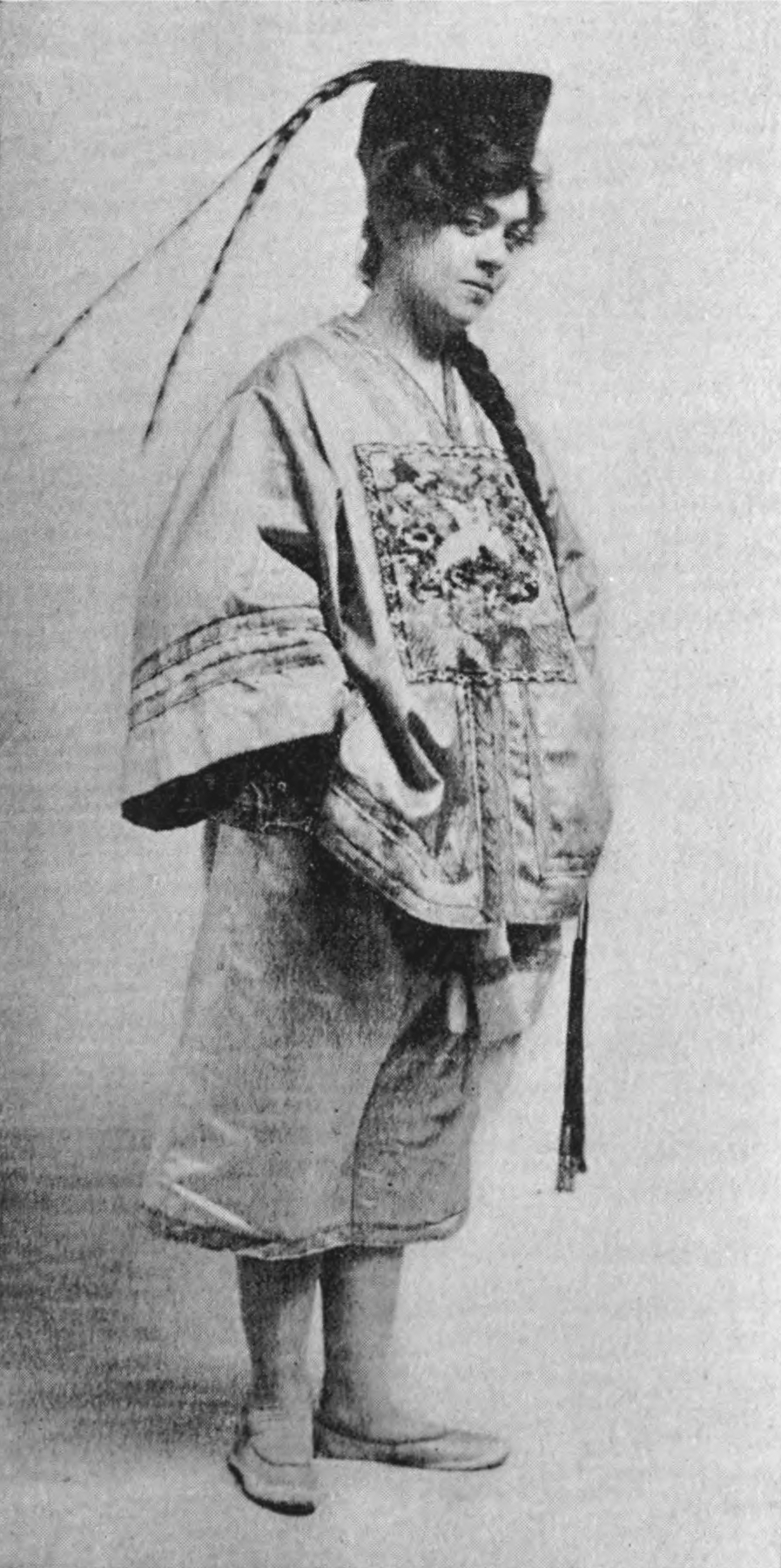
Marie Celeste as San Toy from the Broadway production

ACT I - A Street in Pynka Pong

- No. 1 - Opening Chorus - "On China's empire shining bright, the moon will reach its full tonight..."
- No. 2 - Li, Wai Ho, Ah Wen, Yu Sam & Me Koui - "Of noble kin is the mandarin..."
- No. 3 - Dudley - "A modern lady's maid who serves a modern lady has got to know her trade..."
- No. 4 - Poppy - "Once I was free to roam over the fields at home..."
- No. 5 - Yen How & Wives - "Oh, my name is Yen How, I'm a Mandarin great..." (seven verses)
- No. 6 - San Toy - "Where the plum-tree flower'd gaily in the garden came an Englishman to meet a little maid..."
- No. 7 - San Toy & Bobbie - "Oh my lover, you are clever smart but you've never taught me yet..."
- No. 8 - Concerted Number - "Have you heard there's a girl in the moon? ..."
- No. 9 - Poppy, Dudley, Tucker amp; Li - "You cannot think how dull it is where fashion plates are nullities..."
- No. 10 - Bobbie - "Dear little maid, San Toy, child of the morn are you..."
- No. 11 - San Toy & Fo Hop - "When you are wed to me ... Far sooner dead I'd be..."
- No. 12 - Dudley & Li - "Your marriages here are certainly queer, I do not see what's the attraction..."
- No. 13 - Finale Act I - "We have come here now to renew our protestation..."

ACT II - Hall in Emperor's Palace at Peking

- No. 14 - Solo & Chorus - Sing Hi & Mandarins - "We are the cream of courtly creatures, mighty mandarins..."
- No. 15 - Dudley - "Rhoda Rye was a London lass, taking and trim and tidy..."
- No. 16 - Chorus - "Make room for the Emperor's Own, imposing and splendid, who guard the Imperial Throne..."
- No. 17 - Concerted Number - "At our majestic monarch's behest, welcome the whole barbarian band..."
- No. 18 - Blanche and Chorus - "How are English husbands won? Would you like to know?..."
- No. 19 - Pas Seul
- No. 20 - San Toy & Bobbie - "As I'm a China maid, and you're an Englishman..."
- No. 21 - Entrance of Wives - "We have come to see (squeak) what the palace life is..."
- No. 22 - Chinese Duet - Dudley & Li - "Pletty littee Chinee, welly nice and tiny, livee on a mantel shelf..."
- No. 23 - Poppy, Tucker, Dudley, Li & Chorus - "What joy to know a month or so will see us in town again..."
- No. 24 - Yen How & Chorus - "I used to think a Chinaman was twenty times as fine a man..." (four verses)
- No. 25 - Bobbie - "A many maidens sweet and tender, and fair there are beneath the sun..."
- No. 26 - San Toy - "A butterfly, spreading his shining wing, went fluttering forth in the golden spring..."
- No. 27 - Li - "Blitish sojeman in led, ladie's muffee top-side head, ah!..." (four verses)
- No. 28 - Finale Act II - "Vain was the fond endeavour love and its bond to sever! ..."

Supplementary Numbers

- No. 29 - San Toy - "Little China maids, till their beauty fades, must be hidden..."
- No. 30 - Li - "Life is a mouse trap, open wide; man is the mouse what walk inside..."
- No. 31 - San Toy - "It's very clear, before I came here this wasn't a lively spot..."
- No. 32 - San Toy - "From a country far in the golden west a certain somebody came..."
