= Peregrine Poulett =

British politician

Peregrine Poulett (10 December 1708 – 1752), of Hinton St. George, Somerset, was a British politician who sat in the House of Commons between 1737 and 1752.

Poulett was the second son of John Poulett, 1st Earl Poulett, MP, and his wife Bridget Bertie, daughter of Hon. Peregrine Bertie of Waldershare, Kent.

Poulett was returned as Member of Parliament for Bossiney after a contested by-election on 24 May 1737. He voted with the Government on the Spanish convention in 1739 and the place bill in 1740. He did not stand at the 1741 British general election, but at the 1747 British general election, he was brought in as MP for Bridgwater as a government supporter by his elder twin brother, Lord Poulett, in place of his younger brother, Vere, who had gone over to the Opposition.

Poulett died unmarried on 28 August 1752.

Parliament of Great Britain
Preceded by The Viscount Palmerston; Townshend Andrews	Member of Parliament for Bossiney; 1737–1741; With: The Viscount Palmerston	Succeeded by Richard Liddell; Thomas Foster
Preceded by George Dodington; Vere Poulett	Member of Parliament for Bridgwater; 1747–1752; With: George Dodington	Succeeded by George Dodington; Robert Balch
