= Florence Collingbourne =

Florence Collingbourne in the title role in San Toy (1901)

Florence Eliza Collingbourne (January 1880 – 8 July 1946) was a British actress, singer and stage beauty known for her appearances in Edwardian musical comedies. One of George Edwardes' Gaiety Girls, she took over the title role in San Toy and originated the role of Nancy Staunton in The Toreador.

== Life and career ==
Collingbourne was born in Camberwell in London in 1880, the daughter of Maria Eleanor née Witham (1858–1888) and Henry Ashdown Collingbourne (1859-), a printer's labourer. Her mother died when she was 8 years old, following which she was raised by her aunt and uncle. She was living alone in Camberwell in 1901.

Her stage appearances include a series of Edwardian musical comedies produced by George Edwardes, such as A Greek Slave at Daly's Theatre (1898) and Gladys Stourton in A Gaiety Girl at the Gaiety Theatre (1899). She originated the small role of Yung Shi (and later took over the title role) in San Toy at Daly's (1899–1900), Girl in The Wicked Uncle at the Gaiety (1900) and Nancy Staunton in The Toreador at the Gaiety (1901–1902).

She left the production to marry Laurence Margetson (1874–1928), a hosiery manufacturer, with whom she had three children: William Laurence Margetson (1902–1992); Colleen Mary Margetson (1908–1995), and the novelist and writer Stella Margetson (1912–1992). After her marriage she retired from acting. In 1906 she briefly came out of retirement to appear in a farewell benefit for Emily Soldene at the Palace Theatre, London with Seymour Hicks and Rutland Barrington among others where she sang 'L'Ete' by Madame Chaminade. In her later years she lived at The Holdynge, Aldwick Avenue in Bognor Regis in Sussex.

Collingbourne died aged 66 at the District Hospital in Dorking in Surrey in 1946. In her will she left £27,306 7s 9d to her children.

== Sources ==
- Wearing, J. P. The London Stage 1890–1899: A Calendar of Productions, Performers, and Personnel, Rowman & Littlefield (2013) ISBN 0-8108-9281-2
- Wearing, J. P. The London Stage 1900–1909: A Calendar of Productions, Performers, and Personnel, Rowman & Littlefield (2014) ISBN 0-8108-9293-6
