= Sir George Dallas, 1st Baronet =

British barrister and poet

Sir George Dallas, 1st Baronet (6 April 1758 – 14 January 1833), was a British barrister and poet. Although he lived in England, he came from a Scottish family. He was created a baronet, of Upper Harley Street in the County of Middlesex, on 31 July 1798. He briefly succeeded William Hamilton Nisbet as one of the Members of Parliament for Newport, Isle of Wight, in 1800, holding the seat only until the next election in 1802.

Dallas and his brother Robert were educated first at James Elphinston's school in Kensington and then in Geneva by the pastor Chauvet. After entering the legal profession, Dallas became a judge.

On 11 June 1788, Dallas married Margaret Catherine Blackwood, the daughter of Sir John Blackwood, 2nd Baronet, and Dorcas, Lady Dufferin and Claneboye. Their son was Sir Robert Dallas, 2nd Baronet (23 December 1804 – 2 August 1874). Their daughter, Marianne Dallas, married Sir Peter Parker, 2nd Baronet. Another daughter, Catherine, married the Hon. George Poulett RN, and thanks to a series of deaths, her son William Henry Poulett (1827–1899) unexpectedly became the 6th Earl Poulett.

== Arms ==
Coat of arms of Sir George Dallas, 1st Baronet
Crest A crescent quarterly Or and Gules Escutcheon Argent a bend Azure between three mullets Sable. Motto Lux Venit Ab Alto (Light Comes From On High)

Parliament of Great Britain
Preceded by William Hamilton Nisbet; Andrew Strahan	Member of Parliament for Newport; 1800; With: Andrew Strahan	Succeeded by Parliament of the United Kingdom
Parliament of the United Kingdom
Preceded by Parliament of Great Britain	Member of Parliament for Newport; 1801–1802; With: Andrew Strahan	Succeeded by John Blackburn; Richard Gervas Ker
Baronetage of Great Britain
New creation	Baronet (of Upper Harley Street); 1798–1833	Succeeded by Robert Dallas
