= Townsend Andrews =

British official and Whig politician

Townsend Andrews (20 November 1702 – 1737) of Coulston, Wiltshire, was a British official and Whig politician who sat in the House of Commons from 1727 to 1737.

Andrews was the eldest son of Thomas Andrews of Highgate, Middlesex, and his wife Sarah Townsend, daughter of John Townsend of Highgate, soapmaker of London. He was educated at Merchant Taylors' School in 1717 and was admitted at Clare College, Cambridge in 1718 and at Inner Temple in 1718. He succeeded his father before November 1721 and to the estates of his maternal grandfather, John Townsend, at Tytherton Lucas and elsewhere in Wiltshire in 1725. He married Catherine Gibson, daughter of Thomas Gibson before 1731.

Andrews became deputy paymaster of the forces by 1727 and held the post for the rest of his life. At the 1727 British general election he was returned as Member of Parliament for Hindon as a government supporter in a fierce contest, against Henry Fox. He seconded the Address on 13 January 1730 in a ‘studied’ but ‘fluent’ speech. When Sir William Strickland, the secretary at war, was absent, Andrews introduced the army estimates on 2 February 1733, justifying them on the basis of a Jacobite threat. When he introduced the army estimates again on 6 February 1734, he claimed that it naturally fell to him because of his post as deputy paymaster. At the 1734 British general election he was transferred from Hindon to make way for Fox, and was returned unopposed as MP for Bossiney instead. He moved the army estimates again in 1735 and seconded them when the secretary at war introduced them in 1737. Lord Egmont referred to him as ‘deputy secretary at war’.

Andrews died on 6 May 1737.

Parliament of Great Britain
| Preceded by Henry Ludlow Coker; Robert Gray | Member of Parliament for Hindon; 1727–1734; With: George Heathcote | Succeeded by Stephen Fox; George Fox |
| Preceded by James Cholmondeley; John Hedges | Member of Parliament for Bossiney; 1734– 1737; With: The Viscount Palmerston | Succeeded by The Viscount Palmerston; Peregrine Poulett |
