= John Paulet =

John Paulet may refer to:

- Sir John Paulet (fl. 1497–1501), soldier; commander at the battle of Blackheath, 1497
- John Paulet, 2nd Marquess of Winchester (c. 1510–1576)
- John Paulet, 5th Marquess of Winchester (c. 1598–1675)
- John Paulet, 14th Marquess of Winchester (1801–1887), British peer and soldier

== See also ==
- John Poulett (disambiguation)
