= William Poulett, 6th Earl Poulett =

English peer, landowner, army officer and racehorse owner

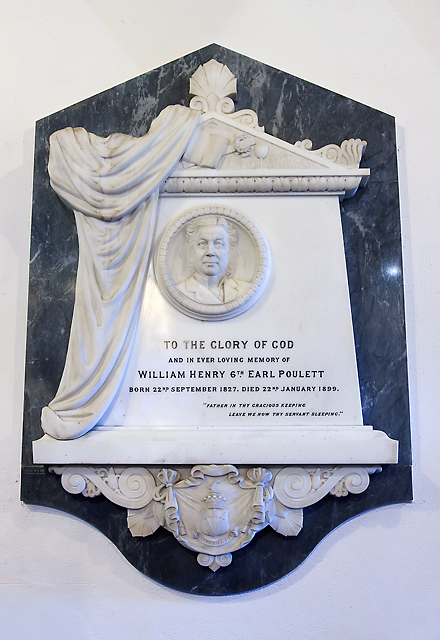
Monument to Poulett at Hinton St George in Somerset

William Henry Poulett, 6th Earl Poulett (22 September 1827 – 22 January 1899) was an English peer, landowner, army officer, and racehorse owner. In the House of Lords he was a Conservative.

== Early life ==
When Poulett was born in 1827, his chance of inheriting the family estates seemed remote. He was the third son of Vice-Admiral the Hon. George Poulett RN (1786–1854), who was the second son of the 4th Earl and the brother of the 5th Earl, who already had three sons. His mother, Catherine Poulett, was a daughter of Sir George Dallas, 1st Baronet. He joined the 54th (West Norfolk) Regiment of Foot in 1840 and was educated at the Royal Military College, Sandhurst, passing out in 1842. Commissioned into the 54th Regiment, in 1846 he transferred to the 2nd Queen’s Royals, then from 1852 to 1857 was with the 22nd Regiment in India, taking part in the British expedition from Peshawar to the Boroe Valley in 1853, and was with Brigadier-General Boileau at the storming of the heights.

== Inheritance ==
In 1857, news reached Poulett in India that both surviving sons of his uncle the 5th Earl had died: Amias Poulett on 20 February 1857, and Vere Poulett, Viscount Hinton, on 29 August 1857. As Poulett's own father and older brothers had also died, this left him unexpectedly as the heir presumptive to the family estates, and he returned to England. From 1858 to 1870, he hunted the Hambledon Foxhounds six days a week. In 1864, as foreseen, he succeeded his uncle, the 5th Earl Poulett, inheriting Hinton House and about 11,000 acres, mostly around Hinton St George in Somerset, with a second country house at Granville Hall, in Droxford, Hampshire. He became a racehorse owner, specialising in National Hunt, and owned The Lamb, winner of the Grand National in 1868 and 1871. Another of his horses, Benazal, won twenty-seven steeple-chases and other races. In Who's Who, Poulett gave his recreations as "Racing, hunting, steeple-chasing, shooting, driving, yachting, fishing, telegraphy, and photography". He was a member of the Army and Navy Club, Arthur’s, the Wellington Club, the Royal Albert Yacht Club, the Royal London Yacht Club, and others.

== Personal life ==
Poulett married three times. First, on 23 June 1849, he married Elizabeth Lavinia, daughter of Joseph Newman of Landport. However, he soon discovered she was already pregnant, and she admitted the father was a Capt. William Turnour Granville, with whom he heard she had been living in Dublin prior to their marriage. Poulett left her on 8 August 1849. She gave birth six months after their marriage to a son at Southsea, Hampshire:

- William Turnour Thomas Poulett, Viscount Hinton (15 December 1849 – 8 April 1909), unsuccessfully claimed peerage

A birth announcement appeared days after the birth, announcing Poulett and his wife had welcomed a son. In 1869, W. T. T. Poulett married Lydia Ann Shippey, the daughter of William Shippey, a general dealer.

She died in 1871. Later that year he married, secondly, Emma Sophia Johnson, who died in 1876. They had a son, born prior to their marriage, and a daughter.

- William Henry George Poulett (1 April 1870 – )
- Maud

In November 1871, W. T. T. Poulett petitioned the Court for Divorce and Matrimonial Causes for a Declaration of Legitimacy, to establish that he was the lawful son of William Henry Poulett, now the 6th Earl. In 1875, he was living at the family's secondary estate, Grenville Hall, Droxford, under the courtesy title of Viscount Hinton. However, after the birth of William John Lydston Poulett in 1883, W. T. T. Poulett was again disowned.

Lastly, in 1879, he married Rosa, daughter of Alfred Hugh (de) Melville, an artist. They had three children:

- William John Lydston Poulett, Viscount Hinton (1883–1918)
- Lady Eleanor Augusta Rosa (9 October 1879 – )
- Lady Violet Nita (5 October 1880 – ), married Capt. Cecil John Talbot Rhys Wingfield (1881–1915; died of wounds received in First World War) and was the mother of Maj. Edward William Rhys Wingfield (1905–1984) who married Lady Norah Beryl Cayzer Rhys Jellicoe, daughter of Admiral-of-the-Fleet Earl Jellicoe

== Dispute ==
Following the 6th Earl's death, the Poulett earldom and its entailed estates were claimed by W. T. T. Poulett, and on 27 July 1903, on a report from its Committee of Privileges, the House of Lords determined the dispute in favour of the 6th Earl's fifteen-year-old son, William John Lydston Poulett. In a curious turn of events, Wilhelmina Powlett, Duchess of Cleveland, the widow of a distant kinsman of the 6th Earl Poulett, left W. H. G. Poulett a bequest of £5,000 in her will, and he became a tea-planter in Ceylon.

== Notes ==
Peerage of England
Preceded by John Poulett	Earl Poulett; 1864–1899	Succeeded by William Poulett
