= Gaiety Girls =

Chorus girls in Edwardian musical comedies

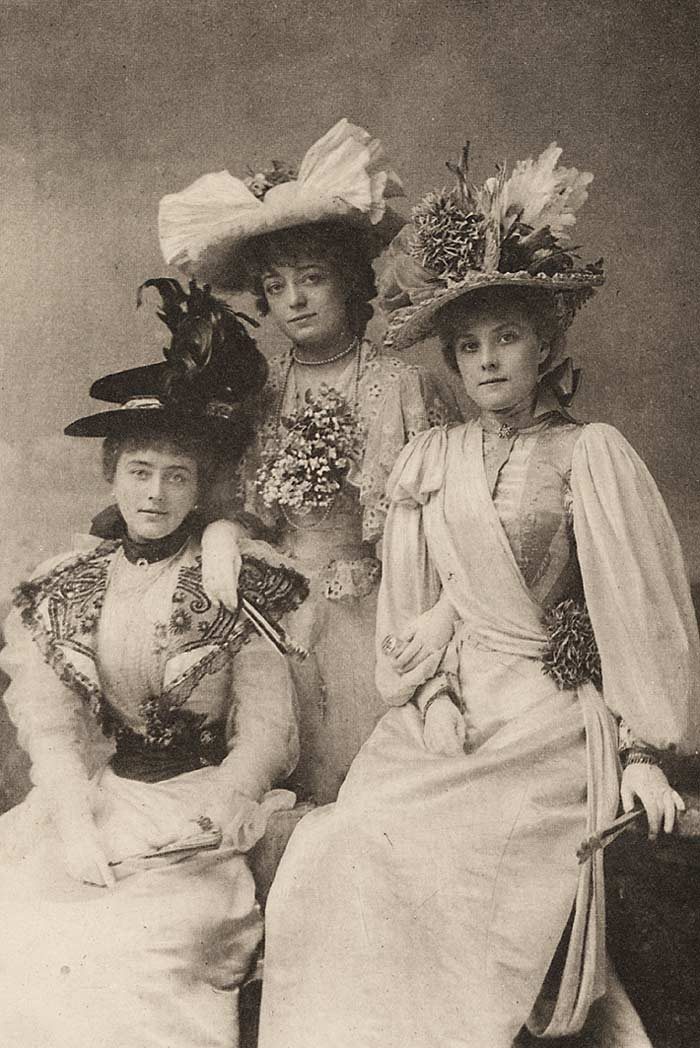
Gaiety Girls in The Geisha, 1896; Blanche Massey center

Gaiety Girls were the chorus girls in Edwardian musical comedies, beginning in the 1890s at the Gaiety Theatre, London, in the shows produced by George Edwardes. The popularity of this genre of musical theatre depended, in part, on the beautiful dancing corps of "Gaiety Girls" appearing onstage in bathing attire and in the latest fashions. The 1890s Gaiety Girls were respectable, elegant young ladies, unlike the actresses from London's earlier musical burlesques. Later, even the stars of these musical comedies were referred to as Gaiety Girls.

== Description ==
=== Fashion icons ===
An American newspaper reviewing A Gaiety Girl in 1894 explained the importance of the Gaiety Girls: "The piece is a mixture of pretty girls, English humor, singing, dancing and bathing machines and dresses of the English fashion. The dancing is a special feature of the performance, English burlesques giving much more attention to that feature of their attractiveness than the American entertainments of the same grade do." Many of the best-known London couturiers designed costumes for stage productions by the 1890s. The illustrated periodicals were eager to publish photographs of the actresses in the latest stage hits, and so the theatre became an excellent way for clothiers to publicise their latest fashions.

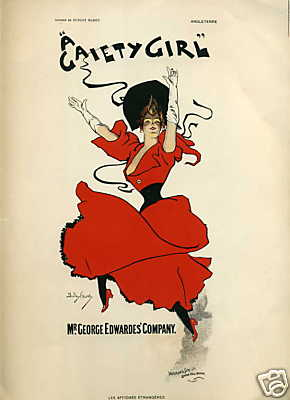
Poster for A Gaiety Girl

Gaiety girls were polite, well-behaved young women. They became a popular attraction and a symbol of ideal womanhood. Edwardes arranged with Romano's Restaurant, on the Strand, for his girls to dine there at half-price. It was good exposure for the girls and made Romano's the centre of London's night-life. Many of the Gaiety Girls, such as Marie Studholme, Ellaline Terriss, Lily Elsie, Florence Collingbourne, Cicely Courtneidge, Gladys Cooper, Phyllis Dare, Zena Dare, Mabel Love, Evelyn Laye, Jennie McNulty, Gaby Deslys, Camille Clifford, Gabrielle Ray, Sylvia Grey and Constance Collier, later enjoyed substantial acting careers. One Gaiety Girl, Mabel Russell, became a Member of Parliament.

=== Stage Door Johnnies; marriage into the upper class ===
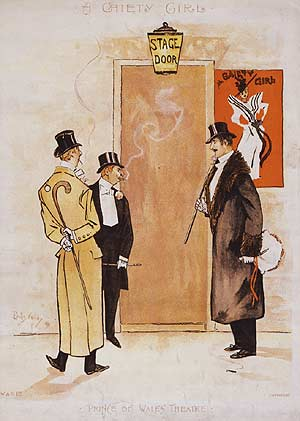
Stage Door Johnnies waiting after A Gaiety Girl

The young ladies appearing in Edwardes's shows became so popular that wealthy gentlemen, termed "Stage Door Johnnies", would wait outside the stage door hoping to escort them to dinner. In some cases, a marriage into society and even the nobility resulted. For example, May Gates, a chorus girl in The Beauty of Bath, married a nobleman, Baron Von Ditton, of Norway. Similarly, Sylvia Storey, another chorister in the same show, married William Poulett, 7th Earl Poulett. Maudi Darrell and Lily Elsie both married the same wealthy Scotsman, Ian Bullough. Gertie Millar became the Countess of Dudley, and Olive May married into the peerage twice. First, she became Lady Victor Paget (marrying in 1913 and divorcing in 1921) and then the Countess of Drogheda (marrying the 10th Earl in 1922). Another Gaiety Girl, Birdie Sutherland, in 1896, sued Dudley Marjoribanks for breach of promise of marriage and was awarded £5,000 plus costs. The potential for such relationships was an underlying theme of many of the stories of P. G. Wodehouse, particularly those set at Blandings Castle.

Alan Hyman, an expert on burlesque theatre who penned the 1972 book The Gaiety Years, wrote:

At the old Gaiety in the Strand the chorus was becoming a matrimonial agency for girls with ambitions to marry into the peerage and began in the nineties when Connie Gilchrist, a star of the Old Gaiety, married the 7th Earl of Orkney and then in 1901, the 4th Marquess of Headfort married Rosie Boote, who had charmed London the previous year when she sang Maisie in The Messenger Boy. After Connie Gilchrist and Rosie Boote had started the fashion a score of the Guv'nor's budding stars left him to marry peers or men of title while other Gaiety Girls settled for a banker or a stockbroker. The Guv’nor finding this was playing ducks and drakes with his theatrical plans had a 'nuptial clause' inserted in every contract.... Debutantes were competing with the other girls to get into the Gaiety chorus while upper-class youths were joining the ranks of the chorus boys.
