= Edward Morton (author) =

British writer (1858–1922)

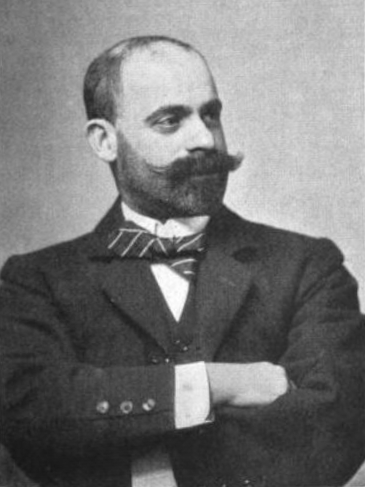
- In The Sketch, 25 October 1899

Background information
- Born: 1858
- Died: 6 July 1922 (aged 63–64)
- Occupation(s): Author, singer

Edward A. Morton (1858 – 6 July 1922) was a British writer. His works included the musical comedy San Toy.

== Biography ==
Edward Morton was born in 1858.

The only child of Morton and his wife Rosamond was J. B. Morton, who became a noted columnist and humourist.

Edward Morton died in a nursing home in London on 6 July 1922, aged 63 or 64.
