= Vere Poulett, 3rd Earl Poulett =

English peer

Arms of Poulett: Sable, three swords pilewise points in base proper pomels and hilts or

Vere Poulett, 3rd Earl Poulett (18 May 1710 – 14 April 1788), styled The Honourable Vere Poulett until 1764, was an English peer.

Poulett was the son of John Poulett, 1st Earl Poulett, and Bridget Bertie, daughter of Peregrine Bertie. He was the brother of John Poulett, 2nd Earl Poulett, Peregrine Poulett and Anne Poulett, and was educated at Taunton Grammar School. He was returned to parliament for Bridgwater in 1741, a seat he held until 1747. He succeeded his elder brother in the earldom in 1764. In 1771 he was appointed Lord Lieutenant of Devon, which he remained until his death.

Lord Poulett married Mary Butt, daughter of Richard Butt, of Arlington, Gloucestershire. Their younger son the Honourable Vere Poulett was a soldier and politician. Lord Poulett died in April 1788, aged 77, and was succeeded in the earldom by his elder son, John. The Countess Poulett died in April 1819.

Parliament of Great Britain
Preceded by George Dodington; Charles Wyndham	Member of Parliament for Bridgwater; 1741–1747; With: George Dodington	Succeeded by George Dodington; Hon. Peregrine Poulett
Political offices
Preceded by The Duke of Bedford	Lord Lieutenant of Devon; 1771–1788	Succeeded by The Earl Fortescue
Peerage of England
Preceded by John Poulett	Earl Poulett; 1764–1788	Succeeded by John Poulett
