= John Poulett, 4th Earl Poulett =

British peer and militia officer

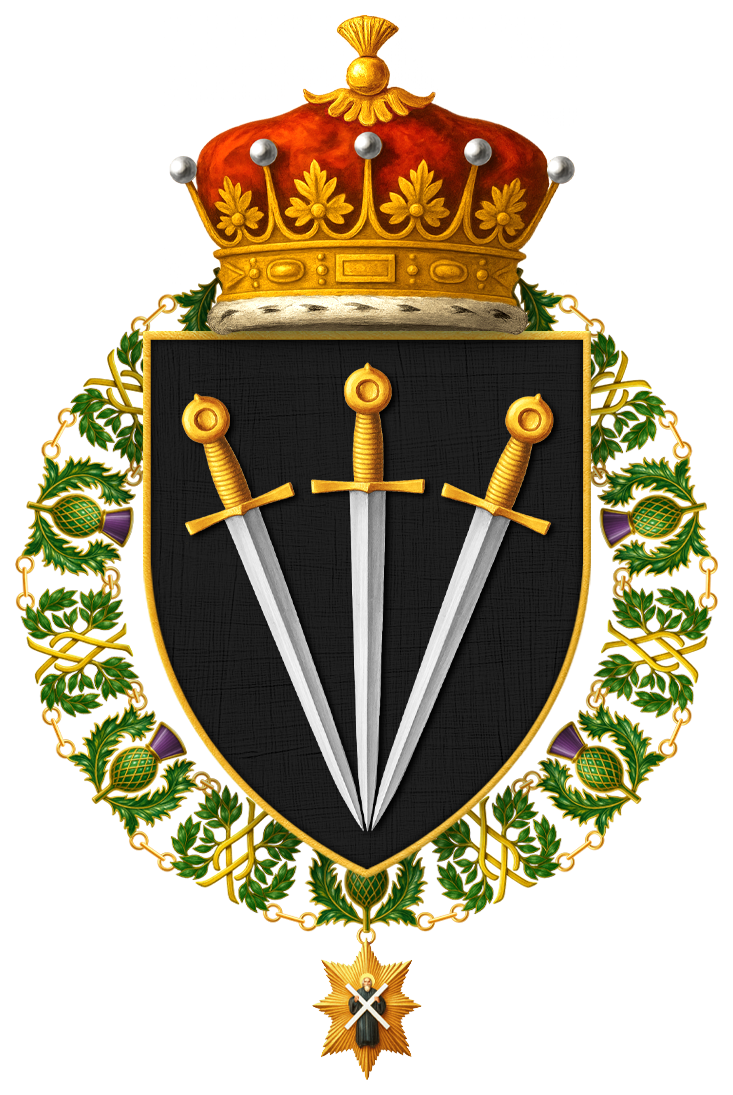
Shield of arms of John Poulett, 4th Earl Poulett, KT - Sable, three swords pilewise points in base proper pomels and hilts or

John Poulett, 4th Earl Poulett KT (3 April 1756 – 14 January 1819), styled Viscount Hinton between 1764 and 1788, was a British peer and militia officer.

== Early life ==
Poulett was the son of Vere Poulett, 3rd Earl Poulett, by Mary Butt, daughter of Richard Butt, of Arlington, Gloucestershire. From 22 January 1779 until 1798 he was Colonel of the East Devon Militia, which was on active service in home defence until 1783.

== Career ==
He succeeded his father in the earldom in 1788. In 1792 he was appointed Lord Lieutenant of Somerset, a post he held until his death. He was also a Recorder of Bridgwater. The East Devon Militia was again embodied, under his colonelcy, for active service in March 1794, and he was also commissioned colonel of the Somersetshire Fencible Cavalry. On 30 May, he was invested a Knight of the Thistle. He was appointed a Lord of the Bedchamber to George III on 19 November 1795, an office he held until his death. When the colonel of the 1st Somerset Militia died, Poulett as lord lieutenant took personal command as colonel of the regiment on 25 October 1798. He was also commissioned as colonel of the East Somerset Regiment of Yeomanry Cavalry on 17 September 1803.

== Personal life ==
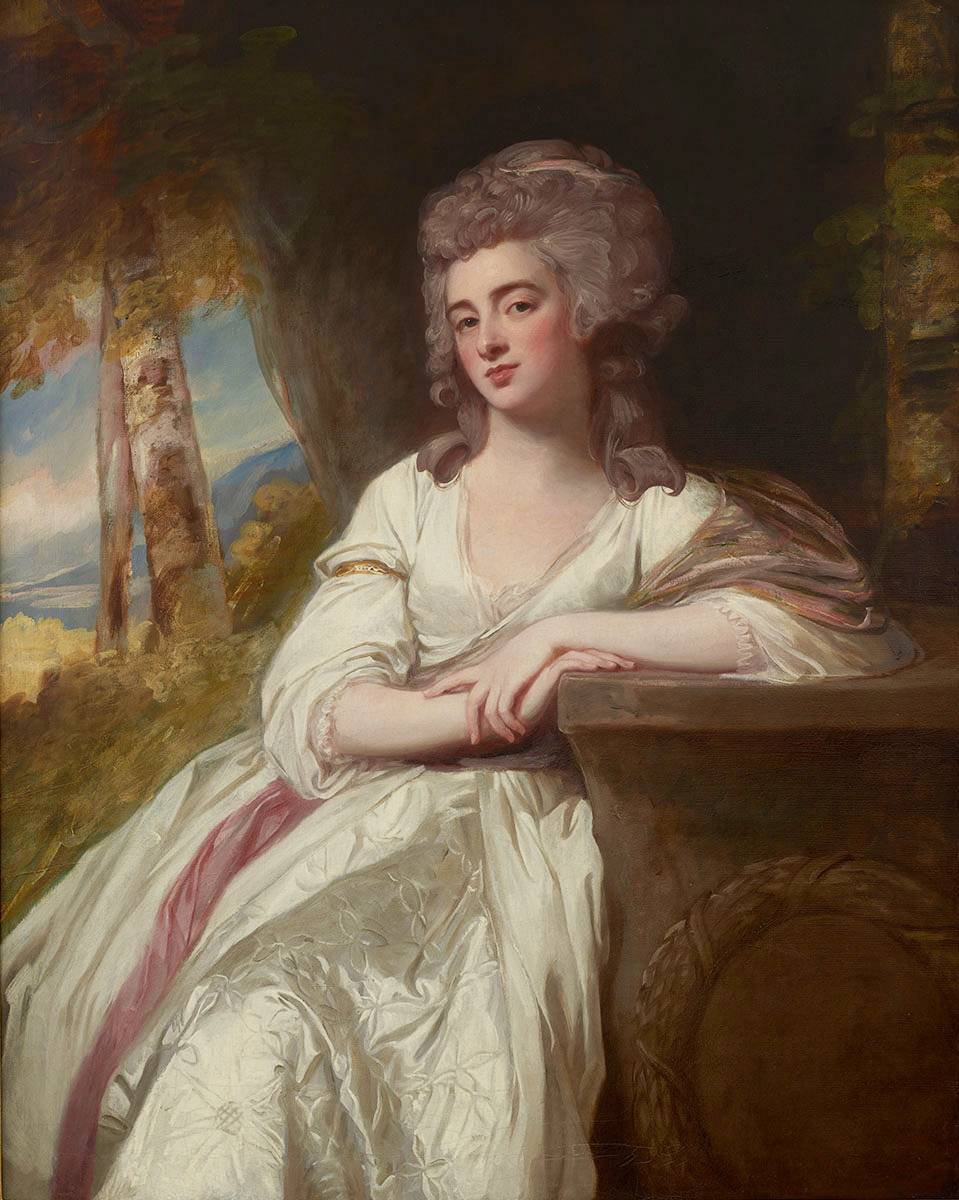
Lord Poulett's second wife, Margaret Smith-Burgess, portrait by George Romney

Lord Poulett married firstly Sophia Pocock, daughter of Admiral Sir George Pocock, in 1782. They had ten children, including:

- John Poulett, 5th Earl Poulett (1783–1864), who married Charlotte Fanny Portman, daughter of Henry Berkeley Portman and Hon. Lucy Dormer (a daughter of the 8th Baron Dormer), in 1820.
- Lady Sophia Poulett (1785–1859), who married Henry Vane, 2nd Duke of Cleveland.
- The Hon. George Poulett (1786–1854), a Vice-Admiral in the Royal Navy; he married Catherine Sophia Dallas, daughter of Sir George Dallas, 1st Baronet, in 1811.
- Lady Mary Poulett (1788–1860), who married, as his second wife, Lord Charles Somerset, a younger son of Henry Somerset, 5th Duke of Beaufort.
- Hon. William Poulett (1789–1805), who died young.
- Hon. Vere Poulett (1791–1812), an Ensign in the 4th Foot who died unmarried.
- Hon. Frederic Charles Poulett (1798–1808), who died young.

After Sophia's death in January 1811 Poulett married secondly Margaret Burges, daughter of Ynyr Burges and widow of Sir John Smith-Burges, 1st Baronet, in 1816.

Lord Poulett died in January 1819, aged 62, and was succeeded in the earldom by his eldest son, John. The Countess Poulett died at Brighton on 28 May 1838.

=== Descendants ===
Through his second son George, he was a grandfather of William Poulett, 6th Earl Poulett.

Through his daughter Lady Mary, he was a grandfather of Col. Poulett Somerset, Mary Sophia Somerset, and Augusta Anne Somerset (wife of Sir Henry Barron, 1st Baronet).

Honorary titles
Preceded by The Earl of Guilford	Lord Lieutenant of Somerset; 1792–1819	Succeeded by The Marquess of Bath
Peerage of England
Preceded by Vere Poulett	Earl Poulett; 1788–1819	Succeeded by John Poulett
