= William Poulet (publisher) =

William Poulet was the pseudonym used by Jean-Paul Wayenborgh to write his History of Spectacles "Die Brille". This history was the first systematic presentation and description of more than 2000 historical spectacles from the Zeiss Collection in Oberkochen, Germany, the Hallauer Collection (Museum for the History of Medicine in Bern, Switzerland) and the Pierre Marly Collection (now Essilor Collection).

Poulet wrote further under his real name: IBBO-International Biography and Bibliography of Ophthalmologists and Vision Scientists, Wayenborgh Publishing, Ostend 2001-2002. He wrote a historical paper in the medical journal "Strabismus": J.-P. Wayenborgh Florent Cunier (1812-1852). A tragic Figure in Ophthalmic History, Strabismus, 9,177-178, Swets & Zeitlinger, Lisse 2001.

Wayenborgh is the publisher of Julius Hirschberg´s History of Ophthalmology (18 volumes) and publisher and editor of The Monographs (a supplement series to Hirschberg's History). Wayenborgh also published E.-H. Schmitz Handbuch zur Geschichte der Optik and is currently (since 2006) editing the English translation of the last named work.
