= Oriel Ross =

English actress (1907–1994)

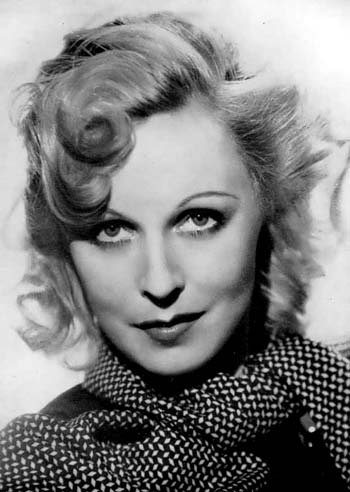
Oriel Ross

Oriel Ross (10 June 1907 – 20 October 1994), born Muriel Mary Swinstead, was an English actress. In 1933 Cecil Beaton included her in The Book of Beauty saying that she was Jacob Epstein's favorite model.

== Biography ==
Muriel Mary Swinstead was born on 10 June 1907 in Chalgrove, Oxfordshire, the daughter of John Howard Swinstead, a clergyman.

She attended the Royal College of Music and in 1923, at 16 years old, made her debut on stage in Karel Čapek's The Insect Play.

In the middle of the 1920s, Ross lived in Jacob Epstein's bohemian house in Guildford Street, London, together with his wife, mistress, children, models and followers. There are three portraits of Ross by Epstein, a bust in 1925, exhibited at the Leicester Galleries in 1926, and Epstein's 1927 New York exhibition; a head in 1926, now in a private collection, also in the 1927 New York exhibition (another cast from the head is in the collection of the Whitworth Art Gallery, Manchester); a torso in 1931/2 is now at the Museum of Modern Art, New York. A head and shoulders in 1931 sculpted out of bronze is on display at the Victoria Gallery & Museum, at the University of Liverpool. The piece was bequeathed to the University by Lord Henry Cohen.

In 1928 she appeared as Nature in Sergei Diaghilev's Ballet Ode and then went to New York, where she appeared on Broadway and in revue and cabaret.

She returned to London in 1931 and was in work throughout the 1930s and 1940s, when she was a member of Lilian Baylis's Old Vic Company.

In 1931 she appeared as Duchess in the British-German drama film The Loves of Ariane directed by Paul Czinner. In 1932 she appeared as Connie in the British musical romance film The First Mrs. Fraser directed by Thorold Dickinson and Sinclair Hill and as Catherina of Russia in the play Casanova. In 1933 she appeared as Lady Poppy in the British drama film Self Made Lady directed by George King. In 1935 she appeared as Elsie in the British crime film The Price of a Song directed by Michael Powell.

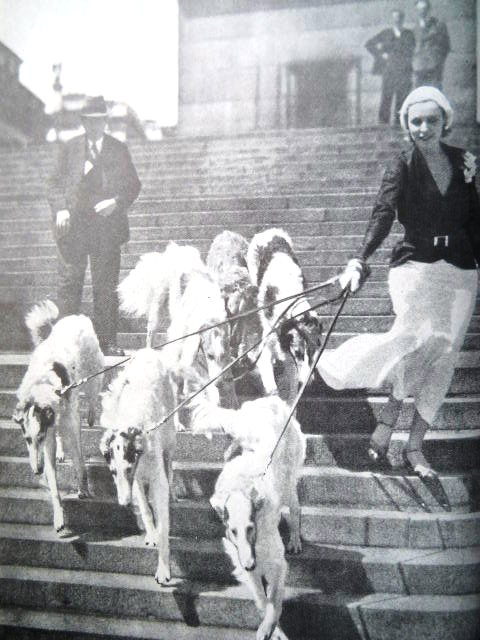
Oriel Ross, the "Catherine of Russia" in the 1932 play Casanova, exercising the Borzois that appeared on the stage with her

Oriel Ross married George Poulett, 8th Earl Poulett on 21 June 1935; they were divorced in 1941.

In 1938 she appeared in various productions: A Midsummer's Dream at Regent's Park; Helen in Troilus and Cressida at the Westminster Theatre; On a Summer Day at the Torch Theatre; Touchwood at the "Q" & Embassy Theatre; Alonzo MacTavish at the radio; and as Isolda in the television film Tristan and Isolda. In 1941 she appeared as Lady Willoughby in the British anti-Nazi thriller "Pimpernel" Smith produced and directed by its star Leslie Howard. In 1946 she appeared as Queen Isabella of Castile in the drama television film The Man with the Cloak Full of Holes. In 1952 she appeared as Madame in the first play presented in French by the Institute of Contemporary Arts, The Maids, directed by Peter Zadek.

In the 1940s actor Henry Kendall rented a maisonette in the house she owned in Ebury Street.

Ross was a talented amateur artist, making line drawings of friends and colleagues such as Jacob Epstein, the actors Elsa Lanchester and Ernest Thesiger, the gallery owner Arthur Jeffress and the composer Constant Lambert. Seven of her drawings are in the collection of the National Portrait Gallery.

She died on 20 October 1994 in Hoxne, Suffolk.
