= Geoffrey Taylour, 4th Marquess of Headfort =

Anglo-Irish politician (1878–1943)

The Most Honourable The Marquess of Headfort
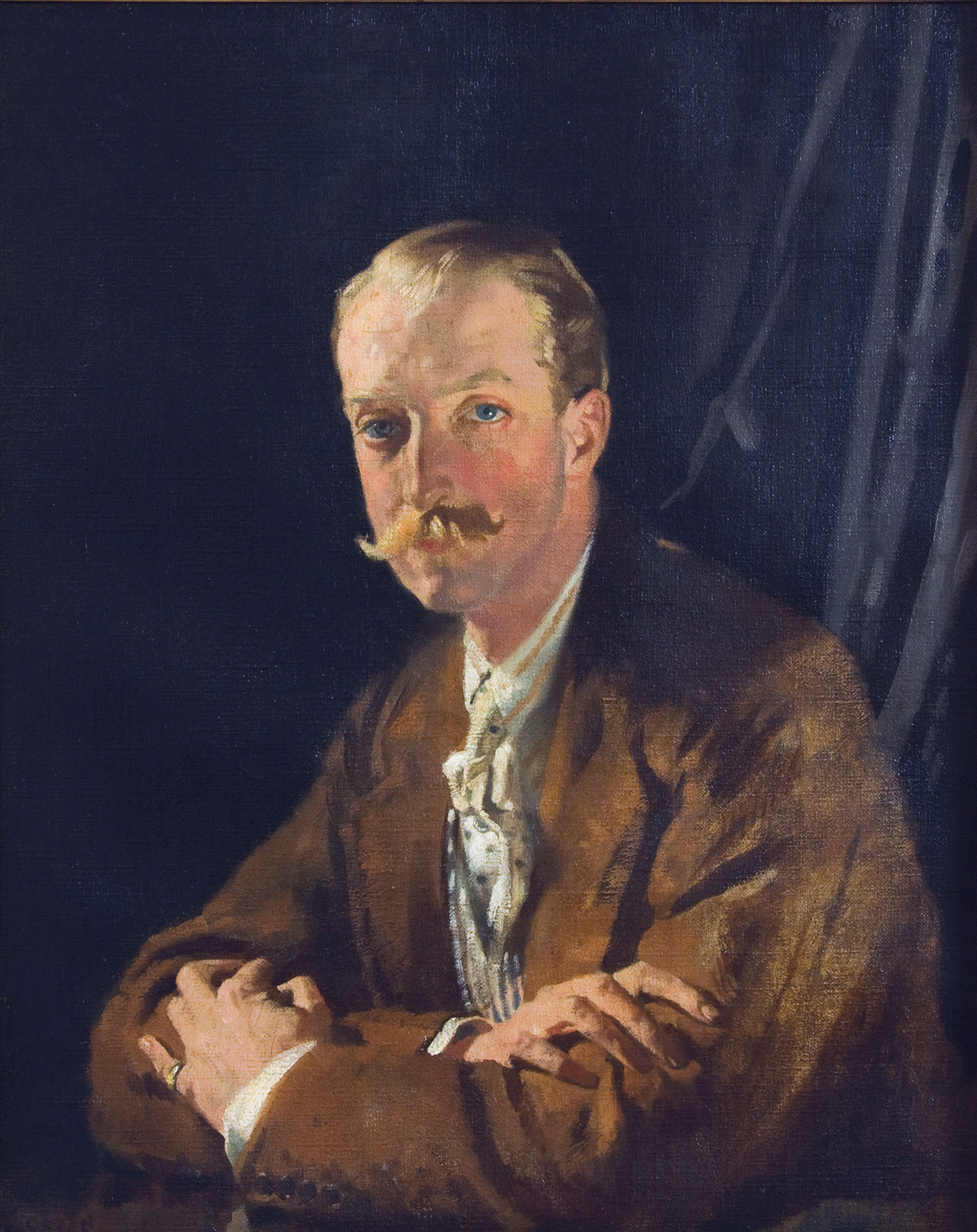
- Geoffrey Taylour, 4th Marquess of Headfort (William Orpen, 1915)

Senator
- In office 11 December 1922 – 12 December 1928

Personal details
- Born: Geoffrey Thomas Taylour; 12 June 1878
- Died: 29 January 1943 (aged 64)
- Party: Independent
- Spouse: Rosie Boote (m. 1901)
- Children: 3
- Parent: Thomas Taylour (father)

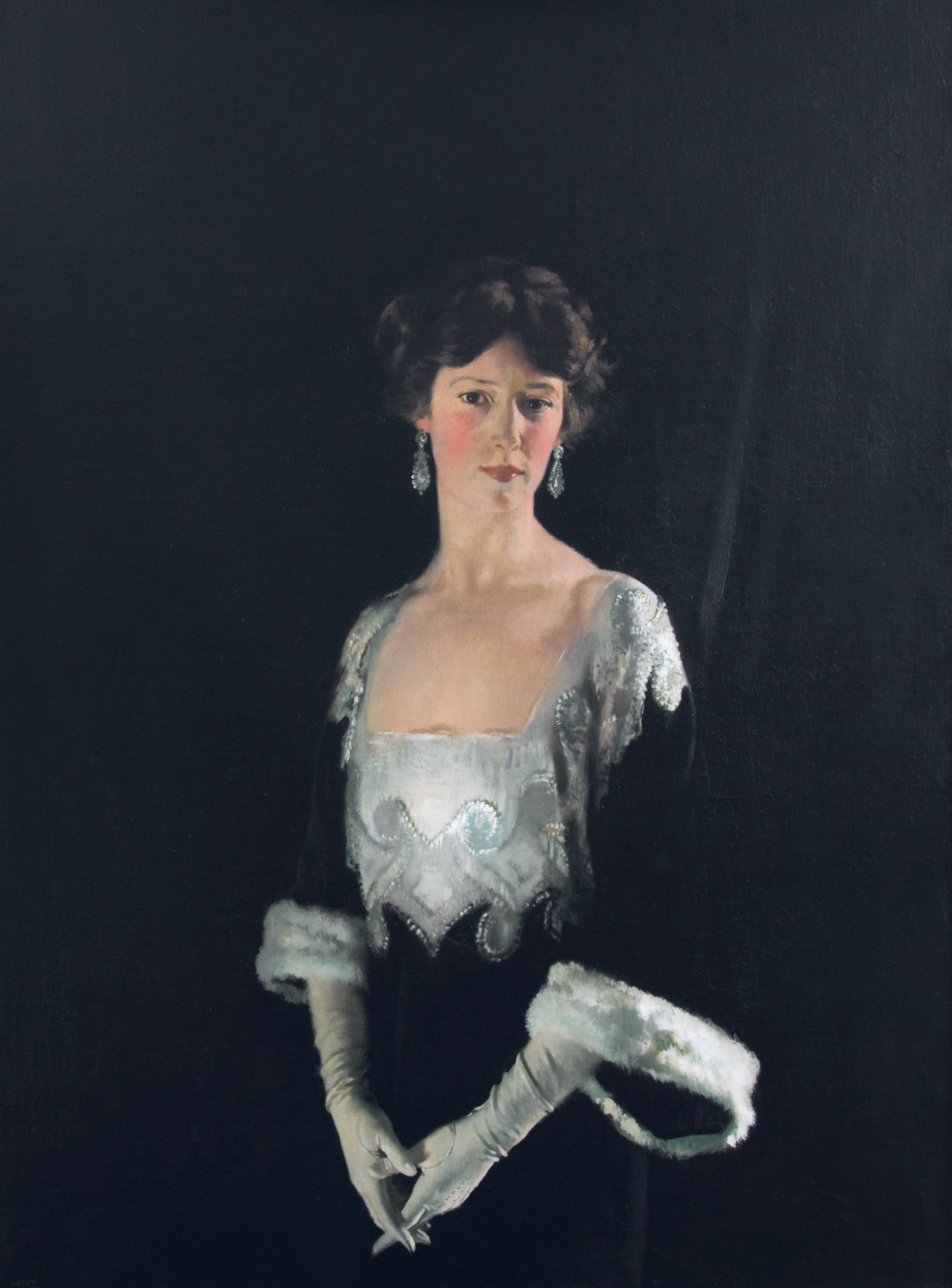
Sir William Orpen: Portrait of Rosie, Fourth Marchioness of Headfort.

Geoffrey Thomas Taylour, 4th Marquess of Headfort DL, JP, FZS (12 June 1878 – 29 January 1943), styled Lord Geoffrey Taylour until 1893 and Earl of Bective between 1893 and 1894, was a British politician and Army officer.

== Career ==
Styled Lord Geoffrey Taylour from birth, he was the son of Thomas Taylour, 3rd Marquess of Headfort, by his second wife Emily Constantia, daughter of the Reverend Lord John Thynne. He became known by the courtesy title Earl of Bective in 1893 on the death of his half-brother. The following year, aged 16, he succeeded his father in the marquessate.

Lord Headfort was commissioned a second lieutenant in the 1st Life Guards on 4 January 1899, and promoted to lieutenant on 7 March 1900. He resigned from the regiment in May 1901. In June the following year he was appointed a lieutenant in the newly created Yeomanry regiment, the 2nd County of London Yeomanry (Westminster Dragoons). He was justice of the peace and Deputy Lieutenant for county Meath, Ireland; and a Lieutenant in the Household Cavalry.

Headfort was an English Freemason, having been initiated in the Lodge of Assistance No 2773 (London, England) at Golden Square, London, in February 1901, aged 22 years.

From 1922 to 1928, Headfort served as a Senator of the Irish Free State.

Headfort was president of the Royal Horticultural Society of Ireland for thirty years from 1915 to 1943, winning the Society's Gold Medal of Honour for distinguished services to horticulture in Ireland in 1939.

== Family ==
Rosie Boote, a young singer who appeared in The Messenger Boy in 1900 under her professional name of Miss Rosie Boote, so charmed the young Marquess that he married her on 11 April 1901. Their marriage was unusual: Rose was a Catholic from a humble background, while her husband was a Protestant aristocrat. He caused a sensation when he converted to Catholicism for their marriage. They lived at Headfort House in Ireland and had three children together:

- Terence Taylour, 5th Marquess of Headfort
- Lord William Desmond Taylour, British archaeologist
- Lady Millicent Olivia Mary Taylour (9 Dec 1907 - 24 Dec 1975); married 28 April 1930 (div. 1936) to Henry Frederic Tiarks, a banker; Lady Millicent died 24 December 1975.

Peerage of Ireland
Preceded by Thomas Taylour	Marquess of Headfort; 1894–1943	Succeeded by Terence Taylour
