= John Poulett, 2nd Earl Poulett =

English peer

Arms of Poulett: Sable, three swords pilewise points in base proper pomels and hilts or

John Poulett, 2nd Earl Poulett (10 December 1708 – 5 November 1764), styled Viscount Hinton until 1743 was an English peer.

Poulett was the son of John Poulett, 1st Earl Poulett and his wife, Bridget Bertie, daughter of the Honourable Peregrine Bertie, and was educated at Taunton Grammar School. In 1734, he was summoned to parliament in his father's barony of Poulett by writ of acceleration and was a Lord of the Bedchamber until 1755. He inherited his father's earldom in 1743, was appointed Lord Lieutenant of Somerset in 1744, colonel of the 1st Somerset Militia from 1759 and was sometime recorder of Bridgwater.

Poulett died unmarried and childless in 1764 and his titles passed to his brother, Vere. He also had a younger twin brother, Peregrine Poulett, a member of parliament died in 1752.

Honorary titles
Preceded by The Lord Melcombe	Lord Lieutenant of Somerset; 1744–1764	Succeeded by The Earl of Thomond
Peerage of England
Preceded by John Poulett	Earl Poulett; 1743–1764	Succeeded by Vere Poulett
Preceded by John Poulett	Baron Poulett (writ of acceleration); 1734–1764	Succeeded by Vere Poulett
