= John Poulett, 5th Earl Poulett =

English peer and militia officer

Arms of Poulett: Sable, three swords pilewise points in base proper pomels and hilts or

Colonel John Poulett, 5th Earl Poulett (5 July 1783 – 1864), styled Viscount Hinton from 1788 to 1819, was an English peer and militia officer.

Educated at Harrow and Brasenose College, Oxford, Hinton was commissioned a captain in the 1st Somerset Militia in 1801. His father was made colonel of that regiment in 1803, and on 20 September 1804, Hinton himself became colonel of the 2nd Somerset Militia, and was appointed a deputy lieutenant of Somerset on 10 January 1805.

Upon the death of his father in January 1819, he succeeded to the title of Earl Poulett, and also succeeded his father as colonel of the 1st Somersetshire Militia. He commanded the regiment until 1852, when he was succeeded by his son Vere Poulett, Viscount Hinton.

Poulett married Frances Charlotte, daughter of Henry Berkeley Portman, on 21 August 1820, by whom he had three sons, all of whom predeceased him:

- John Rolle Poulett, Viscount Hinton (8 June 1821 – 18 August 1843), Grenadier Guards
- Col. Vere Poulett, Viscount Hinton (20 August 1822 – 29 August 1857), served in the Somersetshire Militia
- Lady Margaret Charlotte Poulett (16 July 1830 – 31 May 1834)
- Hon. Amias Poulett (6 February 1835 – 20 February 1857), Grenadier Guards

He was succeeded in the peerage by his nephew, William Henry Poulett (1827–1899), who was the third son of his younger brother, Admiral the Hon. George Poulett.

Peerage of England
Preceded by John Poulett	Earl Poulett; 1819–1864	Succeeded by William Poulett
