= Poulette =

Poulette may refer to:

- HMS Poulette, two Royal Navy ships
- Michel Poulette, Canadian film and television director, writer and producer
