= William Poulett, 7th Earl Poulett =

English peer and British Army officer

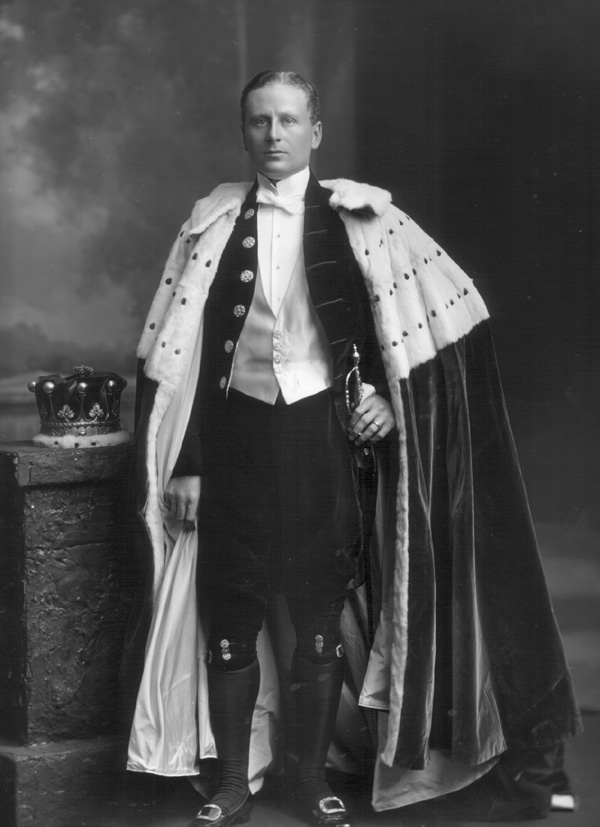
Lord Poulett in coronation robes, 1911

William John Lydston Poulett, 7th Earl Poulett (11 September 1883 – 11 July 1918) was an English peer and British Army officer.

== Biography ==
Educated at Cheltenham College and Trinity Hall, Cambridge, he was the son of William Poulett, 6th Earl Poulett, by his third wife, Rosa, a daughter of Alfred Hugh de Melville.

He was known by the courtesy title of Viscount Hinton until on the death of his father in 1899 when he inherited the earldom of Poulett and an estate at Hinton St George, Somerset, centering on Hinton House. However, the inheritance of the earldom was disputed by William Turnour Thomas Poulett, a son of his father's first wife, whom the 6th Earl believed had been fathered by another man. On 27 July 1903, on a report from the Committee of Privileges, the House of Lords determined the dispute in favour of William John Lydston Poulett, as the undisputed son of the 6th Earl.

In 1908 Lord Poulett married Sylvia Lilian Storey, the daughter of Fred Storey, an actor, dancer, and scene-painter. The bride was herself an actress and Gaiety Girl. They had one son, George Amias FitzWarrine Poullet, Viscount Hinton (1909–1973), and one daughter, Lady Bridget Elizabeth Felicia Henrietta Augusta Poulett (1912–1978).

Poulett was commissioned as a second lieutenant into the Royal Welch Fusiliers and transferred to the Royal Horse Artillery. He died on 11 July 1918 of Spanish influenza and was succeeded by his eight-year-old son, George Poulett, Viscount Hinton. After his death, his widow became engaged to Major Percy Howard Hansen, but the marriage never took place, which was thought to be because of the financial consequences for the Countess. However, she had a daughter with Hansen, Phoebe Amie Sybil Poulett (born 1922), who died unmarried in 1948.

== Notes ==
Peerage of England
Preceded by William Poulett	Earl Poulett; 1899–1918	Succeeded by George Poulett
