= Hinton House =

Country house in Hinton St George, Somerset, England

Coordinates: 50.908°N 2.829°W

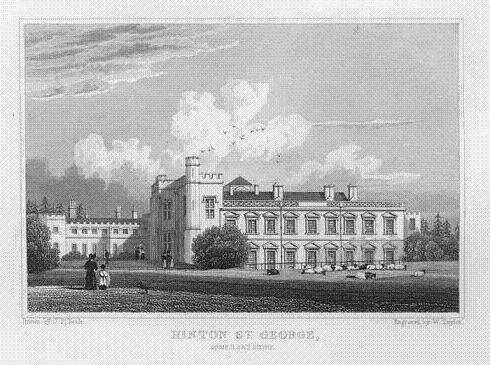
Hinton House c. 1800

Hinton House is a large country house near Hinton St George in Somerset, England.

== History ==
The house started life as a medieval hall house and was rebuilt around 1500 by Sir Amias Paulet. Alterations were made for successive Lords Poulett by Matthew Brettingham, John Soane, James Wyatt, and Jeffry Wyattville. The Tower House was added around 1814.

The design of the south front is based on Inigo Jones's Banqueting House in Whitehall. The South Range is Grade II* listed.

The former stable block which was built in the late 18th century, designed by John Soane, is also a Grade II listed building.

Immediately south of the main house is a sunken garden, surrounded by low open balustrading.

During the Second World War, the house was used by the St Felix School for Girls, evacuated from Felixstowe. The estate was broken up in August 1968, when it was sold by the childless 8th and last Earl Poulett. The house itself was divided into several flats.
