= John Poulett, 1st Earl Poulett =

British politician and courtier (c. 1668 – 1743)

The Right Honourable The Earl Poulett KG
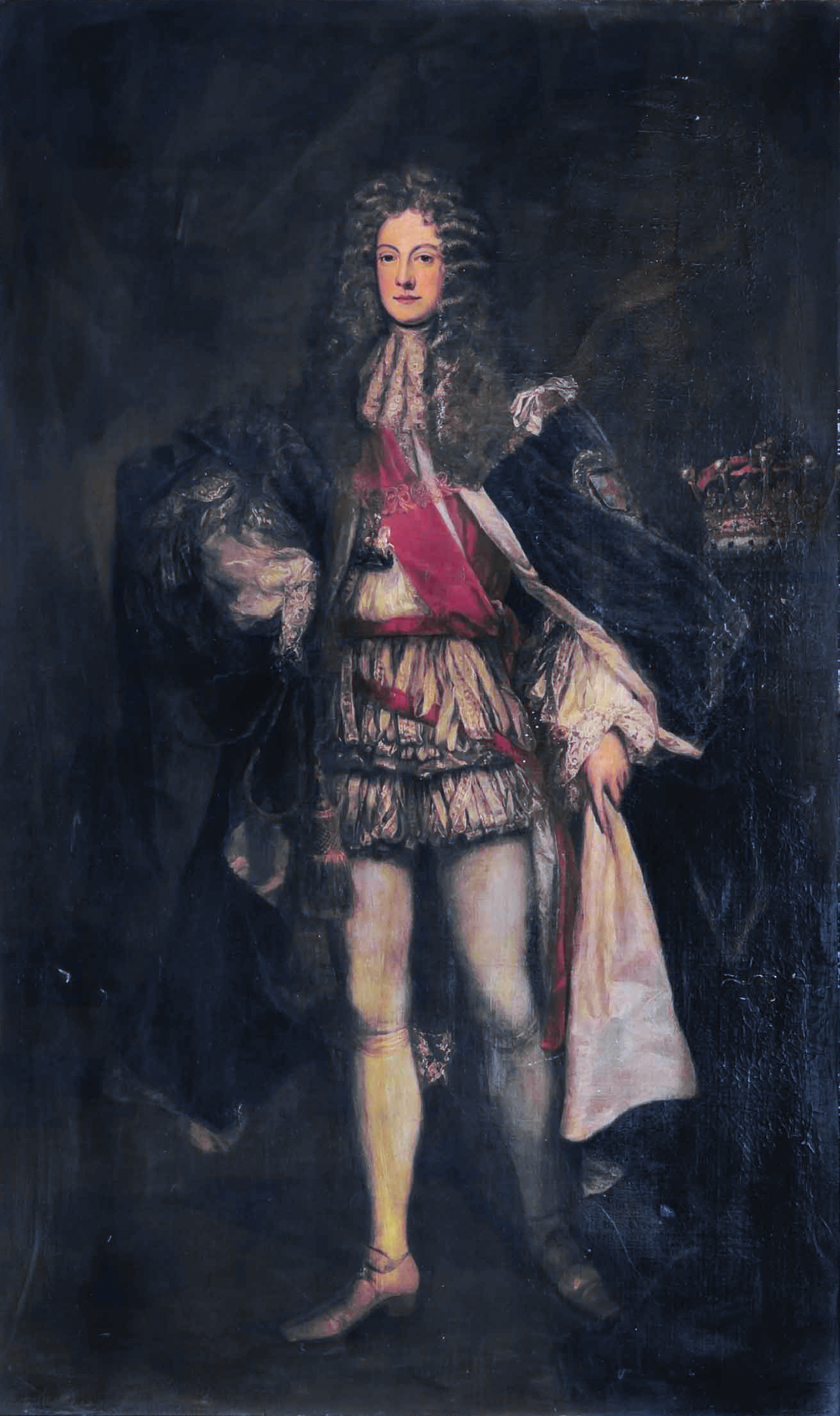
- Portrait of Poulett, (circle of Godfrey Kneller)

First Lord of the Treasury
- In office 11 August 1710 – 30 May 1711
- Monarch: Anne
- Preceded by: The Earl of Godolphin as Lord High Treasurer
- Succeeded by: The Earl of Oxford and Earl Mortimer as Lord High Treasurer

Lord Steward
- In office 11 June 1711 – 24 September 1714
- Monarchs: Anne; George I
- Preceded by: The Duke of Buckingham and Normanby
- Succeeded by: The Duke of Devonshire

Personal details
- Born: John Poulett c. 1668
- Died: 28 May 1743
- Spouse: Bridget Bertie
- Children: 8, including John, Peregrine, Vere, and Anne
- Parent(s): John Poulett, 3rd Baron Poulett; Susan Herbert

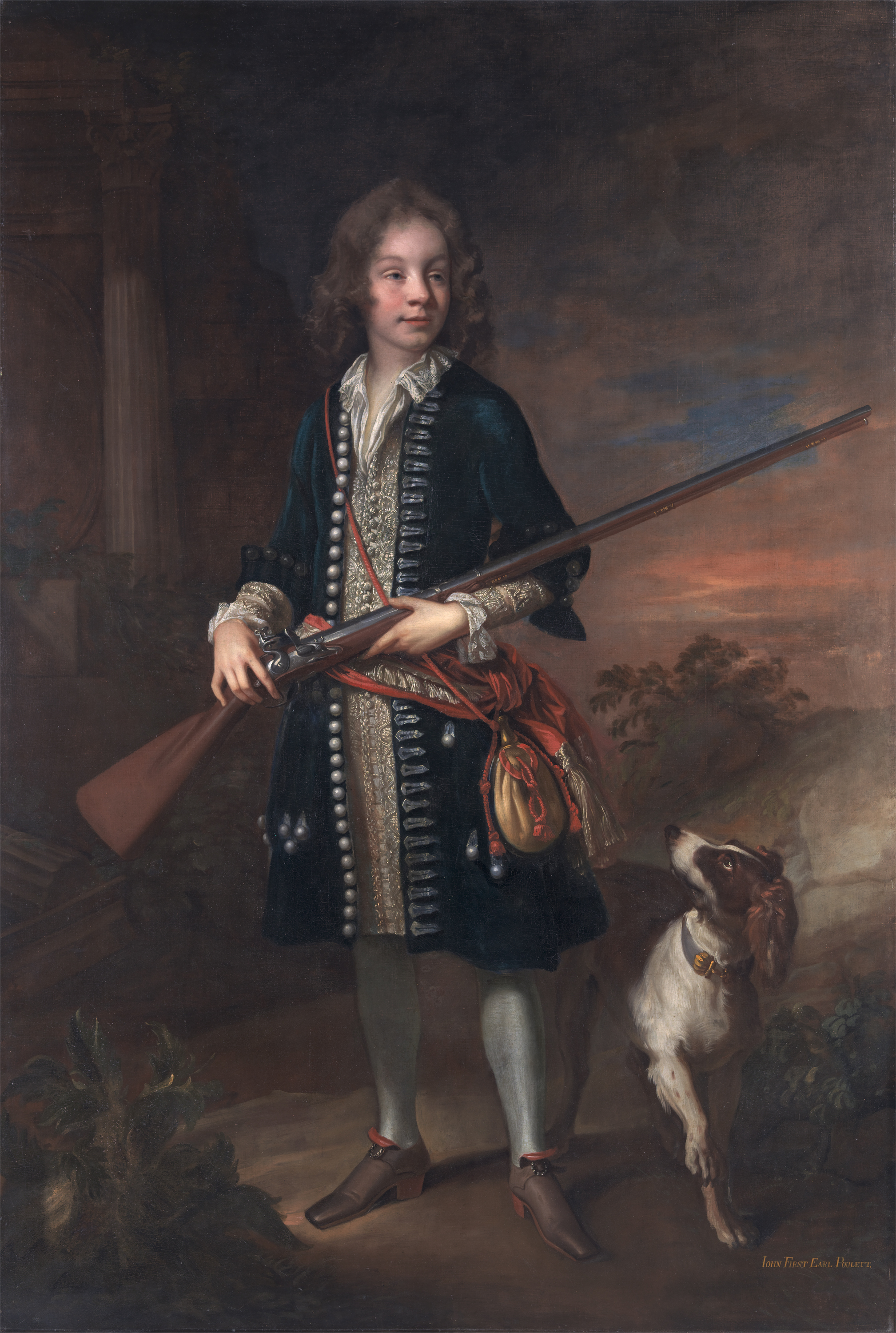
Portrait of Poulett as a boy by John Closterman

John Poulett, 1st Earl Poulett, KG (c. 1668 – 28 May 1743) was a British politician and courtier.

== Life ==
Poulett was the son of John Poulett, 3rd Baron Poulett and his second wife, Susan Herbert, daughter of Philip Herbert, 5th Earl of Pembroke. He was the most constant patron of Thomas Gibson, a leading 18th-century artist.

== Marriage & children ==
On 14 April 1702, he married Bridget Bertie, a granddaughter of Montagu Bertie, 2nd Earl of Lindsey, by whom he had several children:

- John Poulett, 2nd Earl Poulett (1708–1764), eldest son and heir;
- Peregrine Poulett (d. 1752) MP for Bridgwater;
- Vere Poulett, 3rd Earl Poulett (1710–1788);
- Anne Poulett (1711–1785);
- Bridget (1702–1773), m. Pollexfen Bastard; paternal grandparents of John Pollexfen Bastard;
- Catherine Poulett (d. 1758), mother of John Parker, 1st Baron Boringdon (1735–1788), of Saltram, Devon;
- Susannah Poulett (d. 1788);
- Rebecca Poulett (d. 1765).

Political offices
Preceded by The Earl of Godolphin (as Lord High Treasurer)	First Lord of the Treasury; 1710–1711	Succeeded by The Earl of Oxford and Earl Mortimer (as Lord High Treasurer)
Preceded by The Duke of Buckingham and Normanby	Lord Steward; 1711–1714	Succeeded by The Duke of Devonshire
Honorary titles
Preceded by The Earl of Stamford	Lord Lieutenant of Devon; 1702–1714	Succeeded by Sir William Courtenay, Bt
Preceded by The Earl of Stamford	Custos Rotulorum of Devon; 1711–1714	Succeeded by Sir William Courtenay, Bt
Preceded by The Viscount Fitzhardinge	Custos Rotulorum of Somerset; 1713–1714	Succeeded by The Earl of Orrery
Peerage of England
New creation	Earl Poulett; 1706–1743	Succeeded by John Poulett
Preceded by John Poulett	Baron Poulett (descended by acceleration); 1679–1734	Succeeded by John Poulett
