= Earl Poulett =

Title in the Peerage of England

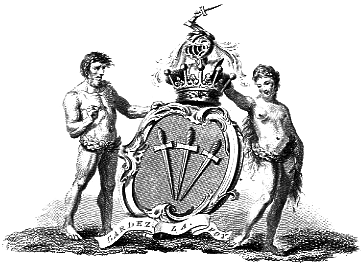
Arms of the Earls Poulett with motto beneath: Gardez la foi (meaning: keep the faith)

Earl Poulett (pronounced "Paulett") was a title in the Peerage of England. It was created in 1706 for John Poulett, 4th Baron Poulett. The Poulett family descended from Sir Anthony Paulet, son of Sir Amias Paulet, who served as Governor of Jersey and as Captain of the Guard to Queen Elizabeth I. The ancestral family seat was Hinton House in the village of Hinton St George, Somerset.

His eldest son Sir John Poulett represented Somerset and Lyme Regis in the House of Commons. In 1627 he was raised to the Peerage of England as Baron Poulett, of Hinton St George in the County of Somerset. Lord Poulett later supported the Royalist cause in the Civil War.

The first Baron's son, John Poulett (1615–1665) was a Member of Parliament for Stamford and fought as a Royalist Officer in the Civil War. On his father's death in 1649 he succeeded as second baron.

His son, the third Baron, represented Somerset in Parliament and also served as Lord-Lieutenant of Dorset. He was succeeded by his son, the fourth Baron, a commissioner for the Treaty of Union with the Kingdom of Scotland. In 1706 he was created Viscount Hinton St George and Earl Poulett in the Peerage of England. Lord Poulett later served as First Lord of the Treasury and as Lord Steward of the Household.

When he died, the titles passed to his eldest son, the second Earl. He had already been summoned to the House of Lords as Lord Poulett in his father's lifetime and also served as Lord-Lieutenant of Somerset. He died unmarried and was succeeded by his younger brother, the third Earl, who had previously sat as a Member of Parliament for Bridgwater and served as Lord-Lieutenant of Devon.

The third Earl's son, the fourth Earl, was Lord-Lieutenant of Somerset. He was succeeded by his eldest son, the fifth Earl.

On the death of the 5th Earl, whose sons had all pre-deceased him, the titles passed to his nephew, the sixth Earl. He was the third son of Vice-Admiral the Hon. George Poulett, second son of the fourth Earl. The sixth earl was heavily involved in steeplechasing as a racehorse owner whose cerise and blue colours were most famed for being carried to victory twice in the Grand National, in 1868 and 1871, by a horse called The Lamb.

On the death of the 6th Earl, a dispute arose (see below), and the outcome was that the earldom and other titles were awarded to the 6th Earl's son by his third wife, who became the seventh Earl Poulett. He fought in the First World War as a captain in the Royal Horse Artillery and died of influenza in 1918. He was succeeded by his only son, the eighth Earl, who was brought up by his mother, a former actress, and after Eton trained as a railway engineer. Although three times married, he was childless, and on his death in 1973 all his titles became extinct. Since both the 8th Earl and his sister Lady Bridget Poulett were childless, in 1968 the 8th and last Earl Poulett sold the Hinton estate, after which he and his wife settled in Jersey, Channel Islands. Perhaps he recalled that three of his Poulett ancestors had been Governor of Jersey in the 16th century.

Lady Bridget Poulett (1912–1978), the only sibling of the 8th and last Earl, was a 'Society Beauty' of the 1930s.

== Disputed descent of earldom ==
On the sixth Earl's death in 1899, a dispute arose over the succession to his titles.

A son, William Turnour Thomas Poulett, had been born to the 6th Earl's first wife, Elizabeth Lavinia, in 1849, while they were married, but although his wife insisted he was the child's father, Captain Poulett (as he then was) had reason to believe the child had been fathered by another man, Captain William Turnour Granville, after whom his mother named him. Until a son was born in 1883, he had no son he believed to be his own, yet treated W. T. T. Poulett as his son. Thus in 1875, W. T. T. Poulett was living at the family's secondary estate, Grenville Hall, Droxford, under the courtesy title of Viscount Hinton. However, after the birth of William John Lydston Poulett he was disowned.

Following the 6th Earl's death, the Poulett earldom and its entailed estates were claimed by W. T. T. Poulett, but this was challenged on the grounds of paternity, and on 27 July 1903, on a report from its Committee of Privileges steered by the Judicial Committee of the House of Lords, the House determined the dispute in favour of the 6th Earl's fifteen-year-old son, William John Lydston Poulett. The House of Lords rejected the doctrine of pater est quem nuptiae demonstrant – a child born within wedlock is lawfully fathered by its mother's husband.

The facts and outcome heavily contrast with the allegedly summons-entitled Earls of Banbury (before the House of Lords Act 1999) where the paternity evidence was no mention of the title-inheriting sons in a will, so that family no longer received any summons to the House.

In 1869, while he was known as Viscount Hinton, W. T. T. Poulett married Lydia Ann Shippy (a.k.a. Anne Sheppey) and had had one son, William Henry George Poulett (born 1 April 1870). In a fortunate turn of events, in 1901 Wilhelmina Powlett, Duchess of Cleveland, the widow of a distant kinsman of the 6th Earl's, left W. H. G. Poulett a bequest of £5,000 in her Will, and he became a tea-planter in Ceylon.

== Barons Poulett (1627) ==
- John Poulett, 1st Baron Poulett (1585–1649)
- John Poulett, 2nd Baron Poulett (1615–1665)
- John Poulett, 3rd Baron Poulett (1641–1679)
- John Poulett, 4th Baron Poulett (1663–1743) (created Earl Poulett in 1706)

== Earls Poulett (1706) ==
- John Poulett, 1st Earl Poulett (1663–1743)
- John Poulett, 2nd Earl Poulett (1708–1764)
- Vere Poulett, 3rd Earl Poulett (1710–1788)
- John Poulett, 4th Earl Poulett (1756–1819)
- John Poulett, 5th Earl Poulett (1783–1864)
- William Henry Poulett, 6th Earl Poulett (1827–1899)
- William John Lydston Poulett, 7th Earl Poulett (1883–1918)
- George Amias Fitzwarrine Poulett, 8th Earl Poulett (1909–1973)

== Arms ==
Arms of Poulett

The arms of the head of the Poulett family are blazoned Sable, three swords pilewise points in base proper pomels and hilts or.
