= Elizabeth Moleyns =

English courtier

Elizabeth Moleyns (born 1563) was an English courtier.

She was the daughter of Sir Thomas Southwell (d. 1568) of Woodrising, Norfolk and his third wife Nazareth Newton. She was a half-sister of Vice Admiral Robert Southwell.

Elizabeth Southwell was a Maid of Honour to Queen Elizabeth.

There may be some confusion among ladies in waiting to Elizabeth and Anne of Denmark called "Mistress Southwell", including her niece Elizabeth Southwell who ran away from court and married Robert Dudley. This Mistress Southwell came to court in January 1600, as a replacement for Margaret Radclyffe, and Rowland Whyte noted she would be sworn in as a maid of honour, "My Lady Newton having sought it for her daughter". (Nazareth Newton was her aunt, not her mother). Elizabeth Dudley's mother was another "Mistress Southwell" at court, Elizabeth Howard, Countess of Carrick, the widow of Elizabeth Moleyns' brother Sir Robert Southwell.

Southwell was a mistress of Robert Devereux, 2nd Earl of Essex and in 1591 mother of Walter Devereux. Her pregnancy and absence from court was disguised as a "lameness in her leg". For a while Thomas Vavasour pretended to be the father, to protect the reputation of the queen's favourite, but Queen Elizabeth discovered the facts in May 1595.

She married Sir Barentine or Barantyne Moleyns of Clapcot near Wallingford in 1599. Moleyns, who was younger than his wife, was said to be notorious for his ugliness and was a veteran soldier weakened by his injuries.

Rowland Whyte mentioned that "Lady Moleyns, she that was Mistress Southwell, the maid" came to the christening of Barbara Sidney, daughter of Sir Robert Sidney and Barbara Gamage, in December 1599 in the company of Anne St John, Lady Effingham.

She had a son, Michael Molyns.
