= Elizabeth Howard, Countess of Carrick =

English aristocrat and courtier

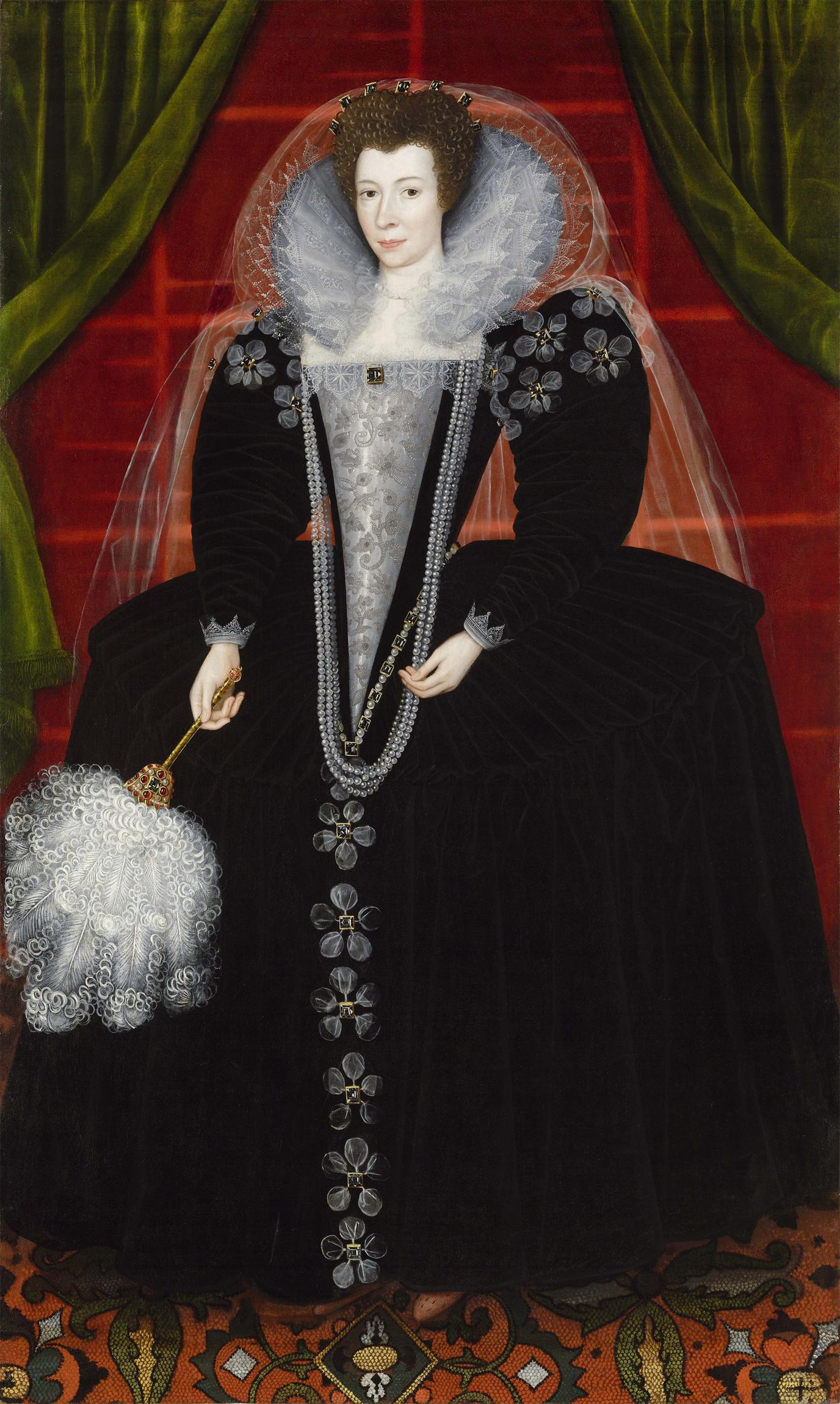
Portrait thought to be Elizabeth Southwell as a widow in 1600, or Elizabeth Trentham, Countess of Oxford.

Elizabeth Howard (1563—1646) was an English aristocrat and courtier to Elizabeth I of England.

== Career ==
She was a daughter of Charles Howard, 1st Earl of Nottingham and Catherine Carey.

She was a maid of honour and lady in waiting to Queen Elizabeth I, as was her sister Frances Howard, Countess of Kildare. As a New Year's Day gift in January 1572, Queen Elizabeth gave her a red and white rose jewel that had been given to her by Blanche Parry.

She married Robert Southwell (1563—12 October 1598) of Woodrising, Norfolk, on 17 April 1583. He was the son of Thomas Southwell and his second wife Mary Mansell, a daughter of Rice Mansel (1487–1559).

Thomas Southwell had a daughter with his third wife Nazareth Newton (d. 1583), another Elizabeth Southwell, who was a Maid of Honour to Queen Elizabeth. She was a mistress of Robert Devereux, 2nd Earl of Essex and mother of Walter Devereux, who married Sir Barentine Moleyns or Molyns of Clapcot.

After Robert Southwell's death in October 1598 Elizabeth Howard was left "a rich widow", and there was a rumour she would marry Sir William Woodhouse of Waxham, a cousin of her fellow courtier Lady Walsingham.

She became a lady of the Privy Chamber to Anne of Denmark in 1603. Her daughter, Elizabeth Southwell, was also a maid of honour to Anna of Denmark. A letter of the Earl of Worcester describing the household in 1604 mentioned that "of late the Lady Sothwell [is] for the drawing chamber". After 1608 her daughters Frances and Katherine were gentlewomen of the Privy Chamber. A "Mrs Southwell", who made an unsuccessful trip to meet the queen in Scotland in May 1603, mentioned in the letters of Captain John Skinner from Berwick-upon-Tweed, was Anne Southwell, an author, the wife of a Sir Thomas Southwell.

"Southwell the elder" was one of queen's ladies "taken out" of the audience to dance on 1 January 1604 at Hampton Court during The Masque of Indian and China Knights.

In October 1604 she married Sir John Stewart, a son of Robert Stewart, 1st Earl of Orkney, at Chelsea. In a letter of 1605 to the Earl of Salisbury she identifies her husband as the brother of the Master of Orkney. John Stewart became Lord Kinclaven in 1607, and Earl of Carrick in 1628.

She walked in procession at the funeral of Anne of Denmark in 1619, listed as "Lady Kencleven".

She died in 1646 and was buried at Greenwich.

Christopher Sutton, rector of Woodrising dedicated his Disce Mori (1600) and Disce Vivere (?1604) to Lady Southwell, and his Godly Meditations on the Most Holy Sacrament (1613) to her daughters Frances and Katherine.

Portraits of Elizabeth Howard, her mother Catherine Carey, and her daughter Elizabeth Southwell were included in a sale at Cowdray Park in 2011.

== Family ==
Her children included;

- Charles Southwell (2 February 1588 - 23 April 1588), buried at Reigate where the Howard family lived at Reigate Priory.
- Thomas Southwell (1598-1643), married Margaret Fuller.
- Elizabeth Southwell (1584-1631), maid of honour to Queen Elizabeth in 1599 to replace Margaret Ratcliffe. She danced in the masque at the marriage of Henry Somerset, 1st Marquess of Worcester in June 1600. She was also maid of honour to Anne of Denmark, and third wife of Robert Dudley. She wrote an account of the death of Queen Elizabeth. She was buried in San Pancrazio, Florence where there was formerly a Latin inscription including her age, 37 years. Her portrait is drawn in an Italian armorial.
- Frances Southwell, gentlewoman of the privy chamber to Anne of Denmark, married Sir Edward Rodney of Rodney Stoke, Somerset, at Denmark House in 1614. The Earl of Rutland gave a wedding present of a gilt bowl and cover worth £21.
- Katherine Southwell, gentlewoman of the Privy Chamber to Anne of Denmark, who married Greville Verney, 7th Baron Willoughby de Broke in 1618.
- Robert Southwell.
- Margaret Stewart, married Sir Matthew Mennes of Sandwich.
