= Frances Southwell =

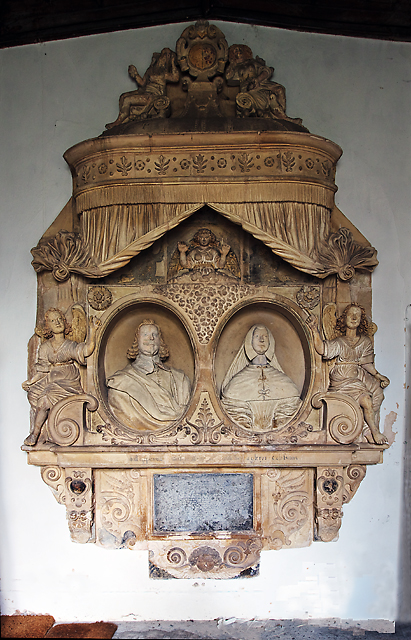
Monument to Edward Rodney and Frances Rodney née Southwell at the Church of St Leonard, Rodney Stoke

Frances Southwell (died 1659) was an English courtier.

== Career ==
She was a daughter of Sir Robert Southwell of Woodrising, Norfolk, and Elizabeth Howard.

She was a gentlewoman of the Privy Chamber to Anne of Denmark, the wife of James VI and I. Her sisters Elizabeth Southwell and Katherine Southwell, later Lady Verney, were also members of the queen's household. Francis and Katherine Southwell were given mourning clothes on the death of Prince Henry in 1612.

Christopher Sutton dedicated the 1600 edition of his Disce Mori to Frances' mother, and the 1613 edition to "the two virtuous modest gentlewoman, Mistress Katherine and Mistress Frances Southwell, sisters attending upon the Queen's Majesty in her honourable privy chamber". He omitted to mention Elizabeth Southwell who had left the court in disguise and contracted a doubtful marriage with Robert Dudley abroad.

In December 1618, Frances Southwell wrote a note to Ralph Dison a keeper of Oatlands Palace, requesting a group of six paintings with religious subjects which Anne of Denmark wanted to display in a gallery at Hampton Court.

Frances died in 1659 and was buried at the Church of St Leonard, Rodney Stoke, where there is a wall monument including the portraits of her and her husband in low relief.

== Marriage and children ==
She married Edward Rodney (d. 1651) of Rodney Stoke, Somerset, at Denmark House in 1614. Anne of Denmark had visited Rodney Stoke in 1613 during her progress to Bath and Bristol. The Earl of Rutland gave a wedding present of a gilt bowl and cover worth £21. Their children included:

- George Rodney (1629-1651)
- Penelope Rodney, who married Peter Glenne
- Anne Rodney, who married Sir Thomas Brydges of Keynsham, and was the mother of George Rodney Brydges
- Elizabeth Rodney (d. 1683), married Charles Howard

Another member of the family, George Rodney, married Anne Lake Cecil, Lady Ros in 1621, and she is also buried at St Leonards.
