= Mary Radcliffe (courtier) =

Mary Radcliffe or Ratcliffe (1550-1617) was a courtier of Queen Elizabeth I of England.

Radcliffe was born around 1550 in Elstow, Bedfordshire, one of four daughters and two sons of landowner and Member of Parliament Sir Humphrey Radcliffe and his wife Isabella Harvey.

== Life at court ==
She became a Maid of Honour at court in 1561. Her father, Humphrey Radcliffe, is said to have "presented" her to Elizabeth on 1 January 1561 as if she were a New Year's Day gift. She is sometimes confused with her younger cousin, another maid of honour, Margaret Ratcliffe (d. 1599), since both were known as "Mistress Radcliffe".

She had a stipend or wage of £40 yearly. In November 1565 she and the other maids were given gowns made by the queen's tailor Walter Fyshe of yellow satin with green velvet edges and chevrons, with silver lace, for the wedding of Ambrose, Earl of Warwick and Anne Russell. Similarly, in 1572 she and ten other maids and ladies of the chamber were given identical gowns made from crimson velvet, blue taffeta, with watchet blue silk lace.

On 25 November 1593 she spoke to Anthony Standen at Windsor Castle and told him the queen would give him an audience if he waited at the castle.

As a New Year's day gift for 1600 she gave the queen a "round kirtle of white China damask bound about with passamayne lace." "Passamayne" was a kind of braid or woven lace, used on fringes of skirts or bed curtains.

Rowland Whyte, writing in the 1590s, usually called her "old Mrs Radcliffe." Whyte noted that on 27 February 1598 a "Mrs Radcliffe" wore a white satin gown, all embroidered, richly cut on good cloth of silver, which cost £180. This was the maid of honour Margaret Radcliffe, a rival with the recently widowed Frances Howard for the affections of Lord Cobham.

In 1599 it was rumored she would retire after close to 40 years in service to the queen and be replaced by Elizabeth Southwell, daughter of Sir Robert Southwell and Elizabeth Howard, but for unknown reasons she remained in her post until Queen Elizabeth died in 1603. Southwell joined the court as a replacement for Margaret Ratcliffe, who died in November 1599.

At Sir Thomas Egerton's Harefield Entertainment in 1602, in the lottery she was given a pair of bracelets, and this verse was addressed to her, "Lady your hands are fallen in a snare: For Cupid's manacles these bracelets are."

== Radcliffe and the Queen's jewels and hoods ==
As a lady of the privy chamber, Radcliffe was in charge of the queen's jewelry from 1587, in succession to Blanche Parry, and was usually described as "Mistress Mary Radcliffe." The jewel known as the "Three Brethren" was placed in her keeping, among 628 jewels inventoried by Parry.

Radcliffe never married; she and Blanche Parry were the only gentlewomen attending Elizabeth I that shared the queen's famed virginity. Both Radcliffe and Blanche Parry were involved in making and maintaining headresses and veils for Elizabeth. In January 1570, Radcliffe was given black velvet and white satin to make "hoddes and habilliamentes", and in 1571, Radcliffe received fours of satin to line "crippens and habilliamentes". The word "biliment" was used for the strips of fabric at the front of a French hood and also the jewelled gold decorations. Radcliffe made biliments for Queen Elizabeth's hoods from white satin.

Radcliffe's name appears frequently in the lists of New Year's Day gifts given to the queen, for taking receipt of jewels. On 29 June 1600 she took receipt of a jewel from Sir Thomas Egerton, which his late wife Elizabeth had borrowed. The piece was made of gold, and enamelled with five large diamonds and a pendant pearl. In July 1600 an inventory was made of the wardrobe and jewels of Queen Elizabeth. Radcliffe had custody of several suites of gold buttons, set with diamonds, rubies, or pearls, some called "true loves" or in "pea's cod" form or made like tortoises. There were several brooches or pendants, one with hands holding a sword and trowel or spade, an emblem for peace. Radcliffe also kept a pair of sleeves and a stomacher of cloth of silver embroidered with pearls. Radcliffe was still responsible for these jewels in on 28 May 1603.

On 13 May 1603 Radcliffe and Lady Katherine Howard were asked to sort and place the old queen's jewels in orderly form at Whitehall Palace. They were to examine the jewels "which are upon dressings", used on Elizabeth's head attires. On 20 May Auditor Gofton and others were asked to examine the jewels and inventories in her custody, selecting those suitable to be retained as crown jewels. She was given a "discharge" or receipt for jewels formerly in her custody on 26 August.

On 12 January 1604, the goldsmiths John Spilman and William Herrick were asked to assess and make an inventory of the jewels that had belonged to Queen Elizabeth. King James had already given several pieces to Anne of Denmark, Princess Elizabeth, Arbella Stuart and to ambassadors as gifts at Christmas. The remaining jewels were transferred from the keeping of Mrs Mary Radcliffe to the Countess of Suffolk.

Spilman and Herrick had already accepted Radcliffe's instructions to repair some jewels, presumably from the late queen's collection. These included; a branch of tree with a half moon, set with diamonds, "ballas", rubies and pearls; a branch with an opal, an opal ring to be enamelled black; two gold bodkins; a gold feather jewel set with rubies, emeralds, and pearls; five gold buttons set with pearls; and a ring "enamelled in fashion like crayfish" with a large diamond, to be enlarged for King James.

== Later life ==
Radcliffe drew up her will in November 1617, which showed her as living in the parish of St Martin-in-the-Fields in the City of Westminster. She died sometime between November 1617 and July 1618, when her will was proved, and was buried in an unknown parish.

The sitter of a portrait at Denver Art Museum is sometimes identified as "Mary Radclyffe", a daughter of Sir John Ratcliffe of Ordsall and a daughter-in-law of Sir John Stanhope of Elvaston. This woman was a younger contemporary of Elizabeth's maid of honour.
