= Molyns =

Molyns is a surname. Notable people with the surname include:

- Michael Molyns (born 1602), English politician
- Michael Molyns (died 1615), English politician
