= Nicholas Stallinge =

English courtier

Nicholas Stallinge or Stallenge (d. 1605) was an English courtier.

He was a gentleman usher to Queen Elizabeth and King James.

His lands were at Kenn and Yatton in Somerset.

In 1586 he visited Mary, Queen of Scots at Chartley and Fotheringhay and reported on her custody by Amias Paulet. Paulet was grateful for his help but attributed improvements in his allowance to Francis Walsingham.

He died on 10 January 1605 and was buried at Kenn.

== Marriage and children ==
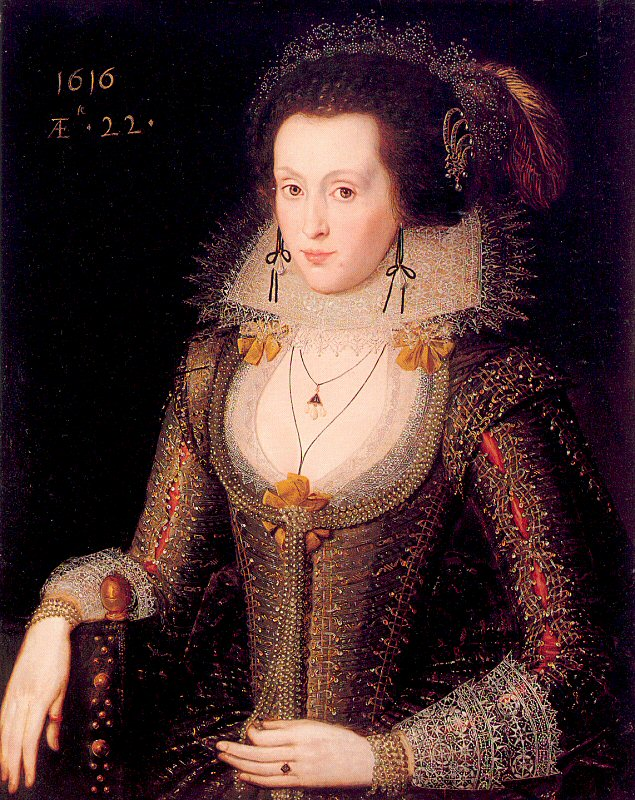
Elizabeth Poullet, daughter of Florence Stallinge, Robert Peake the Elder, Denver Art Museum

He married Florence Stallinge (d. 1620), widow of Christopher Kenn of Kenn (d. 1593), and daughter of John Stallinge, on 14 September 1593. She was said to have been a gentlewoman and a servant to Kenn before her marriage. They had no children. Florence had two daughters by her marriage to Christopher Kenn, who became Nicholas Stallinge's wards:

- Margaret Kenn, who married William Guise of Elmore in 1608. It was said that Kenn had disposed his estate to favour his unborn child, who he presumed would be a son. Her younger sister was considered to have the greater inheritance. A further legal complication was the complaint of Martha Stowell, a daughter of Kenn by his first marriage. This marriage had been declared invalid.
- Elizabeth Kenn, born after her father's death. The much older Scottish courtier Sir Robert Stewart (brother of the Earl of Orkney) wished to marry her in 1605, when she was 11 years old. King James wrote in his favour to Stallinge. Her mother told Sir Robert Steward to renew his suit when her daughter was of marriageable age. Stewart came to Kenn Court soon after the death of Stallinge, and her mother wrote, "with her childish resolution at his being here, that she could not affect him nor any other". In 1606 a marriage to Walter Devereux, son of the Earl of Essex and Elizabeth Southwell, was suggested and Lettice, Countess of Leicester, who acted as Devereux's guardian, was sceptical of her income and asked Cecil's opinion of the match. She married John Poulett, grandson of Amias Paulet, in 1614. There is a portrait of her at age 22 in 1616 by Robert Peake the Elder. Another portrait of a woman holding an image of the Magdalen with a squirrel on her arm and a lute on a table is sometimes said to depict her. Her second husband was Jack Ashburnham (1603-1671).

Florence Stallinge erected a monument in the Church of St John the Evangelist at Kenn to Christopher Kenn and her two daughters. She also had a portrait of herself and her two daughters made which was kept at Elmore Court.

Florence Stallinge rescued and fed her tenants and neighbours in the upper floors of Kenn Court during the great floods of 1607. Horses were stabled in the great hall, standing in floodwater.
