= Edward Rodney =

English politician

Sir Edward Rodney (29 June 1590 – 1657) was an English politician who sat in the House of Commons at various times between 1621 and 1642.

== History ==
Rodney was the son of Sir John Rodney of Rodney Stoke, Somerset, and his wife Jane Seymour, daughter of Sir Henry Seymour and niece of Queen Jane Seymour. He was educated at Trowbridge Grammar School and at Magdalen College, Oxford. He was then a student at Middle Temple where he "saluted only the law at a distance and mispent his time." In 1611 he accompanied William Seymour overseas after he escaped from the Tower of London to meet his wife Arbella Stuart. Seymour and Arbella were both in close line to the throne and they married secretly and without the King's consent, resulting in Seymour's imprisonment. Arbella was captured and later died in prison. Rodney returned to England later in 1611 leaving Seymour overseas for another four years. Rodney was knighted in May 1614 on the occasion of his marriage to a Lady in waiting to the Queen.

== Career ==
In 1621, Rodney was elected Member of Parliament for Wells. He was re-elected MP for Wells in 1624, 1625 and 1626. In 1628 he was elected MP for Somerset and sat until 1629 when King Charles decided to rule without parliament for eleven years. He was re-elected MP for Wells in April 1640 for the Short Parliament. He was re-elected again for Wells in the Long Parliament in November 1640, but was disabled from sitting in August 1642 for supporting the King.

Rodney commanded a regiment of the Somerset Trained Bands at Wells, which was called out in July 1642 by his fellow Wells MP, Sir Ralph Hopton, acting under the King's Commission of Array. Rodney's regiment took part in a skirmish at Wells in August. After the Parliamentarians overran Somerset following the Siege of Sherborne Castle in September, Rodney was probably replaced by a Parliamentarian, possibly Col William Strode. However, Rodney appears to have been reinstated following the Royalist victories of 1643 and the regiment took part in the Battle of Lostwithiel (August–September 1644) and the subsequent Siege of Taunton (September–December). In March 1645 it formed the garrison of Wells, and it was probably part of the garrison of Bristol when it was besieged and captured (August–September 1645).

== Family life ==
Rodney married Frances Southwell at Somerset House in May 1614. She was the daughter of Sir Robert Southwell of Woodrising, Norfolk, and his wife Lady Elizabeth Howard. She was a Lady of the Privy Chamber to Anne of Denmark. They had thirteen children, and only one son, George, reached his majority although he died aged 22. Their daughter Penelope married Peter Glenne of Norfolk and their daughter Ann married Sir Thomas Brydges of Keynsham.

Following the death of his last son, Rodney compiled a history of his family to stand as a reminder for his five surviving daughters and the families into which they married of the significance of the Rodney name.

Rodney died at the age of 67 and was buried at the Church of St Leonard, Rodney Stoke, where there is a monument.

Parliament of England
Preceded by Sidney Montagu; Thomas Southworth	Member of Parliament for Wells; 1621–1626; With: Thomas Southworth 1621–1624; Sir Thomas Lake	Succeeded by John Baber; Sir Ralph Hopton
Preceded by Sir Henry Berkeley; Sir John Horner	Member of Parliament for Somerset; 1628–1629; With: Sir Robert Phelips	Parliament suspended until 1640
Vacant Parliament suspended since 1629	Member of Parliament for Wells; 1640; With: John Baber 1640; Sir Ralph Hopton 1640–1642	Succeeded by Lislebone Long; Clement Walker
