= Thomas Southwell (died 1568) =

English landowner and courtier

Sir Thomas Southwell (1537–1568) was an English landowner and courtier.

He was a son of Robert Southwell and Margaret Neville (d. 1575), daughter of Thomas Neville. His mother recorded his birth date as 24 March 1537 in her Book of hours, which now held by Blackburn Museum and Art Gallery.

His home was at Woodrising, Norfolk.

== Marriages and children ==
He married three times. His first wife was Margaret or Mary Jerningham, daughter of Sir Henry Jerningham. The marriage seems to have taken place in January 1558, when black silver tinsel fabric for Mary Jerningham was obtained from the royal wardrobe.

His second wife was Mary Mansel, daughter of Rice Mansel of Penrice and Oxwich and Cecily Dabridgecourt. Their children included:

- Robert Southwell (died 1598), his heir, who married Elizabeth Howard

His third wife was Nazaret or Nazareth Newton. Their children included:

- Elizabeth Southwell, mistress of the Earl of Essex and mother of Walter Devereux (died 1641). She married Barentine Moleyns.

In his will, Southwell bequeathed the manors of Hoxne and Woodrising to Nazareth Newton during the minority of his son Robert. Robert inherited a gilt bowl and cup engraved with the Neville arms. His daughter Elizabeth was to have £1000 towards her marriage. He gave his clothes to his brother Francis Southwell. Amongst gifts to his servants, there was £5 for a Nicholas Stallendge, who may have become an usher to Queen Elizabeth and a landowner in Somerset.
