= Katherine Southwell =

Katherine Southwell (died 1657) was an English courtier.

She was a daughter of Sir Robert Southwell and Elizabeth Howard, and a granddaughter of Charles Howard, 1st Earl of Nottingham.

She was a gentlewoman in the household of Anne of Denmark, with her sisters Elizabeth Southwell and Frances Southwell. Frances and Katherine were given mourning clothes on the death of Prince Henry in 1612.

She died in April 1657.

== Marriage and children ==
She married Greville Verney, 7th Baron Willoughby de Broke in 1618. Their children included:

- Greville Verney, 8th Baron Willoughby de Broke
- Elizabeth Verney, who married William Peyto of Chesterton, son of Edward Peyto
- John Verney
- Richard Verney, 11th Baron Willoughby de Broke
