= Rice Mansel =

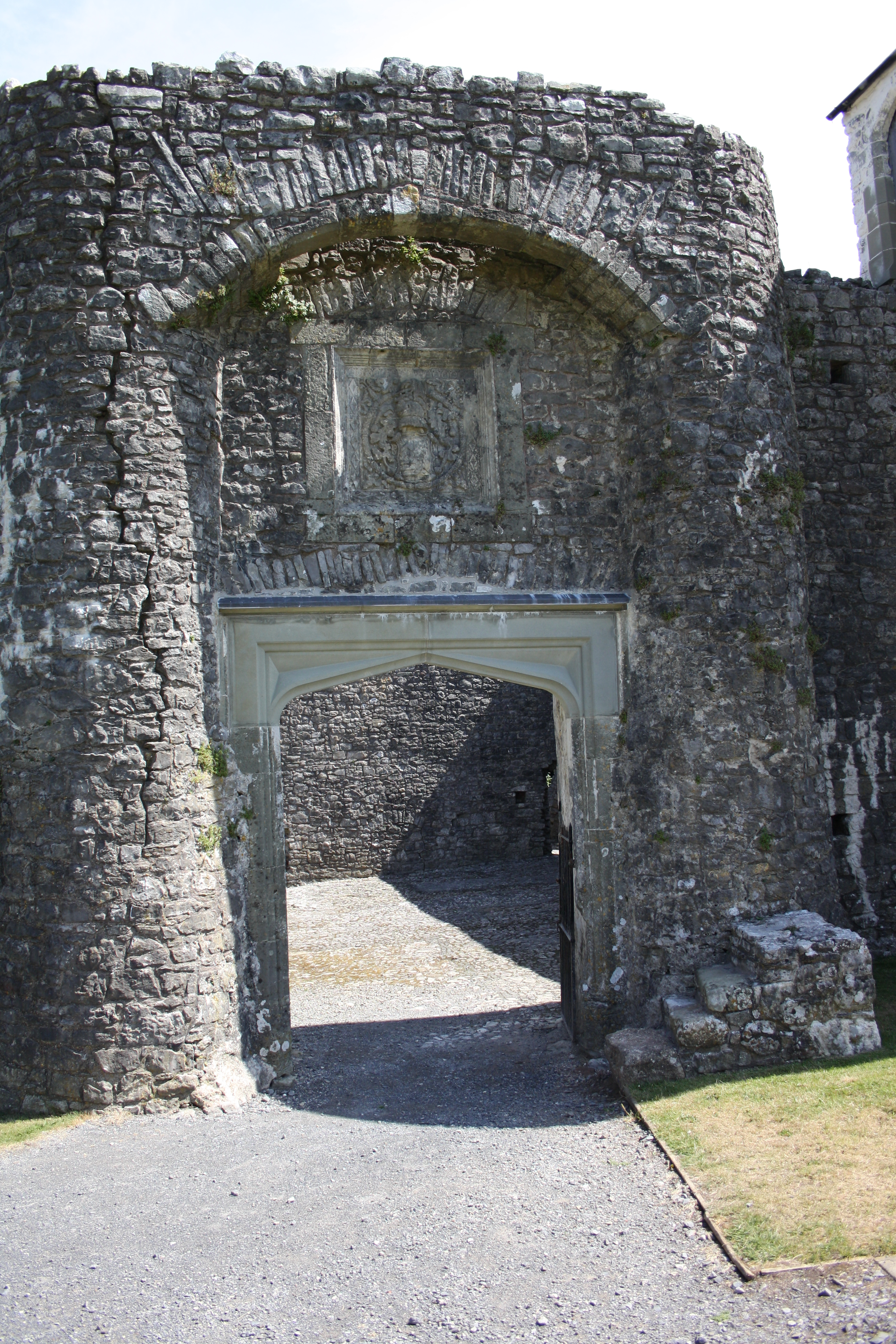
Oxwich Castle, Gate

Sir Rhys Mansel (c. 1487 – 1559), also Sir Rice Mansel, also Sir Rice Manxell, also Sir Rice Maunsell, was an administrator and courtier.

== Career ==
He was a son of Jenkyn Mansel of Oxwich Castle and Edith Kyme, daughter of George Kyme. Jenkyn Mansel attended a tournament at Carew Castle.

Rice Mansel was Vice-Admiral, High Sheriff of Glamorgan, a Commissioner of Peace and served as Chamberlain of Chester to King Henry VIII of England. He was High Sheriff of Glamorgan for 1542.

In 1529, he was one of the witnesses to the will of Matthew Cradock, who was married to Lady Catherine Gordon, widow of Perkin Warbeck.

He owned estates at Penrice and Oxwich, and at the Dissolution of the Monasteries he purchased Margam Abbey, which remained the property of his descendants until 1941.

He married three times, firstly Eleanor Basset, daughter of James Basset of Beaupre, and secondly, Anne Bridges, daughter of George Bridges of Coberly. Her son, Philip Mansel, married Mary Darrell.

== Cecily Dabridgecourt, Lady Mansel ==
In 1527, he married his third wife, Cecily Dabridgecourt (died 1558), a daughter of William or John Dabridgecourt of Wolston and Solihull and Maria, a daughter of Richard Mynors of Treago. From 1525, she was a lady in waiting to Lady Mary, later Mary I of England, who gave her gifts of jewellery. The poet Richard Edwardes wrote of her "Mansell is a merry one".

Princess Mary wrote to Thomas Cromwell after Cecily had married Rice Mansel, mentioning her "long and acceptable service to me done". Mansel wrote to Cromwell in 1535 describing his military service in Ireland with William Skeffington fighting Thomas FitzGerald, 10th Earl of Kildare.

Lady Mansel rode in Mary's coronation procession. Anne Browne, Lady Petre, was chief mourner at her funeral at St Bartholomew-the-Great in September 1558. Rice Mansel's brother, Philip Mansel of Llandewy married Anne Dabridgecourt.

== Children and will ==
Rice Mansel's children with his second wife, Anne Bridges, included:

- Philip Mansel
- Elizabeth Mansel, who married William Morgan of Llantarnam, Monmouthshire
- Catherine Mansel, who married William Bassett of Beaupre

Rice Mansel's children with his third wife, Cecily Dabridgecourt, included:

- Edward Mansel (d. 1595), who married Jane Somerset, daughter of the Earl of Worcester, and was the father of Robert Mansell sailor and glass-making entrepreneur.
- Anthony Mansel (MP), who married Elizabeth Basset, daughter of John Basset of Llantrithryd.
- Mary Mansel, who married Sir Thomas Southwell of Woodrising, Norfolk, and was the mother of Sir Robert Southwell.

Rice Mansel died on 10 April 1559. He was buried at Little St Bartolmew's in Smithfield, and there is a family monument at Margam. By his will, Rice Mansel left an "upper abiliment of goldsmith's work" for wearing on a French hood and a gown of purple cloth of silver to his daughter-in-law Jane. He left a pointed diamond to his daughter Mary Mansel which Queen Mary had given to his wife Cecily.
