= Ralph Hopton, 1st Baron Hopton =

Politician and soldier from Somerset

The Right Honourable The Lord Hopton KB, JP, DL, MP
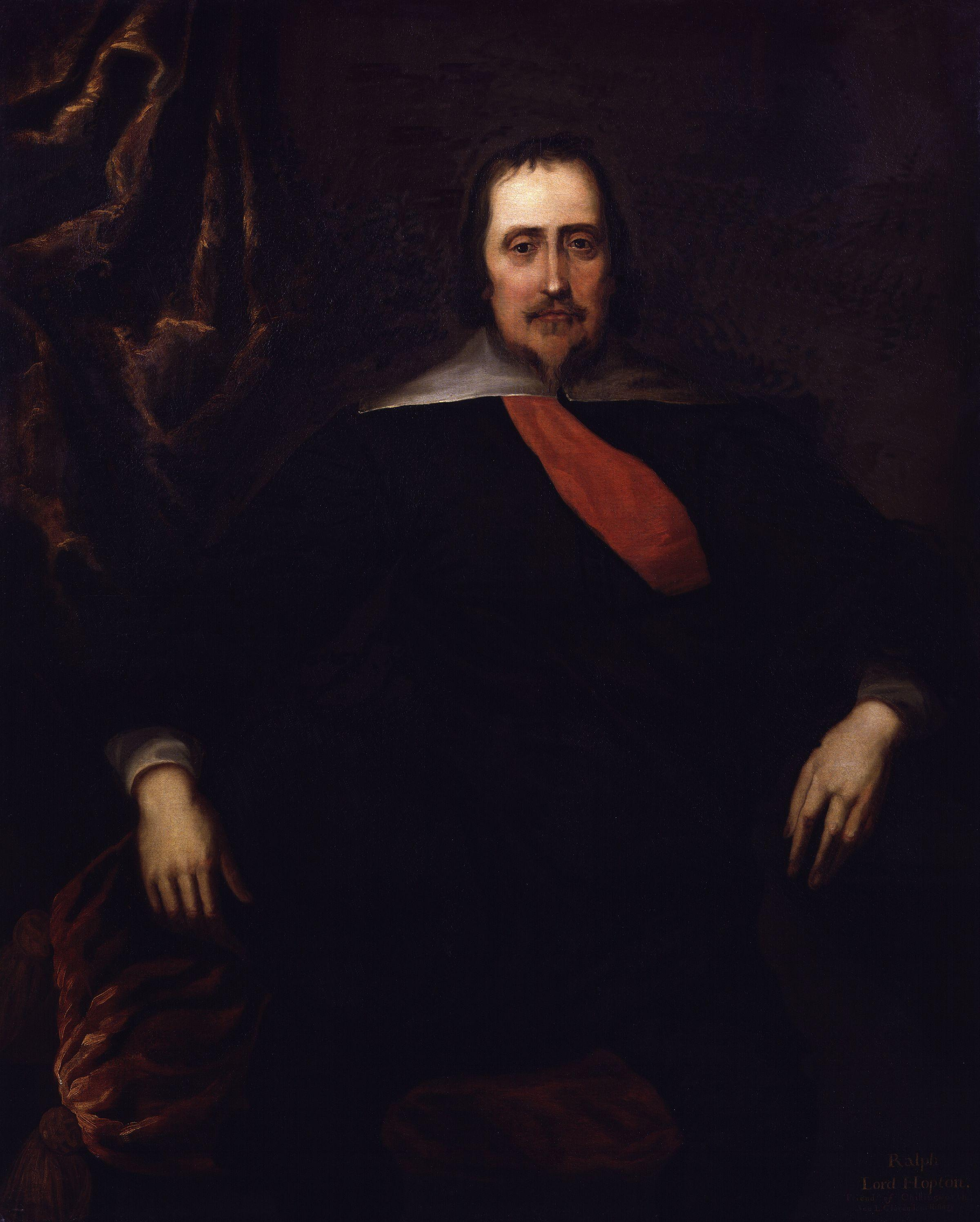
- Sir Ralph Hopton, Baron Stratton

Member of Parliament for Wells 1628
- In office 1640–1642

Member of Parliament for Somerset
- In office 1640–1640

Member of Parliament for Bath
- In office 1625–1626

Member of Parliament for Shaftesbury
- In office 1623–1625

Personal details
- Born: 1596 Witham Friary, Somerset, England
- Died: 28 September 1652 (aged 56) Bruges, Spanish Netherlands
- Resting place: Church of St Mary, Witham Friary
- Spouse: Elizabeth Capel (1596–1646)
- Relations: Sir Arthur Hopton (1588–1650)
- Education: Lincoln College, Oxford
- Occupation: Politician, soldier and landowner
- Awards: Knight of the Bath

Military service
- Rank: Major General
- Battles/wars: Bohemian Revolt 1620–1621; Palatinate; Siege of Breda; Wars of the Three Kingdoms; Braddock Down; Stratton; Lansdowne; Roundway Down; Cheriton; Torrington

Ralph Hopton, 1st Baron Hopton, c. 13 March 1596 – 28 September 1652, was a politician, soldier and peer from Somerset. During the First English Civil War, he served as Royalist commander in the West Country, and was made Baron Hopton of Stratton in 1643.

Along with his close friend Edward Hyde, he was made advisor to the future Charles II, who was appointed to rule the West in early 1644. He commanded the last significant Royalist field army, and followed Charles II into exile in March 1646.

A devout member of the Church of England, his religious views meant he took no further part in the 1638 to 1651 Wars of the Three Kingdoms. He died in Bruges in 1652.

In his account of the war, Clarendon described him as 'a man of great honour, integrity, and piety, of great courage and industry, and an excellent officer for any command but the supreme, to which he was not equal'.

== Personal details ==
Ralph Hopton was baptised on 13 March 1596 at St Peter's Church, Evercreech, eldest child of Robert Hopton (1575-)1638, and his wife Jane (c. 1570 -1610). The bulk of his grandfather's estates were sold to provide dowries for his ten daughters, leaving Robert Hopton only Witham Friary, acquired from Glastonbury Abbey after the Dissolution of the Monasteries in 1538.

In 1623, Hopton married Elizabeth Capel (1596-1646). They had no children, and his estates were inherited by his nephew Thomas, son of his eldest sister Catherine.

== Career ==
=== 1615 to 1642 ===
Hopton was probably educated at King's School, Bruton, then attended Lincoln College, Oxford, along with his uncle, Arthur. He moved to London to study law at the Middle Temple in 1614, and spent the next few years travelling in Europe. After the Thirty Years' War began in 1618, he joined an English volunteer force recruited by Sir Horace Vere. In 1620, this was sent to support Frederick of the Palatinate, newly appointed Protestant king of Bohemia. Frederick's wife, Elizabeth, was the daughter of James I, and Hopton's sister Abigail was one of her Maids of Honour.

After Frederick's defeat at White Mountain in November 1620, Hopton and his close friend William Waller were among those who escorted the Royal couple to safety, the Queen reportedly riding on his horse. They finally reached safety in the Dutch Republic in early 1621. He returned to London in February, where he was elected Member of Parliament for Shaftesbury. Parliament's fury at James' perceived lack of support for the Protestant cause resulted the prosecution of Edward Floyd, an elderly Catholic lawyer accused of insulting Frederick. Despite his personal anti-Catholicism, Hopton argued Floyd should not be condemned without a proper hearing, and he was ultimately released, after James intervened.

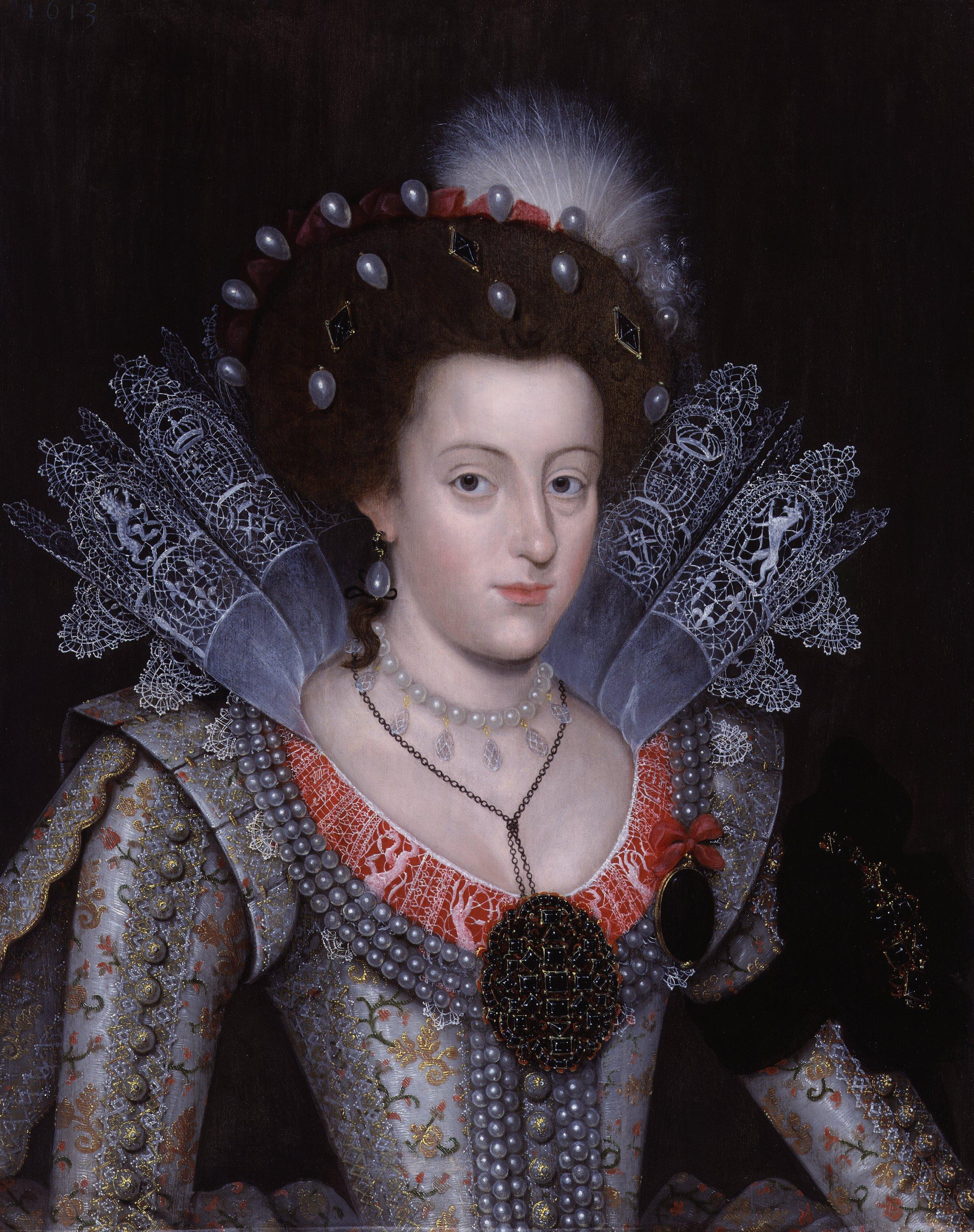
Hopton helped Elizabeth Stuart, Queen of Bohemia, escape from Prague in 1620

After Parliament adjourned in June, he went back to Europe and took part in the Palatinate campaign. It appears likely he was among the English garrison of Frankenthal, which was ordered by James to surrender in March 1623. During a brief stay in England, he married Elizabeth Capell, who was five years his senior, and widow of Justinian Lewin, a Privy Councillor. He declined to stand as MP for Somerset in 1624, instead joining an expedition to relieve Breda, then besieged by the Spanish. Lack of money meant the expedition arrived in the Dutch Republic in an 'appalling state', Breda surrendered shortly thereafter, and Hopton returned home in July 1625.

In his absence, Hopton was elected MP for Bath in place of Nicholas Hyde, uncle of Edward Hyde. This links Hopton with those moderates who opposed the Personal Rule of Charles I, but ultimately supported him when the First English Civil War began in 1642. Hopton was made a Knight of the Bath in February 1626, and MP for Wells in 1628. The following year, Charles dissolved Parliament, and did not recall it until 1640.

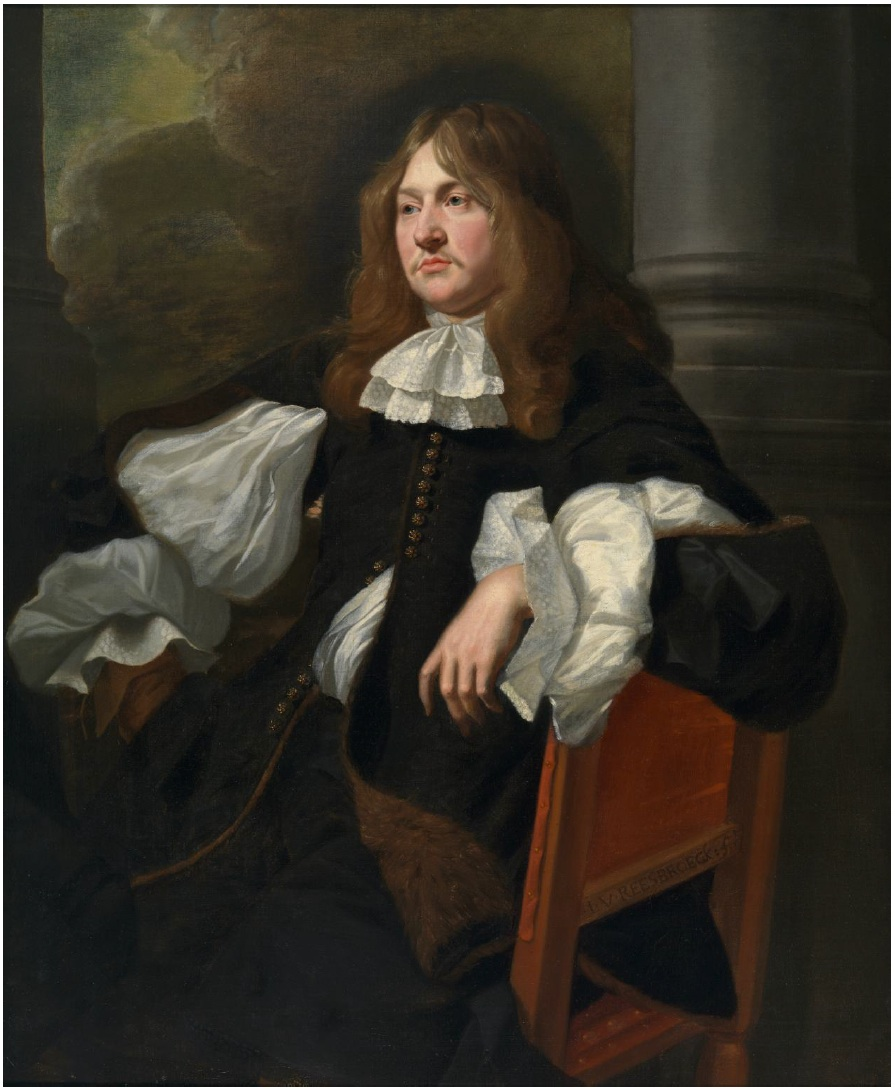
Hopton's close friend, Edward Hyde

Appointed Deputy lieutenant of Somerset, and a Justice of the Peace, Hopton inherited his father's estates in 1638. He avoided involvement in the political debates of the 1630s, but supported Ship money, and in 1639 raised a troop of cavalry to fight in the first of the two Bishops Wars. Charles assembled 15,000 men at York but lack of funding meant most were untrained, unfed, unpaid and mutinous, while many conscripts from the Northern trained bands were armed only with bows and arrows. He was obliged to agree the Treaty of Berwick, leaving the Covenanters in control of Scotland.

Seeking funds for another attempt, in early 1640 Charles called what became known as the Short Parliament. Hopton was re-elected for Somerset, but Parliament refused to provide taxes without concessions, and was dissolved after three weeks. Hopton took no part in the 1640 Bishops War, and in November 1640 was elected for Wells in the Long Parliament, which Charles was forced to call to raise the money to pay the Scots to return large parts of Northern England.

Along with Edward Hyde and other moderates, he voted for the execution of Charles' chief advisor, the Earl of Strafford, but unlike them, he also backed the Grand Remonstrance in late 1641. A committed supporter of the Church of England, the arrest of Archbishop Laud and exclusion of bishops from the Lords seems to have been the point when he changed sides. He defended the attempt to arrest the Five Members in January 1642, and in early March was held in the Tower of London for two weeks for objecting to Parliament censuring the king.

=== 1642 to 1646 ===
Southern and Western England, 1642 to 1646

After his release in March, Hopton was appointed Royalist Commissioner of Array for Somerset, placing him in command of the local trained bands. Despite Hopton's connections, the county was dominated by Parliament, forcing him to withdraw to Sherborne, in Dorset; the First English Civil War began on 22 August, when Charles raised his standard at Nottingham.

Charles named the Marquess of Hertford as his Lieutenant General in the West. Threatened by a larger Parliamentary army under the Earl of Bedford, the Royalists retreated from Wells to Minehead, where Hopton advised Hertford to take the infantry and artillery across the water to South Wales.

Accompanied by a small force of cavalry, Hopton joined Sir Bevil Grenville and other supporters in Cornwall. Under his command, the Royalists won victories at Braddock Down in January 1643, then Stratton in May. After the inconclusive Battle of Lansdowne on 5 July, he linked up with Hertford and Prince Maurice; their combined force destroyed William Waller's Western Association army at Roundway Down on 13 July. The biggest Royalist success of the war, it secured the West Country, apart from isolated garrisons in Plymouth and elsewhere.

Temporarily blinded by an explosion after Lansdowne, Hopton was confirmed as Royalist commander in the West, made Baron Hopton of Stratton, and governor of Bristol. In September, it was agreed Prince Rupert would move against London, while Hopton advanced into Hampshire and Sussex, whose iron foundries were Parliament's main source of armaments. However, Rupert was checked at Newbury on 20 September, and although Hopton reached Winchester in November, he was prevented from moving further.

In March 1644, he was defeated at Cheriton, ending the Royalist campaign in Southern England, and damaging his position with Charles. Although he served in the Lostwithiel campaign, his main role became one of administration; in early 1645, he was appointed to the Council advising the future Charles II. After Naseby in June, the Western Army was the last significant Royalist field force, but was scattered by the New Model Army at Langport in July.

Hopton succeeded Lord Goring as commander in January 1646, but the remnants of his army were defeated at Torrington on 16 February 1646. He pulled back to Truro, where he surrendered to Thomas Fairfax on 12 March.

=== 1646 to 1652 ===
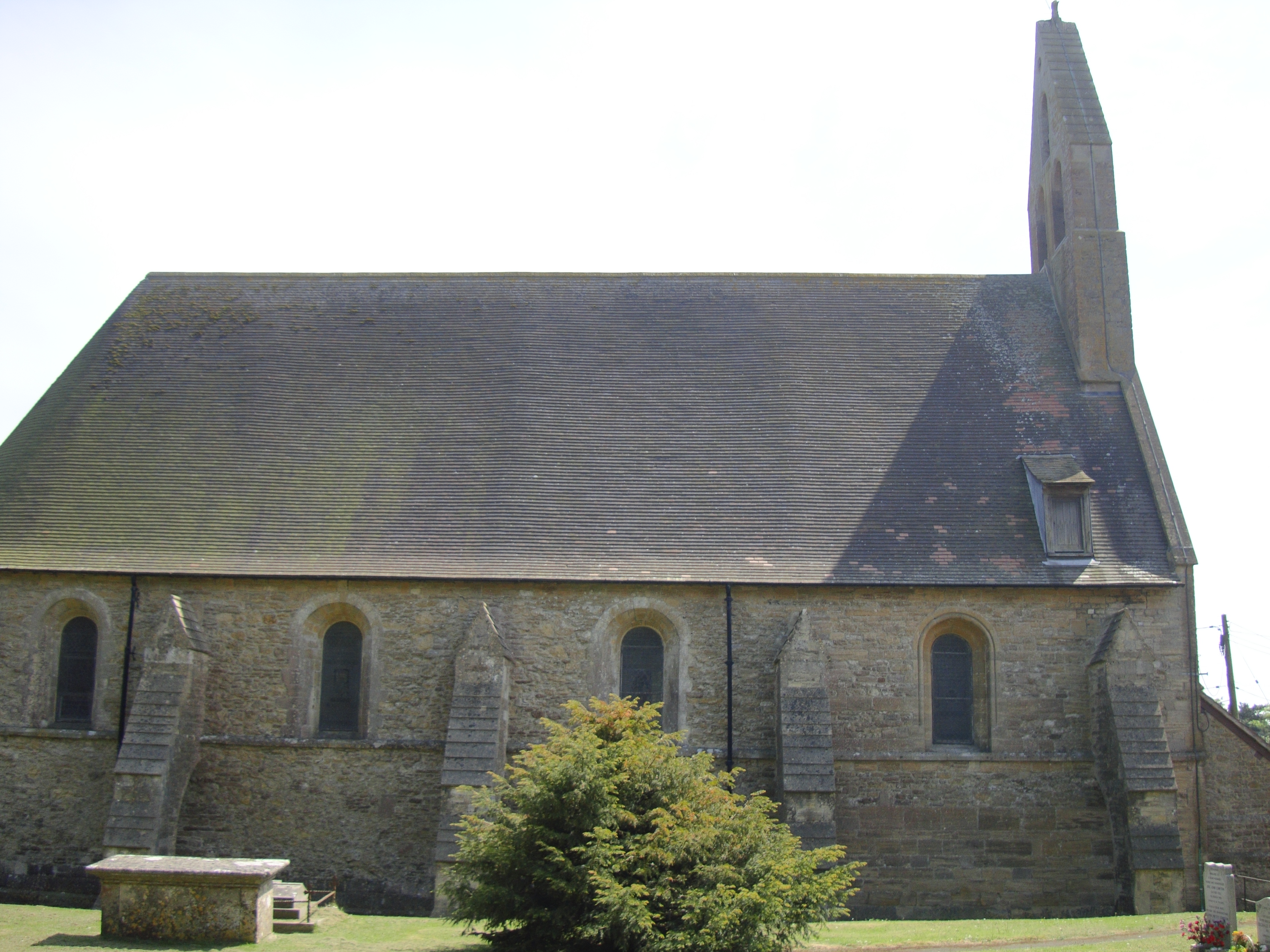
In 1661, Hopton was reburied in the Church of St Mary, Witham Friary

Along with Edward Hyde, he followed the Prince of Wales to Jersey, but they refused to accompany him to Paris, concerned over the influence of his strongly Catholic mother, Henrietta Maria. His wife died shortly after, and in 1647, he moved to Rouen, where he stayed with his uncle, Sir Arthur Hopton, former Ambassador in Madrid.

He resumed his position as advisor to Charles II during the 1648 to 1649 Second English Civil War, which continued after the execution of Charles I in January 1649. He resigned after Charles II signed the 1650 Treaty of Breda, which agreed to impose Presbyterianism on England in return for Scottish support in restoring him to the throne. An Episcopalian Church of England was central to Hopton's political beliefs, and he refused to support it.

While in exile, he wrote Bellum civile, an account of his campaign in the West from 1642 to 1644. He died at Bruges in September 1652, and after the 1660 Restoration, his body was reburied at St Mary's, in Witham Friary in Somerset. Confiscated by Parliament in 1647, his estates were returned to his family, and inherited by his nephew Thomas Wyndham.

== Sources ==
- Akkerman, Nadine, ed. (2015). The Correspondence of Elizabeth Stuart, Queen of Bohemia: 1603-1631, Volume 1. Oxford: Oxford University Press. ISBN 978-0-19-955107-1.
- Asch, Ronald (2016). "Elizabeth, Princess [Elizabeth Stuart]". Oxford Dictionary of National Biography (Online ed.). Oxford University Press. doi:10.1093/ref:odnb/8638. (Subscription, Wikipedia Library access or UK public library membership required.)
- Barratt, John (2004). Cavalier Generals: King Charles I and His Commanders in the English Civil War 1642–46. Barnsley: Pen & Sword Military. ISBN 1-84415-128-X.
- Brooks, Richard (2005). Cassell's Battlefields of Britain and Ireland. London: Weidenfeld & Nicolson. ISBN 0-304-36333-2.
- Clarendon, Earl of (1704). The History of the Rebellion and Civil Wars in England; Volume III (2019 ed.). Wentworth Press. ISBN 978-0469445765.
- Edgar, F. T. R. (1968). Sir Ralph Hopton. The King's Man in the West (1642–1652). Oxford: Clarendon Press. ISBN 0-19-821372-7.
- Harris, Tim (2015). Rebellion. OUP. ISBN 978-0199209002.
- Hopton, Ralph (1902). Chadwyck-Healey, Charles (ed.). Bellum civile. London: Printed for subscribers by Harrison and Sons. OCLC 1041068269.
- Hutton, Robert (2008). "Hopton, Ralph, Baron Hopton". Oxford Dictionary of National Biography (Online ed.). Oxford University Press. doi:10.1093/ref:odnb/13772. (Subscription, Wikipedia Library access or UK public library membership required.)
- Loomie, AJ (2008). "Hopton, Sir Arthur". Oxford Dictionary of National Biography (Online ed.). Oxford University Press. doi:10.1093/ref:odnb/13770. (Subscription, Wikipedia Library access or UK public library membership required.)
- Noble, Thomas F.X. (2011) [2008]. Western Civilization: Beyond Boundaries Volume I: To 1715. Boston: Wadsworth, Cengage Learning. ISBN 978-1-424-06961-3.
- Questier, Michael (2009). Stuart Dynastic Policy and Religious Politics, 1621-1625: Volume 34. CUP. ISBN 978-0521194037.
- Royle, Trevor (2004). Civil War: The Wars of the Three Kingdoms 1638–1660 (2006 ed.). Abacus. ISBN 978-0-349-11564-1.
- Thrush, Andrew; Ferris, John, eds. (2010). 'Sir Ralph Hopton, (1596-1652) in 'The House of Commons, 1604-1629 (The History of Parliament Trust). Cambridge University Press. ISBN 978-0436192746.
- Wedgwood, CV (1958). The King's War, 1641-1647 (2001 ed.). Penguin Classics. ISBN 978-0141390727.
- Wilson, Peter (2009). Europe's Tragedy: A History of the Thirty Years War. Allen Lane. ISBN 978-0713995923.

Parliament of England
Preceded by William Beecher; Thomas Sheppard	Member of Parliament for Shaftesbury; 1621–1622; With: Percy Herbert	Succeeded by William Whitaker; John Thoroughgood
Preceded by Sir Robert Pye; John Malet	Member of Parliament for Bath; 1625; With: Edward Hungerford	Succeeded by Richard Gray; William Chapman
Preceded by Sir Edward Rodney; Sir Thomas Lake	Member of Parliament for Wells; 1628–1629; With: John Baber	Parliament suspended until 1640
Vacant Parliament suspended since 1629	Member of Parliament for Somerset; 1640; With: Thomas Smith	Succeeded by Sir John Poulett; Sir John Stawell
Preceded by Sir Edward Rodney; John Baber	Member of Parliament for Wells; 1640–1642; With: Sir Edward Rodney	Succeeded by Lislebone Long; Clement Walker
Peerage of England
New creation	Baron Hopton of Stratton; 1643–1652	Extinct
