= Michael Molyns =

English politician

Michael Molyns (born c. 1601) was an English politician who sat in the House of Commons in 1625.

Molyns was the son of Sir Barentyne Molyns of Clapcot (now in the parish of Brightwell-cum-Sotwell, Oxfordshire) and Elizabeth Southwell daughter of Thomas Southwell of Woodrising, Norfolk and Nazareth Newton. He was the grandson of the earlier Michael Molyns MP, and the half-brother of Walter Devereux.

He matriculated at St John's College, Oxford on 15 November 1616 at the age of 15. In 1625, he was elected Member of Parliament for Wallingford.

Parliament of England
| Preceded by Sir Anthony Forrest; Sir George Simeon | Member of Parliament for Wallingford; 1625; With: Sir Anthony Forrest | Succeeded by Sir Anthony Forrest; Unton Croke |
