= Kenn Church, Kenn Pier & Yew Tree Farm SSSI =

Protected area in Somerset, England

Kenn Church, Kenn Pier & Yew Tree Farm
- Site of Special Scientific Interest
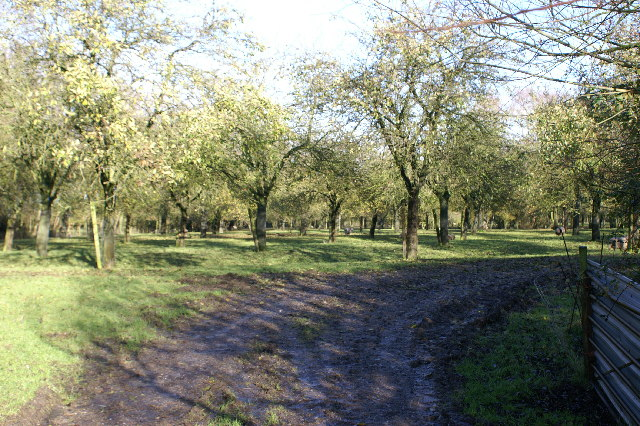

- Location within Somerset
- Location of Kenn Church, Kenn Pier & Yew Tree Farm.
- Area of search: Avon
- Grid reference: ST415689
- Coordinates: 51.4215°N 2.8427°W
- Interest: Geological
- Area: 15.37 hectares (0.1537 km^{2}; 0.0593 sq mi)
- Notification date: 1997

Kenn Church, Kenn Pier & Yew Tree Farm SSSI (grid reference ST415689) is a 15.37 hectare geological Site of Special Scientific Interest near the village of Kenn, Somerset, notified in 1997.

The site is listed in the Geological Conservation Review because it consists of a complex sequence of Pleistocene sediments, including coarse glacial outwash gravels at the base overlain by a complex sequence of interglacial freshwater, estuarine and marine sands. The sequence is then capped by aeolian (windblown) coversands and Holocene silts.
