= Anthony Forrest =

English politician (c.1590s–c.1620s)

Sir Anthony Forrest (fl. 1590s–1620s) was an English politician who sat in the House of Commons from 1624 to 1626.

Forrest was the son of Miles Forrest of Morborne, Huntingdonshire, and his wife Elizabeth Colly (dau. of Anthony Colly). He was admitted at Emmanuel College, Cambridge on 8 September 1591 and was admitted at Gray's Inn on 8 July 1595. He was knighted on 20 August 1604. In 1624, he was elected Member of Parliament for Wallingford in the Happy Parliament. He was elected MP for Wallingford in 1625 and 1626.

Forrest married firstly Jane Haselrigge, daughter of Thomas Haselrigge of Noseley, Leicestershire at Noseley. His second wife was called Judith, and his third wife Robena.

Parliament of England
Preceded by Sir Edward Howard; Sir George Simeon	Member of Parliament for Wallingford; 1624–1626; With: Sir George Simeon 1624; Michael Molyns 1625; Unton Croke 1626	Succeeded by Sir Robert Knollys; Edmund Dunch
