= George Simeon =

Sir George Simeon (c.1584 – 4 May 1664) was an English landowner and politician who sat in the House of Commons between 1614 and 1624.

Simeon was the son of John Simeon of Brightwell Baldwin, Minigrove, Britwell Priory, Chilworth, and Stoke Talmage in Oxfordshire and his wife Anne Molyns, daughter of Anthony Molyns. He was knighted in 1604. In 1611 he sold "The Howe" to his brother, later Sir John Simeon.

In 1614, he was elected Member of Parliament for Wallingford. After entering Gray's Inn in 1616 to study law he was re-elected MP for Wallingford in 1621 and in 1624.

Simeon married Mary Vaux, daughter of the Hon. George Vaux, eldest son of William Vaux, 3rd Baron Vaux of Harrowden, and had two daughters, Anne and Elizabeth who married to Edmund Butler, 4th Viscount Mountgarret. Simeon married secondly, Margaret Molyneux, daughter of Sir Richard Molyneux, 1st Baronet of Sefton, Lancashire and was succeeded by the youngest and only surviving son of five, James.

Parliament of England
Preceded by Sir William Dunch; Griffith Payne	Member of Parliament for Wallingford; 1614–1624; With: Sir Carey Reynolds 1614; Samuel Dunch 1621–1622; Sir Edward Howard 1624; Sir Anthony Forrest 1624	Succeeded by Sir Anthony Forrest; Michael Molyns
