= Chertsey Meads =

Nature reserve in Surrey, England

Coordinates: 51.385°N 0.477°W

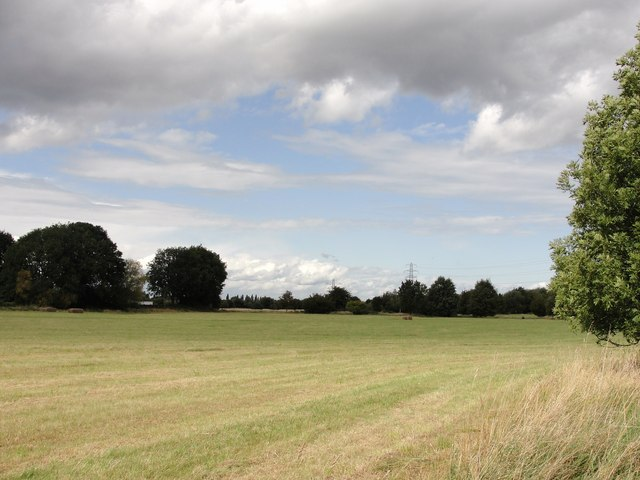
- Interactive map of Chertsey Meads
- Type: Local Nature Reserve
- Location: Chertsey, Surrey
- OS grid: TQ 061 662
- Area: 41.0 hectares (101 acres)
- Manager: Runnymede Borough Council

Chertsey Meads is a 41-hectare (100-acre) Local Nature Reserve east of Chertsey in Surrey. It is owned and managed by Runnymede Borough Council.

This is an area of floodplain meadow on the bank of the River Thames. Over 400 plant species have been recorded and 108 bird species, including lesser whitethroat, reed bunting, reed warbler and sedge warbler.

There is access from Mead Lane.

Henry VIII came to Oatlands on a progress and hunted stags on Chertsey Meads in 1514. The stage were held in pens and released one by one. Sir Philip Draycot described the hunt with greyhounds and horsemen with spears, as "the most princely sport that hath been seen".
