= Ralph Dison =

Servant of the English royal family (died 1628)

Ralph Dison or Ralfe Dyson (died 1628) was a servant of the English royal family.

Dison was under-keeper of the royal palace, gardens, and wardrobe at Oatlands. His annual fee was £12. The keeper was John Trevor (1563–1630), whose annual fee was £27-7s-8d.

His name appears in the inventories of Anne of Denmark. He made a list of six paintings to be sent to the queen's gallery at Hampton Court with a servant of John Whynyard, yeoman of the king's beds, and oversaw the return of red velvet hangings to Whitehall Palace and a folding Chinese screen to Somerset House. Dison was included as under-keeper of Oatlands in a version of Anne's household roll written in French in 1619.

In December 1618, Frances Southwell, a gentlewoman of Anne's privy chamber, wrote a note to Ralph Dison requesting a group of six paintings with religious subjects which Anne of Denmark wanted to display in her gallery at Hampton Court.

Ralph Dison died before 1628. The executor of his will was his widow Phoebe Alexander, the daughter of a London ironmonger Ralph Cannynge.

The next under-keeper at Oatlands was John Griffith.
