= John Baber (MP) =

English politician and lawyer

John Baber (c. 1593–1644) was an English lawyer and politician who sat in the House of Commons between 1628 and 1640.

Baber was the son of John Baber DD of Tormarton, Gloucestershire. He matriculated at Lincoln College, Oxford on 15 April 1608, aged 15 and was awarded BA on 22 May 1611. He was called to the bar at Lincoln's Inn in 1621 and became recorder of Wells. In 1628, Baber was elected Member of Parliament for Wells and sat until 1629 when King Charles decided to rule without parliament for eleven years.

Baber became a bencher in 1639. In April 1640, he was re-elected MP for Wells in the Short Parliament.

Baber died in 1644, aged 50.

Parliament of England
Preceded by Sir Edward Rodney; Sir Thomas Lake	Member of Parliament for Wells; 1628–1629; With: Sir Ralph Hopton	Parliament suspended until 1640
Vacant Parliament suspended since 1629	Member of Parliament for Wells; 1640; With: Sir Edward Rodney	Succeeded by Sir Edward Rodney; Sir Ralph Hopton
