= Thomas Southwell (died 1643) =

Thomas Southwell (1598-1643) was an English landowner.

He was a son of Robert Southwell (died 1598) of Woodrising, Norfolk, and Elizabeth Howard, eldest daughter of Charles Howard, 1st Earl of Nottingham, and a lady in waiting to Queen Elizabeth.

He held the office of Vice-Admiral of Yarmouth.

He sold the family estates to Francis Crane.

Thomas Southwell died in 1643.

== Marriages, infidelity, and children ==
Southwell married Margaret Fuller on 27 March 1618. Robert Herrick wrote an Epithalamium. Their children included:

- Elizabeth Southwell (d. 1619), buried at Burnham Overy
- Sarah Southwell, who married William Peacock
- Elizabeth Southwell, who married John Middleton of Hangleton, Sussex
- Frances Southwell, who married William Bemboe
- Penelope Southwell, who married William Levet of Petworth

He came to live apart from his first wife in the company of Mary Eden, the daughter of a Doctor of Laws (presumably Thomas Eden LL.D. of Trinity Hall, Cambridge). Margaret Southwell complained in 1634 about his adultery and relationship with her sister. He married Margaret Eden in 1637, they had no children.
