= Church of St John The Evangelist, Kenn =

Church in Somerset, England

Church of St John The Evangelist
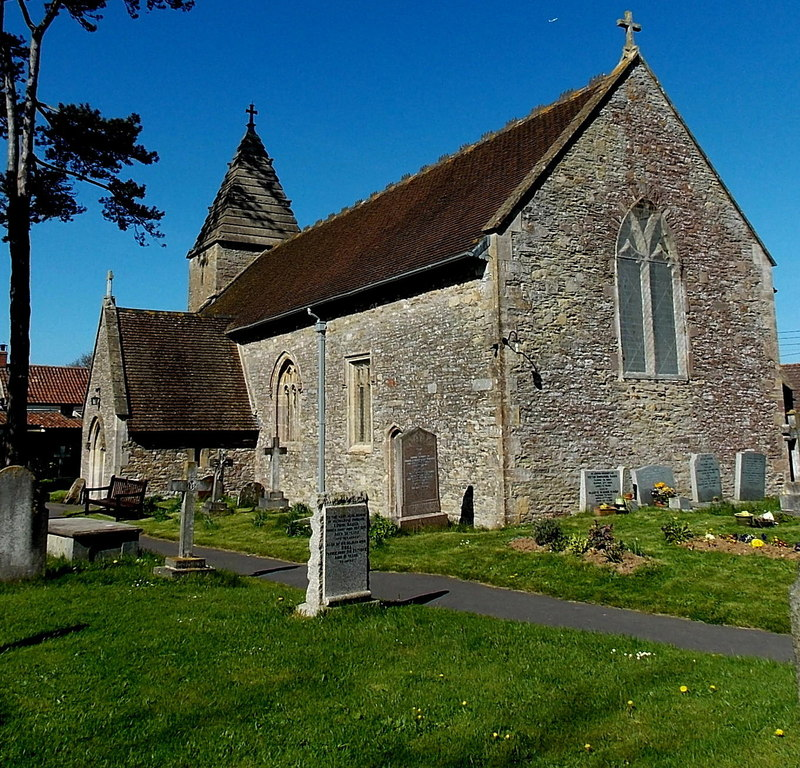

- Location within Somerset
- 51.4168°N 2.8413°W
- Location: Kenn, Somerset, England

Listed Building – Grade II*
- Official name: Church of St. John The Evangelist
- Designated: 11 October 1961
- Reference no.: 1136680

Listed Building – Grade II
- Official name: Cross in the churchyard about 6 metres south of nave of Church of G.V. St. John The Evangelist
- Designated: 20 January 1986
- Reference no.: 1320974

Scheduled monument
- Official name: Churchyard cross in St John The Evangelist's churchyard
- Designated: 2 January 1997
- Reference no.: 1015515

The Anglican Church of St John The Evangelist at Kenn within the English county of Somerset has a Norman tower, with much of the rest of the church dating from around 1300. It has been designated as a Grade II* listed building.

The cross in the churchyard is both a Grade II listed building and has been scheduled as an ancient monument.

== History ==
The tower is Norman with the chancel being from around 1300 and the south door from the 15th century. The rest of the building, including the nave, porch and vestry, was restored or rebuilt in the 19th century.

The parish is part of the Yatton Moor benefice within the Diocese of Bath and Wells.

== Architecture ==
The nave is of two bays.

Within the church is a stone font believed to be from the 14th century.

The churchyard cross was restored as a war memorial after the first world war using the 14th century octagonal four step calvary (base).
