= Walter Devereux (died 1641) =

English politician

Sir Walter Devereux (1591– 26 July 1641) was an English politician who sat in the House of Commons at various times between 1614 and 1641. Walter was a close companion of his half-brother, Robert Devereux, 3rd Earl of Essex, and played a significant role in Essex's actions on behalf of Parliament.

== Childhood and Ancestry ==
Devereux was the son of Robert Devereux, 2nd Earl of Essex and his mistress, Elizabeth Southwell. Elizabeth Southwell was the daughter of Thomas Southwell of Woodrising and his third wife, Nazareth Newton, and the half-sister of Vice Admiral Sir Robert Southwell.

The Earl acknowledged his son and made financial arrangements on his behalf with an addendum to his will in July 1595, "Walter Devereux the base and reputed sonne of the said Robt Erle of Essex, begotten of the body of Eliz: Southwell." The intent of the deed is thought to have been the granting of Essex House to Walter Devereux, but there is no evidence this disposition actually occurred. His only reported manor was that of Lamphey in Pembrokeshire, which comprised just 721 acres and yielded a little over £203 in rents each year. He sold Lamphey manor to Richard Cuny in November 1618, whereupon his half-brother, Robert, 3rd earl of Essex, bestowed upon him the lease of Lamphey rectory. The lack of adequate means was probably the principal cause that Devereux spent most of his adult life in Essex's household in Staffordshire and Westminster, and although he persistently described himself as being ‘of Lamphey’ there is no evidence to suppose that he ever lived there.

Walter was given over to the care of Essex's mother, Lettice (Knollys) (Devereux) Dudley, Countess of Leicester, who raised him at Drayton Bassett in Staffordshire. With the execution of his father, Robert Devereux, on 25 February 1601 he found himself stripped of his main source of support. Essex's assets had been seized, and now Walter Devereux was an even greater social pariah, the illegitimate son of a traitor.

During this period after the 2nd Earl's execution, Walter was permitted to continue his studies at Oxford, and matriculated from Queen's College, Oxford on 16 November 1604 at the age of 13. During this time he apparently drew closer to his half-brother, Robert Devereux, the legal heir of the 2nd Earl and future 3rd Earl who also was suffering from these losses. Throughout the remainder of Walter's life, he would remain a retainer of Robert, and when the title was restored in July 1603 Walter's fortunes rose as well.

== Career ==
Walter Devereux was sent in 1608 to a riding academy in Angers, France. He had returned by May 1613 when the divorce suit of his half-brother, Robert Devereux, began, and over the next several months was manipulated by the King and his powerful allies at the expense of Essex and the Devereux family's reputation. Essex's wife, Frances Howard, and the King's faction forced the divorce to be granted as nullity requiring impotence to permit her remarriage to the King's favorite. The ongoing slurs and insults drove Essex to challenge his brother-in-law, Henry Howard, on 20 August to a duel, and Walter would serve as one of Essex's seconds. The King would not allow the duel to go forward. On 25 September the verdict of nullity was granted, and the next day the King called a special Court of Honor to stop the duel. The Court interviewed the seconds including Walter Devereux, but the testimony was altered. Essex refused to sign the report indicating they were false. Walter signed with Richard Oubeley the following "Declaration of Essex’s Seconds":

Whereas there has been a new relation of the quarrel betwixt my Lord of Essex and Mr. Henry Howard, after his Majesty had reconciled them, made by the four seconds before Sir Horatio Vere and Sir John Wentworth, and the same being drawn into the brief by Mr. Horton, one that was secretary to the last Lord Treasurer, and we setting our hands thereto, not reading it, but only hearing it read, not mistrusting anything, but to find just dealing, have since seen a copy thereof, which we find contrary to that which was then agreed upon, and merely false in some main points; we have a sight of the original copy for our satisfaction, not to satisfy the world, for the which we do unjustly suffer a hard censure.

Be it known, therefore, to all men, that we do utterly disclaim from any such writing. And whereas we have been hitherto tender and sparing of their reputations, now, finding that they have put this trick upon us, we do publish to the world no writing but the first to be true - to which we have only set our hands - and they have acknowledged to be true before Sir Horatio Vere and Sir Jno. Wentworth, and at divers other times to others; and so true, as they neither can nor dare deny it, in which is plain to be seen they might have fought if they would. And thus much we will be ready to justify, upon the sacrament first, and then with our swords.

On 11 October Essex was called before the Privy Council, probably reprimanded and rebuked, but all that is known for certain was his confinement to his London residence. A Warrant was issued for Walter Devereux, and on 13 October he was imprisoned in the Fleet Prison with no cause stated. In early November, Essex and Walter were released from prison, and evidently pressured to accept what had occurred. The final insult happened a few weeks later when the Howard family demanded his wife's dowry back, and Essex was forced to sell parts of his estate and borrow money from his grandmother, Lettice the Countess of Leicester.

The two brothers were now joined more closely, and as a retainer of the 3rd Earl of Essex, Walter found himself strongly in opposition to the Stuart monarchy, and a staunch supporter of Parliament in the evolving Civil War. Through Essex's influence, he became a courtier at the Court of James I in 1613, and was knighted at Ashby-de-la-Zouch, Leicestershire on 2 September 1617 during the King's progress through Stafford. On 2 February 1618 he performed in "The Fairies' Farewell: The Masque at Coleorton" at his half-sister, Frances Devereux's marriage to Sir William Seymour.

Essex set out for the Low Countries in 1620 with 300 volunteers in his company, and commissioned Walter Devereux to act as his agent while abroad. On 31 August 1620 Essex crossed the Rhine by a bridge of boats below Wesel and joined Prince Henry of Nassau. Over the next month they maneuvered through the Palatinate, but the Prince refused to engage the enemy. Essex returned to England in December 1620 to try to obtain additional troops that were promised him, but failed leading to his volunteering for service under Prince Maurice, at the "leaguer of Dernick." Essex spent the summers of 1622 and 1623 with the army in Holland, and it can be expected that Walter attended him there. Also, as Essex wintered in England during these years either at Drayton, Chartley, or one of the Earl of Hertford's houses, Walter probably traveled with him there as well. At Drayton they visited their grandmother Lady Leicester, who favored having masques (plays) for their entertainment. Other pastimes included hunting, and games such as chess or catastrophe.

When Essex set out with the English Expeditionary Force to the Low Countries in August 1624, Walter accompanied him as a captain of the foot in Essex's regiment. He remained with Essex through the Winter at the Siege of Breda and shared the hardships and hand-to-hand combat occurring at the close of this action. In May 1625 he opted to remain in the Low Countries due to disease in London, and requested payment for this extended service from the Dutch government in May 1626. Walter Devereux returned to England in July 1625 for Parliamentary elections, and may have returned to the Low Countries with Essex who finally returned to England in November 1626 for good after failing to be given an appropriate command with the troops being sent to join the King of Denmark under General Morgan.

On 25 December 1634 Walter Devereux lost one of his main benefactors when his grandmother, Lettice, died. His family ties were further strained when in mid-1636 his half-brother, Robert Earl of Essex, became suspicious his second wife, Elizabeth Paulet, was having an affair. He had left her at his sister's house in Hertford in March 1636 to return to his estates at Chartley where he was needed to manage his affairs. It is not clear whether Walter took it upon himself, or Robert set him the task, but by July Walter had acquired evidence of Essex's wife's affair with Sir William Uvedale. The Earl began to plan for a divorce, but Lady Essex then announced she was pregnant. Essex was divided on the proper course to take, but came to the conclusion that if the child was born by 5 November it was possible that he was the father. A stressful few months passed and the child was born on 5 November. A son and heir, who Essex accepted as his own. Within a few months the child died of plague and Essex's marriage was over in all but name.

The outcome of these events appears to have also left its mark on Robert's relationship with his brother, Walter, and they would never be as close again.

== Parliament ==
In 1614, he was elected Member of Parliament for Pembroke. The ‘Addled Parliament' sat for only 8 weeks from 5 April to 7 June and then was dissolved by James I for failing to pass any legislation.

Walter would represent Pembroke again in the 'Happy Parliament' from 1624 to 1625 participating in the "Prince’s" Parliament, but was not present at the 'Useless Parliament' in 1625 probably due to his overseas service. It was probably this Devereux who was named to the committee for the bill to authorize the sale of the Staffordshire lands of the two Thomas Copes, father and son (16 March 1624). It also seems likely that it was he who attended one of the four committee meetings concerned with the bill to reverse a decree in the Court of Requests involving two Welshmen, as he was appointed by virtue of being a Member for a Welsh constituency. However, it is unclear which Devereux was named to consider the bills to naturalize James, marquess of Hamilton (14 April 1624) and overturn a Chancery decree concerning Edward Egerton (27 April 1624).

Returning to England in July 1625, Walter was elected to Parliament for Tamworth in Staffordshire on 20 January 1626. He was appointed to the Warwickshire Committee for Peace that same year.

In 1628 he was present in Parliament as the junior burgess for Tamworth to support the ‘Petition of Rights’ forced on Charles I acknowledging a statement of civil rights in return for support of his finances. In February 1628 he was appointed to help draft a bill to regulate the lieutenancy (24 March 1628) and to consider a measure aimed at preventing bribery and the purchase of judicial office (23 January 1629).

In 1639 the First Bishops' War broke out between Charles I and the Scottish Church. Essex participated, but unlike the previous conflict there is no record that Walter accompanied him. When Parliament was summoned by Charles I on 20 February 1640, Walter Devereux was elected to Commons for Lichfield in East Staffordshire. On 13 April the ‘Short Parliament’ began, but it was dissolved on 5 May after refusing to grant the King money.

As the Second Bishops War ended in disaster, Charles I summoned parliament again on 24 September and Walter Devereux was a member for Lichfield once more. The ‘Long Parliament’ began on 3 November 1640 and Walter Devereux served on the Ship Money Committee and was named one of the Commissioners for Staffordshire in the Scandalous Ministers Act. He continued to be active in Parliament's cause throughout 1641 when he died unexpectedly on 26 July.

== Marriage ==
Walter Devereux's grandmother, Lettice Dudley Countess of Leicester, wrote to Robert Cecil, 1st Earl of Salisbury, in 1608 to assist in arranging his marriage to "Lady Stallenge’s daughter"." This is most likely the daughter of Lady Florence Stallenge. She had two daughters, Margaret and Elizabeth by Sir Christopher Kenn. After he died in 1593, Florence married her second husband, Nicholas Stallenge. The daughter most likely referred to in the letter was Margaret who ended up marrying Sir William Guise in 1608, and died before 1612 after bearing him a single son and heir. Her younger sister, Elizabeth, would marry a few years later to Sir John Paulet. There is no clear evidence that Walter Devereux married.

== Death ==
Devereux died intestate suddenly on 26 July 1641 at Essex House in the Strand. He was buried nearby in the church of St. Clement Danes.

== Sources ==
- Devereux, Walter Bourchier. “Lives and Letters of the Devereux, Earls of Essex.” (London:J Murray, 1853)
- Snow, Vernon F. Essex the Rebel: The Life of Robert Devereux, the Third Earl of Essex, 1591-1646. University of Nebraska Press, 1970. 531 pages
- Thrush, Andrew (editor) and John P. Ferris (editor). "DEVEREUX, Walter (c.1591-1641), of Lamphey, Pemb., Essex House, The Strand, Westminster and Chartley, Staffs." The History of Parliament: the House of Commons 1604–1629. (Cambridge: Cambridge University Press, 2010)

Parliament of England
Preceded by Richard Cuney	Member of Parliament for Pembroke; 1614	Succeeded by Lewis Powell
Preceded by Lewis Powell	Member of Parliament for Pembroke; 1624	Succeeded by Lewis Powell
Preceded by Sir Thomas Puckering; Sir Richard Skeffington	Member of Parliament for Tamworth; 1626–1629; With: Sir Thomas Puckering	Parliament suspended until 1640
Vacant Parliament suspended since 1629	Member of Parliament for Lichfield; 1640–1641; With: Michael Noble	Succeeded by Michael Noble; Sir Richard Cave
