= Robert Southwell (died 1598) =

English politician

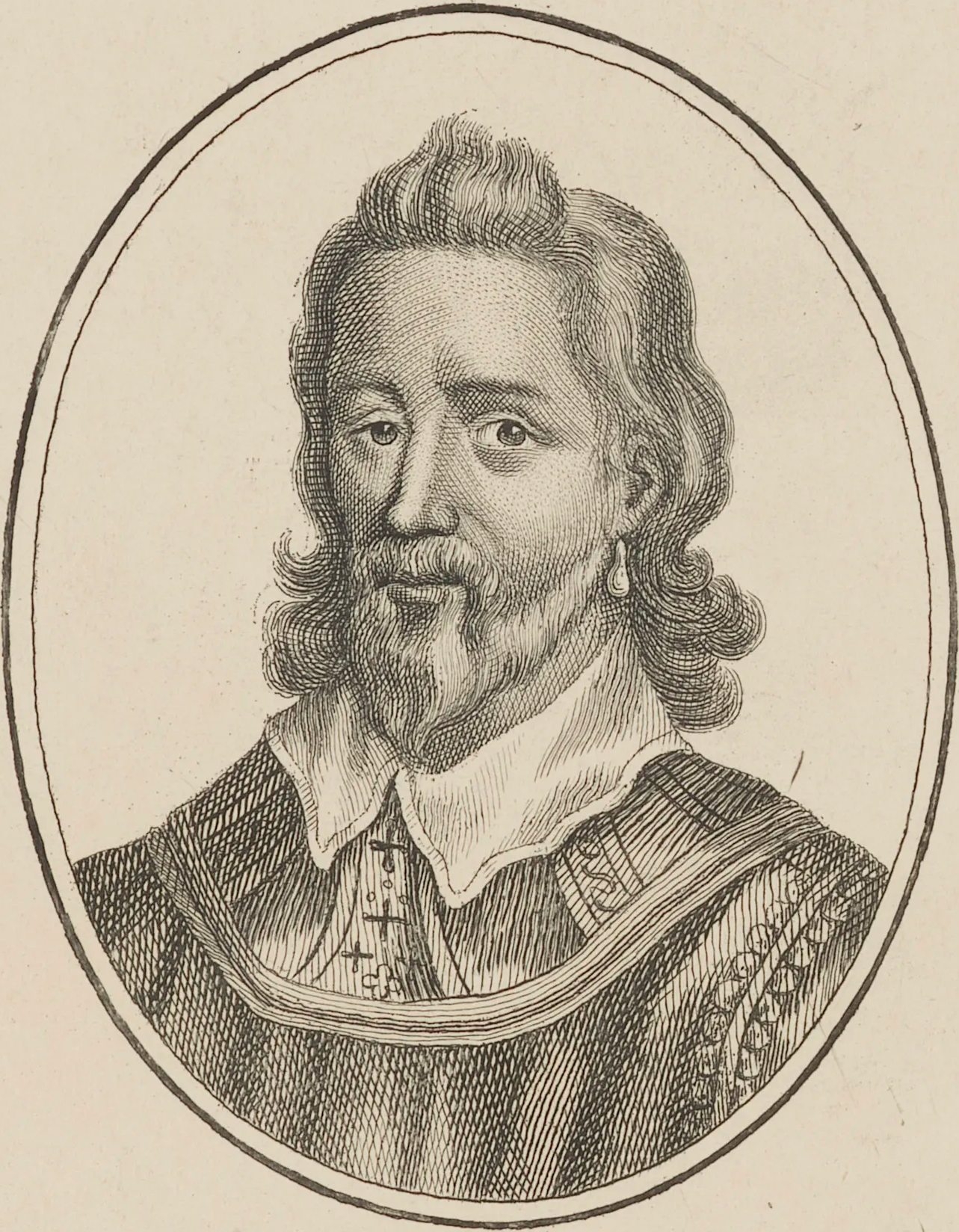
Engraving published by John Thane, after a portrait by Hendrick Cornelisz Vroom in the Armada Tapestries

Sir Robert Southwell (1563–1598), of Woodrising, Norfolk, was an English politician.

Robert was the son of Sir Thomas Southwell and his second wife Mary, daughter of Sir Rice Mansel. Thomas's third wife was Nazaret or Nazareth Newton.

He was High Sheriff of Norfolk for 1589–90 and Vice-Admiral of Norfolk from 1585 to 1598. He was a Member (MP) of the Parliament of England for Guildford in 1597.

Robert was an admiral in 1588 in the battle with the Spanish Armada, in command of the Elizabeth Jonas. His portrait was included in the Armada Tapestries.

In 1591 the Privy Council asked him, as Vice-Admiral, to adjudicate in the case of a Scottish ship belonging to an Edinburgh merchant Archibald Johnston wrecked on the coast of Norfolk.

He died on 12 October 1598 at Woodrising, and was buried on 16 November at Woodrising church. The chief mourner was his cousin Robert Mansell.

== Family ==
Arms of Southwell of Woodrising, Norfolk: Argent, three cinquefoils gules each charged with six annulets or

On 27 April 1583 he married Elizabeth Howard, eldest daughter of Charles Howard, 1st Earl of Nottingham, and a lady in waiting to Queen Elizabeth. They had four sons and four daughters, including:

- Robert Southwell, died 23 September 1586.
- Thomas Southwell (1598-1643) was his heir.
- Charles Southwell (2 February 1588 - 23 April 1588), buried at Reigate where the Howard family lived at Reigate Priory.
- Elizabeth Southwell (1584-1631), maid of honour to Queen Elizabeth from 1 January 1600 in the place of Margaret Ratcliffe. She danced in the masque at the marriage of Henry Somerset, 1st Marquess of Worcester in June 1600. She was also maid of honour to Anne of Denmark, and third wife of Robert Dudley. She wrote an account of the death of Queen Elizabeth. She was buried in San Pancrazio, Florence where there was formerly a Latin inscription including her age, 37 years. Her portrait is drawn in an Italian armorial.
- Frances Southwell, gentlewoman of the privy chamber to Anne of Denmark, married Sir Edward Rodney of Rodney Stoke (1590-1657), Somerset, at Denmark House in May 1614. The Earl of Rutland gave a wedding present of a gilt bowl and cover worth £21.
- Katherine Southwell, gentlewoman of the Privy Chamber to Anne of Denmark, who married Greville Verney, 7th Baron Willoughby de Broke in 1618.

Robert's half-sister, the daughter of Nazaret Newton, Elizabeth Southwell, was a Maid of Honour to Queen Elizabeth. She was a mistress of Robert Devereux, 2nd Earl of Essex and the mother of Walter Devereux. She married Sir Barentine Moleyns or Molyns of Clapcot.
