= Nazareth Newton =

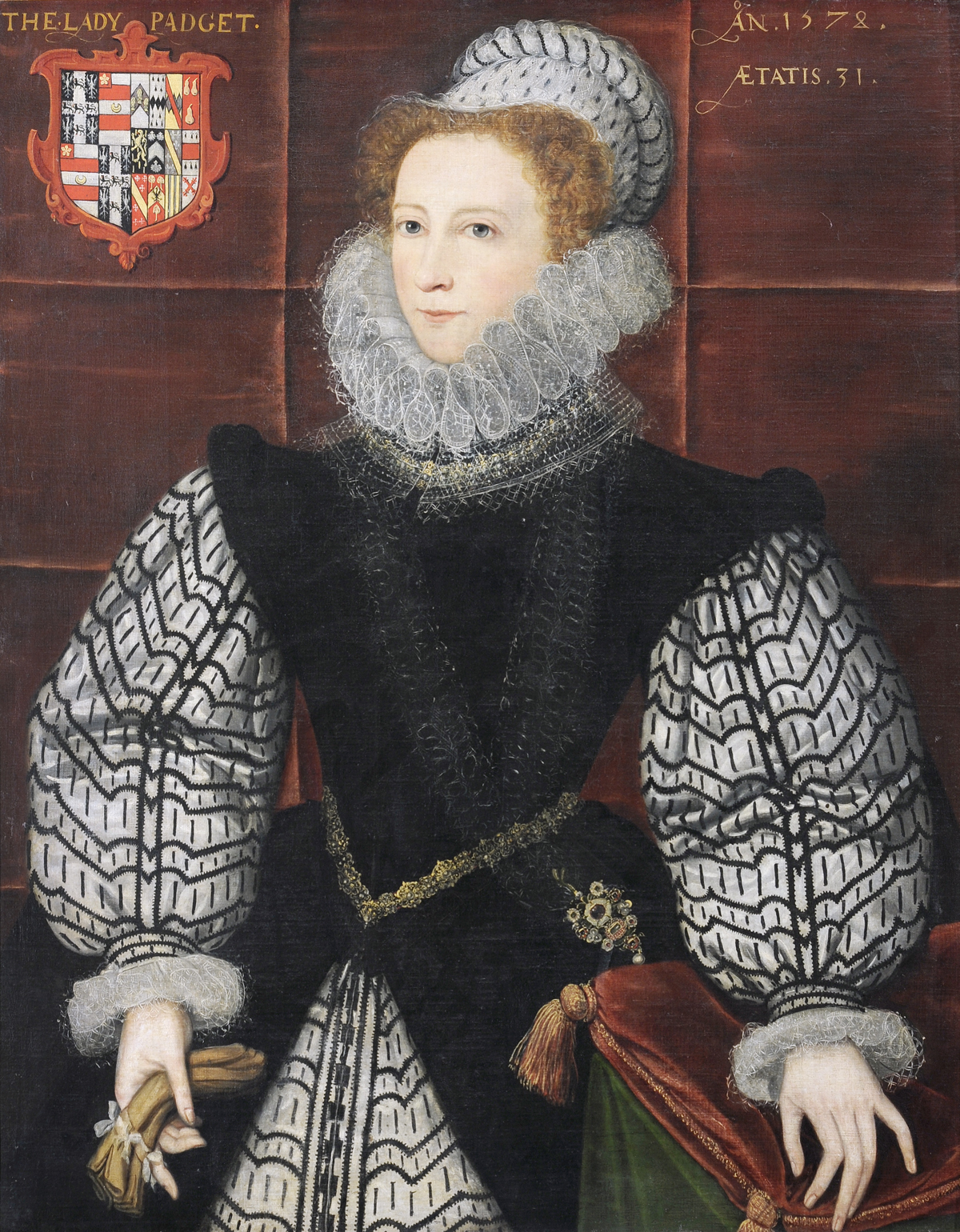
Nazareth Newton as Lady Paget in 1578, Plas Newydd (Anglesey)

Nazareth or Nazaret Newton (died 1583) was an English courtier and lady-in-waiting. She was a chamberer to Queen Elizabeth in the 1560s.

== Early life ==
Nazareth Newton was the youngest daughter of Sir John Newton (d. 1568) of East Harptree, Somerset, and Barrs Court, Gloucestershire, and Margaret, daughter of Sir Anthony Poyntz of Iron Acton and Elizabeth Huddesfield.

At Harptree, the Newton family lived at Eastwood, a house built from the demolished stone of Richmont Castle.

Her sister Frances Newton, who married William Brooke, 10th Baron Cobham, was a lady of the bedchamber.

== Lady Southwell ==
Nazareth Newton was the third wife of Sir Thomas Southwell (d. 1568) of Woodrising, Norfolk.

Their daughter, Elizabeth Southwell, was a Maid of Honour to Queen Elizabeth. She was a mistress of Robert Devereux, 2nd Earl of Essex and mother of Walter Devereux. She married Sir Barentine Moleyns or Molyns of Clapcot. Their son was Michael Molyns.

Thomas Southwell had married Margaret Jernegan, and secondly Mary Mansell, mother of his heir, Robert Southwell (died 1598). In March 1571, Nazareth Southwell was given a gift of properties confiscated from John Eliot, a London merchant.

== Lady Paget ==
After Southwell's death, she married Thomas Paget, 3rd Baron Paget, second son of William Paget, 1st Baron Paget and Anne Preston. They had a son, William Paget, 4th Baron Paget.

Paget dismissed her servants in 1573 after their marriage. Gilbert Talbot wrote that Paget was an "evell husband" after had he hired one of the servants, Margaret Butler, a "sober maiden" to be his wife Mary's servant. As a New Year's Day gift in 1579, she gave the queen a petticoat of cloth of gold "stained" black and white, with gold lace and spangles (sequins) in a pattern like waves of the sea.

Following other disputes, the couple were formally separated in 1582. Lady Paget lived at Woodrising until her death in 1583.
