= Margaret Radclyffe =

English Elizabethan courtier

Margaret Ratcliffe or Radcliffe or Radclyffe (1575-1599) was an English courtier.

== Career ==
She was a maid of honour to Queen Elizabeth. She is sometimes confused with an older courtier, colleague, and cousin Mary Radcliffe, since both were known as "Mistress Ratcliffe".

She was a daughter of Sir John Radcliffe (d. 1590) of Ordsall Hall and Anne Asshawe.

Anthony Munday alias Anthony Gibson dedicated his A Womans Woorth, defended against all the men in the world (London, 1599) with verses to ladies of the Elizabeth court, including; Elizabeth, Countesse of South-hampton, Mistress Anne Russell, Mistress Margaret Ratcliffe, and Mistress Mary Fitten.

Much of the information about the Elizabethan court comes from the letters of Rowland Whyte to Robert Sidney, 1st Earl of Leicester. Whyte noted that on 27 February 1598 "Mrs Radcliffe" wore a white satin gown, all embroidered, richly cut on good cloth of silver, which cost £180. In 1598 a horse known as "Bay Compton" was kept for her to ride in the royal stables.

In August 1599 Whyte heard that Margaret Ratcliffe had stayed in her chamber for four days after Frances Howard, Countess of Kildare had been unkind to her. This was because they were rivals for the affection of Henry Brooke, 11th Baron Cobham. Her brother Alexander had died in Ireland, and she did not yet know it. In the same letter Whyte mentions her cousin Mary Radcliffe as "old Mrs Ratcliffe".

The Earl of Essex wrote to Sir Robert Cecil joking that she had married Sir John Falstaff, a satirical reference to Cobham who was a political rival of Essex and was said to be a descendant of the knight John Oldcastle.

Margaret Radcliffe died on 10 November 1599 at the house of Mr Kirkham in Richmond, after refusing to eat.

Rowland Whyte wrote that now Ratcliffe was dead, Lady Kildare hoped that Lord Cobham would proceed to marry her.

According to Philip Gawdy, a Norfolk lawyer with court connections, she had "gone about to starve herself and by the two days together had received no sustenance". He heard that the Queen was present at her death at Richmond. The maidens at court wore black mourning. There was an autopsy. Queen Elizabeth paid for her funeral. She was buried at St Margaret's, Westminster on 23 November. Her funeral was of the status accorded a nobleman's daughter. 24 poor women were given gowns to match her age. Anne Russell was the chief mourner.

As an epitaph Ben Jonson wrote an acrostic epigram. Her place at court was given to the "faire young Mrs Southwell". She was Elizabeth Southwell, daughter of Sir Robert Southwell and Elizabeth Howard.

In January 1603 the Earl of Rutland paid £4 for a portrait of Margaret Ratcliffe. His accounts show that he was a patron of the artists Nicholas Hilliard and Robert Peake.
