= Kenn, Somerset =

Village in Somerset, England

Coordinates: 51.4174°N 2.8402°W

Kenn
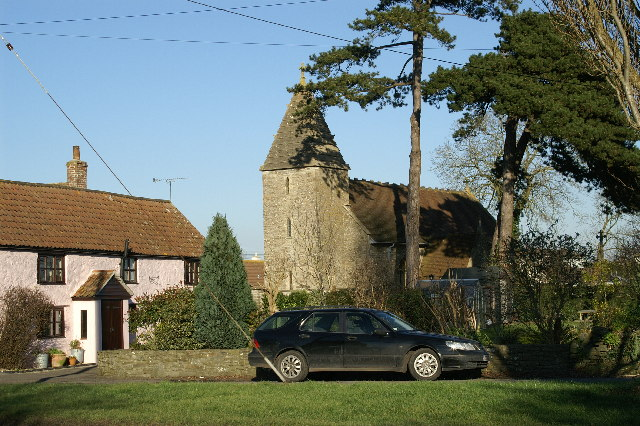
- Church of St John The Evangelist, Kenn

- Location within Somerset
- Population: 431 (2011)
- OS grid reference: ST415695
- Unitary authority: North Somerset
- Ceremonial county: Somerset
- Region: South West
- Country: England
- Sovereign state: United Kingdom
- Post town: CLEVEDON
- Postcode district: BS21
- Dialling code: 01275
- Police: Avon and Somerset
- Fire: Avon
- Ambulance: South Western
- UK Parliament: Wells and Mendip Hills

Kenn is a small village and civil parish in the county of Somerset, England. It falls within the area of the North Somerset unitary authority. It lies on the B3133 road near Clevedon in the North Somerset Levels. The parish has a population of 431.

== History ==
The parish was part of the Winterstoke Hundred.

In the 19th century, Kenn was described as follows: "The village is small and situated in marshy ground. It formerly belonged to the Kenns, one of whom was the nonjuring bishop, composer of the 'Morning Hymn'; he was one of the seven prelates sent to the Tower by James II. The soil is loamy with subsoil clay. The vicarial tithes have been commuted for a rent-charge of £90. The living is a perpetual curacy in the diocese of Bath and Wells, in the patronage of the Vicar of Yatton. The church is a stone structure partially rebuilt in 1861. In the interior are several ancient monuments, among which is that of Christopher Kenn. The register dates from 1543."

Kenn is notable as the site in 1830 of the last public hangings in the UK to be carried out at the scene of the crime. Three arsonists (William Wall, John Rowley and Richard Clarke) who had set fire to a local farmer's hay were hanged, another three being transported to Tasmania.

== Governance ==
The parish council has responsibility for local issues, including setting an annual precept (local rate) to cover the council’s operating costs and producing annual accounts for public scrutiny. The parish council evaluates local planning applications and works with the local police, district council officers, and neighbourhood watch groups on matters of crime, security, and traffic. The parish council's role also includes initiating projects for the maintenance and repair of parish facilities, such as the village hall or community centre, playing fields and playgrounds, as well as consulting with the district council on the maintenance, repair, and improvement of highways, drainage, footpaths, public transport, and street cleaning. Conservation matters (including trees and listed buildings) and environmental issues are also of interest to the council.

The parish falls within the unitary authority of North Somerset which was created in 1996, as established by the Local Government Act 1992. It provides a single tier of local government with responsibility for almost all local government functions within their area including local planning and building control, local roads, council housing, environmental health, markets and fairs, refuse collection, recycling, cemeteries, crematoria, leisure services, parks, and tourism. They are also responsible for education, social services, libraries, main roads, public transport, Trading Standards, waste disposal and strategic planning, although fire, police and ambulance services are provided jointly with other authorities through the Avon Fire and Rescue Service, Avon and Somerset Constabulary and the South Western Ambulance Service.

North Somerset's area covers part of the ceremonial county of Somerset but it is administered independently of the non-metropolitan county. Its administrative headquarters are in the town hall in Weston-super-Mare. Between 1 April 1974 and 1 April 1996, it was the Woodspring district of the county of Avon. Before 1974 that the parish was part of the Long Ashton Rural District.

The parish is represented in the House of Commons of the Parliament of the United Kingdom as part of the Wells and Mendip Hills constituency. It elects one Member of Parliament (MP) by the first past the post system of election, currently Tessa Munt of the Liberal Democratic Party.

== Geography ==
Nearby is the Kenn Church, Kenn Pier & Yew Tree Farm SSSI, a geological Site of Special Scientific Interest which is listed in the Geological Conservation Review because it consists of a complex sequence of Pleistocene sediments, including coarse glacial outwash gravels at the base overlain by a complex sequence of interglacial freshwater, estuarine and marine sands. The sequence is then capped by aeolian (windblown) coversands and Holocene silts.

== Religious sites ==
The Church of St John The Evangelist has a Norman tower, with much of the rest of the church dating from around 1300. It has been designated as a Grade II* listed building.
