= Oatlands Palace =

Former royal palace in Surrey, England

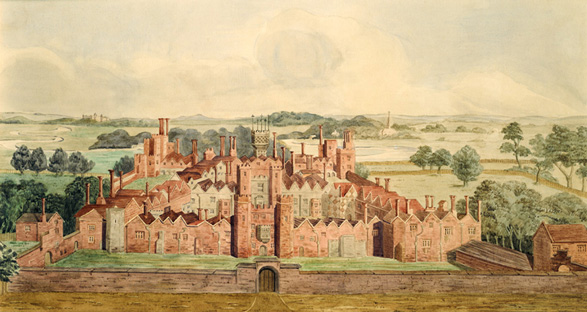
- The original 16th-century Oatlands Palace
- Interactive map of the Oatlands Palace area
- Former names: Manor of Oatlands, Oatlands House

General information
- Status: Demolished, site now occupied by Oatlands Park Hotel
- Type: Royal Palace, later mansion, now hotel
- Architectural style: Tudor, Stuart, Strawberry Hill Gothic
- Location: Oatlands, Weybridge, Surrey, England
- Coordinates: 51°22′30″N 0°26′33″W
- Current tenants: Oatlands Park Hotel
- Year built: 1538 (rebuilt by Henry VIII)
- Renovated: Various, including 1794 (rebuilt after fire), 1830
- Demolished: 1649 (palace), Various (later structures)
- Client: Henry VIII, Anne of Denmark, Henrietta Maria, Frederick, Duke of York and Albany
- Owner: Crown, various private owners

Technical details
- Material: Stone, brick
- Size: 14 hectares (palace)

Design and construction
- Architects: Various, including Inigo Jones, Henry Holland
- Known for: Royal residence, Tudor and Stuart history

Oatlands Palace is a former Tudor and Stuart royal palace which took the place of the former manor of the village of Oatlands near Weybridge, Surrey. Little remains of the original building, so excavations of the palace took place in 1964 to rediscover its extent.

The four-star Oatlands Park Hotel now occupies the site where the post-Commonwealth Oatlands mansion (Oatlands House) once stood. Within the core of the building are some surviving details for earlier stages of its existence. The former site of Oatlands Palace is down the hill towards the centre of Weybridge. This was once part of the lands of the same estate.

== Manor and palace ==
=== Tudors ===
Much of the foundation stone for the palace came from Chertsey Abbey, which was abandoned and fell into ruins after the Dissolution of the Monasteries during the Protestant Reformation in England.

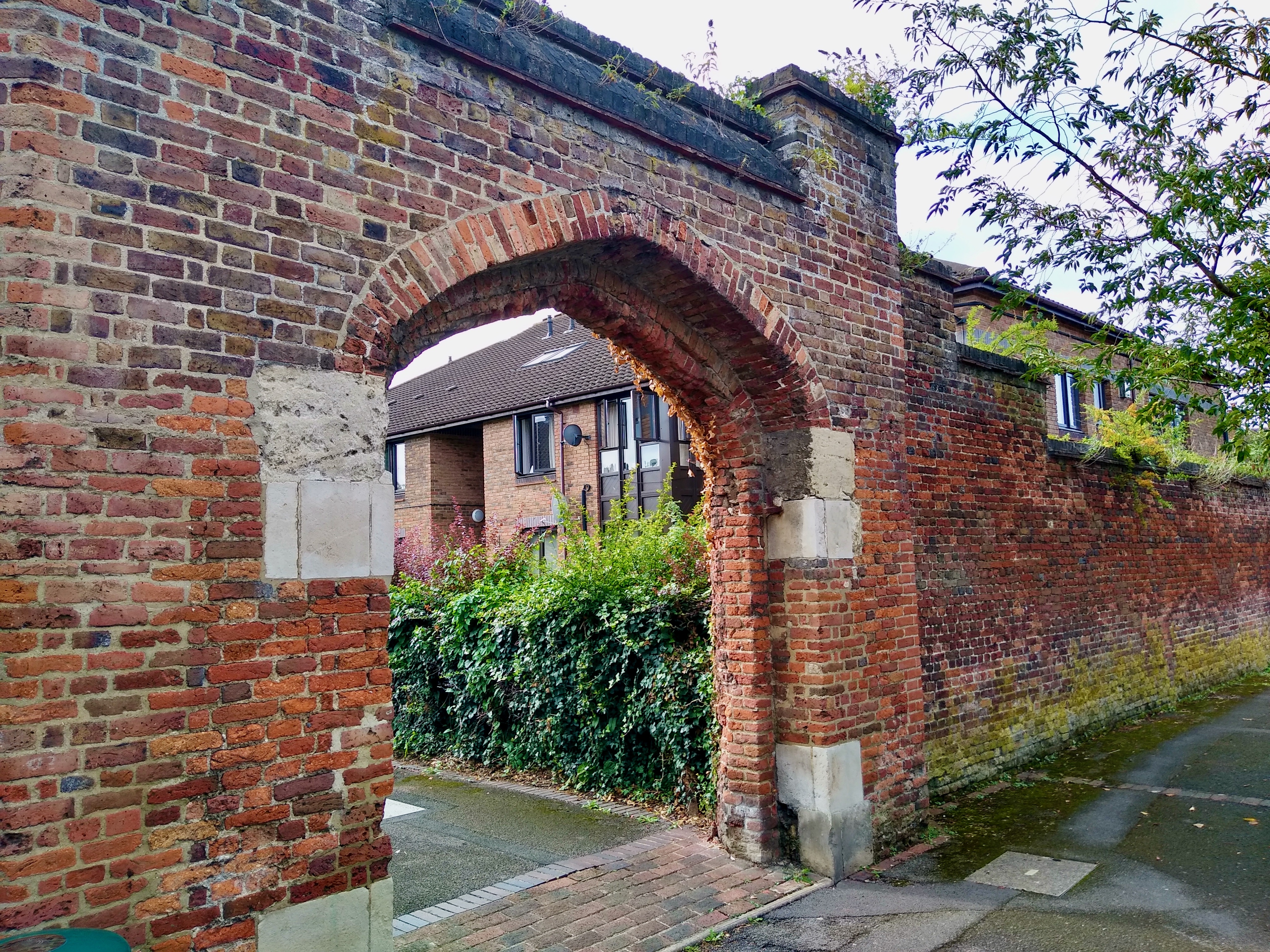
The former entrance gateway still stands and is Grade II-listed.

Henry VIII came to Oatlands on a progress in September 1514 and hunted stags on Chertsey Meads. He acquired the house in 1538, and rebuilt it for Anne of Cleves.

The palace was built around three main adjoining quadrangular courtyards covering fourteen hectares and using an existing 15th-century moated manor house.

A bed made for Anne of Cleves was described in an inventory of Oatlands: Queen Anne's bed" had curtains of crimson cloth of gold and cloth of silver decorated with borders of purple velvet on the seams. It featured 108 embroidered badges of Anne and Henry and their crowned arms on the tester and ceeler.

Henry VIII married Katherine Howard in the palace on 28 July 1540. Henry's subsequent wife, Katherine Parr, spent time at the Palace as well. Records of her writings include a letter sent from Oatlands to her brother, William, Lord Parr, shortly after her marriage to the King in July 1543. Henry VIII was less mobile in his later years and a special ramp was built for him at Oatlands so he could mount his hunting horses.

Mary Tudor retreated to Oatlands after the end of her anticipated pregnancy. Her previous residence, Hampton Court Palace, had housed the nursery staff that was assembled for the birth of the child. The announcement of the move to Oatlands (which was considerably smaller than Hampton) ended any hope at court of a happy outcome to the Queen's pregnancy.

Elizabeth I employed her Sergeant Painter Leonard Fryer to decorate the long gallery with a woodgrain pattern in 1598. After priming the panelling with white lead paint, he painted imitation "flotherwoode", with gold and silver highlights on the mouldings, and arabesque patterns and paintwork of "markatree", perhaps resembling marquetry. Fryer used "sweet varnish" to finish his work, chosen for its scent.

=== Anne of Denmark and her children ===
Prince Henry and Princess Elizabeth were in residence in August 1603. Prince Charles came from Dunfermline Palace to Oatlands in September 1604.

The palace belonged to James I's wife Anne of Denmark from August 1611. She built a silkworm house and a vineyard, and employed Inigo Jones to design an ornamental gateway from the Privy Garden to the Park. Work on site was supervised by Robert Stickells and the Keeper John Trevor. The gardener John Bonnall planted "new and rare fruits, flowers, herbs, and trees". The window of a silkworm house was decorated with the Queen's heraldry. Anne ordered a new garden wall to be rebuilt to make the "French garden" wider.

Her art collection at Oatlands included portraits of her Danish nephews, her courtiers Jane Drummond, Mary Middlemore, and Tom Durie. Her own portrait was painted by Paul van Somer, showing her with her horse, held by an African servant, hunting dogs around her feet, and the new gateway and the palace in the background.

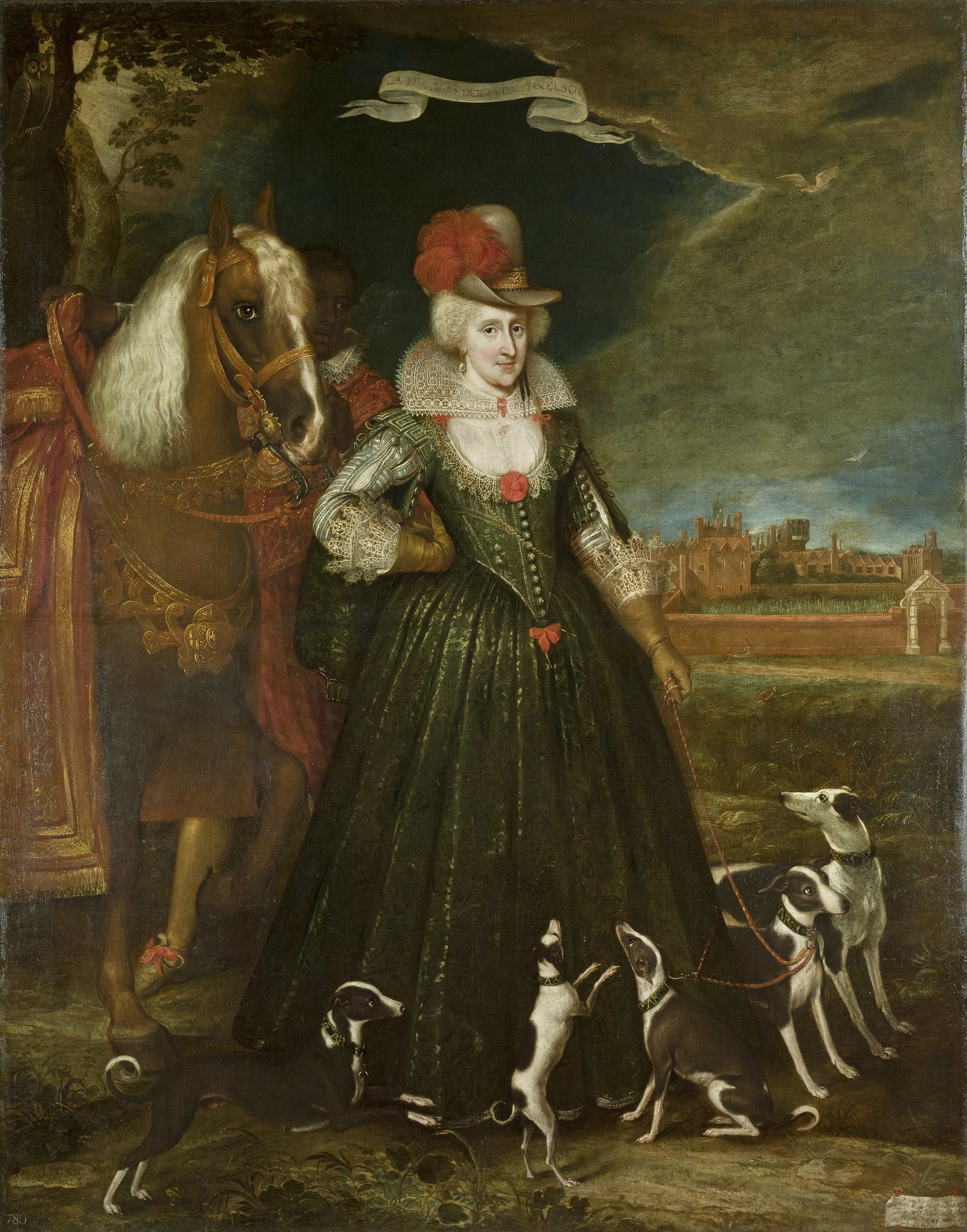
Anna of Denmark and her African servant at Oatlands, Paul van Somer

The queen's bed was "laced with parchment lace of gold and silver spaingled", and the bedchamber was lined with panels of satin laced with coloured silks. Furnishing included painted and gilt Italian style chairs, and other seating was upholstered in red velvet with her initials. Despite this luxury, Anne of Denmark was sometimes bored or melancholy, and wrote to King James that she was "weary of Oatlands, of my mares, of my deer, of my dogs, and of my vineyard". Two paintings from her collection at Oatlands are now held by the Montreal Museum of Fine Arts, depicting Christ and the woman at the well and Christ and the Canaanite woman.

The ambassador of Savoy, Antonio Scanese, Count of Scarnafes, arrived to visit Anne of Denmark at Oatlands on 3 October 1614. She provided a grand reception for the Venetian ambassador Piero Contarini at Oatlands on 30 August 1618. He was welcomed and entertained by her Lord Chamberlain, the Earl of Leicester, while they waited for the arrival of several noblewomen, including Margaret Howard, Countess of Nottingham and the Countess of Arundel. The Queen had planned a hunt, but it was rained off. At the end of the dinner there were sweetmeats, then they stood and toasted Elizabeth, Electress Palatine and Frederick V. For such occasions, the under-keeper Ralph Dison borrowed furnishings from other palaces.

=== Henrietta Maria and her children ===
Oatlands was one of the properties settled upon Henrietta Maria on her marriage to Charles I. She used it as a country retreat, installing part of her art collection on site, employing Ralph Grynder to make new furnishings and John Tradescant the elder to remake the gardens. Henrietta Maria staged a pastoral masque at the palace in August 1635. In August 1637 it was rumoured she was sickening with consumption (tuberculosis, which was frequently fatal as penicillin was not yet discovered). At Oatlands she was drinking asses' (donkeys) milk as a remedy. John Tradescant the Younger became keeper of the gardens in 1639.

In 1646 Oatlands was a temporary home of the infant Princess Henrietta of England, daughter of Charles I of England and later Duchess of Orleans, sister-in-law of Louis XIV. Her governess Lady Dalkeith smuggled her into France in the summer of 1646 during the English Civil War.

== House to hotel ==
=== 1649–1699 ===
After the King was executed, the Commonwealth Government sold Oatlands and some other Royal residences to help pay Parliamentary debts. Robert Turbridge bought Oatlands Palace and its contents for about £4,000. He demolished it and sold the bricks to Sir Richard Weston of Sutton Place.

A single house – remote from the site of the palace itself and possibly originally functioning as a hunting lodge – survived the demolition. After the Restoration, during the 1660s, it was the residence of the pro-Commonwealth William Boteler. He had served as one of the ten major-generals during the Rule of the Major-Generals (1656) and was noted as being harsh on Roman Catholics, Quakers and Cavaliers.

The house was later occupied and extended by Sir Edward Herbert, the Lord Chief Justice. He forfeited it to the Crown when he followed James II into exile. It was awarded to his brother, Arthur Herbert, 1st Earl of Torrington, who was later the admiral in command of the English and Dutch Fleets at the Battle of Beachy Head.

=== 1699–1819 ===
Arthur left the house to Henry Clinton, 7th Earl of Lincoln, whose son Henry Clinton again enlarged it as well as laying out formal gardens. He abandoned it as his main residence when he inherited Clumber Park and sold Oatlands back to the Crown in 1788.

In 1790, Oatlands was leased from the Crown by the Prince Frederick, Duke of York and Albany, the second son of George III. His architect was Henry Holland. In November the following year Frederick and his brother the Prince of Wales hosted composer Joseph Haydn, who stayed for two days, played music for four hours each evening and recorded in his second London notebook:

The little castle, 18 miles from London, lies on a slope and commands the most glorious view. Among its many beauties is a most remarkable grotto which cost £25 000 sterling, and which was 11 years in the building. It is very large and contains many diversions, inter alia actual water that flows in from various sides, a beautiful English garden, various entrances and exits, besides a most charming bath.

The house burned down in 1794 but was quickly rebuilt in Strawberry Hill Gothic style.

=== 1820–present ===
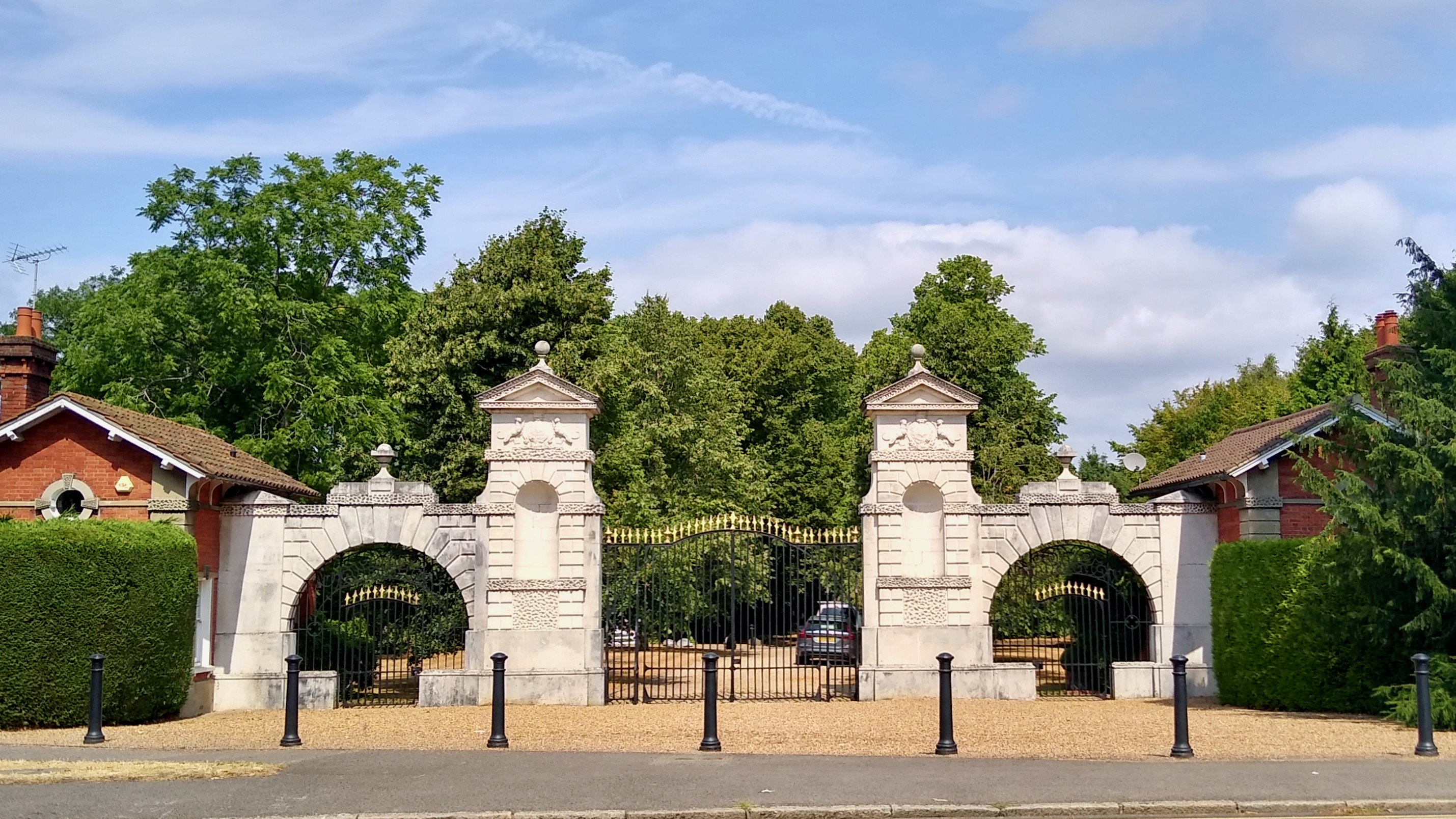
Lodges and entrance gates to Oatlands Park Hotel

After the death of the Duke's estranged wife Frederica in 1820, the whole property was sold. It was bought by Edward Hughes Ball Hughes in 1824 (although it was not until after the Duke's death in 1827 that the sale was finally concluded) and again remodelled in 1830. Hughes had tried to dispose of the estate by public auction in 1829 but this part did not sell.

In 1832 he leased the mansion and adjoining parkland to Lord Francis Egerton for a seven-year period, and renewed the term in 1839. The arrival of the London and South Western Railway in 1838 made it possible for residents to commute daily to London. In 1846 the estate was broken up into lots for building development and sold at three public auctions in May, August and September of that year. Following a period of private ownership by James Watts Peppercorne, the house was adapted and operated as a hotel in 1856, known as the South Western (later Oatlands Park) Hotel.

From 1916 to 1918, during World War I, the British government used the hotel as a hospital for New Zealand troops injured in France. Subsequently, one of the main streets in Walton-on-Thames was renamed New Zealand Avenue in honour of those men.
