= Michael Molyns (died 1615) =

Member of the Parliament of England

Sir Michael Molyns (died 14 May 1615) was a 16th-century English politician.

== Biography ==
Molyns was the younger son of William Molyns of Sandhill Manor at Fordingbridge in Hampshire and Mackney Court at Brightwell-cum-Sotwell in Berkshire (now Oxfordshire) and his wife Ann, daughter of Sir Alexander Culpeper of Bedgebury, Kent. He educated at the Inner Temple (1561). He was knighted circa 1592.

He was a justice of the peace for Oxfordshire from circa 1573, for Berkshire from circa 1575 and for Hampshire from circa 1592. He was appointed High Sheriff of Oxfordshire for 1575–76 and High Sheriff of Berkshire for 1583–84. He was a member (MP) of the Parliament of England for Wallingford in 1589, presumably through the influence of Henry Norris, 1st Baron Norreys.

He inherited Mackney Court in 1553 and married twice: firstly, to Frances, the daughter of Sir Anthony Huddleston of Millom, Cumberland (now Cumbria), with whom he had one son and three daughters; and, secondly, Elizabeth, the daughter and heiress of London Alderman, Edward Gilbert, and widow of Thomas Colby of Sherfield on Loddon in Hampshire. He was the grandfather of 1625 MP, Michael Molyns.
