= Coberly =

Coberly is an English surname. Notable people with the surname include:

- Daniel L. Coberly (born 1954), American author, journalist, historian, and civil servant
- Theodore S. Coberly (1921–2011), American air force brigadier general
