= Clement Walker =

English lawyer, official and politician (died 1651)

Clement Walker (died 1651) was an English lawyer, official and politician. As a member of the Long Parliament, he became an outspoken critic of the conduct of its affairs, and allied himself to William Prynne. Author of the History of Independency, which as a project with several editions included also his Anarchia Anglicana, he was a strong opponent of religious factionalism, and was imprisoned in the Tower of London, where he died without being brought to trial. He used the pseudonym Theodorus Verax (sometimes misprinted "Varax").

== Early life ==
He was born at Cliffe in Dorset, and is said to have been educated at Christ Church, Oxford, but his name does not appear in the matriculation register. In 1611 he became a student of the Middle Temple, being described as son and heir of Thomas Walker, esq., of Westminster. Before the First English Civil War began, Walker was made usher of the exchequer, an office which he held till February 1650.

== In parliament ==
Walker had an estate at Charterhouse, Somerset, and was reputed to be an enemy to Puritans; but on the outbreak of the war he supported the parliamentary cause, and on 1 April 1643 became a member of the parliamentary committee for Somerset. He was advocate to the court-martial which condemned Robert Yeomans and George Bouchier (Bowyer) for seeking to betray Bristol to Prince Rupert, and was at first a strong supporter of Colonel Nathaniel Fiennes as governor of that city. After the surrender of Bristol by Fiennes to Prince Rupert, Walker became his most bitter enemy, co-operated with William Prynne in publishing pamphlets against him, and finally secured his condemnation by a court-martial. One of these pamphlets was complained of by William Fiennes, 1st Viscount Saye and Sele, father of Colonel Fiennes, to the House of Lords, on the ground that it impugned his reputation. Walker was consequently arrested, brought before the house, fined £100, and ordered to pay £500 damages to Lord Say. He refused to make the submission that was also demanded, alleging that it was against the liberty of the subject, and that, as he was a commoner and a member of a committee appointed by the House of Commons, he ought not to be judged by the lords without being heard also by the lower house. He was sent to the Tower (7 October 1643), but released on bail (3 November) after he had petitioned the commons and caused his articles against Fiennes to be presented to them.

Walker was elected member for Wells about the close of 1645, and made himself notorious by his hostility to the Independents. After the triumph of the army over the Presbyterians he was accused of being one of the instigators of the London riots of 20 July 1647. Walker denied this; he described himself in his writings as opposed to all factions, both presbyterians and independents, and never a member of any 'juntos' or secret meetings. In his Mystery of the Two Juntos, published in 1647, he attacked with acrimony the corruption of parliamentary government which the Long Parliament's assumption of all power had produced.

== Expulsion and death ==
In December 1648 Walker was one of the members who voted the king's concessions sufficient ground for an agreement with him, and was consequently expelled from the house by Pride's Purge. He remained under arrest for about a month, which did not prevent him from publishing a protest against the king's trial. On the publication of the second part of his History of Independency, Parliament ordered Walker's arrest and the seizure of his papers (24 October 1649). A few days later (13 November) he was committed to the Tower to be tried for high treason.Walker was never brought to trial, but remained a prisoner in the Tower until his death in October 1651. He was buried in the church of All Hallows, Barking.

== The History of Independency ==
Walker's major work was a composite, consisting of:

- The Mystery of the two Juntos, Presbyterian and Independent, 1647 (reprinted as a preface to the History of Independency);
- The History of Independency, with the Rise, Growth, and Practices of that powerful and restless Faction, 1648, (part i.);
- A List of the Names of the Members of the House of Commons, observing which are Officers of the Army contrary to the Self-denying Ordinance, 1648 (subsequently incorporated in part i. of the History of Independency.);
- A Declaration and Protestation of W. Prynne and C. Walker against the Proceedings of the General and General Council of the Army, 1649, and Six serious Queries concerning the King's Trial (both reprinted in the second part of the History of Independency).;
- Anarchia Anglicana, or the History of Independency, the second part, 1649;
- The High Court of Justice, or Cromwell's New Slaughter House in England, being the third part of the " History of Independency," written by the same Author, 1651.

The History of Independency and Anarchia Anglicana were published under the pseudonym of Theodorus Verax. One particular aim of the work was to show up the Anglia Rediviva of 1647, by Joshua Sprigge (and perhaps others), as myth-making in its account of the civil war just ended. The Anarchia was answered by George Wither in Respublica Anglicana, where he alleges that the author is Verax (truth-telling) on the title-page but not in the others.

According to John Aubrey, who derived his information from one of Walker's fellow prisoners, Walker wrote a continuation of his 'History' giving an account of the king's coming to Worcester, which was lost. A fourth part of the History was added by a certain T. M., who published it with the preceding three parts in one volume (1661). In this volume is Walker's often quoted criticism of the democrats of the English civil war, in reference to spreading an awareness of meritocracy and the workings of government: "They have made the people thereby so curious and arrogant that they will never find humility enough to submit to a civil rule." An abridgment in Latin of part of the History of Independency, entitled Historia Independentiae, is included in Sylloge Variorum Tractatuum, 1649, and in Metamorphosis Anglorum, 1653.
