= Elizabeth Southwell (courtier) =

English courtier (1584–1631)

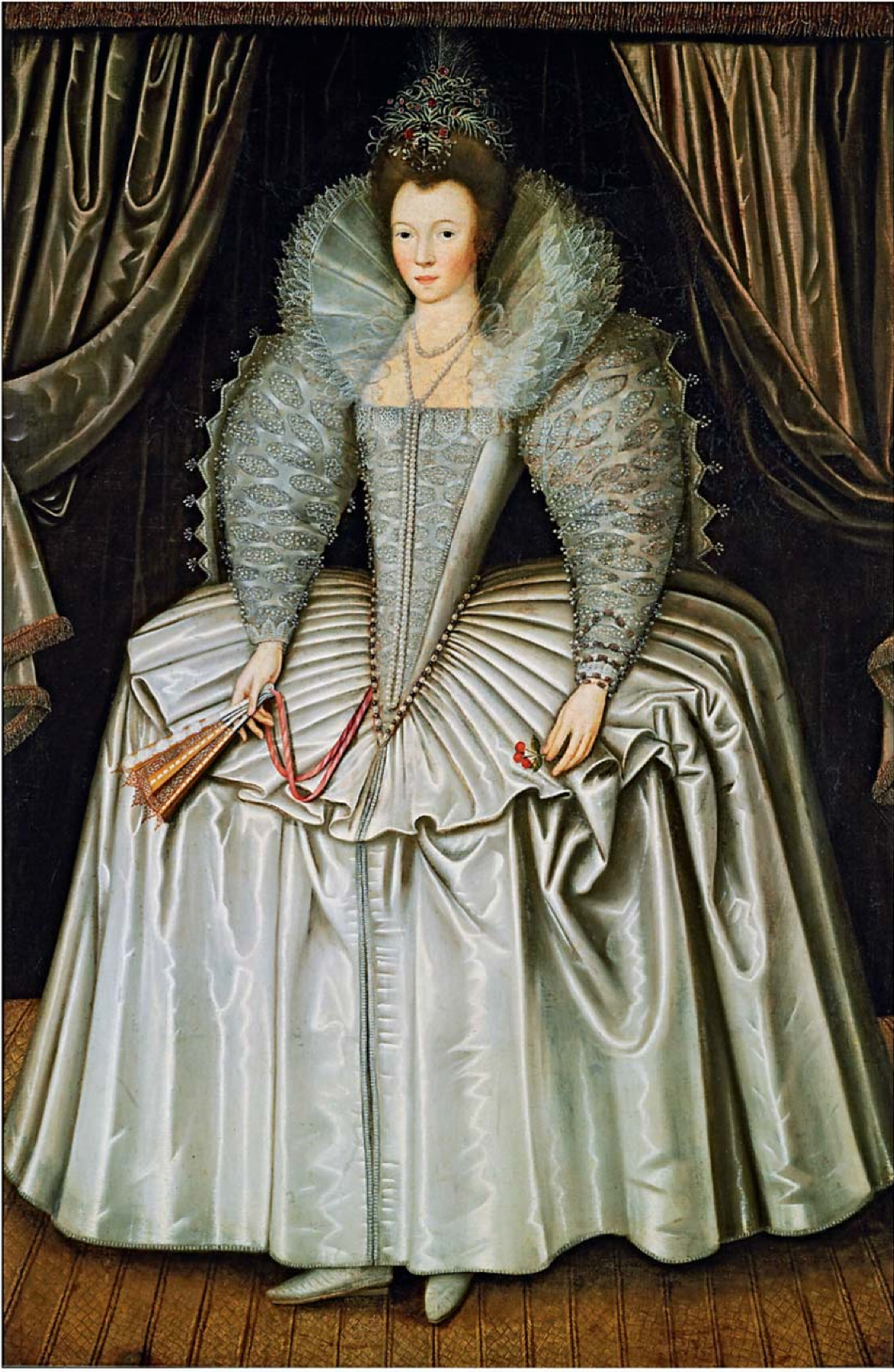
Portrait thought to be Elizabeth Southwell, c. 1600

Elizabeth Southwell (1584–1631) was an English courtier who lived in Florence.

She was a daughter of Sir Robert Southwell and Elizabeth Howard, and a granddaughter of Charles Howard, 1st Earl of Nottingham.

She was appointed maid of honour to Queen Elizabeth in 1599 to replace Margaret Ratcliffe, and joined the court in January 1600. She danced in the masque at the marriage of Anne Russell and Henry Somerset, 1st Marquess of Worcester in June 1600. The other dancers, led by Mary Fitton, were Lady Dougherty (Dorothy Hastings), Mistress Carey, Mistress Onslow (Cordell Annesley), Bess Russell, Mistress Darcy, and Blanche Somerset. They wore skirts of cloth of silver, waiscoats embroidered with coloured silks and silver and gold thread, mantles of carnation taffeta, and "loose hair about their shoulders" which was also "curiously knotted and interlaced". Southwell also took part in the Harefield Entertainment in August 1602.

She wrote an account of the death of Queen Elizabeth. The narrative mentions her great-aunt Lady Scrope. Southwell was also maid of honour to Anne of Denmark. A letter of the Earl of Worcester describing the household in 1604 mentioned that "of late the Lady Sothwell [is] for the drawing chamber". Her mother also joined the queen's household for a time.

She left England with her cousin Robert Dudley, the son of Douglas, Lady Sheffield and the Earl of Leicester, in 1605. Rowland Whyte heard that Dudley had lodged Southwell and her servant Mistress Rice in a nunnery at Brussels. She married him in Lyon. The validity of the marriage was questioned in English law, and also, according to John Chamberlain, by the Pope. Sir Francis Leake wrote, "if he do marry Mrs Southwell, it is felony by these last statutes".

Their daughter Anne died in 1629.

She died in 1631 and was buried in San Pancrazio, Florence where there was formerly a Latin inscription including her age, given as 37 years. Her portrait was drawn in an Italian armorial.
