= Woodrising, Norfolk =

Village in Norfolk, England

Coordinates: 52°35′27″N 0°56′01″E

Woodrising
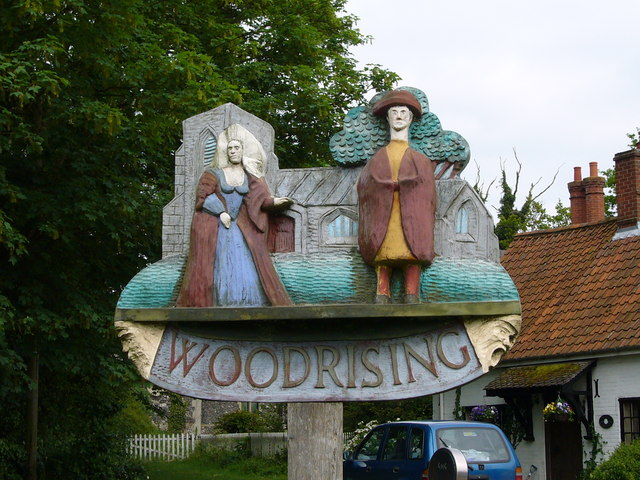

- Location within Norfolk
- Civil parish: Cranworth
- District: Breckland
- Shire county: Norfolk
- Region: East
- Country: England
- Sovereign state: United Kingdom

Woodrising is a village and former civil parish, now in the parish of Cranworth, in the Breckland district, in the county of Norfolk, England. The village of Woodrising is south of Dereham. In 1931 the parish had a population of 103.

The parish church of St Nicholas dates mainly to the 14th century, its tower collapsing in the early 18th century. The bell frame (bell-cot or bell-cote), with a thatched roof, is preserved nearby, although the bell within it may be of 19th century origin.

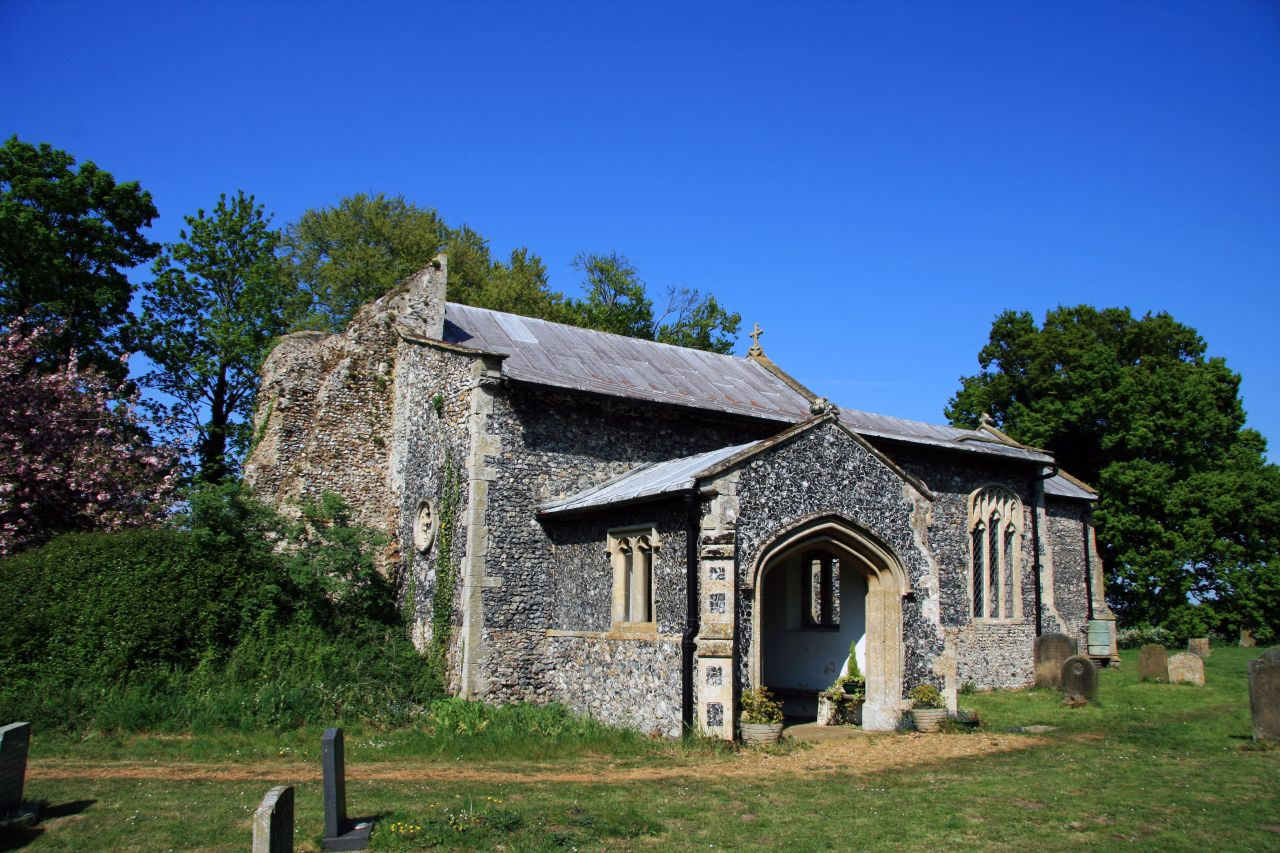
St Nicholas, Woodrising

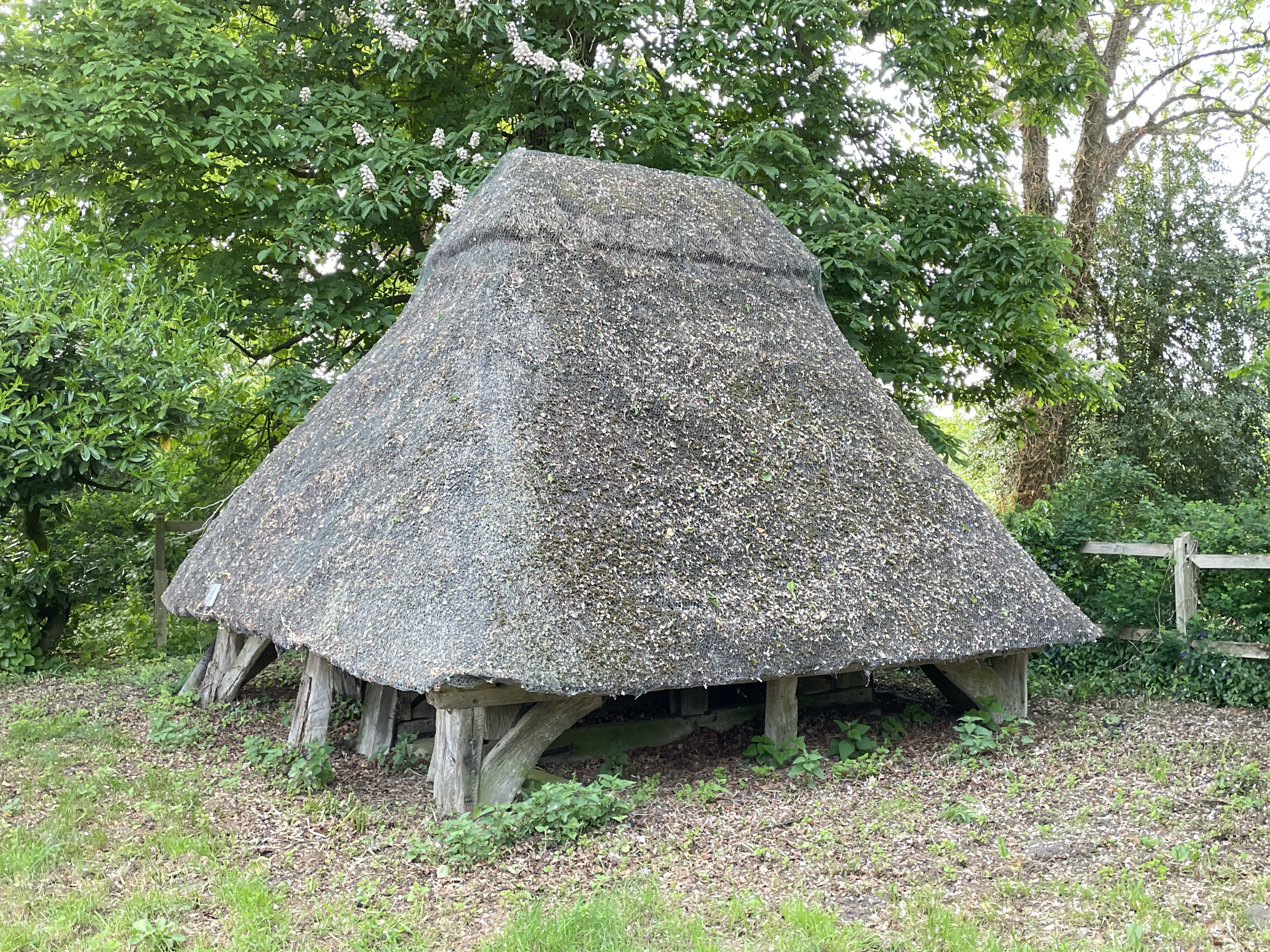
Thatched bell-cote

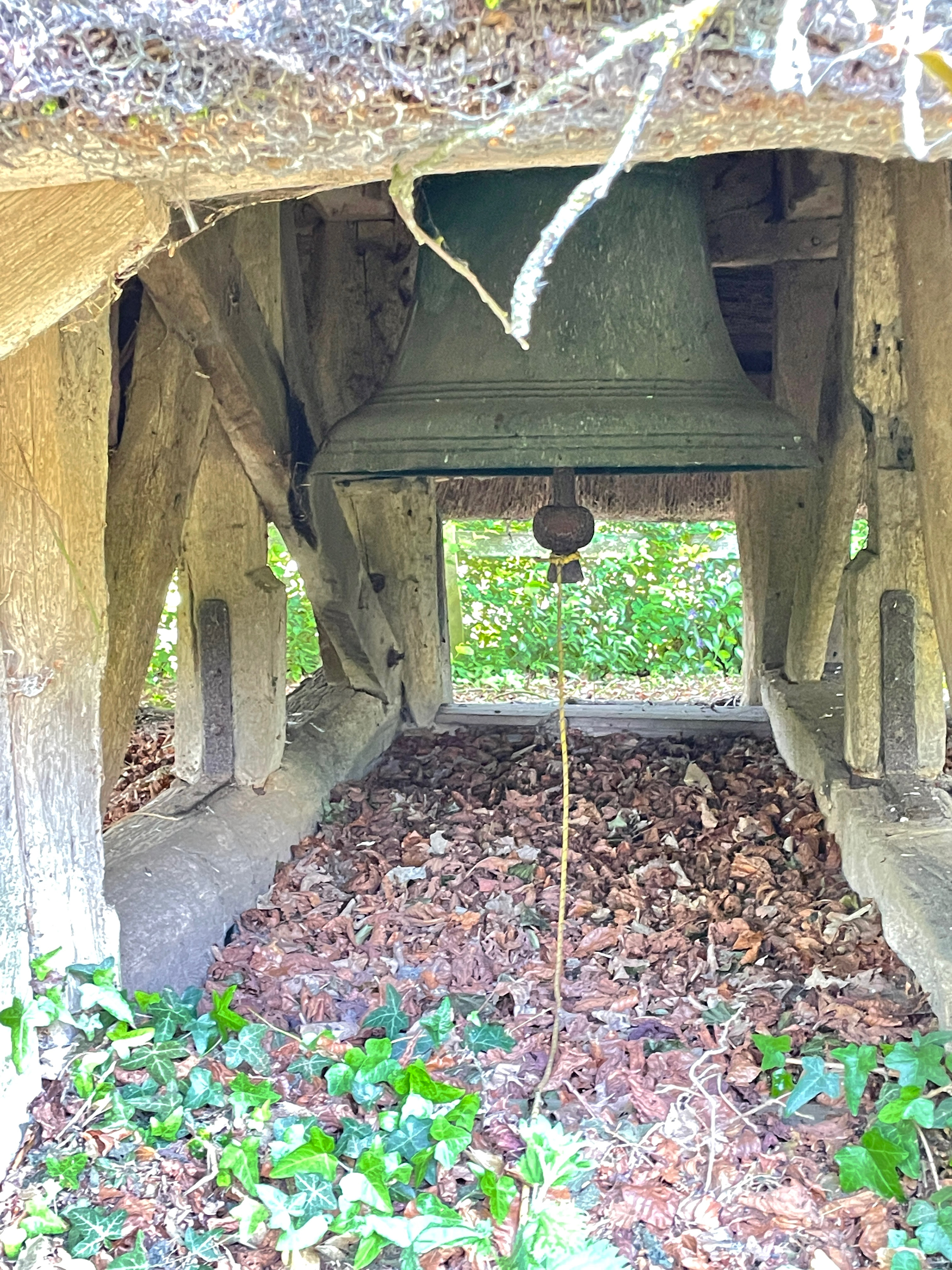
19th century bell in the bell-cote

== History ==
The villages name means 'Risa's people' or perhaps, 'Brushwood place' or 'people of the brushwood'. 'Wood' was a 13th century addition.

The lords of the manor were the De Rising family, followed by the Southwell family, owners of Woodrising Hall, including Sir Richard Southwell (d. 1563) whose tomb is within the church, Sir Robert Southwell (d. 1598), and Thomas Southwell who sold the family estates to Francis Crane.

The old Hall was demolished in the 18th-century leaving a moated site. Queen Elizabeth stayed at the Hall for four days in 1578. She travelled from Kimberley and went on to Thetford.

It was formerly in the Mitford Hundred. On 1 April 1935 the parish was abolished and merged with Cranworth.
