= Edward Phillips (disambiguation) =

Edward Phillips (1630–c. 1696) was an English author.

Edward, Eddie, Ed, or Ted Phillips or Philips may also refer to:

== Arts and entertainment ==
- Eddie Phillips (actor) (1899–1965), American actor
- Edward O. Phillips (1931–2020), Canadian novelist
- Eddie Phillips (musician) (born 1942), British musician
- Ed Phillips (born 1966), Australian TV-radio presenter

== Sports ==
=== Baseball ===
- Eddie Phillips (catcher) (1901–1968), American baseball catcher
- Eddie Phillips (pinch runner) (1930–2010), American baseball player for the St. Louis Cardinals
- Ed Phillips (pitcher) (1944–2017), American baseball player for the Boston Red Sox

=== Cricket ===
- Edward Phillips (cricketer, born 1851) (1851–1933), Australian cricketer
- Edward Phillips (cricketer, born 1883) (1883–1915), Welsh cricketer
- Edward Phillips (cricketer, born 1892) (1892–1971), Australian cricketer

=== Other sports ===
- Eddie Phillips (boxer) (1911–1995), English boxer
- Eddie Phillips (Australian footballer) (born 1931), Australian rules footballer for Footscray
- Ted Phillips (footballer) (1933–2018), English professional footballer
- Eddie Phillips (basketball) (born 1961), American basketball player
- Eddie Phillips (quarterback) (fl. 1969–1971), American football quarterback
- Ted Phillips (fl. 1984–present), American football executive
- Ed Phillips (footballer) (born 1998), Australian rules footballer for St Kilda

== Others ==
- Edward Phillips (British Army officer) (1889–1973), British World War II general and medical officer
- Edward H. Phillips (fl. 1980s–present), American aviator and aviation historian
- Ted Philips (born 1983), American politician in Massachusetts

== See also ==
- Edward Phelips (disambiguation)
