= William Strode III (of Barrington) =

English landowner and Member of Parliament

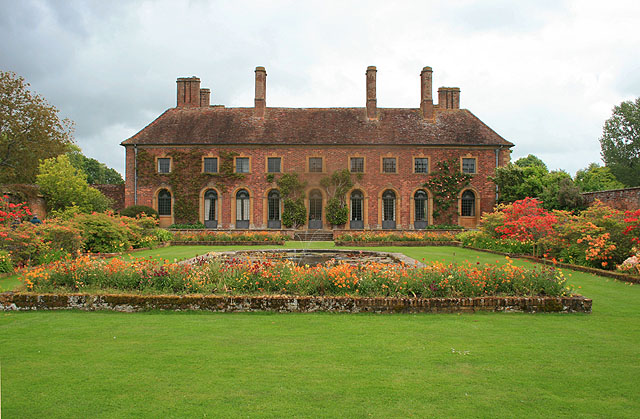
Strode House at Barrington Court, Somerset, England. It was built by William Strode II in 1674.

William Strode II (1622 in London – 19 February 1694 in Barrington, Somerset, England) was a wealthy English landowner, Member of Parliament (1679, Ilchester), and aider of the Duke of Monmouth in the Monmouth Rebellion (1685).

== Biography ==
Strode was the eldest son of Colonel William Strode Jr (1589–1666) who was an English Parliamentarian officer, an MP (Ilchester; 1640, 1646–1648), and a very wealthy cloth merchant from Shepton Mallet, Somerset. His mother was Joan Barnard (1607–1649), heiress of the equally wealthy Barnard family.

William III inherited estates at Glastonbury Manor and at Barrington Court from his father in his native county of Somerset. At the latter he built Strode House (1674). His three marriages were to Elizabeth Rivett (1656), Margaret Osborne (1675) and, thirdly, to Jane Ellys. His only sons were William IV (1675–1746) and Barnard (1695–1782), both by his third wife.

William III served as MP for Ilchester in 1679. In 1680, and subsequently, he supported the rebellion of his friend James Scott, 1st Duke of Monmouth (1649–1685), entertaining the pretender to the throne several times at Barrington and providing him with horses and money. In 1686, after the disastrous Battle of Sedgemoor and the execution of the Duke, William was pardoned for his treason. As was the case with many of his wealthy relatives—such as his brother Edward (1629–1703) of Downside near Shepton Mallet—this was possible only by dint of massive payments of gold coin to King James II. There is no evidence that anyone on the William Strode III estates was executed, but remains of many dead (because less affluent) Somerset rebels were displayed at this time of the "Bloody Assizes".

Parliament of England
Preceded by Edward Phelips 1661; Henry Dunster 1661	Member of Parliament for Ilchester; 1679; With: John Speke	Succeeded by Sir John St Barbe 1681; John Hody 1681
