= Phelips =

Phelips is a surname. Notable people with the surname include:

- Edward Phelips (disambiguation), multiple people
- Robert Phelips (c. 1586–1638), English politician
- William Phelip (died 1441), English politician

== See also ==
- Phelps (surname)
