= Sir Robert Brown, 1st Baronet, of Westminster =

British politician and merchant

Sir Robert Brown, 1st Baronet (died 5 October 1760) was a British politician and merchant.

He was the son of William Brown and Grisel Brice and for some time a merchant and King George II's resident in Venice. On 11 March 1731, he was made a baronet, of the City and Liberty of Westminster, with a special remainder failing own issue male, to his two brothers James and Edward, and their heirs male.

From 1734 to 1747, Brown was Member of Parliament (MP) for Ilchester. In 1741, he was appointed Paymaster of His Majesty's works. Brown married Margaret Cecil, sister of Charles Cecil, Bishop of Bristol and then Bangor. They had two daughters and so he was succeeded in the baronetcy according to the special remainder by his nephew James O'Hara. Brown was buried in Audley Street Chapel in London, five days after his death.

Parliament of Great Britain
Preceded by Thomas Crisp; Charles Lockyer	Member of Parliament for Ilchester; 1734 – 1747; With: Charles Lockyer	Succeeded by Francis Fane; Thomas Lockyer
Baronetage of Great Britain
New creation	Baronet (of Westminster); 1731–1760	Succeeded by James O'Hara Brown
