= Church of St Mary the Virgin, Whitelackington =

Church in Somerset, England

Church of St Mary the Virgin
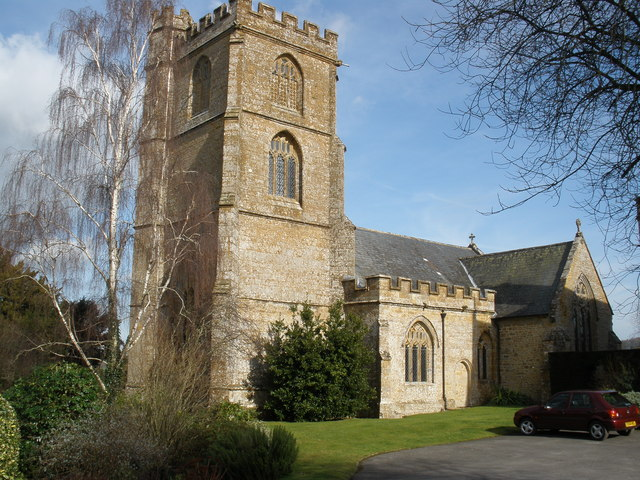

- Location within Somerset
- 50.9335°N 2.8843°W
- Location: Whitelackington, Somerset, England

History
- Built: 14th and 15th centuries

Listed Building – Grade II*
- Official name: Church of St Mary the Virgin
- Designated: 4 February 1958
- Reference no.: 1057033

The Anglican Church of St Mary the Virgin in Whitelackington, Somerset, England was built in the 14th and 15th centuries. It is a Grade II* listed building.

== History ==
The church was built during the 14th and 15th centuries.

Rev.F.C.Johnson was vicar from 1825-1874.

The parish is part of the benefice of Ilminster and Whitelackington within the Diocese of Bath and Wells.

== Architecture ==
The hamstone building has slate roofs. The lead of the roof contains images of hands, feet, shoes and names carved into it, the oldest dating back to 1689.

The church consists of a four-bay nave and two-bay chancel which have corner buttresses. The four-stage west tower is also supported by buttresses. The stained glass in the east window is by Charles Eamer Kempe and was installed in 1896.

The interior fittings include a 14th-century piscina in the north transept, and in the east wall there is a richly decorated statue niche. Monuments include two defaced effigies on the floor of the south transept, a civilian of around 1350 and a knight in armour of 1375. The tomb of Sir George Speke is in Perpendicular style. There is also a monument to John Hanning, who died in 1807, which is by J. Richards of Exeter. The Speke family were the lord of the manor and controlled church and village life. Probably the best known is John Hanning Speke.

== See also ==
- List of ecclesiastical parishes in the Diocese of Bath and Wells
