= Edward Phelips =

Edward Phelips may refer to:

- Sir Edward Phelips (speaker) (c. 1555/60–1614), English lawyer and politician, Speaker of the English House of Common and subsequently Master of the Rolls
- Sir Edward Phelips Jr. (1638–1699), English landowner and politician who sat in the House of Commons at various times between 1661 and 1699
- Edward Phelips (Royalist) (1613–1680), English landowner and politician who sat in the House of Commons at various times between 1640 and 1679
- Edward Phelips (died 1797) (1725–1797), English country landowner and politician

== See also ==
- Edward Phillips (disambiguation)
