= General Paget =

General Paget may refer to:

- Arthur Paget (British Army officer) (1851–1928), British Army general
- Bernard Paget (1887–1961), British Army general
- Edward Paget (1775–1849), British Army general
- Lord George Paget (1818–1880), British Army general
- Henry Paget, 1st Marquess of Anglesey (1768–1854), British Army general
- Thomas Paget (British Army officer) (died 1741) was a British Army brigadier general
