= Mary Speke =

17th century British political activist

- Born: Mary Pye c. 1625
- Died: 1697 (aged 71–72)
- Known for: politics, once reported as "most dangerous woman in the West"
- Spouse: George Speke
- Children: several including Hugh Speke

Mary Speke (née Pye) (c. 1625 – 1697) was an English nonconformist patron and political activist. She lived in Somerset in a non-conformist family. She was credited with changing her husband's political opinions and the Bishop of Bath and Wells reported her to the Secretary of State as "the most dangerous woman in the West".

== Life ==
Speke was born as Mary Pye. Her parents were Mary (born Croker) and Sir Robert Pye of Faringdon in Berkshire, who was an Auditor of the Receipt of the Exchequer. Her elder brother and her father's heir Robert Pye was a parliamentarian. Speke may have been baptised on 10 November 1625.

She married George Speke on 21 May 1641. They lived at Whitelackington in Somerset. Her husband's switch from Royalist to supporter of the emerging Whig Party has been attributed to her. Their youngest daughter Philip [sic] married the politician John Trenchard. There were nine children of Mary and George's marriage, of whom three died at a young age and five became political followers of their parents, including Hugh Speke.

Mary appears to have made a particular enemy of Peter Mews who was the Bishop of Bath and Wells. He saw it as his role to report on the non-conformist well-to-do families in his diocese. He gave the Speke family particular attention and focused on Mary. It is unknown why he singled out Mary when other members of her family were in contact with known rebels and her husband was known for openly insulting the King and Queen. The bishop told Secretary of State Leoline Jenkins that "there is not a more dangerous woman in the West" in July 1683 and warned him that she was then in London. She was considered responsible for organising conventicles and encouraging dissent across the West Country.

She was arrested several times, possibly because the authorities were suspicious of her frequent trips to London and her correspondence with other dissenters. Her reputation was similar to that of Elizabeth Gaunt who was burnt in 1685, but Gaunt was a shopkeeper whereas Speke was well connected. Her fourth son, Charles, was executed after Monmouth's Rebellion in 1685; the rest of the family were pardoned after a payment of £5,000.

Speke died in 1697.
