= Henry Dunster (MP) =

English merchant and politician

Henry Dunster (1618 – 29 July 1684) was an English merchant and politician who sat in the House of Commons from 1660 to 1679.

Dunster was the son of Giles Dunster, yeoman, of Seavington St. Michael, Somerset and was baptised on 6 September 1618. He was apprenticed to a grocer in London in 1636, and became a freeman of the Worshipful Company of Grocers in 1644. He does not appear to have taken part in the Civil War. By 1652 he owned 52 acres in Ilchester and was elected to the corporation. In 1660, he was elected Member of Parliament for Ilchester in the Convention PArliament. He was a commissioner for assessment for London from August 1660 to 1680. In 1661 he was re-elected MP for Ilchester in the Cavalier Parliament. He was commissioner for assessment for Somerset from 1664 to 1669 and for Hertfordshire from 1664 to 1680. He was warden of the Grocers’ company from 1668 to 1669 and master of the company from 1669 to 1670. He sold his property in Ilchester in 1674 but was commissioner for recusants for Somerset in 1675. He stood for parliament unsuccessfully at Hertford in the second general election of 1679.

Dunster died of an epidemic fever at the age of 66 and was buried at All Saints, Hertford.

Dunster married Mary Gardiner daughter of Henry Gardiner of Jenningsbury in about May 1655. They had six sons and two daughters. His wife died on 10 October 1718.

Parliament of England
Preceded by Not represented in the restored Rump Parliament	Member of Parliament for Ilchester; 1660–1679; With: Robert Hunt 1660; Edward Phelips 1661–1679	Succeeded by William Strode; John Speke
