= Charles Lockyer =

British Whig politician

Charles Lockyer (died 1752) of Ilchester, Somerset and Ealing, Middlesex, was a British Whig politician who sat in the House of Commons from 1727 to 1747.

Lockyer was the eldest son of Thomas Lockyer of Ilchester, and his wife Elizabeth. He belonged to a dissenting family, who owned property at Ilchester.

Lockyer was a chief accountant in the South Sea Company, and gave evidence to the secret House of Commons committee set up to inquire into the South Sea bubble. He was returned unopposed as Whig Member of Parliament for Ilchester at the 1727 British general election. He was returned after a contest at the 1734 British general election, and was unopposed again at the 1741 British general election. He voted consistently with the Government. At the 1747 British general election, he stood down in favour of his younger brother Thomas.

Lockyer died unmarried of a paralytic disorder on 13 February 1752. He left property in his will to his sister Mary Maby, his cousin Thomas Lockyer, and an illegitimate son John Lockyer, born to Ann Green, a servant.

Parliament of Great Britain
Preceded by Thomas Paget; Daniel Moore	Member of Parliament for Ilchester; 1727–1747; With: Thomas Crisp 1727-1734; Sir Robert Brown 1734-1747	Succeeded by Francis Fane; Thomas Lockyer
