= Peter Legh (1723–1804) =

English landowner and politician (1723-1804)

Member of Parliament for Ilchester
- In office 1765–1774 Serving with William Wilson, Sir Brownlow Cust, Bt
- Preceded by: Joseph Tolson Lockyer; William Wilson
- Succeeded by: Peregrine Cust; William Innes

Personal details
- Born: 4 March 1723
- Died: 12 August 1804 (aged 81)
- Spouse(s): Anne Wade (m. 1744; died 1794) Mrs. Mountain (died 1804)
- Relations: Sir Willoughby Aston, 2nd Baronet (grandfather)
- Children: 7
- Parent(s): Thomas Pennington Legh; Helena Aston

Peter Legh (4 March 1723 – 12 August 1804) was an English landowner and politician.

== Early life ==
Legh was born on 4 March 1723. He was the only child and heir of Capt. Thomas Pennington Legh (c. 1680–1743) of Norbury Booths Hall, near Knutsford, Cheshire, and his second wife, Helena Aston (1691–after 1752). His father was previously married, and widowed, to Ruth Legh (the only daughter of Peter Legh of Booths), who died in 1716. His father adopted Ruth's surname to inherit the estate.

His paternal grandparents were Dr. Allen Pennington and Anne (née Legh) Pennington. His maternal grandparents were Sir Willoughby Aston, 2nd Baronet and the former Mary Offley. Through his uncle, Sir Thomas Aston, 3rd Baronet, he was a first cousin of Sir Thomas Aston, 4th Baronet, MP for Liverpool and St Albans. Through his uncle Richard Aston, he was a grandfather of Sir Willoughby Aston, 5th Baronet (who married Elizabeth Pye, a daughter of Henry Pye of Faringdon House and sister to Admiral Sir Thomas Pye). Through his grand-uncle, John Offley of Madeley Manor, Staffordshire, his mother was a first cousin of John Offley Crewe, MP for Cheshire.

== Career ==
He succeeded to his father's estate in 1743, making him head of one of the oldest Cheshire families, the parent house of the Leghs of Lyme. Legh was involved in major building works at Norbury Booths, having a "spacious mansion" finished in 1745 (although it could be 1755).

At the election on 26 April 1765, Legh was successfully returned as a Member of Parliament for Ilchester. In 1768 he was returned unopposed. Legh did not stand in 1774.

== Personal life ==
On 20 December 1744, he married Anne Wade (1724–1794), eldest daughter and co-heiress of Peter Wade of Middlewich, Cheshire. Before her death on 13 October 1794, they were the parents of four sons and two daughters, including:

- Peter Pennington Legh (1745–c. 1777), who died in Hackney.
- Thomas Legh (1746–1790), who died in Calcutta, India.
- Willoughby Legh (1749–1824), who died unmarried.
- Anna Helena Legh (1750–1793), who married Capt. John Matthews of the Royal Navy in 1792.
- John Legh (1752–1826), who married Isabella Dawson, daughter and co-heiress of Edmund Dawson of Wharton, Lancashire. Her sister, Alice Dawson, was the wife of Dr. William Long.
- Mary Legh (1755–1777), who died unmarried.

After the death of his first wife, he married Mrs. Mountain, with whom he had a natural daughter, born out of wedlock:

- Elizabeth Matilda Legh (1779–1828), who married the Rev. Peter Halstead, Rector of Grappenhall, Cheshire (and brother of Domville Halstead Poole of Lymm Hall), in 1801. After after his death in 1808, Richard Nicholas Marsh of Westleigh Hall, in 1813.

Legh died on 12 August 1804 and was buried at Knutsford.

Parliament of Great Britain
Preceded by Joseph Tolson Lockyer; William Wilson	Member of Parliament for Ilchester; 1765–1774; With: William Wilson (1765–1768); Sir Brownlow Cust, Bt (1768–1774)	Succeeded by Peregrine Cust; William Innes
