= Ellis Wynn =

Sixteenth century English member of Parliament

Ellis Wynn (before 1559 – 27 September 1623) was an English politician.

He was appointed Gentleman harbinger by 1596 and a Clerk of the Petty Bag in Chancery in 1603.

He was a member (MP) of the parliament of England for Saltash in 1597.
