= William Innes (merchant) =

British merchant and politician

William Innes (1719–1795) was a British merchant and politician who sat in the House of Commons from 1774 to 1775.

Innes was born on 29 July 1719, the son of Alexander Innes of Cathlaw, West Lothian, and his wife, Johanna Ainslie, daughter of Alexander Ainslie, a merchant of Edinburgh. His father was a banker and merchant of Edinburgh and in 1749 Innes was a merchant in London, trading with the West Indies. He married Ann Wintle on 19 May 1753.

At the 1774 Innes was elected in a contest as Member of Parliament for Ilchester on the interest of Thomas Lockyer. He is not recorded as voting in Parliament, but he made two speeches in his time on army estimates and the land tax. Ilchester had a history of corrupt practices and the defeated candidates petitioned against the result on grounds of bribery. The election was declared void a year after on 4 December 1775. Innes did not stand again. He died on 14 January 1795. Innes is the author of 'The Slave Trade Indispensable' 1790

Innes is listed in the UCL Legacies of British Slave-ownership database as the creditor of several slave-owners.

Innes funded a memorial in the Church of St Mary the Virgin in Lewisham for his nephew Joseph Innes, who died in Jamaica in 1779. He also left money in his will for a memorial to be placed there in his own honour.

Parliament of Great Britain
Preceded by Peter Legh; Sir Brownlow Cust, Bt.	Member of Parliament for Ilchester; 1774–1775; With: Peregrine Cust	Succeeded by Nathaniel Webb; Owen Salusbury Brereton
