= Edward Phelips (Royalist) =

English landowner and politician (1613–1680)

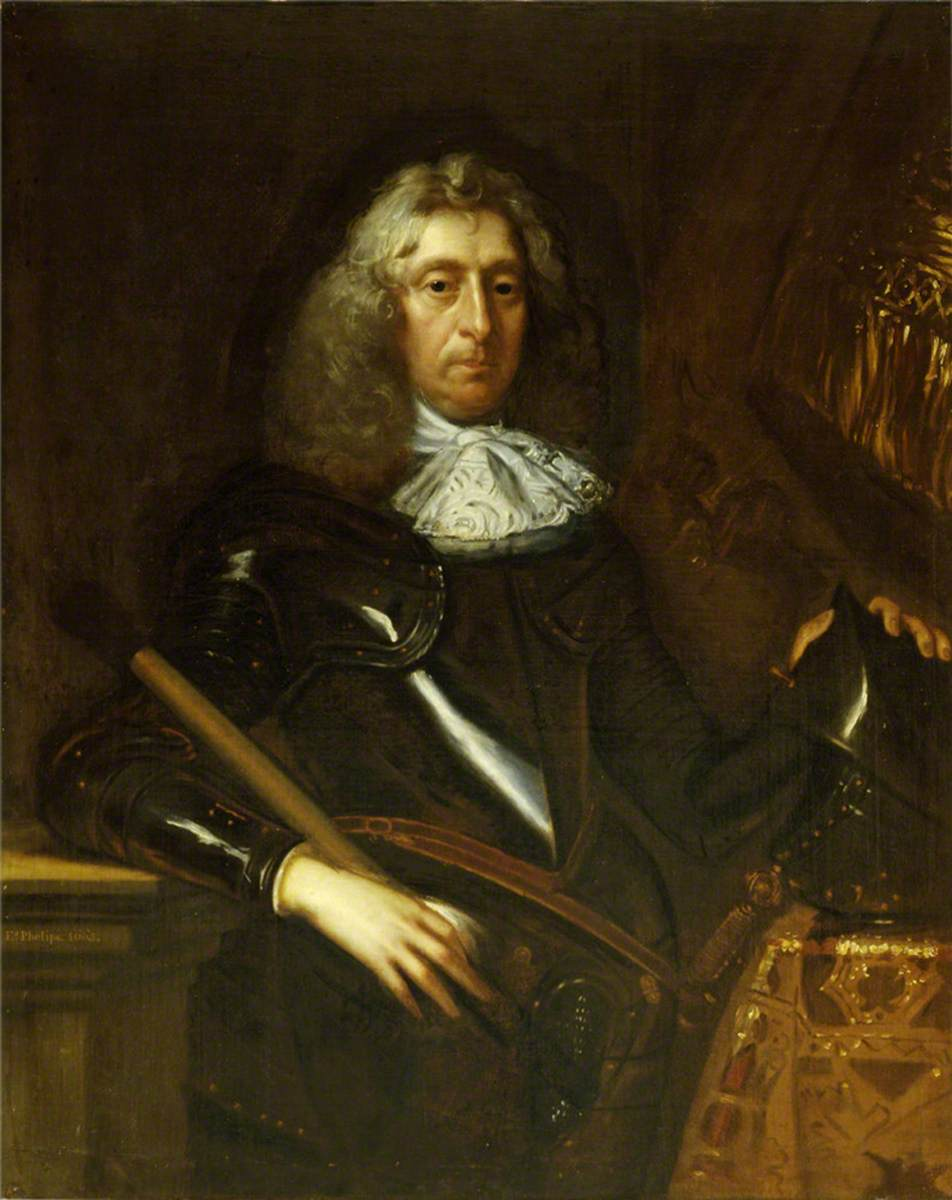
Colonel Edward Phelips by Jacob Huysmans

Edward Phelips (c. 1613 – 5 February 1680) was an English landowner and politician who sat in the House of Commons at various times between 1640 and 1679. He fought for the Royalist cause in the English Civil War.

== Biography ==
Phelips was the son of Sir Robert Phelips of Montacute and his wife Bridget Gorges, daughter of Sir Thomas Gorges of Longford Castle, Wiltshire. He matriculated at Wadham College, Oxford on 30 October 1629, aged 16.

In 1640, Phelips was elected Member of Parliament for Ilchester in the Short Parliament. He was re-elected MP for Ilchester for the Long Parliament after a void election in 1640. He was a commissioner of array for the King in 1642 and became a colonel of horse in the Roylist army in 1643. He was governor of Ilchester from 1643 to 1645 and was disabled from sitting in parliament on 5 February 1644. In 1647, he compounded for £1,276. He was accused of taking part in the Penruddock uprising in 1655 and was tried at Chard but was acquitted by the grand jury.

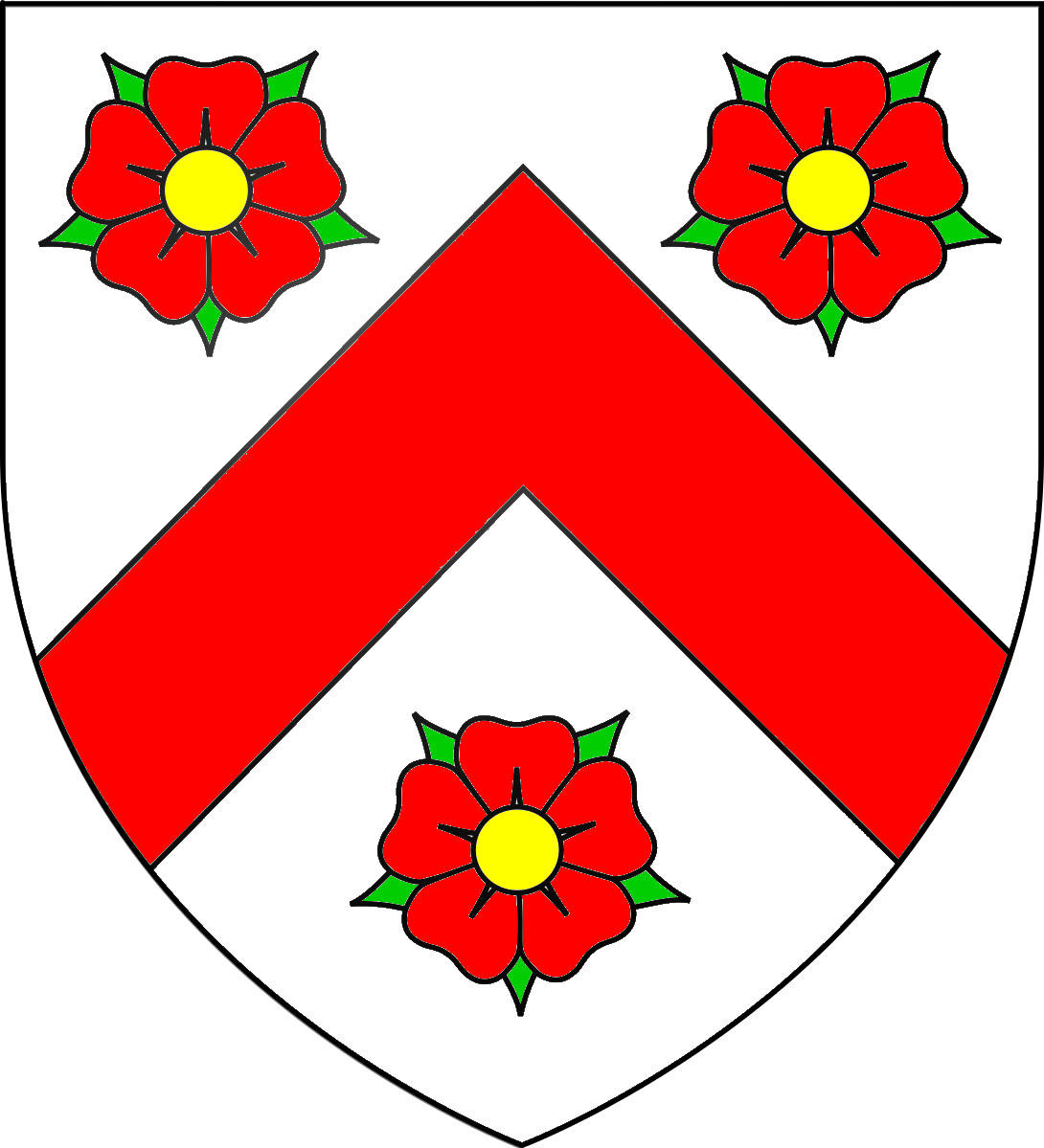
Arms of Phelips: Argent, a chevron gules between three roses of the second seeded or barbed vert

He was involved to some extent in Charles II's escape from England after the Battle of Worcester, at the point when his brother Robert was trying to arrange passage for Charles aboard a vessel from Southampton. He traveled to Trent Manor to convey news of Robert's activities to Charles on or about 28 September 1651. He may have been with Robert during some of Robert's efforts in and around Southampton.

At the Restoration Phelips was one of those proposed as a Knight of the Royal Oak, having an income of £1,500 p.a. He was appointed to the Western circuit and became Deputy Lieutenant of Somerset in July 1660, and became commissioner for sewers and commissioner for assessment in August 1660. In 1661, he was elected Member of Parliament for Somerset in the Cavalier Parliament. He became high steward of Ilchester in the same year and commissioner for corporations in Somerset in 1663. He was defeated at Somerset and lost out in a double return at Ilchester in the general election in 1679. He died on 5 February 1680 at the age of 67 and was buried at Montacute.

== Family ==
Phelips married Anne Pye, daughter of Sir Robert Pye of Faringdon, Berkshire on 21 February 1632. He had four sons of whom Edward was also MP for Ilchester and two daughters. His brother Robert was also an MP.

Parliament of England
Vacant Parliament suspended since 1629	Member of Parliament for Ilchester; 1640; With: Henry Berkeley	Succeeded by Henry Berkeley; Robert Hunt
Preceded by Henry Berkeley; Robert Hunt	Member of Parliament for Ilchester; 1640–1644; With: Robert Hunt	Succeeded by William Strode; Thomas Hodges
Preceded by Hugh Smith	Member of Parliament for Somerset; 1661–1679; With: Sir John Stawell (1661–1662); John Poulett (1662–1665); Sir John Warre (1665–1669); Sir John Sydenham (1669–1679)	Succeeded by Sir Hugh Smith
