= Barrington Court =

Tudor manor house in Barrington, Somerset, England

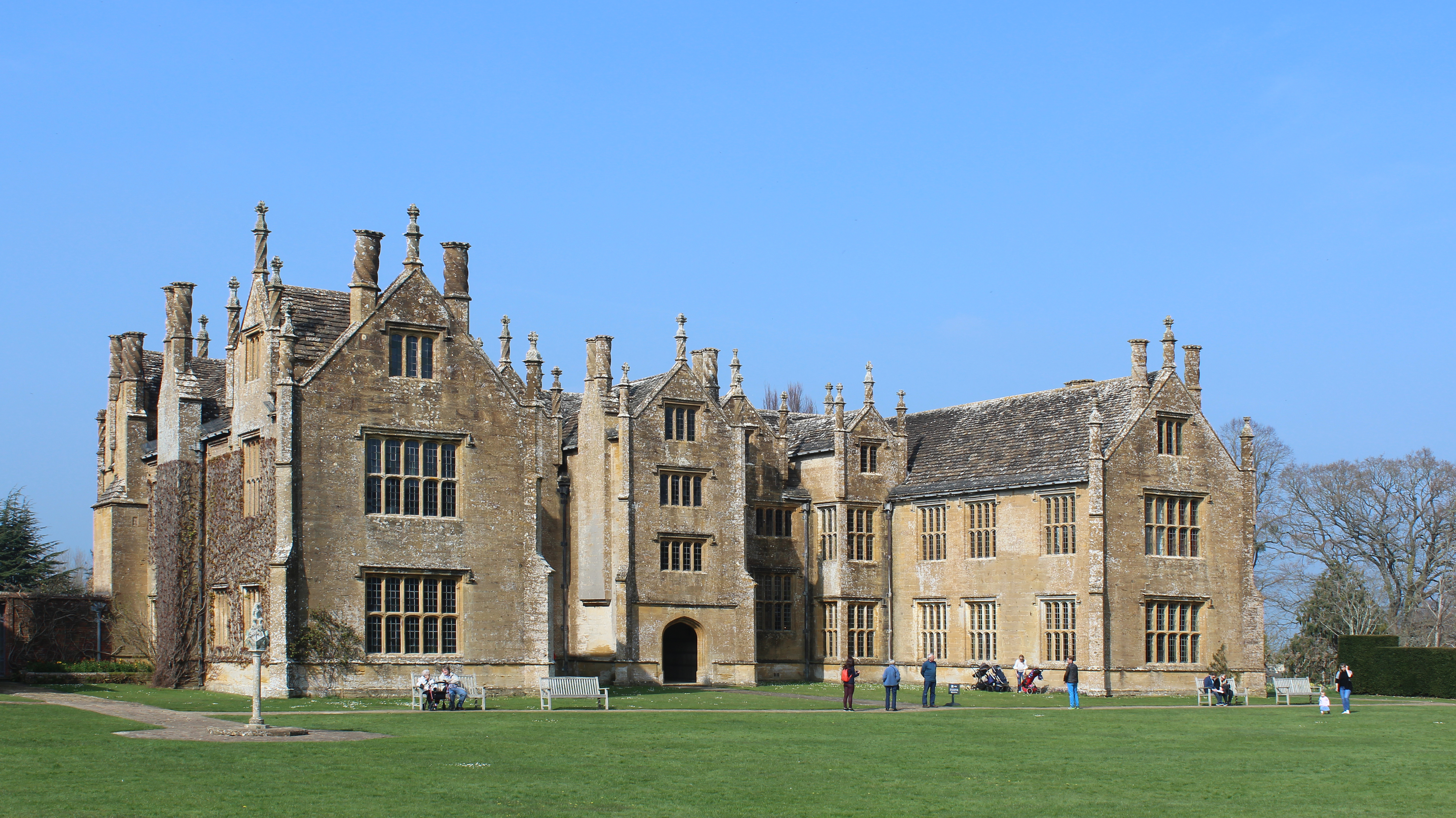

- Location within Somerset
- 50°57′40″N 2°51′31″W
- Location: Barrington, Somerset, England

History
- Built: 1550s

Site notes
- Architectural style: Tudor
- Owner: National Trust

Listed Building – Grade I
- Official name: Barrington Court
- Designated: 17 April 1959
- Reference no.: 1345920

Listed Building – Grade II*
- Official name: Wing to Barrington Court
- Designated: 17 April 1959
- Reference no.: 1056932

National Register of Historic Parks and Gardens
- Official name: Barrington Court
- Type: Grade II*
- Designated: 20 September 1988
- Reference no.: 1000505

Listed Building – Grade II
- Official name: Gateway to west of forecourt area
- Designated: 20 September 1988
- Reference no.: 1056934

Listed Building – Grade II
- Official name: Motor House
- Designated: 20 September 1988
- Reference no.: 1264739

Barrington Court is a Tudor manor house begun around 1538 and completed in the late 1550s, with a vernacular stable court (1675), situated in Barrington, near Ilminster, Somerset, England.

The house was owned by several families by 1745 after which it fell into disrepair and was used as a tenant farm. After repair by architect Alfred Hoare Powell (1865–1960), it was acquired by the National Trust in 1907, on the recommendation of the antiquarian Canon Hardwicke Rawnsley (1851–1920). It has been described as the first house acquired by the National Trust, although Alfriston Clergy House, a more modest property, was acquired earlier. In the 1920s the house was renovated after Colonel Lyle and his wife 'Ronnie' agreed to take on a ninety-nine year repairing lease from the Trust, and work began in 1921. The stable block turned into a residence and several outbuildings, gardens and gateways were constructed.

The house was originally surrounded by a medieval deer park and in the 17th century a formal garden was constructed. This had largely disappeared until a new garden was laid out by garden designer Gertrude Jekyll (1843–1932) in an Arts and Crafts-style. It now contains walled kitchen gardens, fruit orchards and ornamental gardens.

== History ==
The estate had been occupied since the 11th century and by the 14th century included a substantial house to the north east of the present building, where traces of a moat can still be seen. In 1446 the owner, Giles Daubeney, 6th Baron Daubeney, died at Barrington and left it to his son, another Giles Daubeney, Giles Daubeney, 1st Baron Daubeney who was a courtier, diplomat and military commander under Edward IV and Henry VII.

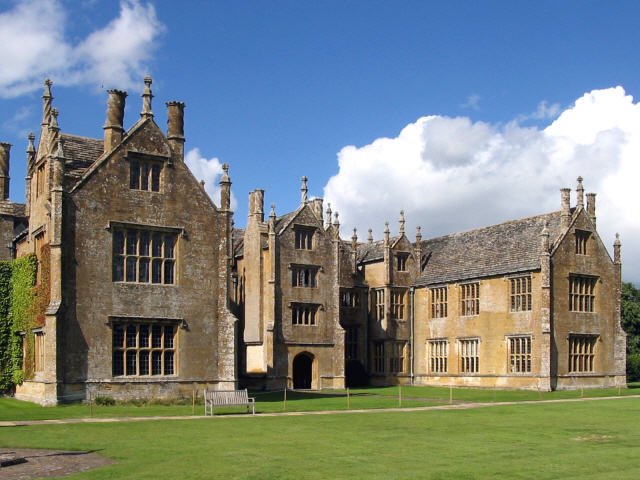
The south front

The manor was inherited in 1514 by Henry Daubeney, created Earl of Bridgewater for his services to Henry VIII. He spent much of his time in France and little time in Somerset. He may have begun the new house, but he went bankrupt. He married a Catherine Howard. It is unlikely that much, if any, of the current building was his work. The house was forfeit to the crown and then had various owners including Henry Grey, 1st Duke of Suffolk, who in 1552 sold it to William Clifton, a London merchant who had been assembling a Somerset estate. Clifton or his son John Clifton are thought to be responsible for most of the building at Barrington, possibly modeled on earlier work at Kirby Hall or East Anglian manors close to their roots at Kentwell Hall, Hengrave Hall or Channonz Hall at Tibenham.

It passed down in the Clifton family including Gervase Clifton, who in 1605 sold it to his brother-in-law Sir Thomas Phelips of Montacute House. The house was then mortgaged and, in 1625, sold to Colonel William Strode, Jr. The house and estate were owned by the Strode family from 1625 until 1745 after which it was bought by several different owners but poorly maintained, becoming known as Court Farm.

The interior of the house suffered from its demotion to a tenant farm and from a fire in the early 19th century; after being almost derelict it was repaired under the supervision of Alfred Hoare Powell. Barrington Court was acquired by the National Trust in 1907 and was leased to Col. Abram Arthur Lyle of Tate & Lyle in the 1920s. Abram Lyle and his wife, Elsie Ronalds Lyle (née. Crowdy and known as 'Ronnie') turned the house around and refurbished the court house and renovated Strode House (built by Colonel Strode's son, William III, in 1674) which was originally a stable and coach block. It was at this time that the Lyles contracted Gertrude Jekyll to design the three formal gardens on the property that are maintained by the head gardener.

The house was one of the first large properties acquired by the National Trust; it was not anticipated just how expensive repairs and maintenance would be, and even thirty years later it was still used as an example of why the Trust should be wary of taking on other country houses.

Barrington Court was occupied by a tenant, Stuart Interiors, that took the lease in 1986 from Andrew Lyle, grandson of Col. Lyle. The company sold reproduction furniture. Stuart Interiors left Barrington Court in December 2008, and although the building has no furniture, it is open to visitors.

== Architecture ==
Like many Elizabethan mansions, Barrington is built in an 'E' shape with large projecting wings with square projections that contain staircases. The house is not truly symmetrical as the hall has two lights and the buttery one. The south front has seven gables supported by octagonal buttresses and decorated with twisted finials with ogee scale-work caps and English Crockets.

Its central entry porch leads into a screens passage with the hall on the left and, an innovation, a service passage leading to the kitchen wing that occupies the right wing. A long gallery stretches the entire length of the house on the upper floor.

=== Strode House ===
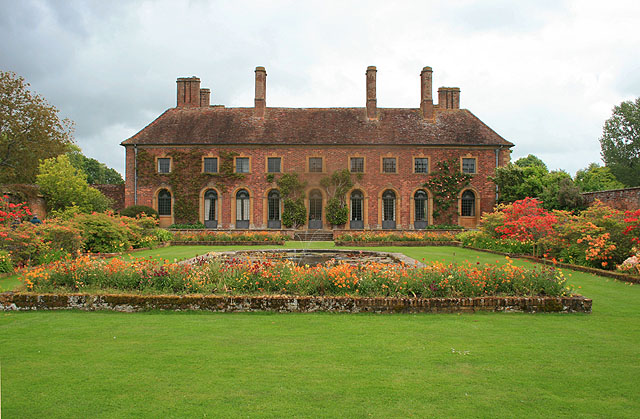
Strode House

The stables – built in 1674 by William Strode III – were converted into a separate house around 1920, under plans drawn up by the architect J.E. Forbes, when the building was given a new west front. The two-storey brick building has Hamstone dressings and a hipped tile roof. Immediately in front of the building is the "fountain court".

=== Outbuildings ===
In the 1920s a "motorhouse" was constructed in a Tudor style to match the other buildings. It is a single-storey building with an attic. The front of the building is decorate with heraldic lions.

The two-storey agent's house, known as Beechams, was also built in the 1920s. There are also row of six thatched cottages in Tudor style, a farmhouse and a barn dating from the same period.

=== Gateways and walls ===
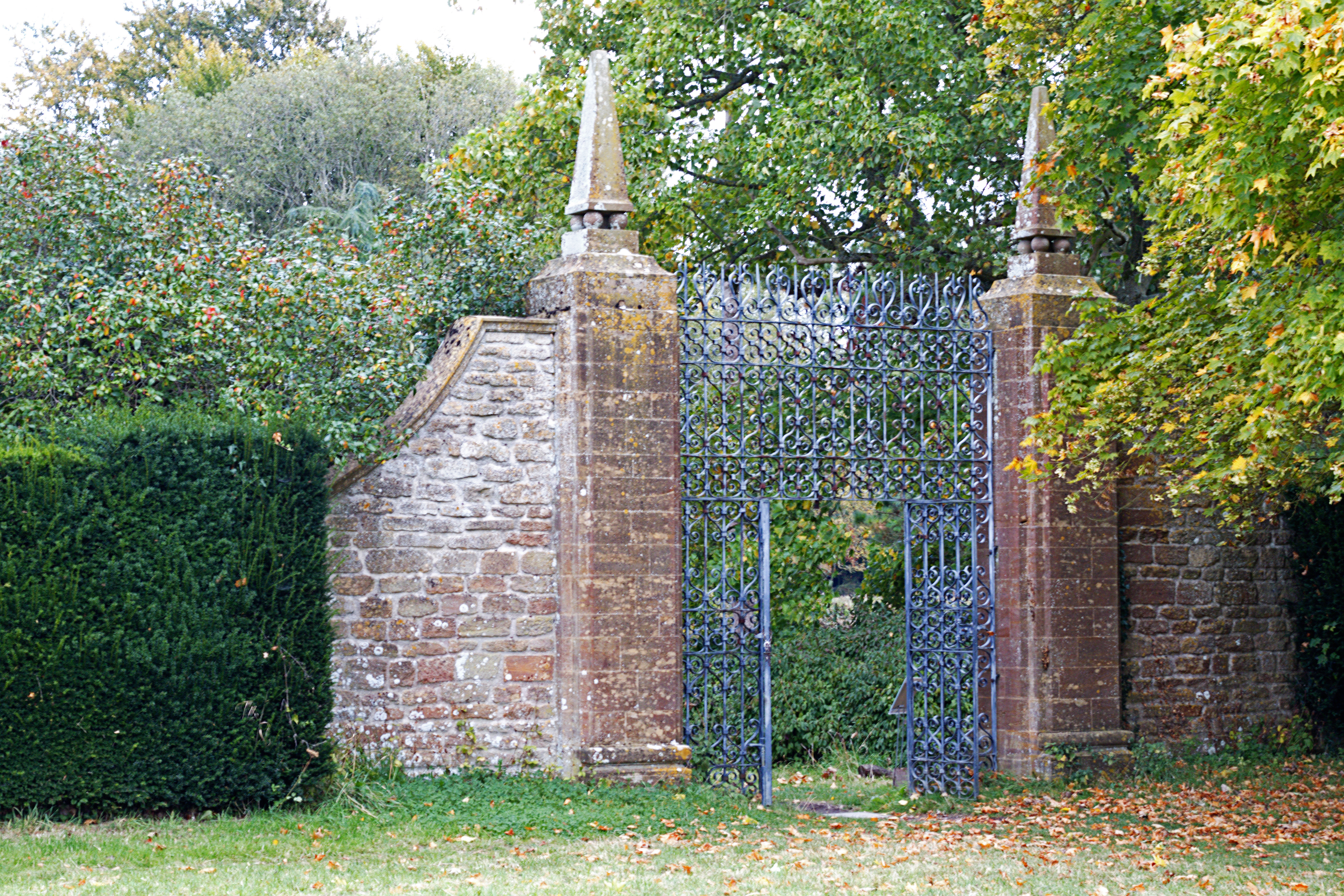
View of Gateway to East of South Lawn of Barrington Court

There are multiple gateways around the estate and entrances to the house. The gateway to the west of the forecourt was rebuilt in the 1920s with tall piers and moulded stepped caps, permitting a full view of the symmetrical facade of the house. The gateways to the east of the forecourt and to the east of the south lawn have wrought iron gates. The wall around the forecourt is of the same vintage and has rectangular lily ponds at the base.

== Gardens ==
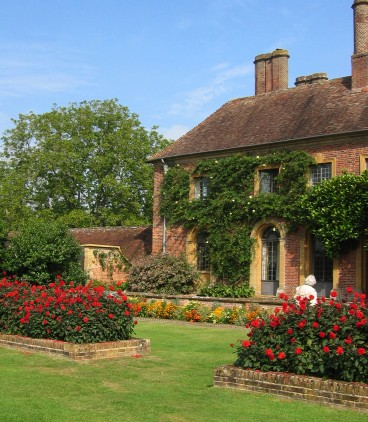
Part of house and gardens at Barrington Court in late summer

In the 16th century the house was surrounded by a deer park. In the 1550s William Clifton took action, in the Star Chamber court, against local poachers who hunted deer in the park while he was away.

The remains of the original gardens include a rectangular raised area or parterre 70 metres (230 ft) by 50 metres (160 ft) near a liner pond or canal which is 12 metres (39 ft) by 110 metres (360 ft). There is also geophysical evidence of a further 17th-century formal garden.

Barrington Court is noted for its Arts and Crafts-style gardens for which garden designer Gertrude Jekyll provided planting plans. The gardens were laid out in 1917 by J. E. Forbes, of the partnership Forbes & Tate, for Lieut-Col. A. Arthur Lyle. There are a series of walled areas that include a white garden, a rose and iris garden and a lily garden. The original plans are being used to restore the gardens; however, the planting scheme has been changed from that designed by Jekyll to that designed by Mrs Lyle in the 1960s.

The walls of the kitchen garden were built in the 1920s and include two gateways with neoclassical architraves. The gravel paths are laid out in a square with a cross at the centre enhanced by a fountain surrounded by fruit trees, vegetable plots and soft fruits. There are carriage openings with wrought-iron gates.

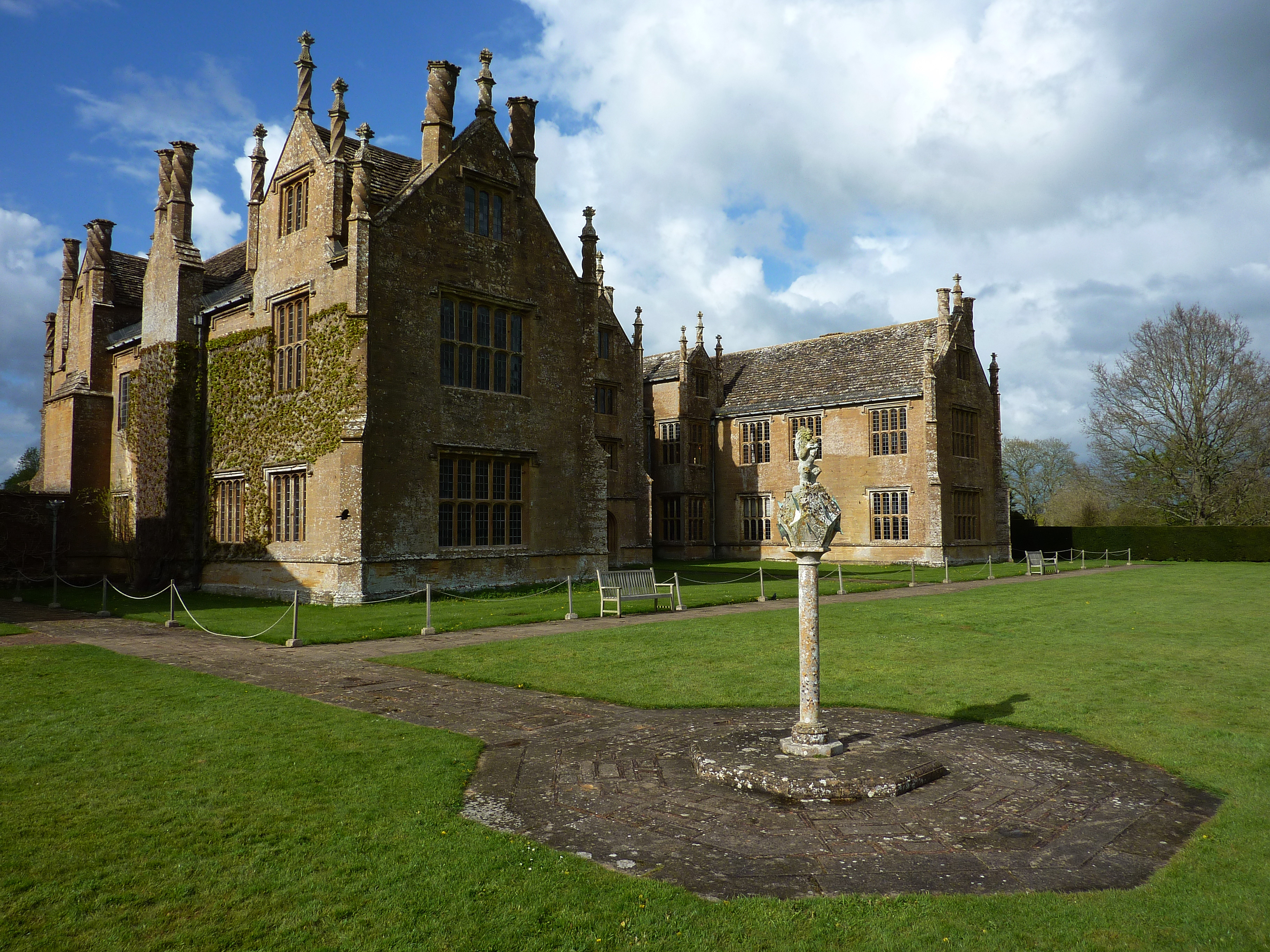
Unusual multi-faced sundial

The kitchen garden provides produce for the property's restaurant located in the adjacent Strode House; this includes many types of fruit and vegetables. The local St Mary & St Peter's CE VC Primary School, which has bases at Barrington and Ilton, has a vegetable plot where the children plant, tend and cook the produce; the walls are also strewn with apple, pear and plum trees. Attached to the garden is a squash court.

About 20 metres (66 ft) south west of the house is an unusual multi-faced sundial. It was built of stone and bronze, on a stone column. It is a dodecahedron surmounted by a heraldic lion. It was imported from California by Colonel Lyle in 1920.

The gardens are Grade II* listed on the National Register of Historic Parks and Gardens.

== Popular culture ==
Author Andrew Norman has argued that Barrington Court was the inspiration for 'Kellynch Hall' in Jane Austen's Persuasion.

In 2014 it was the site of filming for the BBC's Tudor-era historical TV serial Wolf Hall. In May 2015 the house was the venue for the BBC programme Antiques Roadshow.

== See also ==
- List of National Trust properties in Somerset
