= John Malet (died 1644) =

English politician

John Malet (c. 1573 – 10 April 1644) was an English politician who sat in the House of Commons.

Malet was the son of Sir John Malet of Enmore, Somerset. He matriculated at Balliol College, Oxford on 17 May 1588, aged 14 and was awarded BA on 28 January 1591. He succeeded his father in 1615.

In 1624, he was elected member of parliament for Bath in the Happy Parliament. He was appointed High Sheriff of Somerset for 1636.

In 1638 he obtained a Commission under the Great Seal, from King Charles I to improve the navigation on the River Tone. This granted him and his heirs sole navigation rights from Bridgwater to Ham Mills, and allowed him to improve the river at his own expense. He saw this as a philanthropic action, as it reduced the price of coal to the poor people of Taunton, as well as improving the transport infrastructure.

He died in 1644 and was buried in Bath Abbey. He had married Ann, the daughter of Sir John Tracy of Toddington, Gloucestershire, with whom he had one son and four daughters. He was succeeded by his son, John.

Parliament of England
Preceded by Sir Robert Phelips; Robert Pye	Member of Parliament for Bath; 1624; With: Robert Pye	Succeeded by Ralph Hopton; Edward Hungerford
