= Clerk of the Petty Bag =

Former British legal office

A Clerk of the Petty Bag was a clerk in the former Petty Bag office of the English Court of Chancery.

The Petty Bag office dealt with common-law issues in the Court of Chancery and dated from as early as the 14th century, declining in importance towards the end of the 17th century. Its responsibilities were various, including dealing with suits against solicitors or attorneys and officers of the court itself, issuing writs for Parliamentary elections and the elections of bishops, summonses to Parliament and the enrolling of solicitors of the court itself. It also concerned itself with patents for inventions. The name of the office stemmed from the practice of keeping records in small paper bags.

There were three Clerks of the Petty Bag (the senior, second and junior clerks) at any one time until the mid-19th century when the number was reduced to one. They were appointed by the Master of the Rolls until the early 17th century, after which the appointments were made by the Crown. The single remaining clerk was transferred to the Supreme Court of Judicature in 1875, and the post finally abolished in 1889.

== Notable clerks ==
- William Ravenscroft 1598–1628
- Edward Norreys by 1600–
- Ellis Wynn 1603
- Laurence Whitaker 1611–1614
- Thomas Coningsby II 1616
- Robert Caesar 1628–1636
- Lancelot Baugh Allen 1824
