= Robert Phelips =

English politician

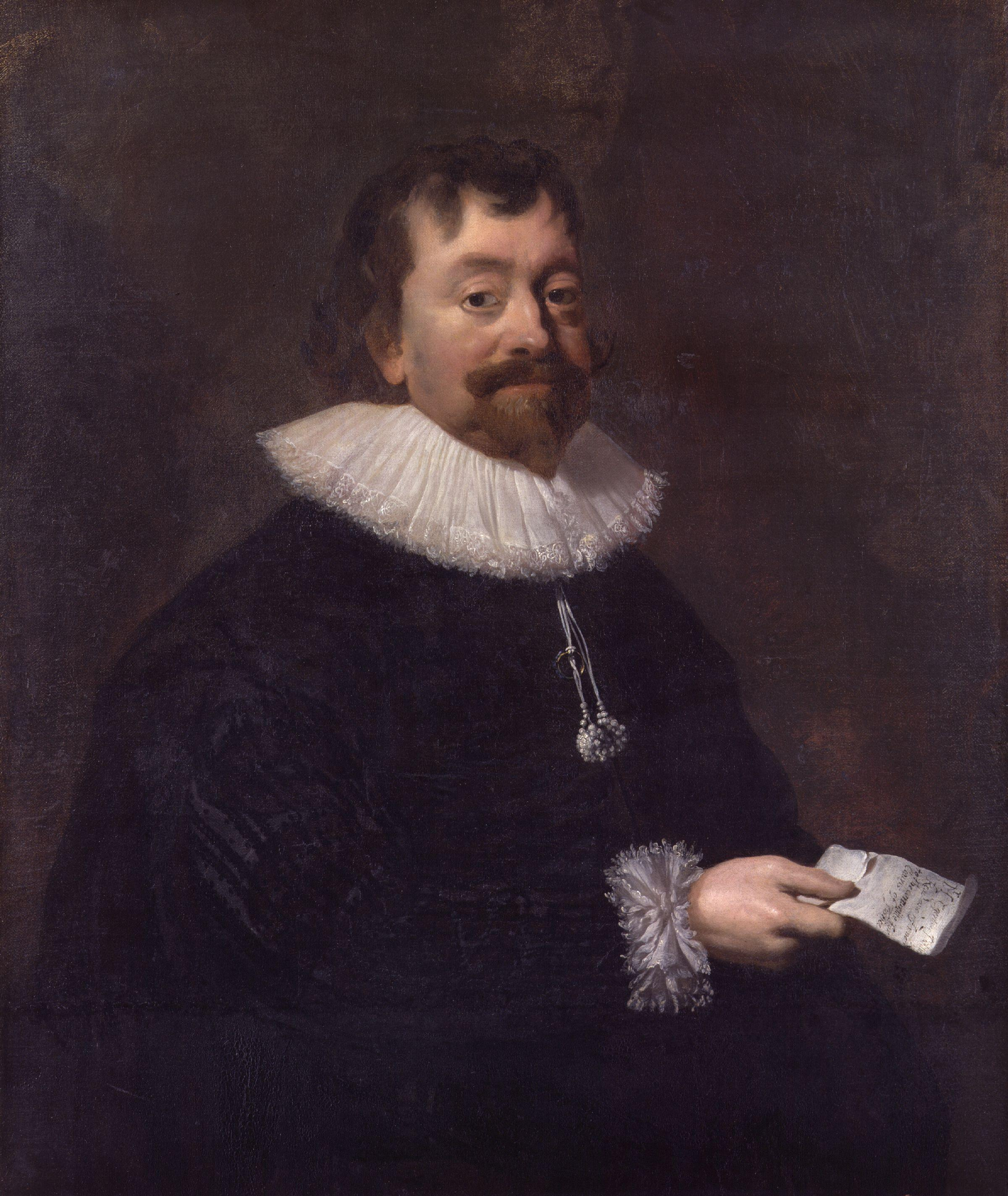
Sir Robert Phelips by Hendrik Gerritsz. Pot

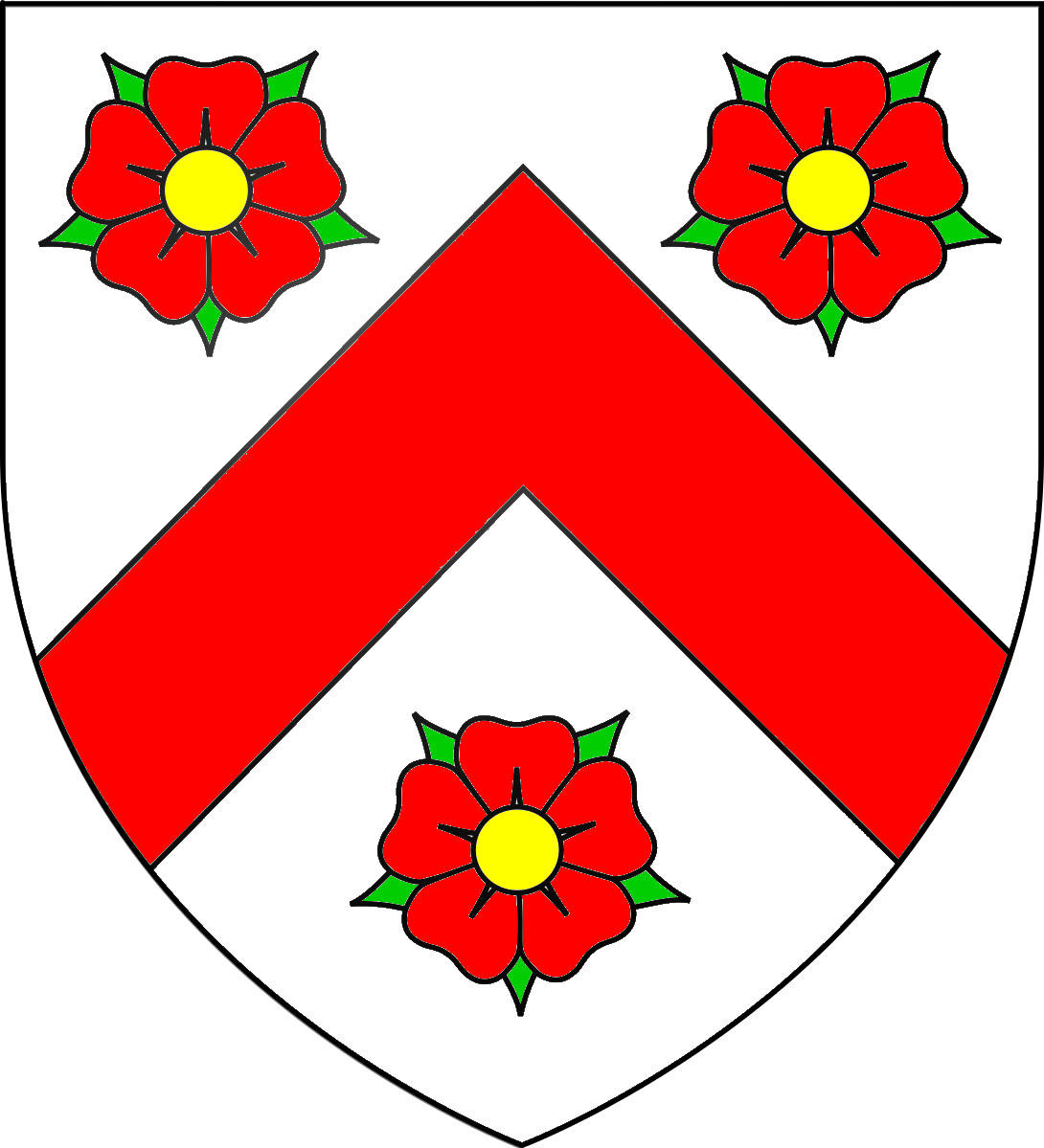
Arms of Phelips: Argent, a chevron gules between three roses of the second seeded or barbed vert

Sir Robert Phelips (c. 1586–1638) was an English politician who sat in the House of Commons at various times between 1604 and 1629. In his later Parliaments he was one of the leading spirits in the House of Commons and an opponent of James I, Charles I and their adviser Buckingham.

== Life ==
Phelips was the son of Sir Edward Phelips and his first wife Margaret Newdigate, daughter of Robert Newdigate of Newdigate, Surrey. His father was Speaker of the House of Commons and Master of the Rolls. Phelips was knighted in 1603. In 1604 he was elected Member of Parliament for East Looe. He was travelling in France in July 1613, and in the same year was granted the next vacancy in the clerkship of the petty bag. In April 1614 he was elected MP for Saltash. He made his mark by joining in the attack on Richard Neile, then Bishop of Lincoln, for his speech in the House of Lords reflecting on the commons. In 1615 he accompanied John Digby afterwards Earl of Bristol to Spain, where Digby was negotiating the Spanish match. Phelips kept a diary of his movements for a few days and wrote an essay on the negotiation.

In 1621 Phelips elected MP for Bath, and at once took a prominent part in its proceedings. On 5 February he accused the Catholics of rejoicing at Frederick's defeat in Bohemia, and meditating a second "gunpowder plot." On his motion of 3 March 1621, the house turned its attention to the patent for gold and silver thread. He served on the committee appointed to inquire into the matter, and brought up its report, which furnished the main charges against Sir Giles Mompesson. Also in March, he was chairman of the committee to inquire into the charges of bribery brought against Francis Bacon. (Note: A portrait by Hendrik Gerritsz Pot, preserved at Montacute House, represents Phelips holding a paper which formed the ground of the impeachment of Francis Bacon (National Portrait Gallery: Primary Collection NPG 3790).) On 17 March he presented the committee's report in a speech "of great force and moderation", and was ordered to lay the evidence before the House of Lords. In May he was one of the first to urge the house to punish Edward Floyd. In November he warmly attacked Spain, and proposed to withhold supplies and a few days later he supported the commons' petition against the Catholics and the Spanish marriage. On 1 January 1622 he was arrested for his share in these proceedings and was imprisoned in the Tower of London on 12 January. He remained there, in spite of his brother's petition, until 10 August 1622.

When the next Parliament was summoned, the King demanded that Phelips (and a number of others) should not be returned but, although he had influence with the boroughs James could not intimidate the county freeholders and Phelips was elected for Somerset. He again demanded war with Spain, but came into no open collision with the court. He was re-elected MP for Somerset in 1625, the first Parliament of the new reign. He was the outstanding leader of the anti-Court party. In the first days of the session he supported an abortive motion for immediate adjournment, in order to defer the granting of supplies. A few days later he carried a motion that two subsidies only should be granted. On 5 July he wished the house to discuss the question of impositions, and rebutted the king's claim to impose duties on merchandise at will. He also objected to the liberation of priests at the request of foreign ambassadors. In August, when parliament reassembled at Oxford, Phelips pursued his former policy. At Oxford he virtually assumed that unacknowledged leadership which was all that the traditions of Parliament at that time permitted. On 10 August, in a high strain of eloquence, he defined the position taken up by the commons, and laid down the lines on which the struggle was fought until the Long Parliament (Forster, Life of Eliot, i. 239–241). Next day parliament was dissolved. It was Phelips who placed the true issue of want of confidence before the House so that "As far as the history of such an assembly can be summed up in the name of any single man, the history of the Parliament of 1625 is summed up in the name of Phelips" (Gardiner).

For the 1626 Parliament, the Crown ensured that Phelips was named as High Sheriff of Somerset which debarred him from election. Although he was once again named as MP for Somerset and attempted to take his seat, in this case the law was clear and he was excluded. In the same year he was struck off the commission of the peace for Somerset, and refused to subscribe to the forced loan. He was elected MP for Somerset again in 1628. He was present at a meeting of the leaders at Sir Robert Cotton's house a few days before the session began, and again took an active part in the proceedings of the house. He protested against the sermons of Sibthorpe and Mainwaring, and was prominent in the debates on the petition of right, but the informal position of leader was taken by Sir John Eliot.

Subsequently, Phelips is said to have inclined more towards the court. In 1629 Charles wrote, urging him to look to the interest of the King rather than to the favour of the multitude. The King decided to rule without parliament from 1629. In 1633 Phelips sided with the court against the puritans on the question of suppressing wakes. In the same year he protested his devotion to the King, and was again put on the commission for the peace. However, in 1635 he took part in resisting the collection of ship-money.

Phelips died "of a cold, choked with phlegm" and was buried at Montacute on 13 April 1638.

== Character assessment ==
Phelips was an impetuous, "busy, active man, whose undoubted powers were not always under the control of prudence". According to Sir John Eliot, his oratory was ready and spirited, but was marred by "a redundancy and exuberance", and "an affected cadence and delivery"; he had "a voice of much sweetness", and spoke extempore.

== Family ==
Phelips married Bridget Gorges, daughter of Sir Thomas Gorges of Longford, Wiltshire. They had four daughters and three sons.

- Edward Phelips (the eldest son) succeeded him, became a colonel in the Royalist army, and had his estates sequestrated. He was later MP for Ilchester and Somerset.
- Robert Phelips (the second son, died 1707), also became a colonel in the royalist army, a courtier and a member of Parliament.

== Notes ==
Parliament of England
Preceded by John Hanham; Robert Yardley	Member of Parliament for East Looe; 1604–1611; With: Sir John Parker	Succeeded by George Chudleigh; Sir Reginald Mohun
Preceded by Sir Peter Manwood; Thomas Wyvill	Member of Parliament for Saltash; 1614; With: Ranulph Crewe	Succeeded by Sir Thomas Trevor; Sir Thomas Smith
Preceded by Sir James Ley; Nicholas Hyde	Member of Parliament for Bath; 1621–1622; With: Sir Robert Pye	Succeeded by Sir Robert Pye; John Malet
Preceded by Sir Maurice Berkeley; Robert Hopton	Member of Parliament for Somerset; 1624–1625; With: John Simms 1624; John Stawell	Succeeded by Sir Henry Berkeley; Sir John Horner
Preceded by Sir Henry Berkeley; Sir John Horner	Member of Parliament for Somerset; 1628–1629; With: Sir Edward Rodney	Parliament suspended until 1640
