= Edward Phillips (British Army officer) =

Major-General Sir Edward Phillips KBE CB DSO MC
- Born: 19 December 1889; Coventry, England
- Died: 14 May 1973 (aged 83); Godalming, Surrey, England
- Military career
- Allegiance: United Kingdom
- Branch: British Army
- Service years: 1914–1949
- Rank: Major-General
- Commands: CB General Hospital Poona; 4th Field Ambulance; British Military Hospital, Jhansi; 106th Field Ambulance
- Conflicts: First World War; Third Anglo-Afghan War; Second World War: North African Campaign; Tunisia Campaign; Sicily Campaign; Italian Campaign; Western Front; Operation Overlord; Invasion of Germany
- Awards: Knight Commander of the Order of the British Empire; Companion of the Order of the Bath; Distinguished Service Order; Military Cross; Commander of the Order of St John; Mentioned in Despatches (5); Legion of Honour (France); Croix de Guerre 1914–1918 (France); Croix de Guerre 1939–1945 (France); Order of Public Health (France); Legion of Merit (United States); Order of the Crown (Belgium)

Major-General Sir Edward Phillips, KBE, CB, DSO, MC (19 December 1889 – 14 May 1973) was a British military doctor, who served throughout the First World War, saw action in Afghanistan and on the North West Frontier, the Middle East and was then a leading medical officer in the British Army through the Second World War in Africa, Italy, D-Day, the liberation of Bergen-Belsen concentration camp and the establishment of the British Army of the Rhine. He had "arguably the most distinguished field service career of any Army doctor of this [the 20th] century".

== Early career ==
Phillips was born in Coventry, England, in December 1889, one of two sons. His father Edward Phillips, was a local doctor (and an enthusiast in 1902 of the benefits of cars for doctors.) He want to St Pauls School in London. As a young man Edward wanted to join the army but family pressure pushed him to medicine: he graduated in medicine from Durham University at Newcastle and at the London Hospital, LRCP, MRCS. He then joined the Royal Army Medical Corps in July 1914.

== Military career ==
=== First World War ===
Phillips joined the army in 1914 (as a Lieutenant from 31 July 1914), initially in reserve and then on Western Front in France as a medical officer from 19 December 1914. He was the Regimental Medical Officer of the Royal Irish Regiment 1914–1915. The role of the medical officer in wartime was to be the first step in the casualty treatment and evacuation with an aid post in the trenches supported by orderlies and stretcher bearers. Medical officers were both within areas under the fire and directly exposed to snipers if they treated wounded in the open.
He was promoted to captain on 30 March 1915, mentioned in despatches on 1 January 1916 then awarded the Military Cross on 14 November 1916. The citation read:

For conspicuous gallantry and devotion to duty. He collected wounded under heavy shell, rifle and machine-gun fire. He set a fine example by his complete disregard of danger.

In 1917 Phillips was serving with the 105th Field Ambulance (attached to the 35th Division). On 4 January 1918 he was promoted acting Major, and shortly thereafter on 17 August 1918, acting Lt-Colonel "while in charge of a medical unit". The unit in question was 106th Field Ambulance., which he commanded until 30 March 1919. The 106th Field Ambulance was also attached to the 35th Division, through to the German spring offensive and the final advance in Flanders. A field ambulance would provide relays of stretcher bearers and some first aid, within the area where they could be under fire. They were a mobile unit, and they sought to stabilise casualties to go back to a Casualty Clearing Station or Dressing Station. A full strength Field Ambulance comprised 10 officers and 224 men.
In March 1919 he reverted to his substantive rank of captain on being moved to a new post in India (see below).

Phillips was mentioned in despatches three times, on 1 January 1916, 25 May 1918 and 10 July 1919.

Phillips was awarded the French Croix de Guerre in 1919, in addition to the 1914–15 Star, British War Medal and Victory Medal. He was also awarded the Distinguished Service Order in the 1919 Birthday Honours as part of a group honoured for "For distinguished service in connection with military operations in France and Flanders".

=== Between the wars ===
Phillips served in India from 1919 to 1923, including on the North West Frontier during the time of the Third Afghan War. He received the Indian Army General Service Medal, with an Afghanistan North West Frontier 1919 clasp. He was a temporary major from 4 November 1919 to 30 March 1923. He received the General Service Medal but the record does not specify for which campaign.

The period 1923 to 1928 is unclear, although he was promoted to a substantive major on 31 July 1926. He was serving in India 1928–1935, although he returned to the UK in 1933 via Malta, and in 1934 – February 1935 he was Medical Officer for the Equitation School, Sangor (south east of New Delhi), India. An equitation school is a riding school, usually for cavalry troops.
From 17 November 1935 he took over as CO of 4 Field Ambulance in Egypt and Palestine on which appointment he was promoted Lt-Colonel.
He returned to India from 1936 to 1942, as Commanding Officer of British Military Hospital Jhansi (Uttar Pradesh, India). from 1936 to 1937, under ADMS for Meerut District and Delhi Independent Brigade Area, Eastern Command Col. S.G.S.Haughton.

=== Second World War ===
==== 1940–1942 ====
The start of the war found Phillips still as Commanding Officer, Combined British General Hospital (CBGH) Poona, India from 1940 to 1941 in a routine hospital management role, and in 1941 at Combined General Hospital (CGH)(Indian Army).

Phillips joined a directly active unit on 27 September 1941 when he was appointed Colonel (with seniority backdated to 17 November 1938) and Assistant Director Medical Services, 10th Indian Infantry Division around its formation. An assistant director was head of the medical services for a Division. The Division was commanded by Maj-Gen.Bill Slim and at that time it landed in Basra, captured Baghdad and the oilfields of Mosul as part of the Anglo-Iraqi War which was linked to World War II. The division then invaded Syria (in pursuit of Vichy French aeroplanes placed there by the Germans) until June, then invaded Iran as part of the Operation Countenance Anglo-Soviet invasion of Iran to secure the Iranian oilfields from the Axis powers for the Allies and Russians. The division then returned to a static guarding role in Mosul. Medical Services in the division were drawn from the RAMC and Indian Army Medical Corps and included the 14th, 21st & 30th Indian Field Ambulance.

In April 1942 he rejoined the British Army as Deputy Director Medical Services HQ for XIII Corps and XXX Corps. "Deputy Director" was the title given to Corps level commanders for the RAMC (and other service corps) in Corps-level formation, originally as a Colonel-level appointment and later Brigadier level. Phillips was an Acting Brigadier from 14 April 1942, then Temporary Brigadier from 14 October 1942. XIII Corps was commanded by Lt-Gen William Gott and was part of the British 8th Army in the North African desert, which had suffered serious reverses. General Claude Auchinleck was shortly to take over. This period of the North African Campaign included the retreat to Tobruk, the defeat at Gazala (at the same time as Phillips was briefly a Prisoner of War, see below), the Mersa Matruh defeat, and the First Battle of El Alamein, which halted the Axis advance and led to the arrival of General Montgomery who Phillips was to follow for the rest of the war, during Operation Torch, the 2nd Battle of El Alamein, then to Italy, France and Germany.

Phillips' involvement with these events can be seen in the later (16 February 1943) medal citation for his CBE (by which time he was a temporary brigadier) as part of a group of awards "in recognition of gallant and distinguished services in the Middle East during the period May, 1942 to October, 1942". His citation reads:

Brig. PHILLIPS has been DDMS 13 Corps since 8 Apl 42. This period included the battles around TOBRUK beginning 27 May, the subsequent withdrawal to the ALAMEIN line and the fighting in that position. Throughout that period the successful evacuation and treatment of casualties was largely due to the arrangements made and supervised by Brig. PHILLIPS. In this is displayed an exceptionally astute appreciation of the requirements of the varied and difficult situations arising, and his anticipation of events from the medical point of view ensured that wounded were evacuated expeditiously and with the minimum suffering. The energy displayed by Brig. PHILLIPS and his personal influence exercised through frequent visiting of all Corps Medical Units was a great inspiration and encouragement to his subordinates and the source of confidence to those working in close touch with him. He was once taken prisoner but later had success in escaping and carried on with his duties immediately.

On a more personal note, on 3 June 1942 Brigadier Phillips wrote to his mother from XIII Corps HQ, MEF, "...since my last letter I have been a Prisoner of War & escaped! I was very well treated & made my get-a-way in this middle of battle when my captors were otherwise engaged! I am very well & back at work, very busy as you can imagine from the news in the papers. It looks as if the tide has at last turned & you can understand how pleased I am. You know how I like all this excitement & am glad that I'm no longer where I was this time last year... your devoted son, Teddie."

==== 1943–1944: Invasion of Sicily, Italy, and D-Day ====
Phillips was appointed Deputy Director Medical Services XXX Corps, but quickly moved up in February 1943 to be Deputy Director Medical Services of Eighth Army, at the point when it came under the new 18th Army Group to allow co-ordination between British-led allied forces and the Americans. As DDMS, Eighth Army and by then a Brigadier (temporary), under Field Marshal Montgomery, he was involved in the planning and execution of Operation Husky, the invasion of Sicily in July 1943 which at that point was the largest amphibious assault ever mounted. He was Mentioned in Despatches on 13 August 1944 "in recognition of gallant and distinguished services in Sicily" for his work in this period. From July 1943 to 1944 he was Deputy Director Medical Services 3rd Advance Base.

In January 1944 General Montgomery returned to the UK to lead 21st Army Group, which had two armies: the British Second Army and 1st Canadian Army. Phillips was appointed Deputy Director Medical Services (DDMS) 2nd Army, and from 10 November 1944 that year made Acting Major General and Director Medical Services (DMS), 21st Army Group, replacing Major General Sir Percy Stanley Tomlinson on his retirement. The promotion was made substantive on 12 December 1944.

The purpose of 21st Army Group was the invasion of Europe, ultimately achieved in Operation Overlord (the invasion of France) in 1944. Phillips was in charge of planning the medical elements of the invasion, which was a huge undertaking and a complex logistical operation both in the planning and execution. The invasion was planned at St Pauls School in London, of which both Phillips and his commanding officer Monty were old boys.
Based on experience in the desert and the resulting 1942 Hartgill Committee report the medical services knew they had to redesign themselves. The report identified that ambulances were too cumbersome, communications poor, transport too slow and surgeons too far back. There was a recommended new structure which was to lead to a re-organisation of existing units e.g. field ambulances and created new units e.g. Field Surgical Units, Field Dressing Stations to speed response times and a focus on 200-bed (rather than 600 or 1,200 bed) General Hospitals. However, this was never entirely managed in the active desert force and the first use of the full new scheme was in Phillips' 21st Army Group structure.

"[A]s D.M.S. 21 Army Group, [Phillips] controlled a service considered by many to have been without parallel". and the scale of the medical task for D-Day (as the largest amphibian operation in history) meant that the medical arrangements were of unprecedented complexity. The medical units deployed on D-Day (26 June 1944) and the immediate aftermath, and the casualty clearing chain all the way back over the Channel to the UK were unprecedentedly challenging and large.

==== Medical Services for Overlord ====
The estimates for casualties for British and Canadian forces were based on official War Office casualty rates known as the Evetts Rates, but the intensity of fighting expected led to the application of a new "Double Intense" rate being applied. The estimates included an assumption that of casualties, there would be (on D-Day and D+1) a 30/70 split, then on D+2 a 25/75 split. For D-Day the plan was for evacuation of all casualties that could be moved, and the provision of life saving surgery by the medical units in the beach organisation.

Field Ambulances landed with each brigade and battalion (so-called "Beach Groups") including two Field Dressing Stations, two Field Surgical Units and a Field Transfusion Unit (with 2 days of blood) supplemented by surgical teams, and these teams were working and operating by H+90 (i.e. 90 minutes after the first attack on), together with the usual Field Ambulance and other personnel and extra supplies of bloods and other items. Beach Groups could offer first-aid, life-saving surgery and retain casualties unfit for further short-term evacuation. They would then evacuate casualties from the beach to ships. This scheme was backed up with a comprehensive plan for the reception and distribution of casualties to hospitals within the UK. Evacuation to UK was by initially off-shore by ambulance Amphibious 'Duck' Vehicles out to hospital ships, or LSTs modified to carry stretcher cases or LSTs with medical crews for walking wounded.

By D+2 (28 June) it was possible to concentrate the Casualty Clearing Stations and the hospitals which began to arrive at the beach-head into three principal medical areas (at Hermanville, Reviers and Ryes – Hermanville had to close on D+6 as the space was needed for an ammunition depot so was moved to La Deliverande and later another site was started at Beyeux). The Field Dressing Stations within the corps were situated near the casualty clearing stations and attended to the lightly wounded, exhaustion cases and sick, leaving the Casualty Clearing Stations clear to handle major casualties. The hospitals in the rear medical areas received casualties from the corps Casualty Clearing Station. By D+3 Blood Transfusion depots were set up and operating, with blood dispatched to France by naval dispatch launch and later (D+16) by air.

Casualty Evacuation Posts were set up on each British beach and consolidated at Courseulles with two Field Dressing Stations, two Field Surgical Units and one Field Transfusion Unit and accommodation for 1,500 casualties. Air transport (evacuations out and supplies in) began on D+7 and by D+14 was firmed up with RAF liaison and medical teams, a dedicated landing strip and designated hospital (81 General Hospital).

By 26 July there were 12 Casualty Clearing Stations, 19 General Hospitals (all tented, at this stage, with either 200, 600, 800 or 1,200 beds each) and 3 Medical Depots. By 26 September there were 17 more General Hospitals and 2 more depots. As the breakout occurred the casualty evacuation chain got longer, managed mainly by two RAMC and one US American Field Service Ambulance group. This group had previously operated in Italy, where Phillips said jokingly, when welcoming them in Italy that "he had grown so used to [them] that he almost considered [them] British!". Eventually road transport routes were too long, and a railhead was established and daily hospital trains set up. Most of the hospitals were mobile, leapfrogging each other to move forward, establish, receive casualties, and then clear casualties, closing, moving forward. The medical depots could not keep up so mobile teams were instituted. As the advance consolidated, larger convalescent depots were set up in civilian hospitals, religious buildings or schools to hold all troops who might return to service in under 30 (later under 42) days. Treatment of mental problems – shellshock (percussive damage from being exposed to too much gunfire), battle exhaustion, and mental breakdown were a new area of medicine for the army – Phillips at one point referred to psychiatary as "witchcraft" but went over to France to ensure that mental health was being managed.

==== 1944 – VE Day: Advance to Germany and maintaining Civil Public Health ====
As the advance continued through Belgium and the Netherlands evacuation chains were constantly changing - by the time of the Rhine crossing there were 11 British and 1 Belgian Ambulance trains direct from near the front to the medical facilities with most casualties being evacuated from Ostend by hospital ship or by air from brussels or Bruges.
German military hospitals were overrun in the advance, and were full of casualties. Captured Enemy Medical Equipment sections had been set up and these and with British doctors took over management of these hospitals using the German staff to treat the German wounded. The German and other civilian health services also came under this control – one doctor recalled that "My job [in August 1945] (with one superior officer, Lieutenant-Colonel Hugh Sixsmith) was to run the whole of the captured German military medical service in the British Zone: hundreds of German military hospitals, with about half a million patients, thousands of German medical officers, nurses, and other staff, motor vehicles galore, about 20 hospital trains, and four hospital ships. Among the patients were thousands of sick and wounded prisoners of war, and we had to organise them into trainloads and repatriate them to Italy, Yugoslavia, or whatever was their country of origin..." Having become concerned about how ambulance trains were moving so slowly "...I put in a report to my chief, the director of medical services Major-General Sir Edward Phillips, and he intervened at top level to get a higher priority for these ambulance trains." Phillips and the other seniors officers had been junior officers at the time of the 1918 Flu epidemic and were aware of the risk of a public health collapse following war.

Prisoners of War liberated from captivity also had to be processed and returned, and while Displaced Persons were in theory the responsibility of the Military Government the military medical services in practice provided hospital facilities, supervised hygiene and sanitation of Displaced Persons camps.

In April 1945 Brigadier Hughes, DDMS 2nd Army, with 11th Armoured Division entered Bergen-Belsen concentration camp to find more than 60,000 emaciated prisoners, more than 13,000 corpses in various stages of decomposition, and a great risk of disease, which Phillips was ultimately responsible for dealing with.

Phillips was mentioned in dispatches for the fifth time on 9 February 1945.

== Peacetime and retirement ==
Various awards for his wartime service followed: In 1945 he was appointed as a Companion of the Bath as part of a group of awards for the actions in North West Europe. On 24 January 1946 he was knighted, appointed KBE. The USA appointed him to the Legion of Merit (Officer), in August 1946, the Belgians to Commander of the Order of the Crown in 1946 and the French gave him one of comparatively rare Officer of the Order of Public Health medals. He also wore a WW2 Croix de Guerre (France) on his uniform but it is unclear when it was awarded.

Over 24/25 August 1945 Phillips transitioned from DMS 21st Army Group to Director of Medical Services, British Army of Occupation, which became British Army of the Rhine and stationed at the HQ in Bad Oeynhausen. "The medical branch occupied a large convent. Major-General Sir Edward Phillips, (at one time Monty's chief sawbones) was in charge. There were two brigadiers, three full colonels, a lieutenant-colonel and several majors. Apart from a couple of quartermasters, they were all consultants."

The role of DMS BOAR included helping re-establish German civilian medicine, and introducing German doctors to Penecillin, which was still very new with even the military doctors still unsure as to its best method of use and a 21 Army Group manual refers in the foreword to his interest in the topic.

He married a much younger doctor, (Captain) Margaret Dunn in her home town of Plymouth, Devon. Margaret had been a civilian doctor in Glasgow but had been called up to the Royal Army Medical Corps and come over to France and later Germany with the military hospitals commanded by Phillips as part of Operation Overlord and subsequent advances.

In January 1949 he was confirmed in his rank of Major-General as a supernumerary after 4 years in that role, but retired on 24 May 1949. On 19 December 1954 he was removed from the reserve list

In retirement he became the Honorary Librarian of The Heraldry Society, and was made an Honorary Fellow.

He bought a house in Godalming, Surrey with his wife. They had a daughter and remained there until his death. Phillips died at home of cancer in 1973 having been treated at Cambridge Military Hospital in Aldershot; he was survived by his wife and daughter.

== Obituary ==
His obituary in the British Medical Journal described him thus:

There was nothing indefinite about Eddie Phillips. He was never afraid to take decisions, knew exactly what he wanted, and usually got it. At whatever level he was he worked tirelessly for the good of the field medical services, and finally, as D.M.S. 21 Army Group, controlled a service considered by many to have been without parallel. He would not tolerate inefficiency and appeared to some to be ruthless in dealing with it. This, indeed, he may sometimes have been, but in his dealings with his friends, and these included the whole of his staff with its large numbers of distinguished civilian consultants, he was extraordinarily kind and considerate, going to great lengths, often surreptitiously, to help them. He was ideal to work with, defining his policies and leaving his staff to get on with implementing them and never interfering in detail. He backed them to the hilt with others, whatever he occasionally had to say to them in private, and his vocabulary was full and could be pungent. Eddie Phillips was both a first-class doctor and a first-class soldier, who had the gift of inspiring loyalty in his staff and of returning it. Difficult to get to know, he then became a most charming friend and amusing companion. He had arguably the most distinguished field service career of any Army doctor this century and his name and achievements will live in R.A.M.C. annals.

The Heraldry Society produced a Funerary hatchment and their obituary noted that "Edward was so modest that unless one had recourse to reference books one would never have suspected what a distinguished person he was. To members of the Society he was a good friend and a devoted Honorary Librarian."

== Portraits ==
There are photographic portraits of Sir Edward held by the National Portrait Gallery, and a painting and other photographs at the Imperial War Museum
