= Robert Caesar =

English politician (1602–1637)

Robert Caesar (9 October 1602 – 27 October 1637) was an English lawyer and politician who sat in the House of Commons in 1625 and 1626.

Caesar was the son of Sir Julius Caesar, privy councillor of James I and Charles I. He attended Eton from 1609 to 1615. He matriculated at Queen's College, Oxford on 26 January 1616, aged 13 and was awarded BA on 15 October 1618. He was called to the bar at Inner Temple in 1622.

In 1625, he was elected Member of Parliament for Bodmin. He was elected MP for Ilchester in 1626. From 1628 to 1636 he was a Clerk of the Petty Bag and from 1636 to 1637 one of the Six Clerks in the Court of Chancery .

On 7 December 1630 in Rolls Chapel he married Elizabeth, daughter of John Manning, a merchant of London.

Caesar died at the age of 35.

Parliament of England
Preceded by Sir Thomas Stafford; Charles Berkeley	Member of Parliament for Bodmin; 1625; With: Henry Jermyn	Succeeded by Henry Jermyn; Sir Richard Weston
Preceded by Richard Wynn; Sir Robert Gage	Member of Parliament for Ilchester; 1626; With: Sir William Beecher	Succeeded by Sir Robert Gorges; Sir Henry Berkeley
