= George Speke (politician, died 1689) =

English politician

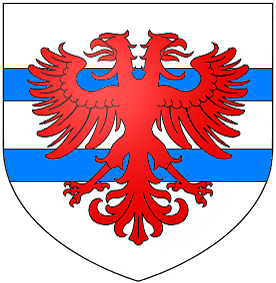
Speke arms: Argent, two bars azure over all an eagle with two heads displayed gules

George Speke (1623–1689) was an English politician. A Royalist during the English Civil War, after the Restoration of Charles II he became an early Whig supporter in Parliament.

== Life ==
Speke was from Whitelackington, near Ilminster in Somerset; his parents were George Speke, and Joan, daughter of Sir John Portman. He became a ward of Sir Robert Pye, and later married his daughter.

Speke gave financial support to Prince Rupert at Bridgwater; and when the town surrendered to Thomas Fairfax in July 1645 he was taken as a hostage and his goods sequestrated. Before the end of 1645 he was transferred from the Tower of London to the Gatehouse Prison. He pleaded compulsion as his motive for joining the king's party, and poverty as a reason for the reduction of his fine. He eventually compounded for £2,390, and was released on payment of the sum in May 1646.

He lived quietly, serving in 1661–1662 as High Sheriff of Somerset until, in August 1679, he was elected M.P. for Somerset. At the same time his third son John was returned for Ilchester. Parting company with old allies (the Courtenays, the Seymours, and the Portmans) he now threw himself into the politics of the country party, joined the Green Ribbon Club, and voted for the Exclusion Bill of 1680. He extended a brilliant reception to the Duke of Monmouth at Whitelackington, during his progress in November 1681. He was alleged to have said that he would assist the cause of Monmouth in military fashion, should the need arise. After the Rye House Plot, Whitelackington was searched for arms, without result.

A heavy fine was imposed on Speke for having, it was alleged, created a riot in rescuing his son-in-law John Trenchard from the custody of a messenger in June 1685. In May 1689 he petitioned in vain for the remission of the fine; Robert Cotton opposed him.

Speke died soon after the Glorious Revolution.

== Family ==
He married Mary, daughter of Sir Robert Pye; she was a nonconformist and politically active. His switch from Royalist to Whig political views has been attributed to her. Their youngest daughter Philip [sic] married John Trenchard. There were nine children of the marriage, of whom five became political followers of their parents; they included Hugh Speke. The fourth son, Charles, was executed after Monmouth's Rebellion; the rest of the family were pardoned after a payment of £5,000.

From George Speke's younger brother, William, was descended the explorer John Hanning Speke
