= Henry Berkeley (MP for Ilchester) =

English politician (1579–1667)

Sir Henry Berkeley (1579–1667) was an English politician who sat in the House of Commons variously between 1626 and 1640. He supported the Royalist side in the English Civil War

Berkeley was the son of Sir Henry Berkeley of Bruton and his wife Margaret Lygon, daughter of William Lygon of Madresfield, Worcestershire. He matriculated at Queen's College, Oxford aged 11 on 13 February 1590 together with his brother Maurice. In 1601 he inherited the manor of Yarlington on the death of his father. He was knighted at Whitehall on 29 April 1609.

In 1626 Berkeley was elected Member of Parliament for Somerset. In 1628 he was elected MP for Ilchester and sat until 1629 when King Charles decided to rule without parliament for eleven years. In April 1640, Berkeley was elected MP for Ilchester in the Short Parliament. Berkeley was a Commissioner of Array for the King during the Civil War, and was included in the surrender of Exeter on 13 April 1646.

Berkeley died between 1666 and 1667.

Berkeley married Elizabeth Nevill, daughter of Sir Henry Nevill of Billingbear House, Berkshire and his wife Ann Killigrew, daughter of Sir Henry Killigrew. His daughter Dorothy married Francis Godolphin and brought him the Yarlington estate.

Parliament of England
Preceded by Sir Robert Phelips; John Stawell	Member of Parliament for Somerset; 1626; With: Sir John Horner	Succeeded by Sir Robert Phelips; Sir Edward Rodney
Preceded by Sir William Beecher; Robert Caesar	Member of Parliament for Ilchester; 1628–1629; With: Sir Robert Gorges	Parliament suspended until 1640
Vacant Parliament suspended since 1629	Member of Parliament for Ilchester; 1640; With: Edward Phelips	Succeeded by Edward Phelips; Robert Hunt
