= Hugh Speke =

Hugh Speke (1656 – c. 1724) was an English writer and agitator.

== Life ==
He was a son of George and Mary Speke of Whitelackington, Somerset. His father was a member of the Green Ribbon Club, the Whig organization founded in 1675, and was a supporter of the Duke of Monmouth, voting for the Exclusion Bill in 1681.

Educated at St John's College, Oxford, Hugh Speke joined the Green Ribbon Club, and in 1683 he was put in prison for asserting that Arthur Capell, Earl of Essex, another of Monmouth's supporters, had been murdered by the friends of James, Duke of York. He was tried and sentenced to pay a fine, but he refused to find the money, and remained in prison for three years, being in captivity during Monmouth's rebellion, in consequence of which his brother Charles was hanged at Ilminster. In prison Speke kept a printing-press, and from this he issued the Address to all the English Protestants in the Present Army, a manifesto written by the Whig divine Samuel Johnson, urging the soldiers to mutiny.

In 1687 he was released, and in 1688 he served James II as a spy in the camp of William of Orange. In December of this year a document, apparently official, was found by a London bookseller. This called upon the Protestants to disarm their Roman Catholic neighbours; it was freely circulated, and much damage was done to property in London before it was found that it was a forgery. It appears to have been the work of Speke, although this was not known until 1709, when he asserted his authorship in his Memoirs of the Most Remarkable Passages and Transactions of the Revolution. He afterwards issued these memoirs with modifications as The Secret History of the Happy Revolution in 1688 (1715).

After imploring both Anne and George I to reward his past services, Speke died in obscurity before 1725.
