= Thomas Crisp (MP) =

British politician

Thomas Crisp (c. 1690–1758), of Parbold, near Wigan, Lancashire, was a British politician who sat in the House of Commons from 1727 to 1734.

Crisp was the eldest son of William Crisp of Parbold and his wife Isabella. In 1704, he succeeded his father. He was admitted at Middle Temple in 1709.

Crisp was recommended to be High Sheriff of Lancashire in 1715 as ‘a person of known affection to his Majesty and his government’. The Jacobite rebellion occurred during his term of office, and in 1716 and 1717 he petitioned the Treasury for compensation for loss of the sheriff's profits as a result. He was awarded £1,284 in repayment, together with an extra £475 for his extraordinary care, pains and diligence in discharging his office of sheriff. At the 1722 British general election he was considered as a candidate for Wigan, but withdrew before the election. He was returned as a Whig Member of Parliament for Ilchester at the 1727 British general election. He voted with the Administration on the civil list arrears in 1729, on the Hessians in 1730 and on the army in 1732. He then voted with the Opposition on the Excise Bill in 1733 and the repeal of the Septennial Act in 1734. He was defeated at Ilchester at the 1734 British general election and did not stand again.

Crisp married Mary in about 1738. He was the probable builder of Parbold Hall. He died on 3 April 1758, aged 68, leaving a son and daughter, Mary, who married Sir John Tyrrell 5th Baronet.

Parliament of Great Britain
Preceded by Thomas Paget; Daniel Moore	Member of Parliament for Ilchester; 1727–1734; With: Charles Lockyer	Succeeded by Charles Lockyer; Sir Robert Brown
