= John Barker (MP for Ilchester) =

John Barker was an English merchant and politician who sat in the House of Commons in 1659.

Barker was a city of London merchant and a member of the Worshipful Company of Grocers. On 13 September 1651 he was elected alderman for the City of London for Bread Street ward.

In 1659, Barker was elected Member of Parliament for Ilchester in the Third Protectorate Parliament.

Barker married a daughter of Thomas Westrow who was alderman and sheriff of London in 1625.

Parliament of England
Preceded by Not represented in Second Protectorate Parliament	Member of Parliament for Ilchester; 1659; With: Richard Jones	Succeeded by Not represented in restored Rump
