= Robert Hunt (Parliamentarian) =

Robert Hunt (c. 1609 – 20 February 1680) was an English lawyer and politician who sat in the House of Commons at various times between 1641 and 1660. He supported the Parliamentary cause in the English Civil War, although he was mistakenly disabled from parliament as a Royalist.

Hunt was the eldest son of John Hunt of Forston, Charminster, Dorset and Compton Pauncefoot, Somerset and his wife Catharine Pepham, daughter. of Alexander Popham of Huntworth, North Petherton, Somerset. He was educated at Rampisham, Dorset under Mr Allott and was admitted at Caius College, Cambridge on 5 October 1625, aged 16. He entered Middle Temple in 1625 and was called to the bar in 1633. He was a J.P. for Somerset by the early 1640s.

In November 1640, Hunt was elected Member of Parliament for Ilchester, but his election was declared void. However he was re-elected in February 1641. He was disabled from sitting in 1644 when the local sequestrator claimed that he had attended the King's Parliament. However he was able to prove that he had given £100 to support the parliamentary cause. He was cleared delinquency but did not resume his seat. He was JP for Somerset from 1654 to 1659, a commissioner for scandalous ministers in 1654, a commissioner for security in 1655, and a commissioner for assessment in 1657. As High Sheriff of Somerset for 1654–55 during the Interregnum he was in charge of the trial of the Royalists after the Penruddock uprising which he conducted with reliability and impartiality. In 1659 he was elected MP for Somerset in the Third Protectorate Parliament. He was JP for Somerset from March 1660 until his death and a commissioner for militia in March 1660.

In April 1660 Hunt was elected MP for Ilchester in the Convention Parliament. He was commissioner for sewers in August 1660. He was commissioner for assessment from 1661 until his death and Deputy Lieutenant from 1666. He was considered "the most reputed justice in Somerset" and personally uncovered "a hellish knot of witches" in spite of official discouragement. He was a commissioner for recusants 1675. In the first general election of 1679 he stood for parliament together with Edward Phelips, but there was a double return and they never took their seats.

Hunt died at the age of 70 and was buried at Compton Pauncefoot.

Hunt married Elizabeth Browne, daughter of John Browne of Frampton, Dorset on 24 September 1635. They had three sons and five daughters. His wife died on 24 September 1675.

Parliament of England
Preceded by Edward Phelips; Sir Henry Berkeley	Member of Parliament for Ilchester; 1641–1644; With: Edward Phelips	Succeeded by Colonel William Strode; Thomas Hodges
Preceded by John Buckland; General John Desborough; John Harrington; John Ashe; Robert Long; Alexander Popham; Colonel John Gorges; Francis Luttrell; Sir Lislebone Long; William Wyndham; Francis Rolle	Member of Parliament for Somerset; 1659; With: John Buckland	Succeeded by Not represented in Restored Rump
