= Auditor of the Receipt of the Exchequer =

Abolished office in the English Exchequer

The Auditor of the Receipt of the Exchequer was an office in the English Exchequer.

The office originated in early times as the clerk of the Lord High Treasurer at the Receipt of the Exchequer. He was responsible for filing and entering the Teller's Bills from the Tellers of the Exchequer, certifying monies received to the Lord Treasurer, and auditing the books of the Tellers. The title of Auditor was officially attached to the post, combined with that of Tally Writer, during the reign of Elizabeth I. In 1826, the duties of the Chamberlains of the Exchequer devolved upon the Auditor. The office was abolished on the 10th of October 1834 (along with several other offices of the ancient Exchequer), whereupon its duties were subsumed into the new office of Comptroller General of the Exchequer.

== Auditors of the Exchequer ==
=== Early ===
- Richard Chesterfield c. 1356
- Robert Derby c. 1363–1367
- Thomas Orgrave 1367–1369
- John Innocent 1369–1385
- John Nottingham 1385–1390
- Robert Cotum 1390–1393
- John Candlesby 1393–1399
- Henry Somer 1399–1404
- John Burgh 1405–1410
- William Darell c. 1411–1415
- John Iwardeby 1415 – c. 1459
- William Hextall ? – 1460
- John Poutrell 1 October 1460 – c. 1461
- John Iwardeby 4 May 1462 – 1463
- John Poutrell 1463–1464
- John Leynton 20 October 1464 – 1465
- John Croke c. 1467–1469
- John Marshall 1469–1471
- Thomas Bulkeley 19 October 1471
- John Lewes 10 December 1490
- Robert Watno 3 May 1514
- Thomas Danyell 16 July 1517
- John Golding 1520
- Thomas Felton 10 May 1550
- Humphrey Shelton 8 October 1566
- Robert Petre 30 January 1569
- Thomas Hanbury 1572
- Vincent Skinner 11 November 1593 – 1603 (knighted 7 May 1603)
- John Bingley 2 August 1604 (knighted 10 January 1618, forfeit 25 January 1620)
- Sir Robert Pye 25 January 1620 (knighted 25 June 1620, deprived of office January 1642)
- Sir William Roberts 31 August 1654 (lost office 24 June 1660), initially jointly
- Sir Thomas Fauconberg 31 August 1654 (died 25 September 1655), jointly

=== 1660-1834 ===
- Sir Robert Pye 25 June 1660 (restored)
- Sir Robert Long, 1st Baronet 21 May 1662
- Sir Robert Howard 14 July 1673
- Christopher Montagu 5 April 1698
- Charles Montagu, 1st Earl of Halifax 17 November 1699
- George Montagu, 1st Earl of Halifax 30 September 1714
- Robert Walpole, 2nd Earl of Orford 9 May 1739
- Henry Pelham-Clinton, 2nd Duke of Newcastle-under-Lyne 1 April 1751
- William Grenville, 1st Baron Grenville 27 February 1794
- George Eden, 1st Baron Auckland 14 January 1834

To 10 October 1834.
