= Eddie Phillips (Australian footballer) =

Australian rules footballer

Personal information
- Full name: Eddie Phillips
- Born: 9 April 1931
- Original team: Sunshine
- Height: 169 cm (5 ft 7 in)
- Weight: 75 kg (165 lb)

Playing career^{1}
Years	Club	Games (Goals)
1952	Footscray	7 (8)
- ^{1} Playing statistics correct to the end of 1952.

Eddie Phillips (born 9 April 1931) is a former Australian rules footballer who played with Footscray in the Victorian Football League (VFL).
