= Thomas Paget (British Army officer) =

British Army officer and politician

Brigadier-General Thomas Paget
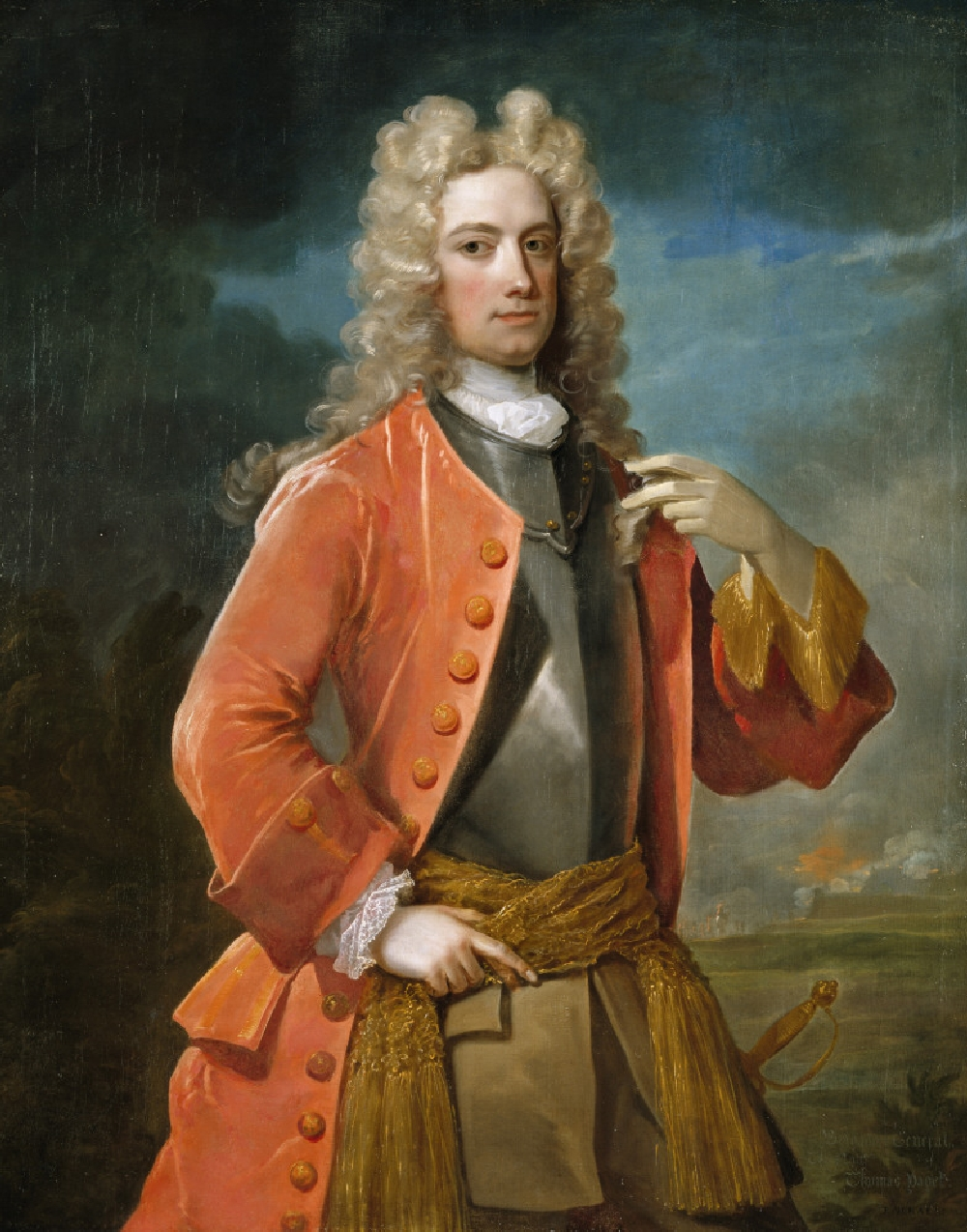
- Portrait by Charles Jervas
- Died: 28 May 1741 Minorca

Brigadier-General Thomas Paget (died 28 May 1741) was a British Army officer and politician who sat in the House of Commons from 1722 to 1727. He was the ancestor of the Paget family, Marquesses of Anglesey.

== Biography ==
Paget was the only surviving son of the Hon. Henry Paget by his second wife Mary, daughter of Colonel Hugh O'Rorke, sometime High Sheriff of Leitrim. Henry Paget was a younger son of William Paget, 5th Baron Paget and brother of William Paget, 6th Baron Paget, and had settled in Ireland.

Paget entered the Army during the reign of King William III, and was many years an officer of the 8th Horse (later 7th Dragoon Guards), with which corps he served under the Duke of Marlborough. On 1 August 1710 he was promoted to the lieutenant-colonelcy of the 8th Horse. He was made captain of a company in the 1st Foot Guards (ranking as a lieutenant-colonel of Foot) on 5 March 1711, and lieutenant-colonel of the 1st Troop of Horse Grenadier Guards on 10 March 1715. Paget stood unsuccessfully as Member of Parliament for Ilchester in the general election of 1722, but was returned on 11 December on petition. He did not stand in 1727 but instead took the post (until his death) of Groom of the Bedchamber to King George II.

On 28 July 1732 Paget was nominated colonel of the 32nd Regiment of Foot, from which he was removed on 13 December 1738 to the 22nd Regiment of Foot. In 1739 he was promoted to the rank of brigadier-general, and in 1741 was appointed Deputy-Governor of Minorca, dying there the same year.

By his wife Mary, daughter of Peter Whitcombe of Great Braxted, Paget was the father of Caroline Paget (died 7 February 1766). She married Sir Nicholas Bayly, 2nd Baronet and their son Henry succeeded as 9th Baron Paget following the death of the last member of the Paget family in 1769. He adopted the surname of Paget and is the ancestor of the current Paget family.

Parliament of Great Britain
Preceded by William Burroughs; Daniel Moore	Member of Parliament for Ilchester; 1722 – 1727; With: Daniel Moore	Succeeded by Charles Lockyer; Thomas Crisp
Military offices
Preceded by Charles Dubourgay	Colonel of the 32nd Regiment of Foot; 1732–1738	Succeeded by Simon Descury
Preceded by John Moyle	Colonel of the 22nd Regiment of Foot; 1738–1741	Succeeded by Richard O'Farrell
