= Robert Pye (Royalist) =

English courtier, administrator and politician

Sir Robert Pye (1585–1662) was an English courtier, administrator and politician who sat in the House of Commons between 1621 and 1629. He supported the Royalist cause in the English Civil War.

== Biography ==
Pye was the son of Roger Pye of The Mynde at Much Dewchurch in Herefordshire. He became Auditor of the Receipt of the Exchequer under King James I in 1620. In 1621 he was elected Member of Parliament for Bath and was re-elected for Bath in 1624. In 1625 he was elected MP for Ludgershall and in 1626 he was elected MP for Westminster. He was elected MP for Grampound in 1628. He purchased the manor and estate of Faringdon, which at that time was in Berkshire, from the Unton family.

Pye was a supporter of the King, and on this account was deprived of his office in 1642. During the Civil War he garrisoned his mansion at Faringdon for the Royalists, and it was stoutly besieged by his own son, Robert, who espoused the Parliamentary cause.

Following the Restoration, Pye was restored to his post as Auditor of the Receipt of the Exchequer, and held it until his death in 1662 at the age of 77.

== Family ==
Pye married Mary, daughter of John Croker of Batsford in Gloucestershire they had several children:

- Robert (c. 1620–1701), his heir; supported Parliament in the Civil War
- John (1626–1697), who lived at Hone, in Derbyshire, and became a baronet with the creation of the Baronetcy Pye of Leckhampstead on 27 April 1641
- Mary (fl. 1641–1697), became a nonconformist patron and political activist, and married George Speke (1623–1689)
- Anne, married Edward Phelips

Pye's brother Walter Pye was also an MP.

== Notes ==
Parliament of England
Preceded by Sir James Ley; Nicholas Hyde	Member of Parliament for Bath; 1621–1624; With: Sir Robert Phelips 1621–1622; John Malet 1624	Succeeded by Ralph Hopton; Edward Hungerford
Preceded by Edward Kyrton; William Sotwell	Member of Parliament for Ludgershall; 1625; With: Sir Thomas Jaye	Succeeded by Sir William Walter; Sir Thomas Jaye
Preceded by Sir Edward Villiers; William Mann	Member of Parliament for Westminster; 1626; With: Peter Heywood	Succeeded by Joseph Bradshaw; Thomas Morris
Preceded by Edward Thomas; Sir Thomas St Aubyn	Member of Parliament for Grampound; 1628–1629; With: Lord Carey	Parliament suspended until 1640
Political offices
Preceded by John Bingley	Auditor of the Exchequer; 1620–1642	Vacant
Preceded by Sir William Roberts	Auditor of the Exchequer; 1660–1662	Succeeded by Sir Robert Long, 1st Baronet
