= Ordre de la Santé publique =

French ministerial order, awarded from 1938 to 1963

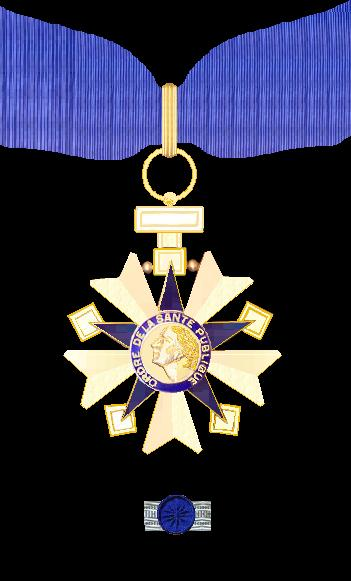
- Ordre de la Santé publique (Commander)
- Type: Ministerial order
- Awarded for: Service to public assistance, public health, and child protection.
- Country: France
- Presented by: Minister of Labour, Employment and Health
- Status: No longer awarded
- Established: 18 February 1938
- Commander ribbon bar Officer ribbon bar Knight ribbon bar

The Order of Public Health (French: Ordre de la Santé publique) was a French order of merit, created by presidential decree of President Albert Lebrun on 18 February 1938 and amended on 22 May 1954, and awarded for services to the public health and protection of children. It was replaced by the Ordre national du Mérite in 1963.

== Classes ==
The Order had three classes, and was only awarded to people who was minimum 30 years old.

- Commander (40 awards)
- Officer (170 awards)
- Knight (806 awards)

== Literature ==
- André Souyris-Rolland: Guide des Ordres Civil Français et Étrangers, des Médailles d'Honneur et des Médailles des Sociétés, Paris 1979
