= Edward Phillips (cricketer, born 1883) =

Welsh cricketer

Personal information
- Full name: Edward Stone Phillips
- Born: 18 January 1883; Newport, Monmouthshire, Wales
- Died: 8 May 1915 (aged 32); Ypres, West Flanders, Belgium
- Batting: Right-handed

Domestic team information
- Years: Team
- 1901–1914: Monmouthshire
- 1903–1904: Cambridge University

Career statistics
Competition	First-class
Matches	10
Runs scored	422
Batting average	23.44
100s/50s	1/1
Top score	107
Catches/stumpings	3/–
- Source: Cricinfo, 21 December 2018

Edward Stone Phillips (18 January 1883 – 8 May 1915) was a Welsh first-class cricketer.

Born at Newport, Phillips was educated at Marlborough College, where he played for the school cricket team for three years. From Marlborough he went up to Pembroke College, Cambridge. He began playing minor counties cricket for Monmouthshire in 1901, and when he went up to Pembroke he debuted in first-class cricket for Cambridge University against HDG Leveson-Gower's XI at Fenner's in 1903. Phillips would play a further nine first-class matches for Cambridge in the 1904 season. He was fairly successful for Cambridge in his capacity as a batsman, scoring 422 runs at an average of 23.44. He made one century score of 107 against GJV Weigall's XI.

After graduating from Pembroke he became a director in the family brewing business, Phillips & Sons, Ltd. Balancing his commitments to the family business and playing cricket, Phillips still regularly played minor counties cricket for Monmouthshire. He had a prolific season in 1905, scoring three centuries and was selected to play for South Wales in a non-first-class fixture against the touring Australians at Cardiff Arms Park. He played further minor matches for South Wales in the coming seasons against touring sides, including the West Indians in 1906, the South Africans in 1907, and the Gentlemen of Philadelphia in 1908. He played his last minor counties fixture for Monmouthshire in August 1914, by which point he had played 103 matches in the Minor Counties Championship.

With the onset of World War I, Phillips was commissioned into the Monmouthshire Regiment as a second lieutenant in August 1914. He was promoted to the rank of lieutenant in October 1914. In early May 1915, his battalion was engaged in the Battle of Frezenberg (as part of the wider Second Battle of Ypres), during which Phillips was killed in action during a German artillery barrage. He was subsequently buried where he fell, but his grave was destroyed by shellfire. His brother, Leslie, would be killed nearby less than three weeks later.
