= William Wilson (1720–1796) =

British politician, MP from 1761 to 1768

William Wilson (ca. 1720 – 12 December 1796) was a politician in Great Britain, and Member of Parliament (MP) for Ilchester in Somerset from 1761 to 1768.
