= Edward Phelips Jr. =

English landowner and politician (1638–1699)

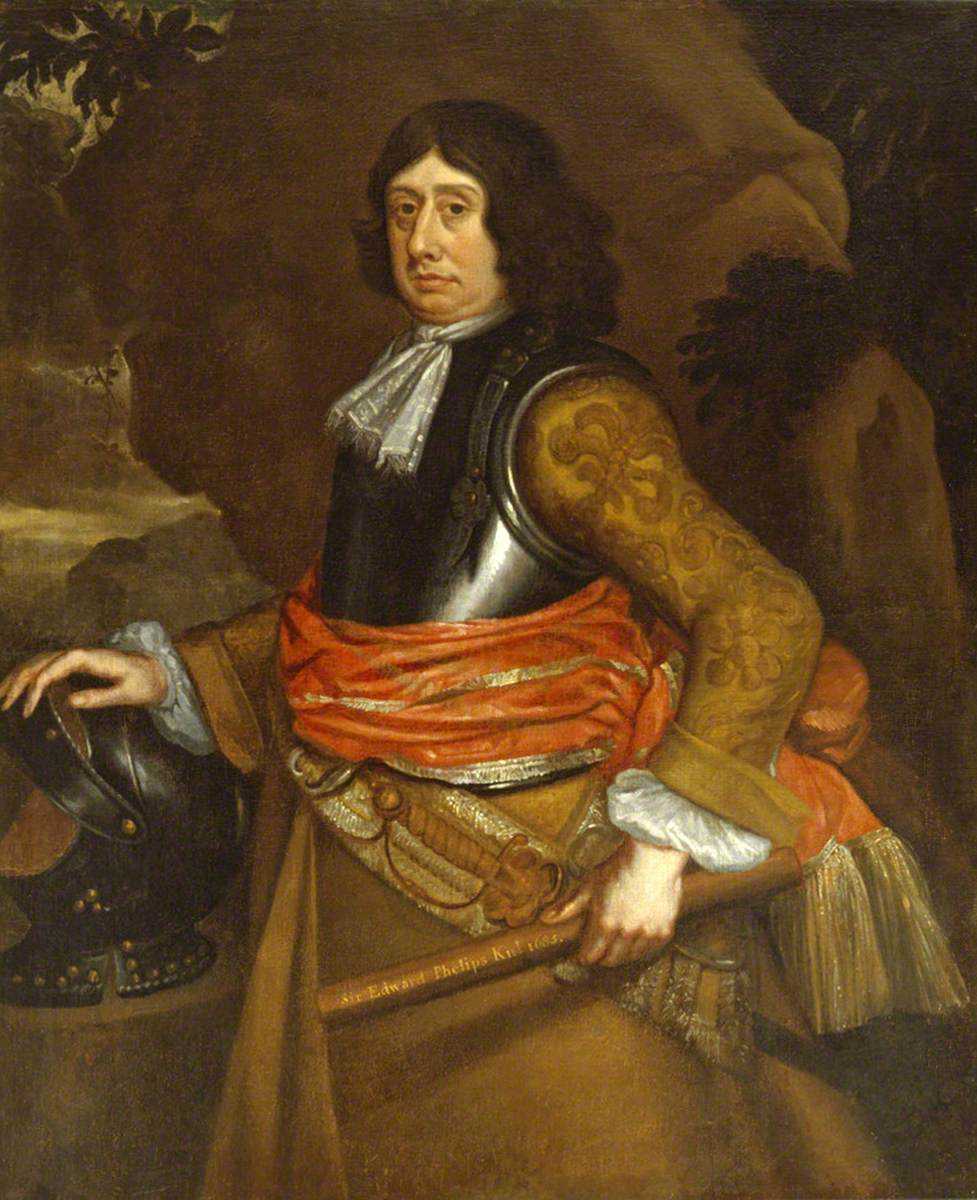
- Born: 1638
- Died: 4 April 1699 (aged 60–61)
- Occupation: Politician
- Spouse(s): Edith Blake
- Children: 3
- Parent(s): Edward Phelips; Anne Pye

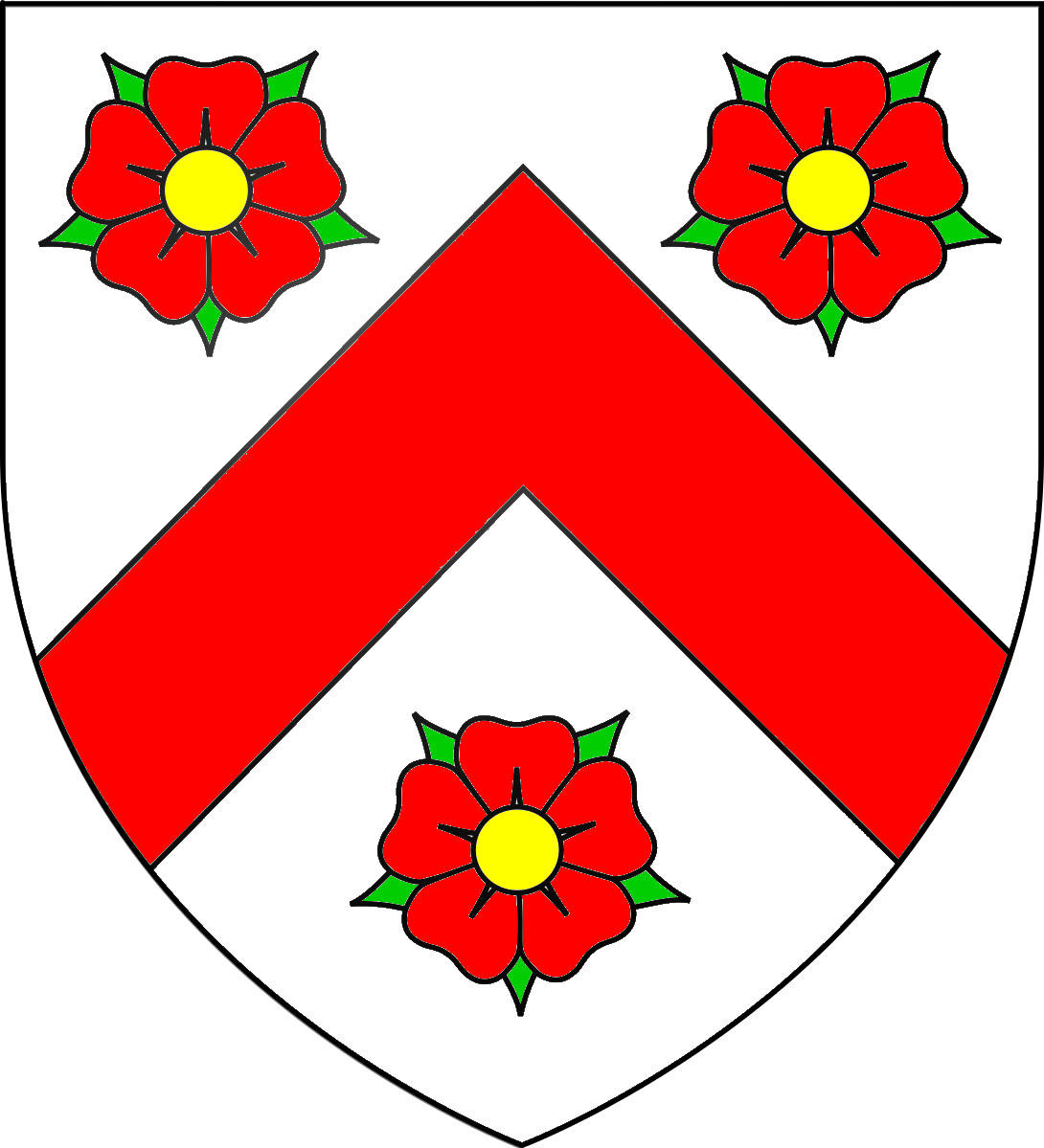
Arms of Phelips: Argent, a chevron gules between three roses of the second seeded or barbed vert

Sir Edward Phelips Jr. esq of Montacute (1638 – 4 April 1699) was an English landowner and politician who sat in the House of Commons at various times between 1661 and 1699.

== Biography ==
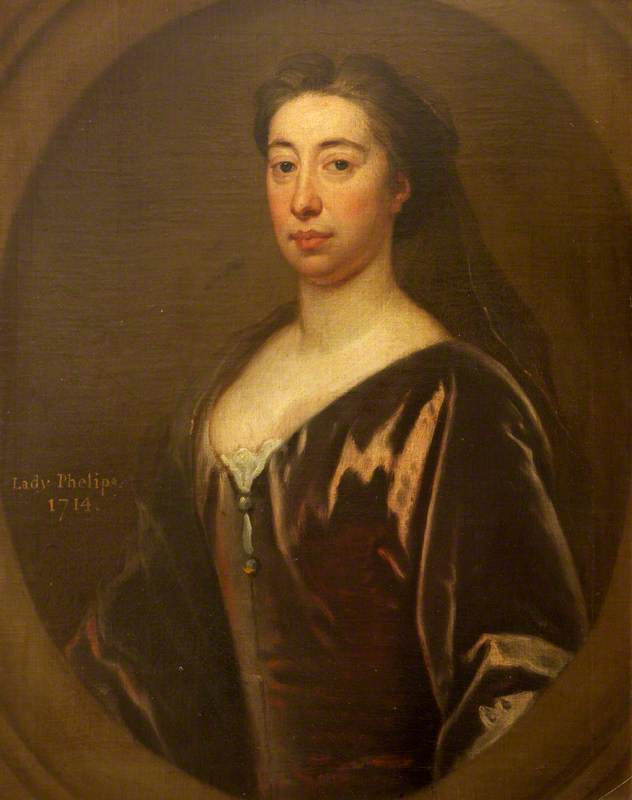
Edith Blake, 2nd wife of Edward Phelips

Phelips was the son of Edward Phelips of Montacute House and his wife Anne Pye, daughter of Sir Robert Pye of Faringdon, Berkshire. He was baptised on 26 September 1638. He was a lieutenant of militia horse in Somerset by 1661. In 1661, he was elected Member of Parliament for Ilchester in the Cavalier Parliament. He was commissioner for assessment from 1661 to 1680, joint auditor of excise in 1662, commissioner of corporations from 1662 to 1663 and J.P. from 1662 to February 1688. He was knighted by 24 April 1666 and was lieutenant-colonel of horse in the militia in the same year. In 1675, he was a commissioner for recusants 1675. He was high steward of Ilchester from 1679 to his death and a colonel of militia horse, Somerset between 1679 and 1687. In 1680, he was foreman of the grand jury, and succeeded to Montacute on the death of his father in the same year. He was also steward of crown manors in Somerset from 1680 and Deputy Lieutenant between 1680 and 1687. He was chairman of quarter sessions from 1681 to January 1688. In 1685, he was elected MP for Ilchester again. He was restored to his positions as J.P in October 1688 and Deputy Lieutenant in 1689. He was commissioner for assessment from 1689 to 1690 and became JP again in March 1690. In 1690, he was elected MP for Somerset. He was vice admiral from 1690 to 1696. In 1698, he was elected MP for Somerset again. He died on 4 April 1699, aged 60 or 61, and was buried at Montacute.

== Family ==
Phelips married firstly in about 1667, Dorothy Bury, widow of John Bury of Colleton Barton, Chulmleigh, Devon, and daughter of Henry Cheeke of West Newton, North Petherton, Somerset. They had no children and she died on 19 November 1678. He married secondly in about 1683, Edith Blake, daughter of John Blake, ironmonger, of Langport, Somerset and had three daughters: Anne, Elizabeth and Edith. Phelips' daughter, Anne married her cousin Edward Phelips and their daughter, Bridget married Sir Gerrard Napier, 5th Baronet of Middle March.
