= Thomas Lockyer (MP) =

Member of the Parliament of Great Britain

Thomas Lockyer (1699-1785), of Mapperton, near Ilchester, Somerset and New Buildings, Coleman Street, London, was an English businessman. He was a Member of Parliament for Ilchester (UK Parliament constituency) 1747 - 1761.
