= Ilchester (constituency) =

Former parliamentary constituency in the United Kingdom

- Former borough constituency for the House of Commons

1621–1832

Ilchester was a constituency of the House of Commons of the Parliament of England, then of the Parliament of Great Britain from 1707 to 1800 and of the Parliament of the United Kingdom from 1801 to 1832. It was represented by two Members of Parliament until 1832. It was one of the most notoriously corrupt rotten boroughs.

== History ==
The constituency was a parliamentary borough in Somerset, first represented in the English Parliament in 1298 but thereafter returning MPs only occasionally until its right to representation was revived by a resolution of the House of Commons in 1621. The borough comprised the parish of Ilchester, originally a market town of some size but greatly declined by the 19th century; its former lace and silk industries were almost entirely extinct, and it subsisted mainly on trade arising from its position on the New Direct Road, the main road between London and Exeter (now the A303) and the Fosse Way. In 1831, the population of the borough was approximately 965, and contained 231 houses; the whole town, which extended slightly beyond the borough boundaries, had 248 houses.

Ilchester was a "potwalloper" borough, meaning that the right to vote was exercised by all inhabitant householders not receiving alms (a household being theoretically defined by having a separate hearth on which a pot could be boiled); in the 18th century this amounted to a couple of hundred voters, who expected to receive full value in return for their votes, either at the time of election or later. This meant that elections were generally uncontested, as securing a seat was an expensive business. Bribery was widespread, and most of the elections at the start of the 18th century resulted in petitions by the losing candidates which the Commons had to investigate. Oldfield reports that the price of a vote was 2 guineas in 1702, but had risen to 30 guineas by 1768.

In 1702 one of the candidates at the previous year's election, John Webb, was arrested and committed to the custody of the sergeant at arms for bribery, as was the bailiff who (as returning officer) had asked for a £100 bribe to declare a candidate elected even if he had fewer votes than his opponents. A petition in 1709 stated that the sitting members had ordered two thousand pairs of shoes to keep all the shoemakers of the borough employed, although this petition was later withdrawn.

At the 1774 election a petition from the defeated candidates alleged bribery and treating against the sitting members as well as partiality by the returning officer and, after investigation, the Commons declared the election void and a writ for a new election was issued. (This indicated that they considered the petitioners as guilty as their opponents, since the committee could otherwise have recommended to the House that they should be declared duly elected in the original poll.)

Even when there was no open scandal, considerable sums passed hands in Ilchester elections. In his study of the 1754 election, Lewis Namier mentions the government's arrangements to secure the election of its candidates there. The Whig interests in the borough at this time were managed by one of the MPs, Thomas Lockyer, nicknamed "Snowball" for the way in which he accumulated money, and the government spent £1000 on securing the election of John Talbot as the other member. It appears that Talbot was expected to produce £1000 of his own to purchase the seat, but whether this was in addition to the government's expenditure or merely to reimburse it is not clear. At around the same period Lord Chesterfield records in his Letters to His Son that he investigated buying him a seat in Parliament at Ilchester and was quoted a price of £1500.

At the turn of the 19th century, most of the property in the borough was bought by Sir William Manners (who later became Lord Huntingtower), who set about turning it into a pocket borough with the intention of becoming one of its MPs and nominating the other. At first the voters defied him, taking bribes from both sides, and at the election of 1802 he was defeated; but on petition evidence of "a system of corruption" was uncovered and the committee named 32 voters who had received bribes – a substantial proportion of the entire electorate – as well as finding the sitting MPs guilty of treating though not of bribery. The election was declared void, and a new election held; but this by-election produced yet another petition, and Manners himself was disqualified for bribery. After this reverse, however, he took more drastic action to secure his influence, having most of the houses in the town pulled down (their former occupiers thereby losing their votes), reducing the electorate to about 60. Oldfield records that he erected a workhouse in their place, where many of the former voters – having relied on selling their votes for their livelihood – ended up. The remaining voters were, predictably, somewhat more co-operative.

Ilchester was abolished as a separate constituency by the Great Reform Act 1832. The voters not unnaturally resisted the reform, even defying their patron to do so, and after their MP James Hope-Vere had voted for the Reform Bill in the 1830 Parliament he had to be found another seat as he had no chance of re-election at Ilchester. After abolition, the town was placed in the new Western Somerset county division.

== Members of Parliament ==
=== MPs 1298–1629 ===
| Parliament | First member | Second member |
|---|---|---|
Ilchester's right to return Members restored, 1621
| Parliament of 1621–1622 | Sir Richard Wynn | Arthur Jarvis |
| Happy Parliament (1624–1625) | Sir Richard Wynn | Nathaniel Tomkins Also elected for Christchurch; In his place Edmund Waller |
| Useless Parliament (1625) | Richard Wynn | Sir Robert Gorges |
| Parliament of 1625–1626 | Sir William Beecher | Robert Caesar |
| Parliament of 1628–1629 | Sir Robert Gorges | Sir Henry Berkeley |
No Parliament summoned 1629–1640

=== MPs 1640–1832 ===
| Year | First Member | First Party | Second Member | Second Party |
|---|---|---|---|---|
| April 1640 | Edward Phelips | | Sir Henry Berkeley | |
| November 1640 | Robert Hunt | Royalist | Sir Henry Berkeley | |
| 1640 (?) | Robert Hunt | Royalist | Edward Phelips | Royalist |
| February 1644 | Hunt and Phelips disabled to sit – both seats vacant | | | |
| 1645 | Colonel William Strode | | Thomas Hodges | |
| December 1648 | Strode and Hodges excluded in Pride's Purge – both seats vacant | | | |
| 1653 | Ilchester was unrepresented in the Barebones Parliament and the First and Second Parliaments of the Protectorate | | | |
| January 1659 | Richard Jones | | John Barker | |
| May 1659 | Not represented in the restored Rump | | | |
| April 1660 | Robert Hunt | | Henry Dunster | |
| 1661 | Edward Phelips | | Henry Dunster | |
| 1679 | William Strode | | John Speke | |
| 1681 | Sir John St Barbe | | John Hody | |
| 1685 | Sir Edward Wyndham | | Sir Edward Phelips | |
| 1689 | Sir Edward Wyndham | | William Helyar | |
| 1690 | Sir Edward Wyndham | | John Hunt | |
| 1695 | Sir Francis Wyndham | | John Hunt | |
| 1698 | Sir Francis Wyndham | | John Phelips | |
| Jan. 1701 | Sir Philip Sydenham | | James Anderton | |
| Nov. 1701 | Sir Francis Wyndham | | James Anderton | |
| 1705 | Edward Strode | | John Webb | |
| 1708 | Edward Phelips | | James Johnston | |
| 1710 | Edward Phelips | | Samuel Masham | |
| 1711 | Edward Phelips | | Sir James Bateman | |
| 1715 | William Bellamy | | John Hopkins | |
| Mar. 1722 | William Burroughs | | Daniel Moore | |
| Dec. 1722 | Thomas Paget | | Daniel Moore | |
| 1727 | Charles Lockyer | | Thomas Crisp | |
| 1734 | Charles Lockyer | | Sir Robert Brown | |
| 1747 | Francis Fane | | Thomas Lockyer | |
| 1754 | Hon. John Talbot | | Thomas Lockyer | |
| 1754 | Joseph Tolson Lockyer | | Thomas Lockyer | |
| Mar. 1761 | Joseph Tolson Lockyer | | The Earl of Egmont | |
| Dec. 1761 | Joseph Tolson Lockyer | | William Wilson | |
| 1765 | Peter Legh | | William Wilson | |
| 1768 | Peter Legh | | Sir Brownlow Cust, Bt. | Tory |
| 1774 | Peregrine Cust | | William Innes | |
| 1775 | Nathaniel Webb | | Owen Salusbury Brereton | |
| 1780 | Peregrine Cust | | Samuel Smith | |
| 1784 | Peregrine Cust | | Benjamin Bond-Hopkins | |
| 1785 | John Harcourt | | Benjamin Bond-Hopkins | |
| 1786 | Captain George Johnstone | Independent | Benjamin Bond-Hopkins | |
| 1787 | George Sumner | | Benjamin Bond-Hopkins | |
| 1790 | John Harcourt | | Samuel Long | |
| 1796 | Sir Robert Clayton | | William Dickinson | |
| 1799 | Lewis Bayly (Bayly Wallis from 1800) | | William Dickinson | |
| 1802 | William Hunter | | Thomas Plummer | |
| 1803 | Sir William Manners, Bt | Tory | Charles Brooke | |
| 1804 | John Manners | | Charles Brooke | |
| 1806 | Sir William Manners, Bt | Tory | Nathaniel Saxon | Whig |
| 1807 | Richard Brinsley Sheridan | Whig | Michael Angelo Taylor | Whig |
| 1812 | Hon. John Ward | Tory | George Philips | Whig |
| 1818 | Sir Isaac Coffin, Bt. | Whig | John William Drage Merest | Whig |
| 1820 | Sir Isaac Coffin, Bt. | Whig | Stephen Lushington | Whig |
| 1826 | Richard Sharp | Whig | John Williams | Whig |
| 1827 | Hon. Lionel Tollemache | Tory | Hon. Felix Tollemache | Tory |
| 1830 | Michael Bruce | Whig | James Joseph Hope-Vere | Whig |
| 1831 | Hon. Edward Petre | Whig | Stephen Lushington | Whig |
| 1832 | Constituency disenfranchised | | | |

== See also ==
- List of former United Kingdom Parliament constituencies
- Unreformed House of Commons
