= Weycroft, Axminster =

Historic manor in Devon, England

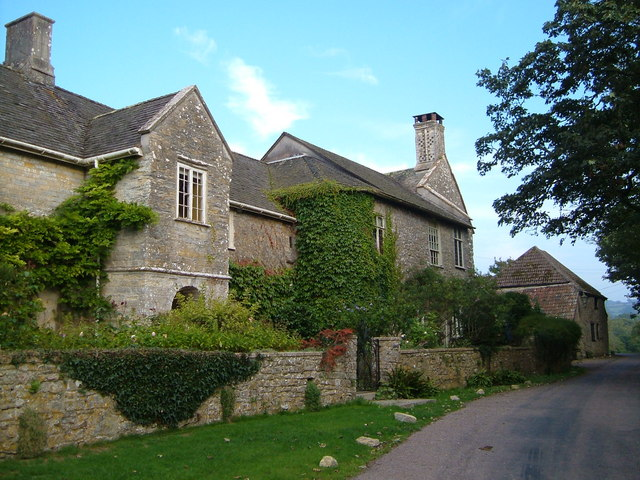
The manor house at Weycroft in 2006

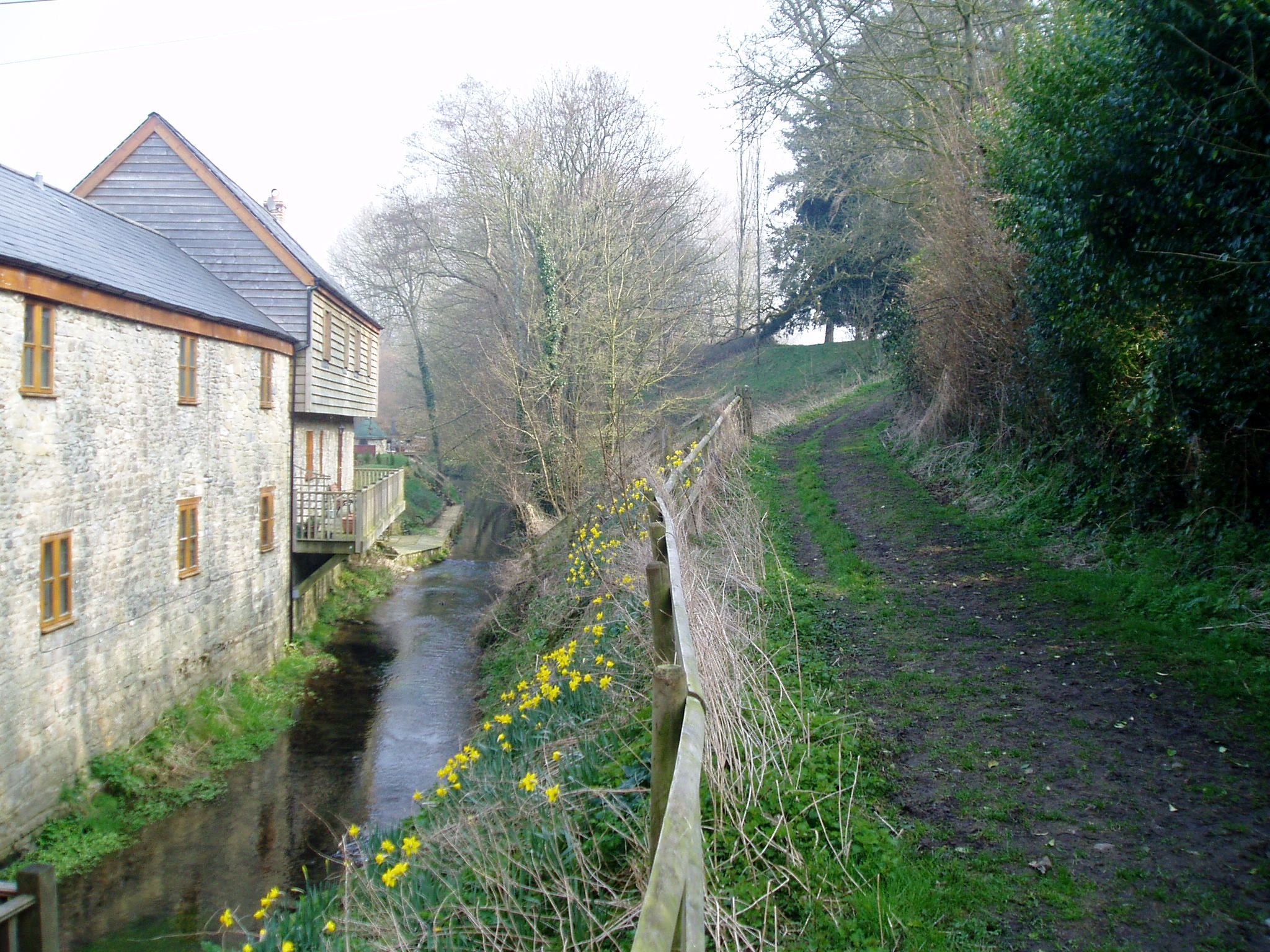
Weycroft Mill in 2009, the site of the ancient manorial mill

Weycroft (anciently Wigoft, Wicroft, etc.) is an historic manor in the parish of Axminster in Devon, England. The surviving manor house known as "Weycroft Hall" is a Grade I listed building which includes elements from the 15th, 16th and 17th centuries, with a great hall of circa 1400, and was restored in the 19th century.

== Descent ==
=== Pomeroy ===
Arms of Pomeroy, adopted at the start of the age of heraldry, c. 1200-1215: Or, a lion rampant guardant gules armed and langued azure a bordure engrailed sable

The manor of Wigegroste is listed in the Domesday Book of 1086 as the 52nd of the 58 Devonshire landholdings of Ralph de la Pomeroy (d. pre-1100), (alias Pomeraie, Pomerei, etc.), 1st feudal baron of Berry Pomeroy in Devon, one of the Devon Domesday Book tenants-in-chief of King William the Conqueror. He was lord of the manor of La Pommeraye, Calvados in Normandy and was one of the two commissioners appointed to carry to the royal treasury at Winchester the tax collected in Devon resulting from the assessment made based upon the Domesday Book survey. Ralph's tenant at Wyecroft was a certain Roger, possibly Roger of Courseulles. The pre-Norman Conquest holder was a Saxon named "Viking" (who held Axminster itself), whose large Devonshire landholdings lay entirely within Ralph's future barony and within that of his brother William Cheever, feudal baron of Bradninch, Devon. Viking's holdings within Ralph's future barony were: Peamore (in Exminster), Huxham, Clyst St George, Heavitree and within William Cheever's future barony he held: Exminster, Matford, Hewise, Awliscombe, Whipton (in Heavitree) and Axminster.

=== de Wigoft ===
The next recorded holder was the de Wigoft family, formerly surnamed Gelond. John de Wigoft (son of Henry de Wigoft) was the last in the male line and married Jone Chiderlegh, daughter and heiress of Richard Chiderlegh, by whom he had a daughter and heiress Jone de Wigoft, who married John Gobodislegh.

=== Gobodislegh ===
Arms of Gobodislegh: Sable, a fess chequy or and gules between three crosses patée of the second, as seen sculpted in relief on the monument of Denys Rolle (1614–1638) in the Rolle Mausoleum in Bicton Old Church, Devon

John Gobodislegh (alias Gabodsleigh, Gabadesley alias Dadscombe, Goboldsley, Gobadsbey, etc.) married Jone de Wigoft, heiress of Weycroft, and thus acquired the manor. However he died without male issue, leaving a daughter and sole heiress Thomazine Gobodislegh, who married John Cristenstow. However, in the Book of Fees (c.1302), a certain Henry Gobaud' held land in "Wicrofte" from the feudal barony of Berry Pomeroy.

=== Cristenstow ===
Arms of Cristenstow of Weycroft: Azure, a bend party per bend indented or and ermine two cotises of the third

John Cristenstow married Thomazine Gobodislegh, heiress of Weycroft, by whom he had issue William Cristenstow (fl.1377/99), who purported to grant the manor to Sir Thomas II Brooke (died 1418) (son of Thomas I Brooke (d.1367) of Brooke, Ilchester), of nearby Holditch Castle in the parish of Thorncombe, Devon (now Dorset), "by far the largest landowner in Somerset" and 13 times a Member of Parliament for Somerset, whose monumental brass survives in Thorncombe Church. However the grant was later deemed legally imperfect. William Cristenstow died without issue, leaving as his heiress his sister Alis Cristenstow, wife of Richard (or John) Dennis of Giddicott in the parish of Bradford in Devon.

=== Dennis ===
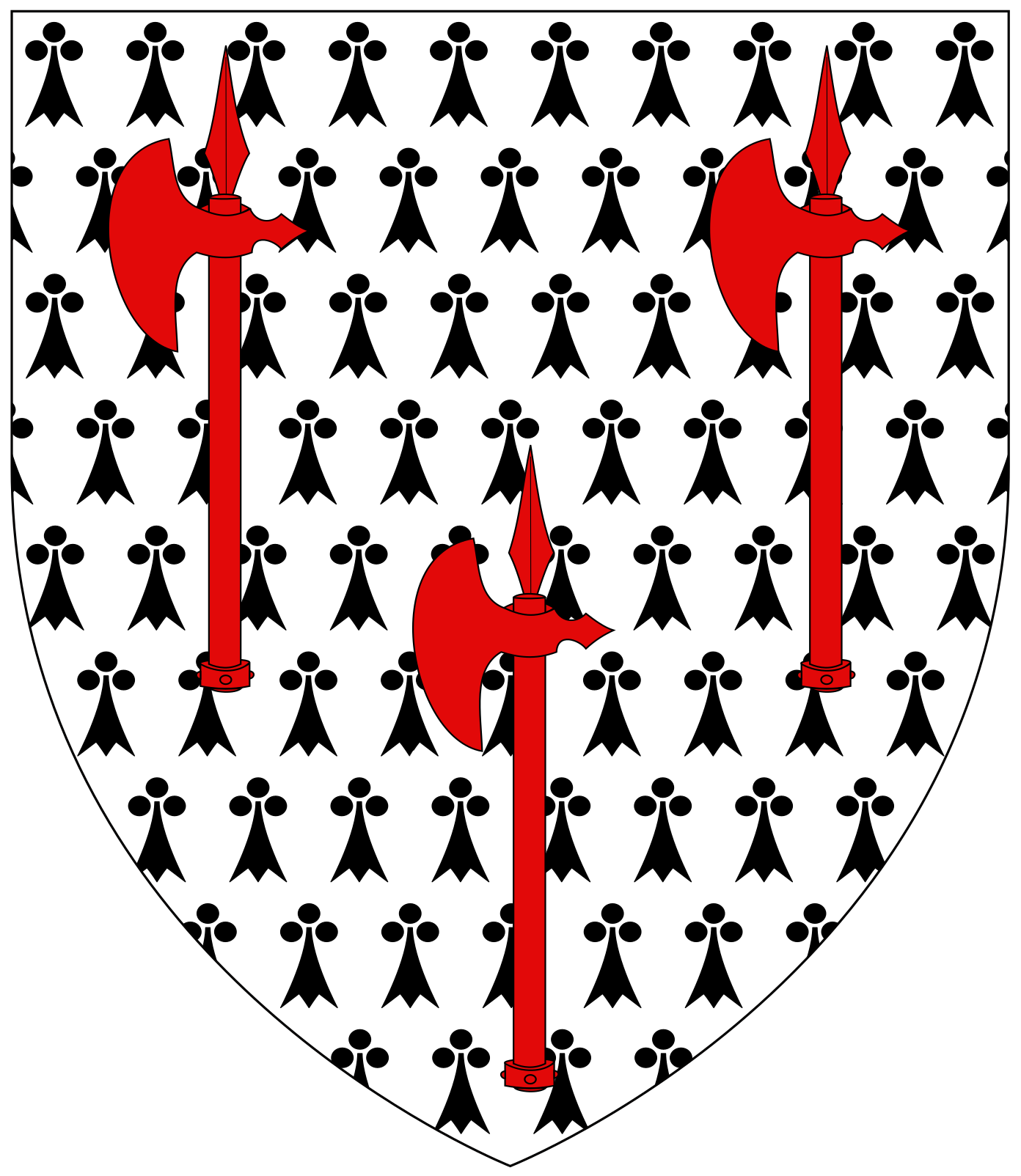
Arms of Dennis of Weycroft, Holcombe Burnell & Bicton, Devon: Ermine, three Danish battle-axes erect gules

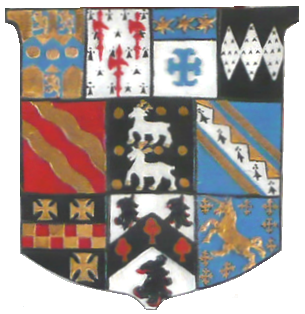
Arms of Denys Rolle (1614–1638) on his monument in the Rolle Mausoleum in Bicton Old Church, showing 10 quarters including: 2: Dennis of Weycroft, 6: Bockerell, 7: Cristenstowe of Weycroft, 8: Gobodislegh of Weycroft and 9: Chiderleigh, illustrating part of the descent of Weycroft

Richard (or John) Dennis married Alis Cristenstow, heiress of Weycroft. He was the son and heir of Walter Dennis of Giddicott, by his wife Maude Buckerell, daughter and heiress of Henry Buckerell of Buckerell, apparently in the parish of Heavitree near Exeter. Walter Dennis was the son of John Dennis by his wife Jane Dabernon, daughter and heiress of John Dabernon of Bradford, Devon. The descent of Weycroft from Richard (or John) Dennis and Alis Cristenstow was as follows:

- Walter Dennis of Giddicott, son and heir, who married Isotte Durnford, a daughter of Stephen Durnford of Stonehouse, Plymouth.
- Thomas Dennis, son and heir, who in 1430 reached a settlement regarding Weycroft with Sir Thomas III Brooke (c.1391-1439) of Holditch (son of Sir Thomas II Brooke who had received a legally imperfect grant of Weycroft from William Cristenstow). The settlement resulted in Thomas Dennis swapping the manor of Weycroft for the Brooke manor of Holcombe Burnell, near Exeter, which thenceforth became the seat of the Dennis family, which went on to great prominence in Devon and whose eventual heir was Denys Rolle (1614–1638) of Stevenstone in Devon, Sheriff of Devon in 1636, who inherited the large Dennis landholdings centred on Bicton, Devon. By the 19th century the Rolle family had become the largest landowner in Devon, as revealed by the Return of Owners of Land, 1873. Thomas Dennis married twice: firstly to Alice (or Mawde) Bampfield, a daughter of Sir Thomas Bampfield, lord of the manor of Poltimore in Devon, the descendants of which marriage inherited Bradford as their seat and secondly to Elizabeth Hatch, a daughter of Haukyn (or Robert) Hatch of Woolleigh, Beaford in Devon, the descendants of which marriage inherited Holcombe Burnell.

=== Brooke ===
Arms of Brooke of Weycroft & of Holditch in the parish of Thorncombe, Devon (now Dorset), Barons Cobham: Gules, on a chevron argent a lion rampant sable crowned or

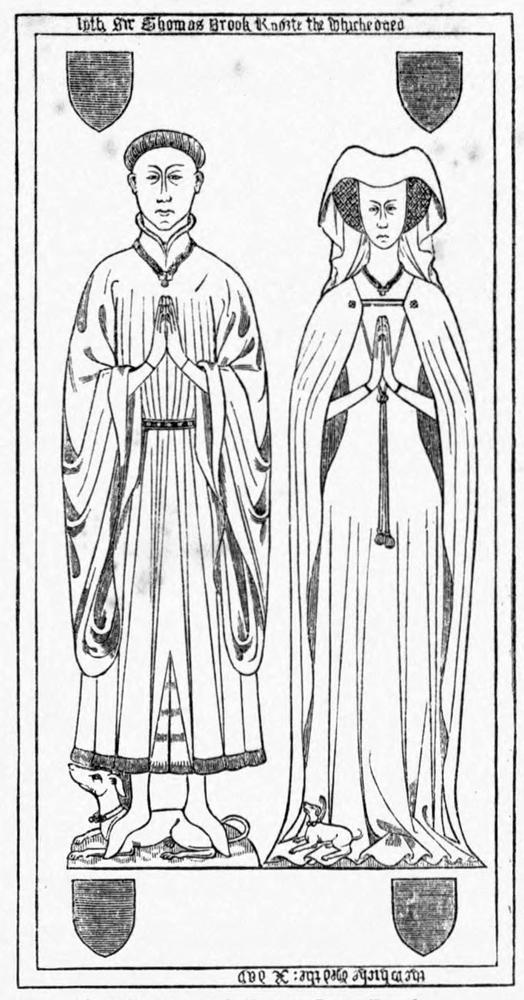
Monumental brass of Sir Thomas II Brooke (died 1418) and his wife Joan Hanham (d.1437), Thorncombe Church

Sir Thomas III Brooke (c.1391-1439) was a Member of Parliament for Dorset and Somerset, and was the husband of the heiress Joan Braybrooke (1404-1442), suo jure 5th Baroness Cobham, via her mother Joan de la Pole (d.1434). After his marriage he moved to his wife's home at the manor of Cobham in Kent, where his descendants attained much prominence as Barons Cobham and rebuilt that manor house into one of the largest and most important in Kent. They flourished there until 1603 when Henry Brooke, 11th Baron Cobham (1564–1619) was attainted for his part in a plot to overthrow King James I, when the peerage became abeyant and his lands were forfeited to the crown.

The Brooke family (anciently "de la Brook" or "At-Brook") originated at the estate of "la Brook" near Ilchester in Somerset. Thomas II Brooke, the first prominent member of that family, made Weycroft his seat "with newe building castlewise" (Pole (d.1635)); Risdon (d.1640) states that he "built here, on the rising of an hill, a fair new house, castle-like, and enclosed a large and spacious park, being a very pleasant scite over the river (i.e. River Axe) and hath a good prospect". This refers to a royal licence to crenellate and empark dated 1427, granted to Sir Thomas III Brooke and his probable feoffees Humfrey, Duke of Gloucester, Sir Giles Daubeney and others:

"To enclose a park of eight hundred acres and to crenellate the mansion with stones and lime to enclose, crenellate, turrellate and embattle their manor (house) of Wycroft, in Axminstre, and make a park there, with all liberties and franchises, so that no one should flee into it, or enter to seize anyone without leave" (Latin: Manerium situm de Wycroft in Axminstre, cum petris et calce includere krenellare et battellare et octingentas acras terre et bond in Axminstre includere et parcum inde facere possint.

The creation of the huge 800 acre deer park caused a dispute with his powerful neighbour at nearby Shute House, William Bonville, 1st Baron Bonville (1392-1461). William Henry Hamilton Rogers wrote as follows in 1877:

"In 1428, Abbot Nicholas Wysbeche of Newenham (Abbey) was appointed a mediator, with five of his neighbours, in a dispute between Sir William Bonville and Joan Hanham, the widow of Sir Thomas I Brooke, arising from the obstruction of several public roads and paths in the formation and inclosure of the park at Weycroft by the lady and her son. The transcript of the instrument has been preserved which recites the circumstances of the case at great length, and concludes with an award, which, as the Abbot was nominated to his position by the Lady Brooke, does credit to his justice as an umpire as well as to his hospitality; for after deciding on every point in favour of Sir William Bonville, and directing all the ways in question to be thrown open to the public, it concludes by directing that the knight and the lady should ride amicably together to Newenham Abbey, on a day appointed, when they should exchange a kiss in token of peace and friendship, and dine together at the Abbot's table. The deed is dated at Axminster, on the 13 August 1428".

Sir Thomas III Brooke's son was Edward Brooke, 6th Baron Cobham (c. 1415–1464). On the attainder in 1603 of Henry Brooke, 11th Baron Cobham (1564–1619), the family's lands were forfeited to the crown.

=== Blount ===
Weycroft and other lands were re-granted in fee-farm by King King James I to Charles Blount, 1st Earl of Devonshire, 8th Baron Mountjoy (1563-1606) Lord Deputy of Ireland under Queen Elizabeth I and Lord Lieutenant of Ireland under James I.

=== Bennett ===
Sir Thomas Bennet, (1543-1627), a merchant of the City of London, Lord Mayor of London in 1603/4, Sheriff of London for 1594-95 and Master of the Mercers' Company in 1595/6, purchased Weycroft from the feoffees of Charles Blount, 1st Earl of Devonshire, and was succeeded by one of his sons, namely John Bennet. In 1627 Sir Thomas's elder son Sir Simon Bennet, 1st Baronet (c. 1584–1631) was created a baronet "of Bechampton in the County of Buckingham", but died without male issue when the baronetcy became extinct. Risdon (d.1640) stated that "the park is destroyed and the house begins to decay for want of a worthy dweller to make his abode there".

=== Later owners ===
"Wygoft", 1795 watercolour by Rev. John Swete

The manor of Weycroft was later split into two parts, one of which became the property of the Mallock family of Cockington Court, Tor Mohun, Devon and descended by marriage to Mr Bilk of Axminster, the owner in 1810. The other part in 1810 was owned by Rev. M. Tucker. In February 1795 the antiquary Rev. John Swete (1752-1821) of Oxton House, Kenton in Devon, visited Weycroft as part of his ongoing "Picturesque Tour of Devon" and painted a watercolour image of it, and recorded the event as follows in his Travel Journal:

The old house of Wygroft or Wycroft within a mile of the town (i.e. Axminster) "attracted my notice and from an avenue of ash in a field just beyond the turnpike gate I had a good view of it. The remains of the antient edifice consisted of a number of dilapidated walls - part of which about a century or so ago seem'd to have undergone some alterations and to have been converted into a more habitable dwelling - an idea however may be collected, from several parts of the pile that are now extant, that it must have been a place of strength and it seemed to me that the eminence on which it had been raised was in some degree artificial. The ivy which decorated this building added another trait of antiquity and there was a volume that coated the whole surface of a chimney which grew with such luxuriance and protruded its branches so far from it as to bear the strongest resemblance to a tree. The whole scene was picturesque and the pleasing effect was uncommonly heightened when beheld through the avenue of ash which was probably one of the approaches to the house from Axminster".

=== Present ownership ===
In 2016 at the end of a tenancy and having been owned by the same family for several generations, the seven-bedroom main house, three-bed annexe, one-bed cottage and three-bedroom lodge and 80 acres of land was offered for sale via estate agents Strutt & Parker in Exeter. In 2019 Weycroft Hall was in the occupation of "Weycroft Hall Ministries", a charity which "seeks to use the Hall as a centre for vibrant Christianity. It acts as a retreat centre, teaching base, church, and place of healing, restoration & prophecy".
