= Brooke, Ilchester =

Historic estate in England

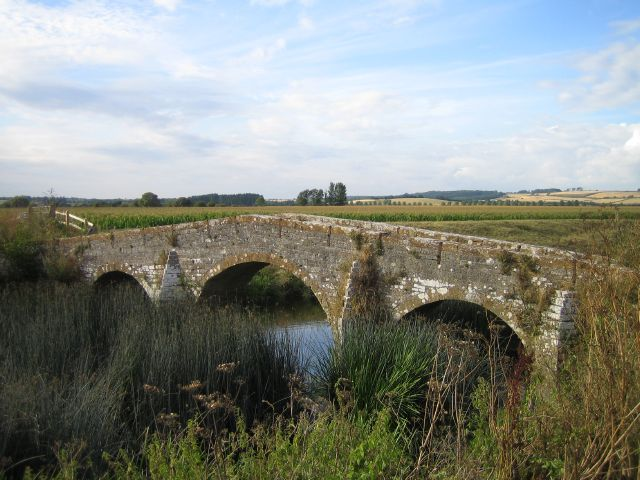
Pill Bridge, on the River Yeo, 2.3 km west of the town of Ilchester in Somerset, a narrow and ancient pack-horse bridge, the repair and maintenance of which in 1530 was the responsibility of the tenants of Brooke, Ilchester

Brooke (or la Brooke, Broke, Brook, etc.) in the parish of Ilchester in Somerset, England, was an historic estate, the earliest known seat of the prominent Brooke family, Barons Cobham.

== Location ==
The exact location of the mansion or manor house, later known as "Brooke's Court", is unknown and all physical traces of it have been lost. It was said by the Somerset historian Collinson to have been situated "without the walls (i.e. of the town of Ilchester) towards Montacute", which is to the south, thus probably to the west of the ancient estate of Sock Dennis, also situated to the immediate south of the town. Most of the estate lay in "Ilchester Mead" and included land "near the meadow of Sock and Martock". Possibly the name derives from the brook or stream, now known as Bearley Brook, which separates Ilchester from Sock Dennis and flows into the River Yeo 600 metres below Pill Bridge. The land extended to Pill Bridge, in the west, for the maintenance of which the estate was liable.

== Descent ==
=== Brooke ===
Arms of Brooke, Baron Cobham "of Kent": Gules, on a chevron argent a lion rampant sable crowned or

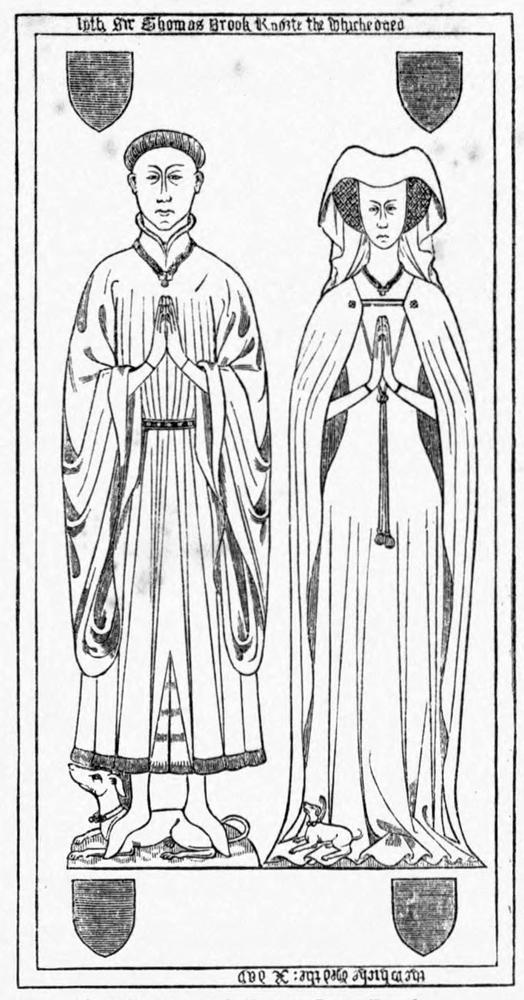
Monumental brass of Sir Thomas II Brooke (died 1418) of Holditch, "by far the largest landowner in Somerset" and 13 times a Member of Parliament for Somerset, and his wife Joan Hanham (died 1437), Thorncombe Church, Devon. Although a knight, he is dressed in civilian clothes rather than in armour. Both wear the Lancastrian Collar of Esses

The Brooke family (anciently "de la Brook" or "At-Brook") originated at the estate of "la Brook" next to (juxta) the town of Ilchester in Somerset, and later resided at Holditch in the parish of Thorncombe and at Weycroft in the parish of Axminster, both in Devon, both fortified manor houses. Following the marriage of Sir Thomas III Brooke (died 1439) of Holditch in the parish of Thorncombe, Devon to the heiress Joan Braybroke, suo jure 5th Baroness Cobham (died 1442), he moved his residence to the manor of Cobham, Kent. The descent of the estate of Brooke is given as follows by Raphael Holinshed (c. 1525–1580?) in his Chronicles of England, which is followed by the Somerset historian Collinson (d.1793):

- Henry I de la Brooke (fl. 13th.c.) established the estate from lands which he acquired both through his marriage to a daughter of Roger de Gouvis (d. 1231), lord of the manor of Kingsdon (2 miles north of Ilchester), and through his own purchases.
- William de la Brook, of "the Brook-juxta-Ivelchester";
- Henry II de la Brook, who married Nichola Gonvile, a daughter of Bryan Gonvile (or Gonevile). It was possibly this Henry de Broc (or his son) who first acquired the manor of Holditch in Devon (since 1844 in Dorset) from Reginald II de Mohun (1206–1258), Feudal baron of Dunster in Somerset, who had inherited it from his first wife Hawise Fleming, daughter and heiress of William Fleming.
- Henry III de la Brook;
- Henry IV de la Brook (d.1324), who married a certain Elizabeth;
- John de la Brook (d.1348) (alias "At-Brook"), who married Joan Bardstone, a daughter of Sir John Bardstone. In 1325 Brooke was a substantial property held in-chief from the crown which contributed a substantial sum to the fee farm of the borough of Ilchester. By 1331 the estate comprised 84 acres of arable land, and 46 acres of meadow. He died holding a messuage (i.e.house) with a curtilage (i.e. court-yard) and garden with one carucate of land at "the Brook without the walls of the town of Ivelchester", which he held by feudal tenure from the commonalty of that town and also held land at Sock Dennis, Bishopston and Kingston;
- Sir Thomas I Brooke (d.1367) married Constance Markensfeld. In 1357 he granted to Thomas Waryn rents payable out of his lands in "la Broke-juxta-Ivelchester" and in the town of Ivelchester.
- Sir Thomas II Brooke (d.1418), son and heir, of Holditch was the first prominent member of his family. He was thirteen times a Member of Parliament for Somerset. Thomas II Brooke made his seat at Holditch, having in 1397 received royal licence to "strengthen with a wall of stone and lime his manor of Holditch and enclose and make a park of 200 acres of pasture and wood ... including a deer leap in the park". Due to his marriage to a wealthy widow, Sir Thomas II Brooke was "by far the largest landowner in Somerset" and served 13 times as a Member of Parliament for Somerset. He married Joan Hanham, the second daughter and co-heiress of Simon Hanham of Gloucestershire, and the widow of the Bristol cloth merchant Robert Cheddar (died 1384), MP and twice Mayor of Bristol, "whose wealth was proverbial". She held many of Cheddar's estates after his death as her dower and died seized of 20 manors in Somerset and others elsewhere. Her son Richard Cheddar, MP, signed over his large inheritance to his mother and stepfather Sir Thomas II Brooke for their lives, due to the latter having "many times endured great travail and cost" in defending them during his minority. The monumental brass of Sir Thomas II Brooke and of his wife Joan Hanham, survives in Thorncombe Church.
- Sir Thomas III Brooke (d.1439), son and heir, a Member of Parliament for Dorset (once) and for Somerset (four times). Shortly after 1418 the estate of Brooke was described for the first time as a manor, held in-chief in free burgage. He made his seat at Weycroft in the parish of Axminster in Devon, "with newe building castlewise" (Pole (d.1635)); Risdon (d.1640) states that he "built here, on the rising of an hill, a fair new house, castle-like, and enclosed a large and spacious park, being a very pleasant scite over the river (i.e. River Axe) and hath a good prospect". This refers to a royal licence to crenellate and empark dated 1427, granted to Sir Thomas III Brooke and his probable feoffees Humfrey, Duke of Gloucester, Sir Giles Daubeney and others Sir Thomas III Brooke married the heiress Joan Braybrooke (1404-1442), suo jure 5th Baroness Cobham, via her mother Joan de la Pole (d.1434). After his marriage he moved to his wife's home at the manor of Cobham in Kent. His son was Edward Brooke, 6th Baron Cobham (died 1464), whose descendants attained much prominence as Barons Cobham and rebuilt that manor house into one of the largest and most important in Kent. They flourished there until 1603 when Henry Brooke, 11th Baron Cobham (1564–1619) was attainted for his part in a plot to overthrow King James I, when the peerage became abeyant and his lands were forfeited to the crown.
- Edward Brooke, 6th Baron Cobham (died 1464), son and heir;
- John Brooke, 7th Baron Cobham (died 1512), of Cobham Hall, who in 1481 let the estate of Brooke with 150 acres to John Hodges of Long Sutton and his son for the term of their lives. The Hodges family were succeeded as tenants in 1518 by William Rayment and others, and Rayment and three sons had a lease for lives in 1530.
- Thomas Brooke, 8th Baron Cobham (died 1529), son and heir by his father's second wife Margaret Nevill.
- George Brooke, 9th Baron Cobham (1497–1558), KG, eldest surviving son by his father's first wife Dorothy Haydon.
- William Brooke, 10th Baron Cobham (1527–1597), who still held the manor of Brooke at his death.
- Henry Brooke, 11th Baron Cobham (1564–1619), son and heir, who was attainted in 1603 for his part in a plot to overthrow King James I, when the peerage became abeyant and his lands were forfeited to the crown. He spent the rest of his life in the Tower of London and died in poverty.

=== Earth ===
Following the attainder of the 11th Baron, the estate of Brooke was granted by the King to Joseph Earth (d. 1609) of High Holborn, London. His heir was his brother Roger Earth, from whom it passed by means unknown to Sir Henry Berkeley of Yarlington in Somerset.

=== Berkeley ===
Sir Henry Berkeley of Yarlington was a Member of Parliament for Ilchester. His daughter and heiress was Dorothy Berkeley, wife of Sir Francis Godolphin (1605–1667).

=== Godolphin ===
Sir Francis Godolphin (1605–1667) married Dorothy Berkeley, the heiress of Brooke. In 1759 the manor of Brooke was owned by his grandson Francis Godolphin, 2nd Earl of Godolphin (1678–1766). The estate by then consisted of little else than the ownership of Pill Bridge.

== Sources ==
- Collinson, Rev. John, History and Antiquities of the County of Somerset, Vol.3, Bath, 1791, pp. 302–4
- Victoria County History, A History of the County of Somerset: Volume 3, London, 1974, Parishes: Ilchester, pp. 179–203
