= Thomas Pigott (Queen's County MP) =

Thomas Pigott (c. 1614–1674) was an Anglo-Irish landowner and Cavalier who was MP for Queen's County in the 1661 Irish House of Commons.

Pigott's great-grandfather had gained the estate of Dysart in Queen's County (now County Laois) in 1562, under the Settlement of Laois and Offaly Act 1556. His father, Major John Pigott, bought the manor of Brockley, Somerset, including Long Ashton, where Thomas Pigott grew up. Thomas' mother Martha was of the Colcloughs of Tintern Abbey, County Wexford. John Pigott, MP for Queen's County in 1634, was killed in 1646 during the Confederate Wars.

Thomas Pigott was master of the court of wards in Ireland and a member of the Irish Privy Council. He was a colonel in the Cavalier army. In 1648 he married Florence Poulett, widow of his Somerset neighbour, Thomas Smith. His heir John Pigott was elected for MP for Somerset in the 1705 election. After the Stuart Restoration Pigott signed a petition successfully requesting that John Harrington not be punished for having sat in the Protectorate Parliament.

There is a portrait of Thomas Pigott by John Hayls in the Weston Museum in Weston-super-Mare.
