= John Harrington (died 1654) =

John Harrington (c. 1589–1654) was an English politician who sat in the House of Commons from 1645.

Harrington was the son of Sir John Harrington, of Kelston, Somerset. He matriculated at Trinity College, Oxford on 7 December 1604 aged 15. He migrated to Cambridge University where he was incorporated in 1607. He was called to the bar at Lincoln's Inn in 1615. In 1645, Harrington was elected Member of Parliament for Somerset as a recruiter to the Long Parliament. His election was declared void in April 1646 and he was re-elected MP for Somerset in July 1646. He was secluded under Pride's Purge in December 1648. He was treasurer of his Inn in 1651.

Harrington died between 21 April 1654 when he made his will and 31 May 1654. He was the father of John who was also an MP.

Parliament of England
Preceded by Sir John Poulett; Sir John Stawell	Member of Parliament for Somerset; 1645–1648; With: George Horner	Succeeded by Not represented in Rump Parliament
