= Thomas Brooke (died 1418) =

Member of the Parliament of England

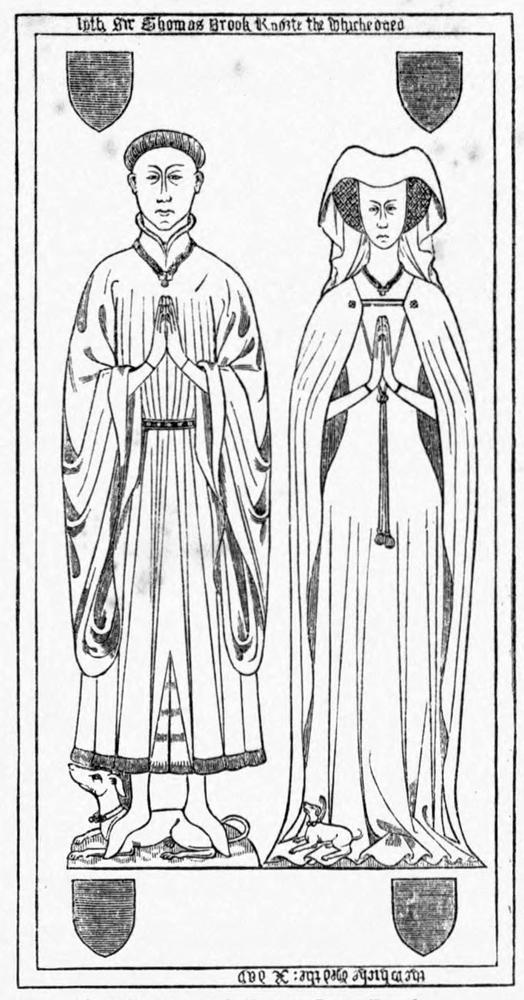
Monumental brass of Sir Thomas Brooke and his wife Joan Hanham Thorncombe Church, Devon. Although a knight, he is dressed in civilian clothes rather than in armour. Both wear the Lancastrian Collar of Esses

Arms of Brooke: Gules, on a chevron argent a lion rampant sable crowned or

Sir Thomas Brooke (c. 1355 - 1418) of Holditch in the parish of Thorncombe in Devon (since 1844 in Dorset) and of la Brooke in the parish of Ilchester in Somerset, was "by far the largest landowner in Somerset" and served 13 times as a Member of Parliament for Somerset (between 1386 and 1413). He was the first prominent member of his family, largely due to the great wealth he acquired from his marriage to a wealthy widow. The monumental brass of Sir Thomas Brooke and his wife survives in Thorncombe Church.

== Origins ==
He was the son and heir of Thomas Brooke (d. 1367) of Holditch and la Brooke-juxta-Ilchester, by his wife Constance Markensfeld (or Markensfield).

== Marriage and children ==
In about 1388 he married Joan Hanham (d. 1437), the second daughter and co-heiress of Simon Hanham of Gloucestershire, and the widow of the Bristol cloth merchant Robert Cheddar (died 1384), MP and twice Mayor of Bristol, "whose wealth was proverbial", comprising "17 manors, five advowsons and very extensive properties scattered throughout Devon, Dorset, Somerset and Gloucestershire, besides 17 messuages, 21 shops, four cellars, 160 tenements and an advowson, all in Bristol". She held many of Cheddar's estates after his death as her dower and died seized of 20 manors in Somerset and others elsewhere. Her son Richard Cheddar, MP, signed over his large inheritance to his mother and stepfather Sir Thomas Brooke for their lives, due to the latter having "many times endured great travail and cost" in defending them during his minority. By his wife he had issue including:

- Sir Thomas Brooke (1391/2 - 1439), son and heir, a Member of Parliament for Dorset (once) and for Somerset (four times). His marriage to the great heiress Joan Braybrooke (1404-1442), suo jure 5th Baroness Cobham, seems to have been arranged in 1410 by his father with Joan's step-father the Lollard leader Sir John Oldcastle, both then in Parliament together. After the marriage Thomas moved to his wife's home at the manor of Cobham in Kent. His son was Edward Brooke, 6th Baron Cobham (died 1464), whose descendants attained much prominence as Barons Cobham and rebuilt that manor house into one of the largest and most important in Kent. They flourished there until 1603 when Henry Brooke, 11th Baron Cobham (1564–1619) was attainted for his part in a plot to overthrow King James I, when the peerage became abeyant, his lands were forfeited to the crown, and he died in poverty in the Tower of London.

== Career ==
He was knighted at some time before 1386. In 1405 he was accorded the honour of being granted by King Henry IV six bucks and six does a year for life from the royal Forest of Neroche in Somerset, which grant was later confirmed by King Henry V.

He served 13 times as a Member of Parliament for Somerset, namely in 1386, Feb. 1388, 1391, 1393, 1395, Jan. 1397, Sept. 1397, 1399, 1402, Jan. 1404, 1407, 1410 and May 1413.

In 1415 he received from the king a grant for life (together with his wife) of the farm of the port of Lyme Regis in Dorset. This enabled him to control the pocket borough parliamentary seat of Lyme Regis, to which he appointed various of his close associates.

=== Acquires Weycroft ===
In about 1395 he acquired the manor of Weycroft in the parish of Axminster in Devon, which his son Thomas later made his seat, "with newe building castlewise" (Pole (d. 1635)); Risdon (d. 1640) states that he "built here, on the rising of an hill, a fair new house, castle-like, and enclosed a large and spacious park, being a very pleasant scite over the river (i.e. River Axe) and hath a good prospect". This refers to a royal licence to crenellate and empark dated 1427, granted to Sir Thomas Brooke and his probable feoffees Humfrey, Duke of Gloucester, Sir Giles Daubeney and others

=== Fortifies and embarks Holditch ===
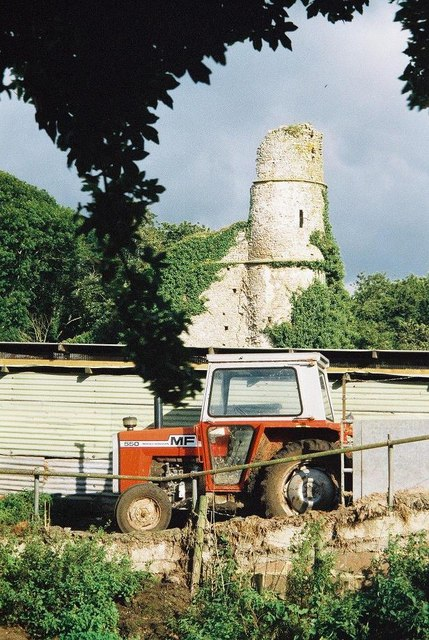
Remnants of a medieval fortified tower at today's Holditch Farm

The manor of Holditch in Devon (now (since 1844) in Dorset) had been acquired by his ancestor Henry de Broc (or de la Brooke) from Reginald de Mohun (1206–1258), Feudal baron of Dunster in Somerset, who had inherited it from his first wife Hawise Fleming, daughter and heiress of William Fleming. The later overlord of Holditch was the Courtenay family and Sir Thomas Brooke was in the retinue of his overlord there, Sir Philip Courtenay (1340–1406) of Powderham Castle in Devon, 5th or 6th son of Hugh Courtenay, 2nd Earl of Devon (1303–1377) of Tiverton Castle by his wife Margaret de Bohun. In 1397 Thomas received royal licence to "strengthen with a wall of stone and lime his manor of Holditch and enclose and make a park of 200 acres of pasture and wood ... including a deer leap in the park".

== Death and burial ==
He signed his will at Holditch on 25 May 1415, stating that he was then sick, but survived a further three years until his death on 23 or 24 January 1418. The phraseology used in his will, describing himself as a "wrichyd synner" with a "wreched unclene soule", suggests he was by religion a lollard, as does his wish to have a simple burial at Thorncombe, the parish church of Holditch. However his wife, who died 19 years later in 1437, appears to have ignored his request as the couple are buried together under the surviving elaborate ledger stone and monumental brasses in a prominent position within the church.

== Sources ==
- History of Parliament biography of Brooke, Sir Thomas (c.1355-1418), of Holditch in Thorncombe, Dorset and Weycroft in Axminster, Devon, published in The History of Parliament: the House of Commons 1386–1421, ed. J.S. Roskell, L. Clark, C. Rawcliffe., 1993
