= Lord Cobham =

Lord Cobham can refer to any of several holders of these titles:

- Baron Cobham, a title in the Peerage of England
- Viscount Cobham, a title in the Peerage of Great Britain
