= Sir John Sydenham, 2nd Baronet =

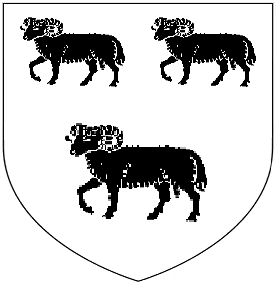
Arms of Sydenham: Argent, three rams passant guardant sable

Sir John Sydenham, 2nd Baronet (1643–1696) was an English politician who sat in the House of Commons at various times between 1665 and 1679.

Sydenham was the posthumous son of Sir John Sydenham, 1st Baronet of Brimpton, Somerset and his wife Anne Hare, daughter of Sir John Hare of Stow Bardolph, Norfolk, and his wife Elizabeth Coventry, daughter of Thomas Coventry, 1st Baron Coventry of Aylesborough. He was a baronet from birth. In November 1665, he was elected Member of Parliament for Somerset in the Cavalier Parliament but his election was declared void. He was elected MP for Somerset again in 1669 and was re-elected in 1679 for the First Exclusion Parliament.

Sydenham died at the age of 53.

Sydenham married firstly, Elizabeth Poulett, daughter of John Poulett, 2nd Baron Poulett of Hinton St George and his first wife, Catherine de Vere, daughter of Horace Vere, 1st Baron Vere of Tilbury. She died without issue and was buried at Brimpton in 1669. He married secondly, Mary Herbert, daughter of Philip Herbert, 5th Earl of Pembroke. She died in 1686, and was buried at Brimpton.

Parliament of England
Preceded by Sir John Warre; Edward Phelips	Member of Parliament for Somerset; 1669–1679; With: Edward Phelips 1669–1679; Sir Hugh Smith, 1st Baronet 1679	Succeeded by Sir William Portman, 6th Baronet; George Speke
Baronetage of England
Preceded by John Sydenham	Baronet (of Brimpton); 1643–1696	Succeeded by Philip Sydenham
