= Sir Hugh Smith, 1st Baronet =

English politician

Sir Hugh Smith, 1st Baronet (21 April 1632 – 26 July 1680) was an English politician who sat in the House of Commons in 1660 and 1679.

Smith was the son of Thomas Smith of Long Ashton, Somerset and his wife Florence Poulett, daughter of John Poulett, 1st Baron Poulett of Hinton St George, Somerset.

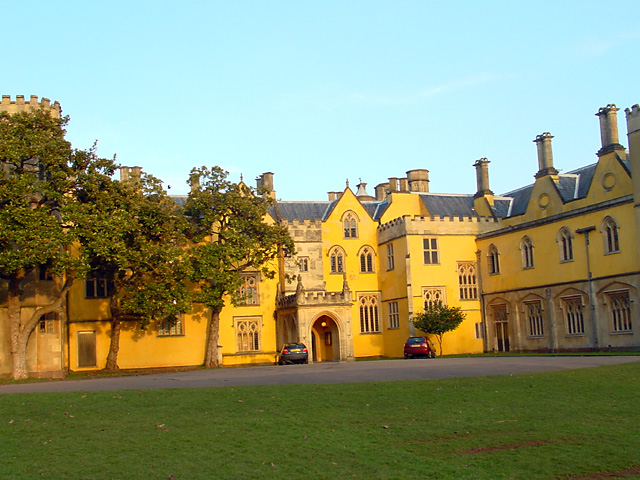
Ashton Court house – home of the Smith family

In 1660, Smith was elected Member of Parliament for Somerset in the Convention Parliament. He was created baronet of Ashton Court on 16 May 1661 following the English Restoration, in recognition of the family's loyalty to the Crown. He was appointed High Sheriff of Somerset for 1665–1666 and re-elected MP for Somerset in 1679.

Smith died at the age of 48. He had married Elizabeth Ashburnham, daughter of John Ashburnham of Ashburnham and was succeeded by his son John.

Parliament of England
Preceded by Not represented in the restored Rump	Member of Parliament for Somerset; 1660; With: George Horner	Succeeded by Sir John Stawell; Edward Phelips
Preceded by Sir John Sydenham; Edward Phelips	Member of Parliament for Somerset; 1679; With: Sir John Sydenham	Succeeded by Sir William Portman; George Speke
Baronetage of England
New creation	Baronet (of Long Ashton); 1661–1680	Succeeded by John Smith
