= Thomas Beauchamp (died 1444) =

English politician (died 1444)

Sir Thomas Beauchamp (died 2 February 1444) was an English politician. He sat as MP for Somerset in 1401, 1425, 1426, 1431 and 1432.

He was knighted on 11 October 1399.

== Political career ==
He also served as tax collector of Somerset in March 1404; commissioner to raise royal loans in Somerset in September 1405 and November 1419, in Somerset and Dorset in March 1431; commissioner of inquiry concerning extortion by the King's ministers in Somerset in December 1407, concerning trespass in Dorset in February 1410, concerning unlicensed market at Forde in Devon in April 1410, concerning the Cary estates in Somerset in November 1411, concerning concealed crown income in May 1428, concerning insurrection in July 1443; commissioner of array in June 1421 and January 1436; and commissioner of arrest in Somerset and Devon in July 1426.

== Family ==
He was possibly the younger son of John Beauchamp by his wife Joan. Before 1390, he married Elizabeth (died 1365/6), the daughter and co-heiress of Sir John Stretch and they had one son whom predeceased him. Before 1422, he married Eleanor, the daughter and heiress of Roger Silveyn and they had one daughter.
