= Sydenham baronets =

Extinct baronetcy in the Baronetage of England

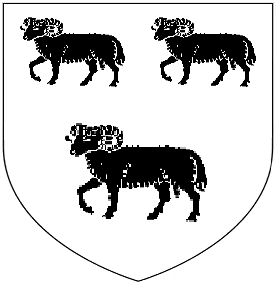
Arms of Sydenham: Argent, three rams passant guardant sable

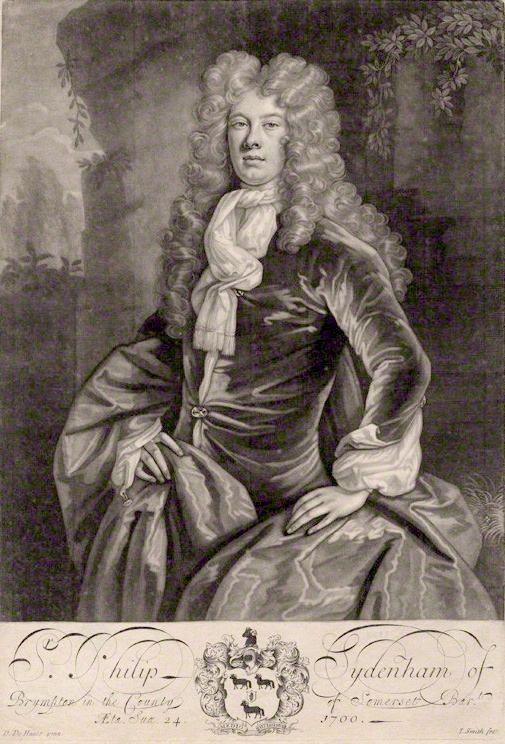
Sir Philip Sydenham, 3rd Baronet

The Sydenham Baronetcy, of Brimpton in the County of Somerset, was a title in the Baronetage of England. It was created on 28 July 1641 for John Sydenham of Brimpton, who the previous year had inherited the estates of his cousin Thomas Posthumous Hoby. The Sydenham family originated at the manor of Sydenham near Bridgwater, Somerset.

The second Baronet sat as member of parliament for Somerset. The third Baronet represented this constituency as well as Ilchester in Parliament. The title became extinct on his death in 1739.

== Sydenham baronets, of Brimpton (1641) ==
- Sir John Sydenham, 1st Baronet (c. 1620–1643)
- Sir John Sydenham, 2nd Baronet (1643–1696)
- Sir Philip Sydenham, 3rd Baronet (c. 1676–1739)
