= Baron Cobham =

Barony in the Peerage of Great Britain

Arms of Cobham of Cobham and Cooling

The title Baron Cobham has been created numerous times in the Peerage of England; often multiple creations have been extant simultaneously, especially in the fourteenth century.

The earliest creation was in 1313 for Henry de Cobham, 1st Baron Cobham, lord of the manors of Cobham and of Cooling, both in the county of Kent. The de Cobham family died out in the male line in 1408, with the death of the 3rd Baron Cobham, but the title continued via a female line to the Brooke family, which originated near Ilchester in Somerset. Henry Brooke, 11th Baron Cobham, was attainted in 1603, when the peerage became abeyant instead of becoming extinct. In 1916, the attainder was removed and the abeyance terminated in favour of the fifteenth baron. The twelfth to fourteenth barons never actually held the title. This creation became abeyant again in 1951.

The second creation was in 1324, when Sir Ralph de Cobham was summoned to parliament as Baron Cobham. The history of this creation is unknown following the death of the 2nd baron in or after 1378.

The third creation was in 1326, when Sir Stephen de Cobham of Rundale, in the parish of Shorne in Kent (adjacent to Cobham) was summoned to parliament, again as Baron Cobham. Sir Stephen de Cobham was a cousin of Henry de Cobham, 1st Baron Cobham of Cobham. This creation became abeyant no later than 1429.

The fourth creation was in 1342, when Reginald de Cobham was summoned to parliament. However, this creation became extinct on the death of the second baron in 1403.

The fifth creation was in 1645, when John Brooke was created Baron Cobham, but this title became extinct upon his death in 1660.

There was a sixth creation in 1714, in the Peerage of Great Britain, for Sir Richard Temple, 4th Baronet. Since he had no children, there was a seventh creation for him in 1718, when he was created Baron Cobham again and Viscount Cobham (both titles with a special remainder), and the latter two titles are extant. He was grandson of Sir Peter Temple, 2nd Baronet and his wife Christian, daughter of Sir John Leveson and his wife Frances, daughter of Sir Thomas Sondes and his wife Margaret, daughter of William Brooke, 10th Baron Cobham.

== Barons Cobham (of (Cobham, in) Kent); First Creation (1313) ==
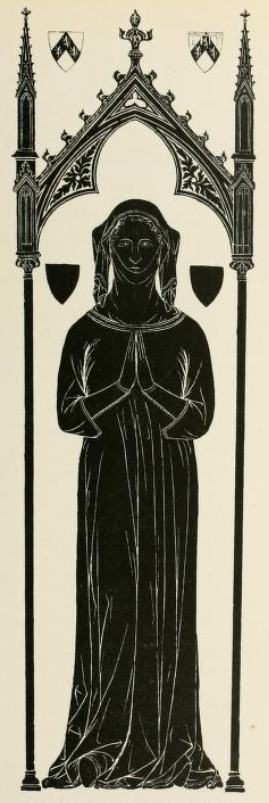
Brass in Cobham Church of Joan Septvans, mother of Henry de Cobham, 1st Baron Cobham

The Cobhams were a family of lawyers who worked as circuit judges on the eyre and in local government in various roles such as Sheriff of Kent and Warden of the Cinque Ports.

John de Cobham (died 1300), of Cobham and of Cooling, Constable of Rochester Castle in Kent and one of the Barons of the Exchequer, who married Joan de Septvans (died 1298), a daughter and co-heiress of Sir Robert de Septvans of Chartham in Kent. A monumental brass, laid down in 1320, survives in St Mary Magdalene's Church, Cobham, of Joan Septvans which displays one of the earliest known specimens of a Gothic canopy. John's younger brother, Sir Henry de Cobham (d. circa 1316), of nearby Randall in the parish of Shorne, was the father of Stephen de Cobham, 1st Baron Cobham of Rundale- a title that was created in 1326.

=== Henry Cobham, 1st Baron Cobham (1260–1339) ===
Henry Cobham, 1st Baron Cobham (1260–1339), son and heir of John de Cobham and Joan de Septvans. He was summoned by writ to Parliament in 1313, when he is deemed to have been created Baron Cobham ("of Kent"). In 1303/4 he was appointed Constable of Rochester Castle for life; in 1314/15 he was Constable of Dover Castle and Warden of the Cinque Ports. He married Maud de Moreville, widow of Matthew de Columbers and a daughter of Eudes de Moreville. He died at his daughter-in-law's home at Hatch Beauchamp in Somerset, the seat of the Beauchamp family's feudal barony of Hatch Beauchamp, and was buried in the Beauchamp Chapel at Stoke-sub-Hamdon, Somerset.

=== John de Cobham, 2nd Baron Cobham (d. 1355) ===
John de Cobham, 2nd Baron Cobham (died 1355), son and heir. Elected six times a Member of Parliament for Kent, served (jointly with his father) as Constable of Rochester Castle. From 1335 he was Admiral of the Fleet from the Thames westward. He married firstly Joan Beauchamp, a daughter of John Beauchamp, 1st Baron Beauchamp (1274–1336) of Hatch Beauchamp in Somerset; and secondly to Agnes Stone, a daughter of Richard Stone of Dartford. He was buried in Cobham Church, where survives his monumental brass, inscribed in rhyming French: "You who pass round this place pray for the soul of the courteous host called John de Cobham May God grant him entire pardon He died the day after the feast of St Mattew and the Almighty took him to himself in the year of grace 1354 and cast down his mortal enemies".

=== John Cobham, 3rd Baron Cobham (d. 1408) ===
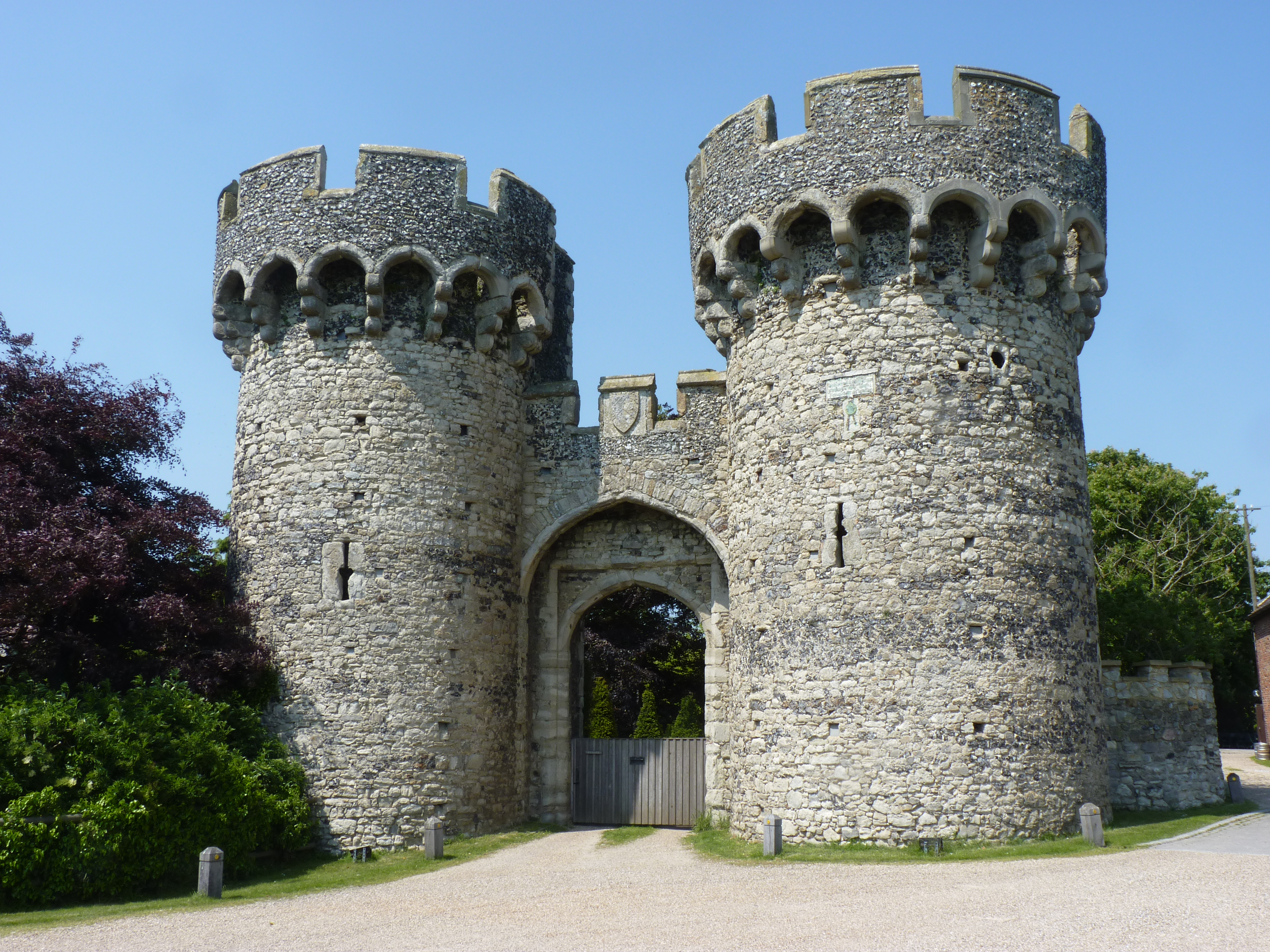
Cooling Castle, Kent, built by John Cobham, 3rd Baron Cobham

John Cobham, 3rd Baron Cobham (died 1408), son and heir by his father's first wife. He built nearby Cooling Castle on his estate at Cooling, Kent, acquired by his ancestors in the mid-13th century. In 1362 he founded Cobham College in the parish church of Cobham, a chantry employing a college of five priests. He married Margaret Courtenay (died 1385), a daughter of Hugh de Courtenay, 2nd/10th Earl of Devon (1303–1377) of Tiverton Castle in Devon. In 1388 he was one of the Lords Appellant who impeached various of the favourites of King Richard II, including de la Pole and de Vere. In 1397/8 he himself was impeached for his role as a Lord Appellant and was sentenced to death but pardoned on condition of his exile to Jersey. Henry IV restored the estates and he returned to England, where he died in 1408, at a great age. He was buried in the Greyfriars, London, but his monumental brass survives in Cobham Church, next to that of his wife, inscribed in French: "From the earth I was made and formed and into earth and to earth am I returned John of Cobham Founder of this place which was previously named. May the Holy Trinity have mercy on my soul". He died without male issue, leaving an only child and (in her issue) sole heiress Joan de Cobham (died 1388), who predeceased her father, wife of Sir John de la Pole of Chrishall in Essex and of Castle Ashby in Northamptonshire, a first cousin of Michael de la Pole, 1st Earl of Suffolk.

=== Joan de la Pole, suo jure 4th Baroness Cobham (d. 1434) ===
Joan de la Pole, suo jure 4th Baroness Cobham (died 1434), granddaughter and heiress of the 3rd Baron (daughter and heiress of Joan Cobham and Sir John de la Pole). She married five times: firstly to Sir Robert Hemenhale (died 1391) of Norfolk, buried in Westminster Abbey; secondly to Sir Reynold Braybroke (died 1405) who died on the Continent and was buried in Cobham Church, where survives his monumental brass; thirdly she married Sir Nicholas Hawberk (died 1407), who was buried in Cobham Church, where survives his monumental brass; fourthly she married Sir John Oldcastle, jure uxoris Baron Cobham, 1st Baron Oldcastle (died 1417), who was hanged as a heretic and traitor. Fifthly she married Sir John Harpeden (died 1458) who survived her by 24 years and was buried in Westminster Abbey, where survives his monumental brass. Joan died in 1434 and was buried in Cobham Church, where survives her monumental brass, commemorating also her second husband Sir Reynold Braybroke, and her 6 sons and 4 daughters, with 6 coats of arms (including one of Brooke). She died without surviving male issue when her heir became her only surviving daughter Joan Braybroke, the wife of Sir Thomas Brooke (died 1439) of Holditch, Devon.

=== Joan Braybroke, suo jure 5th Baroness Cobham (d. 1442) ===
Arms of Brooke, Baron Cobham of Kent

Joan Braybroke, suo jure 5th Baroness Cobham (died 1442), the 4th Baroness's daughter by her second husband Sir Reynold Braybrooke. She married Sir Thomas Brooke (died 1439) of Holditch in the parish of Thorncombe, Devon. The Brooke family (anciently "de la Brook" or "At-Brook") originated at the estate of "la Brook" near Ilchester in Somerset, and later resided at Holditch in the parish of Thorncombe and at Weycroft in the parish of Axminster, both in Devon, both fortified manor houses. Following their inheritance the Brooke family moved to Cobham Hall in Kent.

=== Edward Brooke, 6th Baron Cobham (d. 1464) ===
Edward Brooke, 6th Baron Cobham (died 1464), son of the 5th Baroness by her husband Sir Thomas III Brooke (died 1439) of Holdich, Devon. His grandfather Sir Thomas II Brooke (died 1418) of Holditch (whose monumental brass, together with that of his wife Joan Hanham, survives in Thorncombe Church) was "by far the largest landowner in Somerset" and served 13 times as a Member of Parliament for Somerset. Joan Hanham was the second daughter and co-heiress of Simon Hanham of Gloucestershire, and was the widow of the Bristol cloth merchant Robert Cheddar (died 1384), MP and twice Mayor of Bristol, "whose wealth was proverbial". She held many of Cheddar's estates after his death as her dower and died seized of 20 manors in Somerset and others elsewhere. Her son Richard Cheddar, MP, signed over his large inheritance to his mother and stepfather Sir Thomas II Brooke for their lives, due to the latter having "many times endured great travail and cost" in defending them during his minority. He married Elizabeth Touchet, a daughter of James Touchet, 5th Baron Audley, by his second wife Eleanor, an illegitimate daughter of Edmund Holland, 4th Earl of Kent (1383–1408) by his mistress Constance of York, a daughter of Edmund of Langley, 1st Duke of York (1341–1402), the fourth surviving son of King Edward III.

=== John Brooke, 7th Baron Cobham (d. 1512) ===
John Brooke, 7th Baron Cobham (died 1512) was a minor at the death of his father in 1464 when his wardship was granted to Edward Neville, 3rd Baron Bergavenny (died 1476), of nearby Mereworth Castle, Kent, an uncle of King Edward IV. In 1497 together with Lord Bergavenny he defeated the Cornish Rebellion at Blackheath, where one of its leaders James Tuchet, 7th Baron Audley, his cousin, was taken prisoner. He married twice: firstly to Eleanor Austell of Suffolk, without issue, and secondly to Margaret Nevill (died 1506) (whose monumental brass survives in Cobham Church), a daughter of Edward Neville, his former guardian. In St. James Church, Cooling, survives the brass of his daughter Faith Brooke (d. 21 September 1508), inscribed: "Pray for ye soule of Ffeyth Brooke late ye daught. of Sir John Brooke, Lord of Cobham, which Ffeyth decessed the XXI day of Septeb. ye yer of or. Lord MDVIII on whose soule Jhu have mcy."

=== Thomas Brooke, 8th Baron Cobham (d. 1529) ===
Thomas Brooke, 8th Baron Cobham (died 1529), son and heir by his father's second wife Margaret Nevill. He fought at the Siege of Tournai and at the Battle of the Spurs in 1513 and in 1520 was one of the Kent contingent accompanying King Henry VIII to the Field of Cloth of Gold. In 1521 he was one of the 12 barons who tried the Duke of Buckingham. He married three times: firstly Dorothy Heydon, a daughter of Sir Henry Heydon (died 1504) of Baconsthorpe, Norfolk (by his wife Anne Boleyn, a daughter of Sir Geoffrey Boleyn, great-grandfather of Queen Anne Boleyn), by whom he had 13 children; secondly he married Dorothy Southwell, a widow, without issue; thirdly he married Elizabeth Hart, without issue. He was buried in Cobham Church, where survives his monumental brass.

=== George Brooke, 9th Baron Cobham (1497–1558) ===
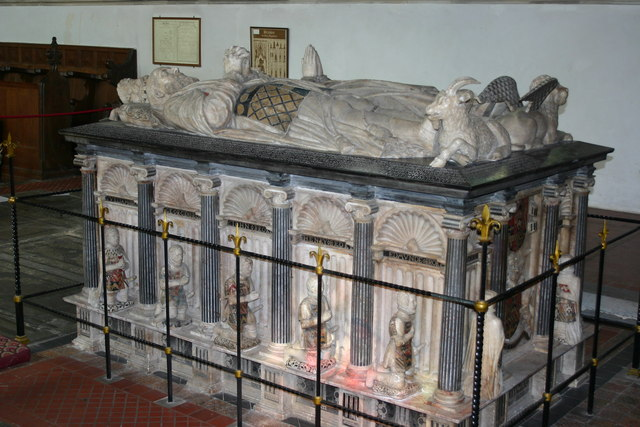
Chest tomb monument and effigies of George Brooke, 9th Baron Cobham, and of his wife Anne Bray, St Mary Magdalene's Church, Cobham. Their 14 children are shown as mourners kneeling on the base

George Brooke, 9th Baron Cobham (1497–1558), KG, eldest surviving son by his father's first wife Dorothy Haydon. In 1536 he was one of the 27 peers who sat in judgement on Anne Boleyn, the second wife of King Henry VIII. He served as Deputy of Calais, a personal possession of the king, under the young King Edward VI, who appointed him a Knight of the Garter in 1549. During the Dissolution of the Monasteries he received large grants of former monastic lands, including of Cobham College founded in the parish church by his ancestor. He was one of the 4 lay peers at the trial of Edward Seymour, 1st Duke of Somerset (died 1552), Lord Protector of England, and was one of 26 peers who signed letters patent settling the crown on Lady Jane Grey, but he later recognised the claim of Queen Mary I. In 1554 he was besieged in Cooling Castle by his nephew Sir Thomas Wyatt during his Wyatt's rebellion against the Catholic Queen Mary's engagement to King Philip II of Spain and in support of placing her sister the Protestant Queen Elizabeth on the throne. Vastly outnumbered Brooke surrendered after eight hours of siege and the bombardment badly damaged the castle. Brooke and his son were briefly imprisoned in the Tower of London on suspicion of having deliberately failed to defend the castle. On 23 November 1555 he entertained at Cooling Castle Cardinal Reginald Pole, recently landed at Dover and on his way, via Canterbury Cathedral and Rochester Castle, with a following of 500 horsemen, to Gravesend and thence by barge to the Palace of Whitehall to meet Queen Mary I and to re-establish the Roman Catholic faith in England. Pole would later be responsible for many Protestant martyrdoms. Brooke's magnificent chest tomb and alabaster effigy, with that of his wife Ann Braye (died 1558), one of the two daughters and co-heiresses of Edmund Braye, 1st Baron Braye, by whom he had 10 sons and 4 daughters, survives in Cobham Church before the high altar.

=== William Brooke, 10th Baron Cobham (1527–1597) ===
William Brooke, 10th Baron Cobham (1527–1597), served as Vice-Admiral of Kent. He built the surviving two brick wings forming the west court, the south wing between 1584 and 1587 and the north begun in 1591. In his will he provided funds for the establishment of 21 almshouses within the abandoned building of Cobham College near the parish church, to house poor and worthy local elderly people. The old buildings were accordingly divided up into 21 separate dwellings, each having one room on the first floor and one on the ground floor, with its own entrance door.

=== Henry Brooke, 11th Baron Cobham (1564–1619) ===
Henry Brooke, 11th Baron Cobham (1564–1619), who married Frances Howard (c. 1572 – 1628), 2nd daughter of Charles Howard, 1st Earl of Nottingham and widow of Henry FitzGerald, Earl of Kildare. He was attainted in 1603, for his part in a plot to overthrow King James I, when the peerage became abeyant instead of becoming extinct. His lands were forfeited to the crown, although in 1604 King James I granted to his wife Frances Howard a lease for her life of Cobham Hall, where she lived "in solitary state" until her death in 1628, having in the meantime taken "no notice whatever of her husband after his trial", who spent the rest of his life in the Tower of London and died in poverty. The king however granted the reversion of the estate to his third cousin Ludovic Stewart, 1st Duke of Richmond, 2nd Duke of Lennox (1574–1624) who was never able to live there as he predeceased Frances Howard. On his death in 1624 the estate was thus inherited by his heir, his nephew James Stewart, 1st Duke of Richmond (died 1655).

=== Later holders ===
- William Brooke (MP, died 1643) (1601–1643) (heir but for the attainder - abeyant on death)
- William Boothby (1721–1787) (became heir to the peerage, but for the attainder, in 1747)
- Mary Disney (1716–1789) (heiress but for the attainder - abeyant on death)
- Gervase Disney Alexander, 15th Baron Cobham (1847–1916) (abeyance and attainder post-mortem terminated by backdated letters patent to 1916) (abeyant on death)
- Robert Disney Leith Alexander, 16th Baron Cobham (1885–1951) (abeyance terminated in 1951, abeyant again on death)

The title thus again fell into abeyancy; the senior co-heir is Simon Rhys Shaw, a writer and great-nephew of the last Baron.

== Barons Cobham; Second Creation (1324) ==
- Ralph Cobham, 1st Baron Cobham (d. 1326)
- John Cobham, 2nd Baron Cobham (1324/1325-aft. 1378) (extinct?)

== Barons Cobham (of Rundale); Third Creation (1326) ==
- Stephen Cobham, 1st Baron Cobham of Rundale (d. 1332); neither of his descendants were summoned to parliament
- John Cobham, 2nd Baron Cobham of Rundale de jure (1319–1362)
- Thomas Cobham, 3rd Baron Cobham of Rundale de jure (1343–1394)
- Reynold Cobham, 4th Baron Cobham of Rundale de jure (d. 1405)
- Thomas Cobham, 5th Baron Cobham of Rundale de jure (d. 1429) (abeyant on death)

== Barons Cobham (of Sterborough); Fourth Creation (1347) ==
- Reynold Cobham, 1st Baron Cobham of Sterborough (c. 1295–1361)
- Reynold Cobham, 2nd Baron Cobham of Sterborough (1348–1403)
- Reynold Cobham, 3rd Baron Cobham of Sterborough de jure (1381-aft. 1446)
- Margaret Cobham, 4th Baroness Cobham of Sterborough de jure (d. 1466–1471)
- Thomas Cobham, 5th Baron Cobham de jure (d. 1471) (abeyant on death)
- Anne Cobham, 6th Baroness of Cobham (d. 1526)

== Barons Cobham; Fifth Creation (1645) ==
- John Brooke, 1st Baron Cobham (1575–1660) (extinct)

== Barons Cobham; Sixth Creation (1714) ==
- Richard Temple, 1st Baron Cobham (1675–1749) (extinct)

== Barons Cobham; Seventh Creation (1718) ==
- Richard Temple, 1st Viscount Cobham (1675–1749)
- see Viscount Cobham

=== Family tree ===
Family tree of the Duke of Buckingham and Chandos, Marquess of Buckingham, Marquess of Chandos, Viscount Cobham, Earl Temple, Earl Temple of Stowe, Baron Cobham, Baron Grenville, Baron Lyttelton, Baron Westcote and Temple baronets

Peter Temple
Anthony Temple | John Temple
Baronet, of Stowe, in the County of Buckingham, 1611
William Temple; 1555–1627 | Thomas Temple; 1567–1637; 1st Baronet, of Stowe | Alexander Temple; 1583–1629
Baronet, of Frankley, in the County of Worcester, 1618
John Temple; 1600–1677 | Peter Temple; 1592–1653; 2nd Baronet, of Stowe | John Temple; 1593–1632 | James Temple; 1606–1680 | Thomas Lyttelton; 1593–1650; 1st Baronet, of Frankley
Baronet, of Stowe, in the County of Buckingham, 1662
Thomas Temple; 1613/14–1674; 1st Baronet, of Stowe | Peter Temple; 1613–1660 | Henry Lyttelton; 1624–1693; 2nd Baronet, of Frankley | Charles Lyttelton; 1628–1716; 3rd Baronet, of Frankley
Baronetcy of Stowe (1662 creation) extinct, 1674
John Temple; 1632–1705 | Richard Temple; 1634–1697; 3rd Baronet, of Stowe | Eleanor Temple d. 1729 m. Richard Grenville | William Temple d. 1706
Viscount Palmerston and Baron Temple, of Mount Temple in the County of Sligo, 1723 | Baron Cobham, of Cobham in the County of Kent (6th creation), 1714; Viscount Cobham and Baron Cobham, of Cobham in the County of Kent (7th creation), 1718 | Earl Temple, 1749
Henry Temple c. 1673–1757; 1st Viscount Palmerston and Baron Temple | Richard Temple; 1675–1749; 1st Viscount Cobham, etc., 4th Baronet, of Stowe | Hester Grenville c. 1690–1752; 1st Countess Temple, 2nd Viscountess Cobham and 2nd Baroness Cobham | Richard Grenville; 1678–1727 | Christian Temple | Thomas Lyttelton; 1686–1751; 4th Baronet, of Frankley | William Temple; 1694–1760; 5th Baronet, of Stowe | Peter Temple d. 1761; 6th Baronet, of Stowe
Barony of Cobham (1714 creation) extinct, 1749
Henry, Lord Temple | Richard Temple; 1731–1786; 7th Baronet, of Stowe
Baron Lyttelton (1st creation), 1756 | Baron Westcote, 1776; Baron Lyttelton (2nd creation), 1794 | Baronetcy of Stowe dormant, 1786
Henry Temple; 1739–1802; 2nd Viscount Palmerston and Baron Temple | Richard Grenville-Temple; 1711–1779; 2nd Earl Temple, 3rd Viscount Cobham, etc. | George Grenville; 1712–1770 | Hester Grenville; 1720–1803; Baroness Chatham m. William Pitt the Elder, Earl of Chatham and Viscount Pitt | George Lyttelton; 1709–1773; 1st Baron Lyttelton, 5th Baronet, of Frankley | William Henry Lyttelton; 1724–1808; 1st Baron Lyttelton
Marquess of Buckingham (2nd creation), 1784 | Baron Grenville, of Wotton under Bernewood in the County of Buckingham, 1790
George Nugent-Temple-Grenville; 1753–1813; 1st Marquess of Buckingham, 3rd Earl Temple, 2nd Earl Nugent, 4th Viscount Cobham, etc. | William Wyndham Grenville; 1759–1834; 1st Baron Grenville | William Pitt the Younger; 1759–1806 | Thomas Lyttelton; 1744–1779; 2nd Baron Lyttelton, 5th Baronet, of Frankley
Barony of Grenville extinct, 1834 | Barony of Lyttelton and Baronetcy of Frankley extinct, 1779
Duke of Buckingham and Chandos, Marquess of Chandos and Earl Temple of Stowe, 1822
Henry John Temple; 1784–1865; 3rd Viscount Palmerston and Baron Temple | Richard Temple-Nugent-Brydges-Chandos-Grenville; 1776–1839; 1st Duke of Buckingham and Chandos, Marquess of Chandos, and Earl Temple of Stowe, 2nd Marquess of Buckingham, 3rd Earl Nugent, 4th Earl Temple, 5th Viscount Cobham, etc. | George Fulke Lyttelton; 1763–1828; 2nd Baron Lyttelton | William Henry Lyttelton; 1782–1837; 3rd Baron Lyttelton
Richard Plantagenet Temple-Nugent-Brydges-Chandos-Grenville; 1797–1861; 2nd Duke of Buckingham and Chandos, Marquess of Chandos, and Earl Temple of Stowe, 3rd Marquess of Buckingham, 4th Earl Nugent, 6th Viscount Cobham, etc.
Richard Plantagenet Campbell Temple-Nugent-Brydges-Chandos-Grenville; 1823–1889; 3rd Duke of Buckingham and Chandos, Marquess of Chandos, and Earl Temple of Stowe, 4th Marquess of Buckingham, 5th Earl Nugent, 6th Earl Temple, 7th Viscount Cobham, etc. | Anna Eliza Mary (Temple-Nugent-Brydges-Chandos-Grenville) Gore-Langton; 1820–1879 | William Henry Powell Gore-Langton; 1824–1873 | George William Lyttelton; 1817–1876; 4th Baron Lyttelton
Dukedom of Buckingham and Chandos, Marquessates of Buckingham and Chandos, and the Earldoms of Temple (1st creation) and of Nugent extinct, 1889
William Stephen Temple-Gore-Langton; 1847–1902; 4th Earl Temple of Stowe | Charles George Lyttelton; 1842–1922; 8th Viscount Cobham, etc.
Algernon William Stephen Temple-Gore-Langton; 1871–1940; 5th Earl Temple of Stowe | Chandos Graham Temple-Gore-Langton; 1873–1921 | Evelyn Arthur Grenville Temple-Gore-Langton; 1884–1972 | John Cavendish Lyttelton; 1881–1949; 9th Viscount Cobham, etc.
Chandos Grenville Temple-Gore-Langton; 1909–1966; 6th Earl Temple of Stowe | Ronald Stephen Brydges Temple-Gore-Langton; 1910–1988; 7th Earl Temple of Stowe | Walter Grenville Algernon Temple-Gore-Langton; 1924–2013; 8th Earl Temple of Stowe | Charles John Lyttelton; 1909–1977; 10th Viscount Cobham, etc.
James Grenville Temple-Gore-Langton b. 1955; 9th Earl Temple of Stowe | John William Leonard Lyttelton; 1943–2006; 11th Viscount Cobham, etc. | Christopher Charles Lyttelton b. 1947; 12th Viscount Cobham, etc.
Rowan Caradoc Temple-Gore-Langton b. 1987 | Oliver Christopher Lyttelton b. 1976
Heir apparent to the Earl Temple of Stowe | Heir apparent to the Viscount Cobham

== Arms ==
The arms of Cobham of Cobham and Cooling, both in Kent, Barons Cobham "of Kent" are Gules, on a chevron or three lions rampant sable.

The arms of Brooke, Baron Cobham "of Kent" are Gules, on a chevron argent a lion rampant sable crowned or.
