= John Poulett, 1st Baron Poulett =

English sailor and politician

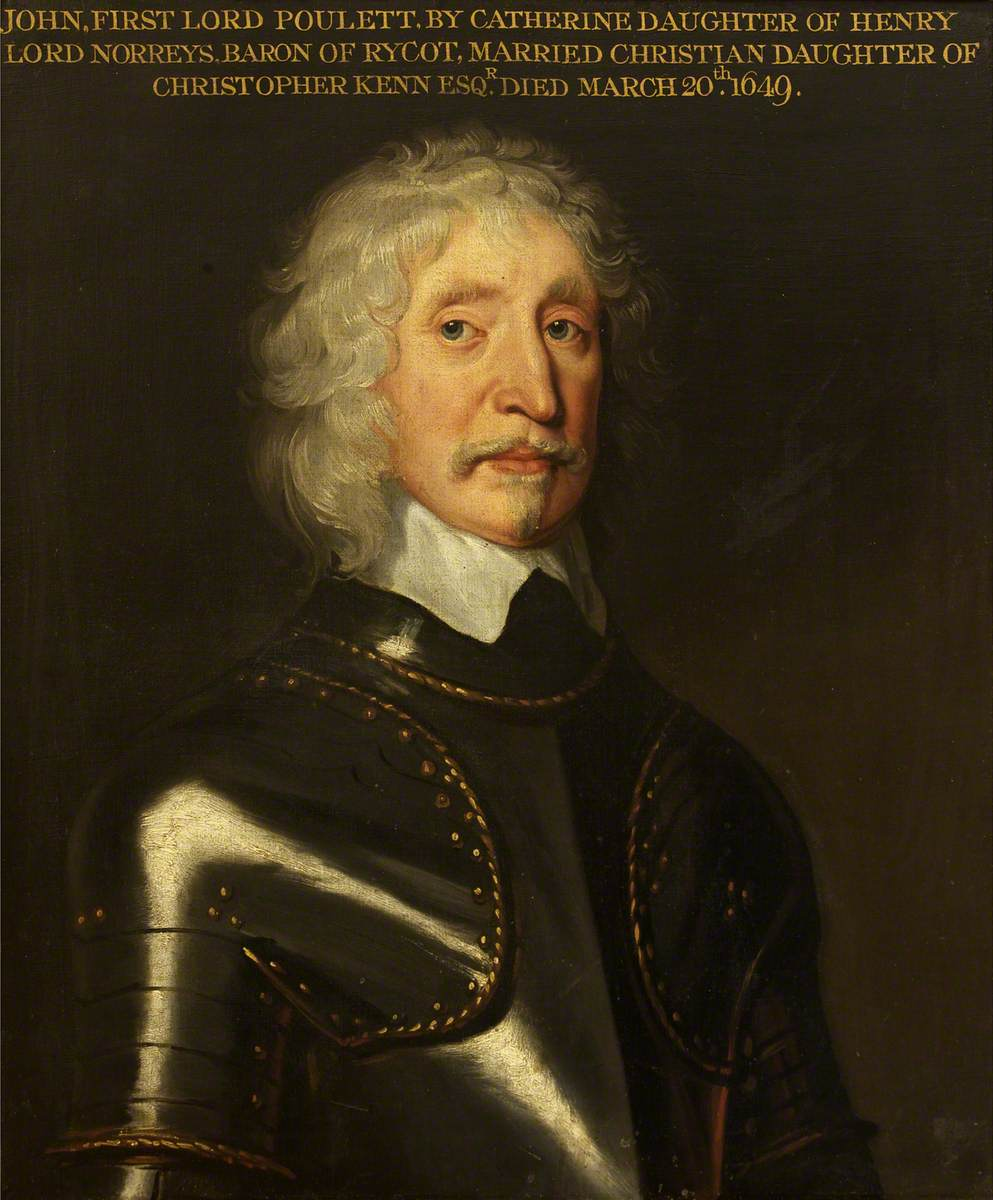
John, First Lord Poulett, painting by anonymous artist (British School), c.1640.

John Poulett, 1st Baron Poulett (1585 – 20 March 1649), of Hinton St George, Somerset, was an English sailor and politician who sat in the House of Commons between 1610 and 1621 and was later raised to the peerage.

== Origins ==
Poulett was the son of Sir Anthony Poulett (1562–1600) (also spelt Paulet), of Hinton St George, Governor of Jersey, and Captain of the Guard to Queen Elizabeth by his wife Catherine Norris, daughter of Henry Norris, 1st Baron Norreys (1525–1601) of Rycote in Oxfordshire.

== Career ==
He was educated at University College, Oxford and was admitted as a student of the Middle Temple in 1610. He was a Justice of the Peace for Somerset by 1613 to at least 1640 and was appointed Sheriff of Somerset for 1616–17. He was elected as Member of Parliament for Somerset in 1610 and 1614, and for Lyme Regis in 1621.

Poulett was raised to the peerage as Baron Poulett, of Hinton St George in the County of Somerset, on 23 June 1627. He served in the Royal Navy to secure English commerce and bullion ships from Dutch raiding expeditions. At the start of the Civil War he put his signature, together with those of other Lords and Councillors, to a declaration disavowing any intention by King Charles I to wage war against the Parliament, but as hostilities broke out he sided, on 15 June 1642, with the Royalist cause. At the time he commanded 800 men of the Somerset Trained Bands, but the men followed Lt-Col John Pyne, MP, into the Parliamentarian army. He was one of the principal commanders at the Siege of Lyme Regis in Dorset. At war's end, Parliament gave him a pardon, but his house was constrained to settle a large sum in reparations.

He died on 20 March 1649.

== Marriage and children ==
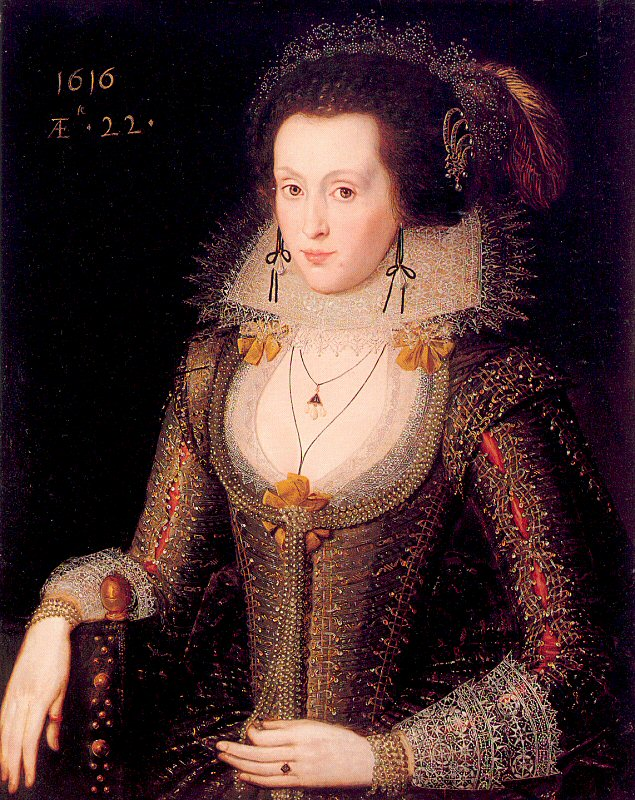
Elizabeth Poulet, 1616, by Robert Peake the Elder, Denver Art Museum

Arms of Paulet/Poulett: Sable, three swords pilewise points in base proper pomels and hilts or

Poulett married Elizabeth Kenn of Kenn Court in Somerset, daughter of Florence Stallinge. They had the following children:

- John Poulett, 2nd Baron Poulett
- Florence Poulett, married
  - first Thomas Smith of Long Ashton; their son was Sir Hugh Smith, 1st Baronet.
  - second Thomas Pigott of Long Ashton; their son was John Pigott, MP for Somerset
- Susan Poulett, married Michael Warton of Beverly Park, Esq., son of Michael Warton and Catherine Maltby (matrineal descendant of Anne of York, Duchess of Exeter)
- Margaret Poulett, married Denys Rolle (1614–1638) of Stevenstone and Bicton in Devon, Sheriff of Devon in 1636.
- Daughter, married Col. Richard Cholmondeley (1620–1644), of Grosmont, county York, Knight, a Royalist commander during the Civil War, and Governor of Axminster, who was killed at the Siege of Lyme Regis in Dorset in October 1644 and was buried at Brixton, Devon.

== Notes ==
Parliament of England
Preceded by Sir Maurice Berkeley; Sir Francis Hastings	Member of Parliament for Somerset; 1610–1614; With: Sir Maurice Berkeley	Succeeded by Sir Maurice Berkeley; Robert Hopton
Preceded by Sir Edward Seymour, Bt; George Browne	Member of Parliament for Lyme Regis; 1621–1622; With: Robert Hassard	Succeeded by Sir John Drake; William Wynn
Peerage of England
New creation	Baron Poulett; 1627–1649	Succeeded by John Poulett
