= Leonard Hakluyt =

English politician (c. 1352 – 1413)

Sir Leonard Hakluyt (c. 1352 – August 1413) was an English politician. He sat as MP for Herefordshire in 1385, February 1388, 1394 and as MP for Somerset in October 1404 and 1406.

He also served as justice of the peace in Herefordshire from July 1389 to June 1394 and May 1401 to February 1407, escheator of Herefordshire and adjacent march from 8 November 1401 to 14 February 1402, sheriff of Herefordshire from 14 February to 29 November 1402 and 15 November 1408 to 5 February 1409 and as tax collector for Herefordshire in March 1404.

He was the son of Sir Edmund Hakluyt and Emma, the widow of John Berenger. By 1394, he married Margaret Longeland (c.1362–1414), the widow of John Deviock, and the daughter/heiress of Sir John Longeland. He had been knighted by 1389. He died in August 1413, without an heir.
