= John Poulett, 3rd Baron Poulett =

English peer

Arms of Poulett: Sable, three swords pilewise points in base proper pomels and hilts or

John Poulett, 3rd Baron Poulett (c. 1641 – June 1679), was an English peer.

Poulett was the son of John Poulett, 2nd Baron Poulett, by Catharine Vere, daughter of Horace Vere, 1st Baron Vere of Tilbury. He sat as a Knight of the Shire for Somerset between 1662 and 1665, when he entered the House of Lords on the death of his father. In 1674, he was appointed Lord Lieutenant of Dorset, which he remained until his death.

Lord Poulett married, firstly in 1663, Essex Popham, eldest daughter of Alexander Popham of Littlecote, Wiltshire by whom he had two daughters. One of the daughter, Margaret, married Francis Fulford. Poulett married, secondly 1667, Lady Susan Herbert, daughter of Philip Herbert, 5th Earl of Pembroke. He died in June 1679 and was succeeded in the barony by the son of his second marriage, John, who was created Earl Poulett in 1706.

Parliament of England
Preceded by Sir John Stawell; Edward Phelips	Member of Parliament for Somerset; 1662–1665; With: Edward Phelips	Succeeded by Edward Phelips; Sir John Warre
Honorary titles
Preceded by The Earl of Shaftesbury	Lord Lieutenant of Dorset; 1674–1679	Succeeded by The Earl of Bristol
Peerage of England
Preceded by John Poulett	Baron Poulett; 1665–1679	Succeeded by John Poulett
