= Neroche Forest =

Former royal forest in Somerset, England

Neroche Forest was a Royal forest in the county of Somerset, England, to the south of Taunton, comprising some 6000–7000 acres.

By the time of Richard II (~1377), the forest had been neglected by the Crown. In 1508, Henry VII leased Exmoor and Neroche forests to Sir Edmund Carew. In 1627, the forest, along with Selwood Forest, was disafforested by Charles I, with the intention that the land be improved for agriculture. This was done to raise funds to pay for the ill-fated Siege of Saint-Martin-de-Ré. By the 1650s, the agricultural value of the lands had shown much improvement. In 1830, a bill went through Parliament for inclosing the Forest of Roach otherwise. This encompassed 2,357 acres that were allotted to landowners in the parishes of Broadway, Bickenhall, Beercrocombe, Ilton, Barrington, Ashill, Illminster, Whitelackington, Curland, Donyatt, Isle-Abbotts, Hatchbeauchamp, and the tithing of Domett in the parish of Buckland Saint Mary.

The spelling of the name has had many variations of Neroche and Rache, with 37 variants recorded.

More recently, the name has been used by the Neroche Landscape Partnership Scheme, who from 2006 to 2011, worked to improve wildlife conservation, access and recreation in an area of 35 square miles. In 2024, the Wild Neroche scheme was started by Forestry England to rewild 730 hectares.

== People associated with the forest ==
- William du Plessis, hereditary keeper or master forester, mid 13th century.
- Sabine Pecche (descendant of William du Plessis), hereditary keeper or master forester, 1300.
- Sir Thomas Brooke, granted six bucks and six does a year for life from the royal forest of Neroche, 1405.
- William de Botreaux, 3rd Baron Botreaux, appointed forester, 1435.
