= George Horner (died 1707) =

English politician

Arms of Horner: Sable, three talbots passant argent. Statues of talbot hounds appear as decorative features at Mells Manor, and on the sign of the Talbot Inn, Mells

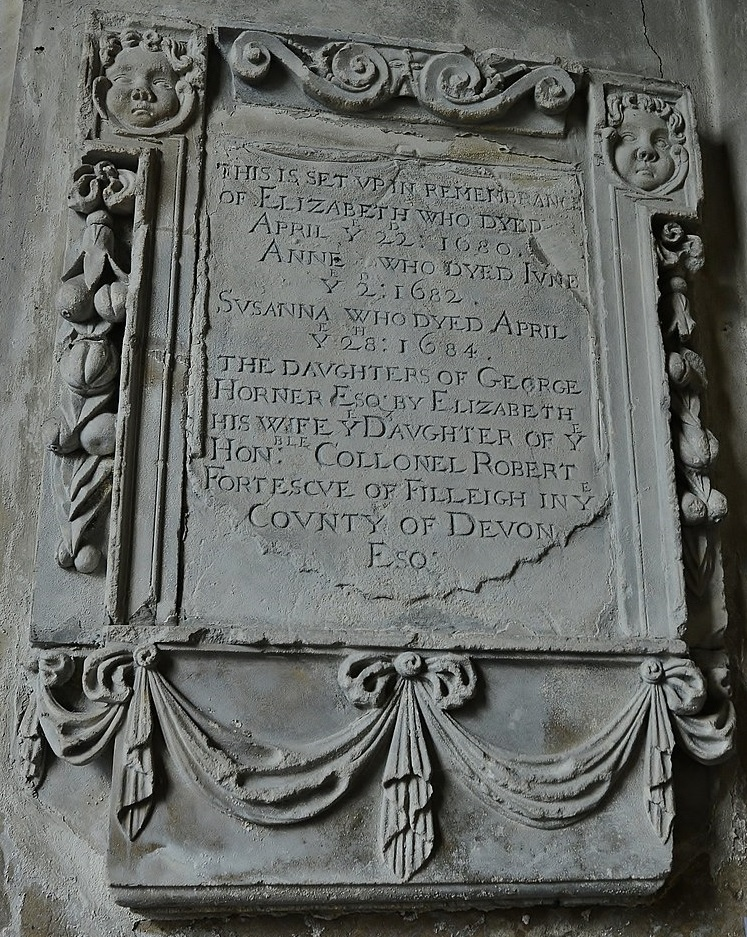
Mural monument in St Andrews Church, Mells, Somerset, to three daughters of George Horner by his wife Elizabeth Fortescue

George Horner (1646 – 11 March 1707) of Mells Manor in Somerset, was an English politician who sat in the House of Commons between 1685 and 1689.

== Origins ==
He was the eldest surviving son of Sir George Horner of Mells, Somerset by his wife Anne Poole, a daughter of Sir Neville Poole.

== Career ==
He entered Lincoln's Inn in 1663. He was commissioner for assessment for Somerset from 1673 to 1680 and a justice of the peace from 1675 until his death, with a brief interruption in 1688. In 1677 he inherited the family estate from his father, and by 1679 was a lieutenant-colonel of the militia. He was High Sheriff of Somerset from 1680 to 1681 and deputy lieutenant from 1680 to 1687. He was a colonel of the militia by 1681.

In 1685, Horner was elected member of parliament for Somerset but made no entry in the records. In 1688 he was deprived of many of his offices for refusing to consent to the repeal of the Test Act. He was re-elected MP for Somerset in 1689. He was commissioner for assessment for Somerset from 1689 to 1690 and restored as Deputy Lieutenant as well JP from 1689 to his death.

== Marriage and children ==
Arms of Fortescue: Azure, a bend engrailed argent plain cotised or

He married Elizabeth Fortescue (1658-5 September 1693), a daughter and co-heiress of Col. Robert Fortescue (1617-1676/7) by his second wife Susanna Northcote, a daughter of Sir John Northcote, 1st Baronet (1599–1676). He was the second son of Hugh Fortescue (1592/3-1663) of Filleigh in Devon (ancestor of Earl Fortescue and Earl Clinton), by his wife Mary Rolle, a daughter of Robert Rolle (died 1633) of Heanton Satchville, Petrockstowe, Devon. By Elizabeth Fortescue he had three sons and four daughters, including:

- Thomas Horner (1688–1741), a Tory Member of Parliament for Somerset in 1713 and 1727, who following his marriage to the heiress Susanna Strangways and in accordance with the terms of the inheritance, in 1726 adopted the surname and arms of Strangways in lieu of his patronymic. Their only child and sole heiress Elizabeth Strangways (born 1722) married Stephen Fox-Strangways, 1st Earl of Ilchester (1704–1776), who also adopted the surname and arms of Strangways.

== Death ==
Horner died at the age of 60 and was buried at Mells.
