= Reginald Alexander =

Reginald Gervase Alexander FLS (20 February 1847 – 14 February 1916) was a British medical doctor and authority on tuberculosis. After his death, he was recognized as the 15th Baron Cobham.

== Origins ==
Reginald Gervase Alexander was the son of Dr. William Alexander of Blackwall Lodge, Halifax, West Yorkshire, Yorkshire (3 September 1806 – 13 April 1888), Fellow of the Royal College of Physicians of London and Justice of the Peace for the West Riding of Yorkshire, and his wife (married 4 October 1837) Emily Kirby (died 26 April 1862), daughter of Samuel Kirby of Grove House, Sheffield, West Riding of Yorkshire. He had an older brother, Arthur William Alexander (2 August 1843 – 15 February 1895), who died unmarried and without issue. His uncle Gervase Alexander (30 September 1802 – 23 September 1871) married his aunt Eliza Kirby on 16 October 1838, while his aunt Ellen Alexander (10 December 1803 – 27 September 1854) married John Clarke Prescott (died 16 May 1863) on 20 February 1839.

== Life ==
In February 1857, he was admitted to Heath Grammar School, Halifax. In 1867, he was admitted to St John's College, Cambridge. He graduated from the University of Cambridge, with a Master of Arts degree and from the University of Edinburgh, as a Doctor of Medicine, and became a Fellow of the Linnean Society of London.

The Committee for Privileges and Conduct of the House of Lords declared on 22 July 1912 that he was one of the co-heirs of the titles of Baron Burgh and Baron Cobham (of (Cobham, in) Kent) (except for the attainder), and on 11 May 1914 that he was one of the co-heirs of the title of Baron Strabolgi. He never had, however, the chance of succeeding in any of these titles, nominately to the Barony Cobham, since the attainder that had fallen on Henry Brooke, 11th Baron Cobham, in 1603, though finally removed in September 1916, was only lifted after his own death.

== Marriage and issue ==
He married on 29 May 1879 Alicia Mary Greenwood (died 30 December 1913), daughter of John Greenwood of Castle Hall, Mytholmroyd, Calderdale, West Yorkshire, and had four children:

- Gervase Disney Alexander, 15th Baron Cobham (of Kent) (6 May 1880 – 10 June 1933)
- Hon. Mary Isabel Alexander (born 11 June 1882), who married twice, firstly on 27 April 1916 to John Leslie Morton Shaw (died 18 December 1925), son of John Edward Shaw, and secondly on 21 May 1927 John Bazley-White (died while on active service during World War II circa November 1940), son of John Bazley-White, without any issue from both marriages, and was granted the rank of a baron's daughter on 9 May 1917
- Robert Disney Leith Alexander, 16th Baron Cobham (of Kent) (23 April 1885 – 21 February 1951)
- Hon. Muriel Helen Alexander (born 15 March 1887), married on 4 March 1916 to John Edmund Burnett Thornely, son of Thomas Thornely, from Cambridge, and was granted the rank of a baron's daughter on 9 May 1917. Their two sons became the heirs in abeyance of their maternal uncle the 16th Baron:
  - Gervase Michael Cobham Thornely (born 1918 Hampstead, County of London), married on 5 April 1954 in Kensington, County of London to Jennifer Margary Scott, daughter of Sir Charles Hilary Scott (27 March 1906 – 9 April 1991) and Beatrice Margery Garrad ((6 June 1907 – 1998) – daughter of Reverend Canon Robert Garrad (1874 – 6 Nov 1947) and Florence Beatrice Hoyle (1880 – 27 January 1961)). They raised four children – two sons and two daughters.
  - John Alexander Cobham Thornely (1921 Hampstead, County of London – 31 January 1966 Hove, East Sussex), unmarried and without issue.
