= Edward Rogers (comptroller) =

English gentleman who served as an Officer of State in various capacities

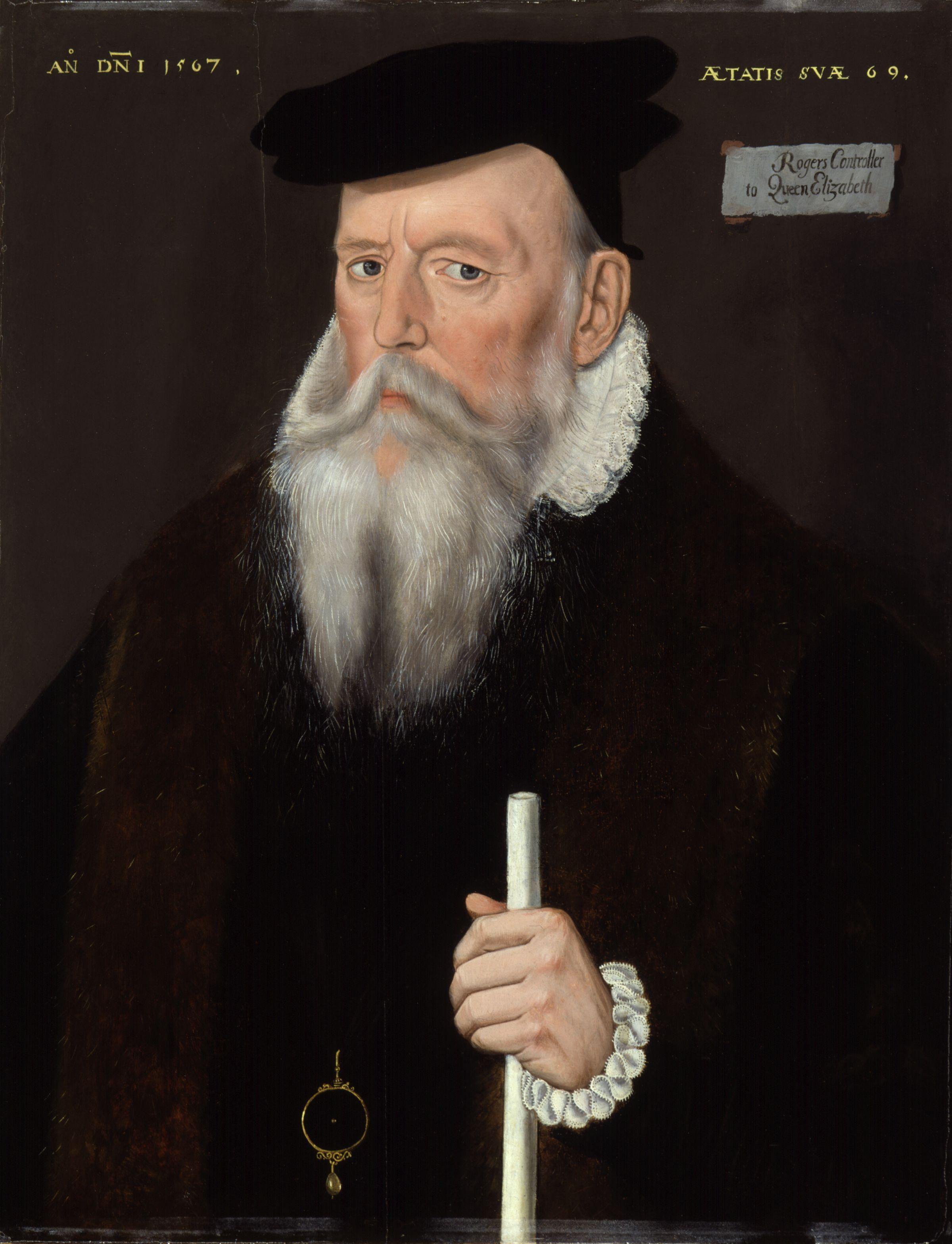
Portrait of Sir Edward Rogers aged 69, holding his white staff, the mark of his office. National Portrait Gallery, London.

Sir Edward Rogers (c. 1498 – 3 May 1568) was an English gentleman who served as an Officer of State in various capacities during the Tudor period. He rose to become Comptroller and Vice-Chamberlain of the Household to Elizabeth I from 1560 to 1568.

== Life ==
Edward Rogers was born in about 1498, the son of George Rogers of Langport (d. 1524) and his wife Elizabeth. Before 1528, he married Mary Lisle, daughter and co-heiress of Sir John Lisle of the Isle of Wight. They had three daughters and a son:

- George, his father's heir and executor (d. 1582)
- Jane, married Thomas Throckmorton
- Anne, married Thomas Harmon
- Mary, married John Chettel

== Royal service ==
Rogers was made Esquire of the Body to Henry VIII before 1534. At the Dissolution of the Monasteries, he was granted the former nunnery at Cannington in Somerset, which became the family seat. He was a Justice of the Peace for Dorset and Somerset and was elected a Member of Parliament for Tavistock in 1547, the year of Henry VIII's death.

Rogers had quarreled with the powerful Seymour family, but at the fall of the Lord Protector in 1549 he once again advanced at court. He was knighted at the coronation of Edward VI in 1549 and served Edward as one of his four principal gentlemen of the privy chamber. As a member of Edward's council he witnessed the will appointing Lady Jane Grey as Edward's heir to the throne of England.

He was knight of the shire for Somerset throughout most of Queen Mary I's reign (1553, 1558, 1559 and 1563). A staunch Protestant, Rogers opposed Mary's restoration of Catholicism, and was imprisoned in the Tower of London in 1554. He was released in January 1555 and pardoned in July on payment of £1,000 to keep the peace.

On her accession in 1558, Queen Elizabeth appointed him Vice-Chamberlain, Captain of the Guard, and Privy Councillor on the recommendation of his old friend Sir Nicholas Throckmorton. He was appointed to succeed Sir Thomas Parry as Comptroller when Parry was named Lord Treasurer in 1560. Rogers held the office of Comptroller until his death in 1568.

Rogers' granddaughter, Mary Rogers, married Queen Elizabeth I's godson Sir John Harington on 6 September 1583.

== Notes ==
Political offices
Preceded by Sir Henry Bedingfeld	Vice-Chamberlain of the Household; 1558–1559	Succeeded by Sir Francis Knollys
Preceded by Sir Thomas Parry	Comptroller of the Household; 1560–1568	Vacant Title next held by Sir James Croft
