= John Harrington (Parliamentarian) =

English politician

John Harington (1627–1700) was an English politician who sat in the House of Commons from 1654. He fought in the Parliamentary army in the English Civil War.

Harrington was the son of John Harrington of Kelston, Somerset and was baptised at Kelston on 19 May 1627. He matriculated at Lincoln College, Oxford on 21 February 1640, aged 13. In the Civil War he was a captain of a Somerset troop of horse in the Parliamentary army. He was of Corston, and later of Kelston. His father died in 1654. In 1654, he was elected Member of Parliament for Somerset in the First Protectorate Parliament. He was re-elected MP for Somerset in 1656 for the Second Protectorate Parliament. In 1659 he was elected MP for Bath for the Third Protectorate Parliament.

Harrington died at the age of 73 at Bath and was buried there on 16 April 1700.

Parliament of England
Preceded by General-at-sea Robert Blake; John Pine; Dennis Hollister; Henry Henley	Member of Parliament for Somerset; 1654; With: Sir John Horner 1654; John Preston 1654; Charles Steynings 1654; Richard Jones 1654; Thomas Hippisley 1654; Samuel Perry 1654; John Buckland 1654–1656; General John Desborough 1654–1656; John Ashe 1654–1656; Robert Long 1654–1656; Alexander Popham 1656; Colonel John Gorges 1656; Francis Luttrell 1656; Sir Lislebone Long 1656; William Wyndham 1656; Francis Rolle 1656	Succeeded by John Buckland; Robert Hunt
Preceded by James Ashe	Member of Parliament for Bath; 1659; With: James Ashe	Succeeded by James Ashe
