= Holdich =

Holdich is a surname. Notable people with the surname include:

- George Holdich (1816–1896), British organist and organ builder
- Thomas Holdich (1843–1929), British geographer
