= John Poulett, 2nd Baron Poulett =

English peer and Member of Parliament

John Poulett
- Baron Poulett
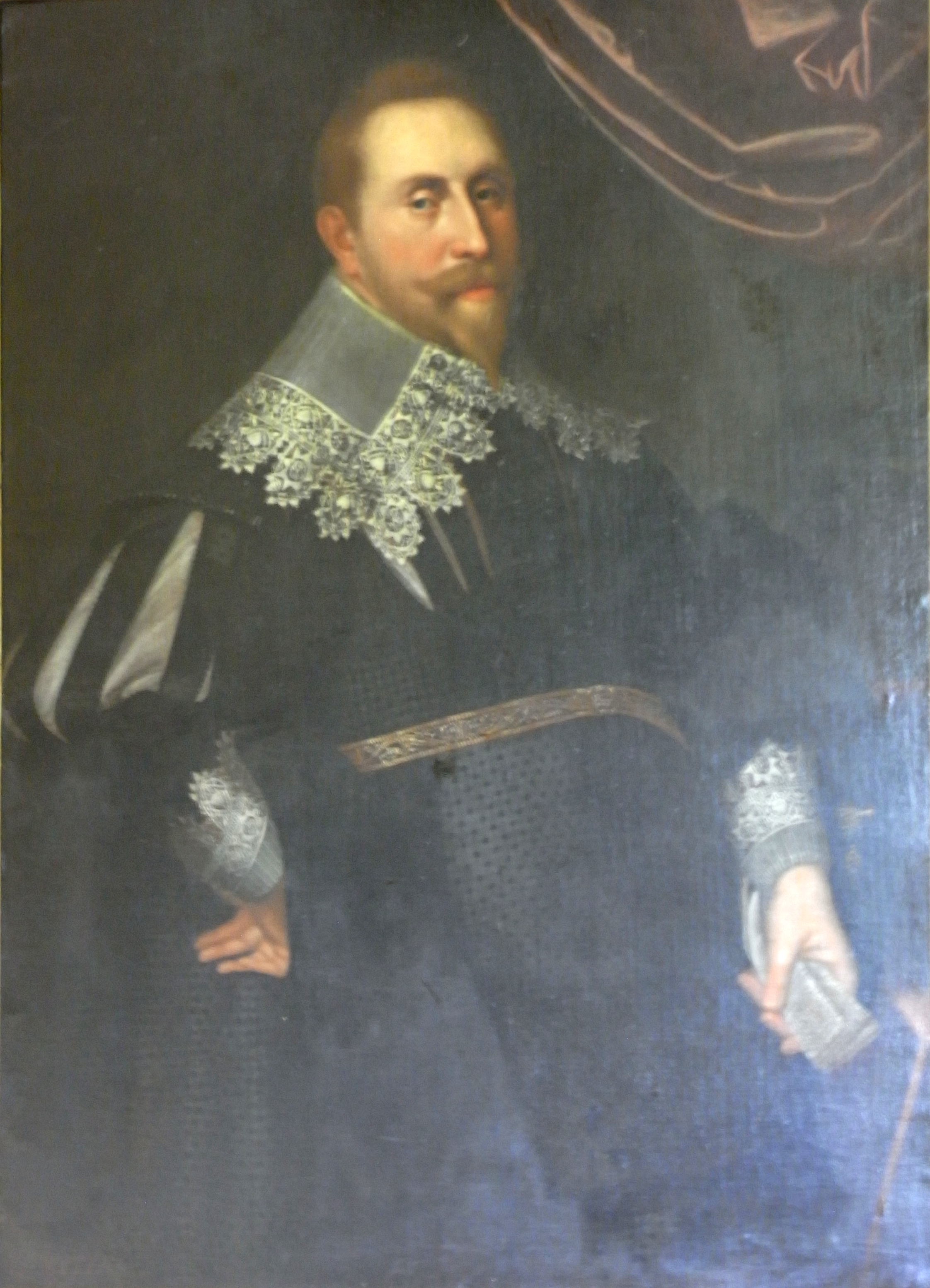
- Portrait of John Poulett, 2nd Baron Poulett (1615-1665)
- Predecessor: John Poulett, 1st Baron Poulett
- Successor: John Poulett, 3rd Baron Poulett
- Born: 1615
- Died: 15 September 1665 (aged 49–50); Court de Wick, Yatton, Somerset
- Buried: 24 October; Hinton St George
- Spouses: Catherine Vere; Anne Browne
- Father: John Poulett, 1st Baron Poulett
- Mother: Elizabeth Kenn

John Poulett, 2nd Baron Poulett DL (1615 – 15 September 1665), of Hinton St George in Somerset, was an English peer and Member of Parliament who fought on the Royalist side during the English Civil War.

The son of John Poulett, 1st Baron Poulett (1585–1649), he was knighted in 1635 and elected to the Long Parliament as Member for Somerset in 1640, but was ejected for his Royalist sympathies in 1642. In 1643 he was awarded the degree of Doctor of Medicine at Exeter College, Oxford. During the war he first commanded a regiment in Munster, but after peace was temporarily concluded in Ireland brought his troops to England, where they formed part of the garrison of Winchester Castle until it surrendered. His first marriage was to Catherine, daughter of Lord Vere and widow of Oliver St John, which proved fortunate as her sister was married to the Parliamentary leader Lord Fairfax: at the end of the war Poulett was fined £9,400 for his activities, but he was discharged having paid only £1,800 "out of respect to the Lord General".

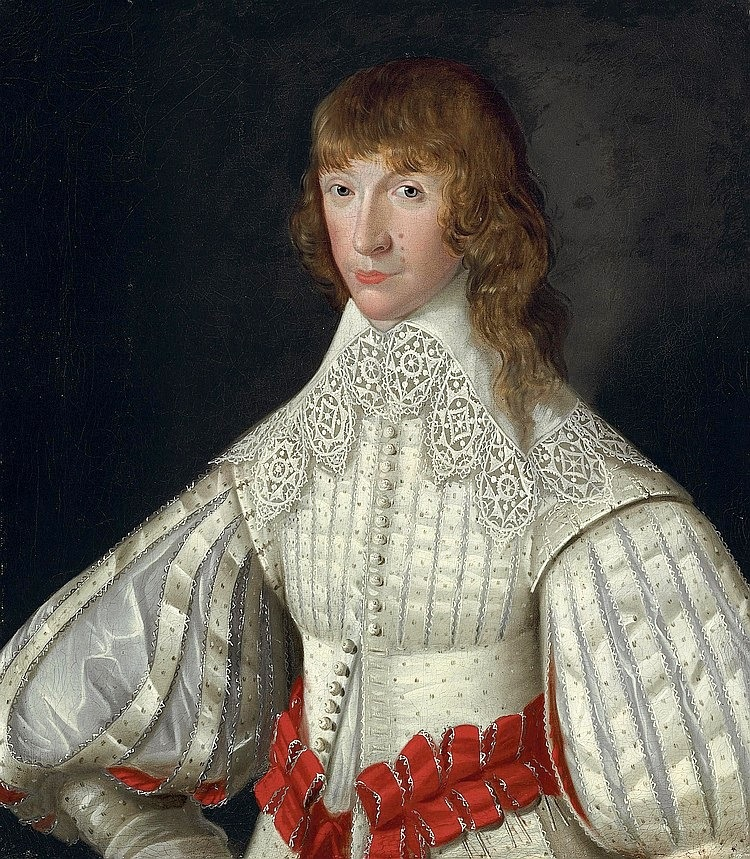
John Poulett, later 2nd Baron Poulett, as a young man

Arms of Poulett: Sable, three swords pilewise points in base proper pomels and hilts or

Sir John succeeded his father in the peerage in 1649. He went into exile abroad in 1658, but returned after the Restoration.

== Notes ==
Parliament of England
Preceded by Sir Ralph Hopton; Thomas Smith	Member of Parliament for Somerset; 1640–1642; With: Sir John Stawell	Succeeded by George Horner; John Harrington
Peerage of England
Preceded by John Poulett	Baron Poulett; 1649–1665	Succeeded by John Poulett
