= Cobham College =

Coordinates: 51.3890°N 0.3987°E

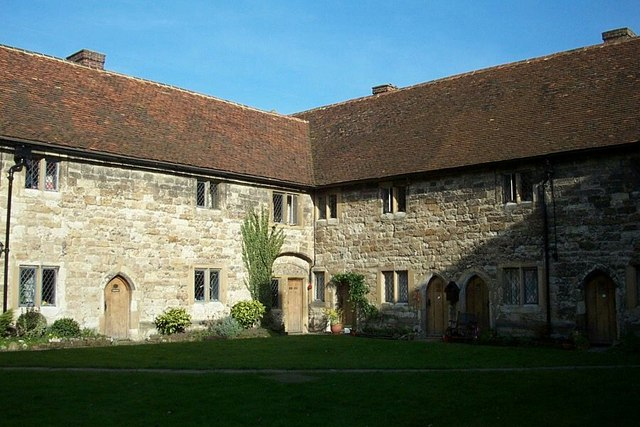
Cobham College in 2003

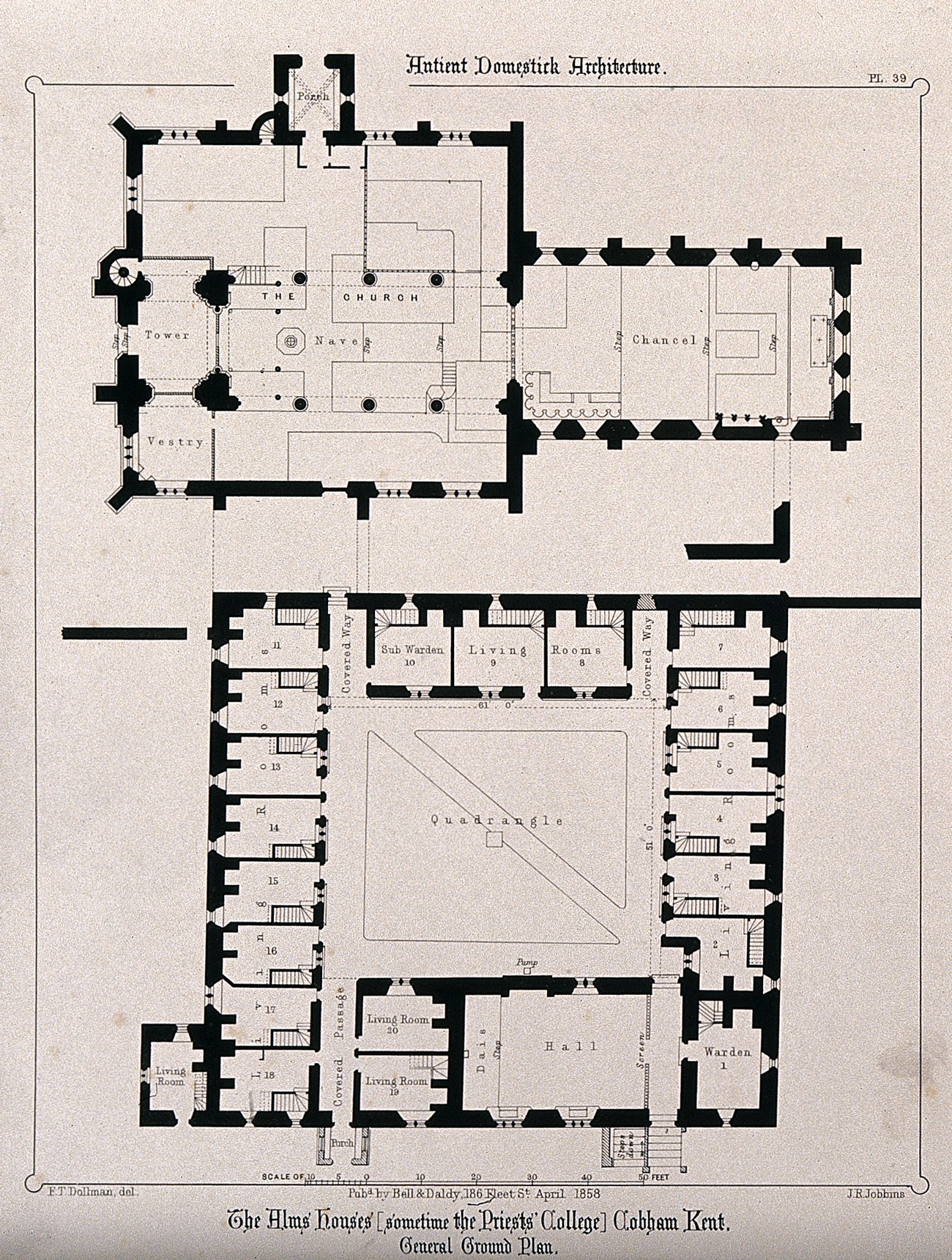
"The Alms houses (formerly Priests' College), Cobham, Kent: floor plans". Transfer lithograph by J.R. Jobbins, 1858, after F.T. Dollman

Cobham College in the village of Cobham in Kent, England, was a chantry employing a college of five priests founded by in 1362 by John Cobham, 3rd Baron Cobham (d. 1408), of nearby Cobham Hall, lord of the manor of Cobham, for the purpose of praying for the speedy passage of his soul (and those of named others) through Purgatory and into Heaven.

The priests were housed in the surviving building known today as "Cobham College", now a grade I listed building. It is situated to the immediate south of the parish church of St Mary Magdalene, to the chancel of which it was originally joined by an open processional passageway. In addition to living quarters for the 5 priests, the building contained a communal great hall with central open hearth.

== History ==
Cobham College was founded in 1362 by Sir John de Cobham, a local nobleman, as a college of priests to pray for the souls of himself and his family. The college originally functioned as a chantry, where priests performed daily prayers and masses for the deceased members of the Cobham family, following the medieval tradition of establishing religious foundations to secure spiritual benefits.

During the Dissolution of the Monasteries under King Henry VIII in the 1530s, many chantries and religious foundations were disbanded. Cobham College survived this period largely intact, although its original religious function was gradually reduced.

In 1597–1598, William Brooke, 10th Baron Cobham, converted the college buildings into almshouses to provide housing for elderly men and women of the parish. This conversion was formalized through charitable provisions and an Act of Parliament, ensuring that the building continued to serve the local community.

Today, Cobham College continues to function as charitable housing, managed by the New College of Cobham charity. The complex provides accommodation for Anglican residents of the parish, maintaining its historical connection to the local community.

== Dissolution ==
Cobham College Act 1597
- Act of Parliament
- Parliament of England
- Long title: An Acte for the establishment of the new Colledge of the Poore at Cobham in the Countie of Kente.
- Citation: 39 Eliz. 1. c. 4 Pr.
- Territorial extent: England and Wales

Dates
- Royal assent: 9 February 1598
- Commencement: 24 October 1597 (Note: Start of session.)

Status: Current legislation

At the Dissolution of the Monasteries, unlike innumerable other chantries in England which were dissolved by Henry VIII in 1539–40, with their possessions and landholdings being sold-off under the supervision of the Court of Augmentations, the master and brethren of Cobham College surrendered it privately to its patron, George Brooke, 9th Baron Cobham (1497–1558), of Cobham Hall and of nearby Cooling Castle, whose possession was secured by act of Parliament, the Cobham College Act 1597 (39 Eliz. 1. c. 4).

== Conversion to almshouses ==
The building formerly housing the chantry priests remained uninhabited until 1597, when William Brooke, 10th Baron Cobham (1527–1597), son of the 9th Baron, in his will provided funds for the establishment of 21 almshouses within the abandoned building, to house poor and worthy local elderly people. The old buildings were accordingly divided up into 21 separate dwellings, each having one room on the first floor and one on the ground floor, with its own entrance door. A brass plate above each of the entrance doors names the parish electing the occupying pensioner within.

== Modernisation ==
In 1981 the interior of the college was consolidated to form 13 self-contained dwellings, still in use for charitable purposes. Today the building is managed as a charity operated by "The New College of Cobham", offering 29 low-rent 1-bedroom dwellings, with resident management staff and lounge, laundry-room, guest facilities and garden. Qualifying residents must be of the Anglican faith (members of the Church of England) and formerly resident in one of the following nearby parishes: Chalk, Cliffe, Cobham, Cooling, Cuxton, Gravesend, Halling, Higham, Hoo, St Mary Hoo, Shorne and Strood.
