= Joan Brooke, 5th Baroness Cobham =

English aristocrat

Joan Brooke (née Braybroke), suo jure 5th Baroness Cobham of Kent (d. 25 November 1442), was an English aristocrat.

== Life ==
Her parents were Sir Reginald (or Reynold) Braybroke and Joan de la Pole, 4th Baroness Cobham (later Oldcastle or Oldcastell). She succeeded to her mother's title on 13 January 1433 or 1434.

She married, c. 20 February in 1409 or 1410, Sir Thomas Brooke of Holdich, Thorncombe, Devon, and of Brooke, Somerset (c. 1391 - c. 1439, bur. Thorncombe, Devon), a Knight (bet. 1416–1421) and a Member of Parliament for Somerset in 1417, between 1421 and 1422 and in 1427, and had at least two children, Edward Brooke, 6th Baron Cobham and Reginald Brooke of Aspall, Suffolk, an ancestor of the Brookes of Ufford, Suffolk.

Peerage of England
Preceded by Joan de la Pole	Baron Cobham; 1433/1434–1442	Succeeded by Edward Brooke
