= George Horner (died 1677) =

English lawyer and politician

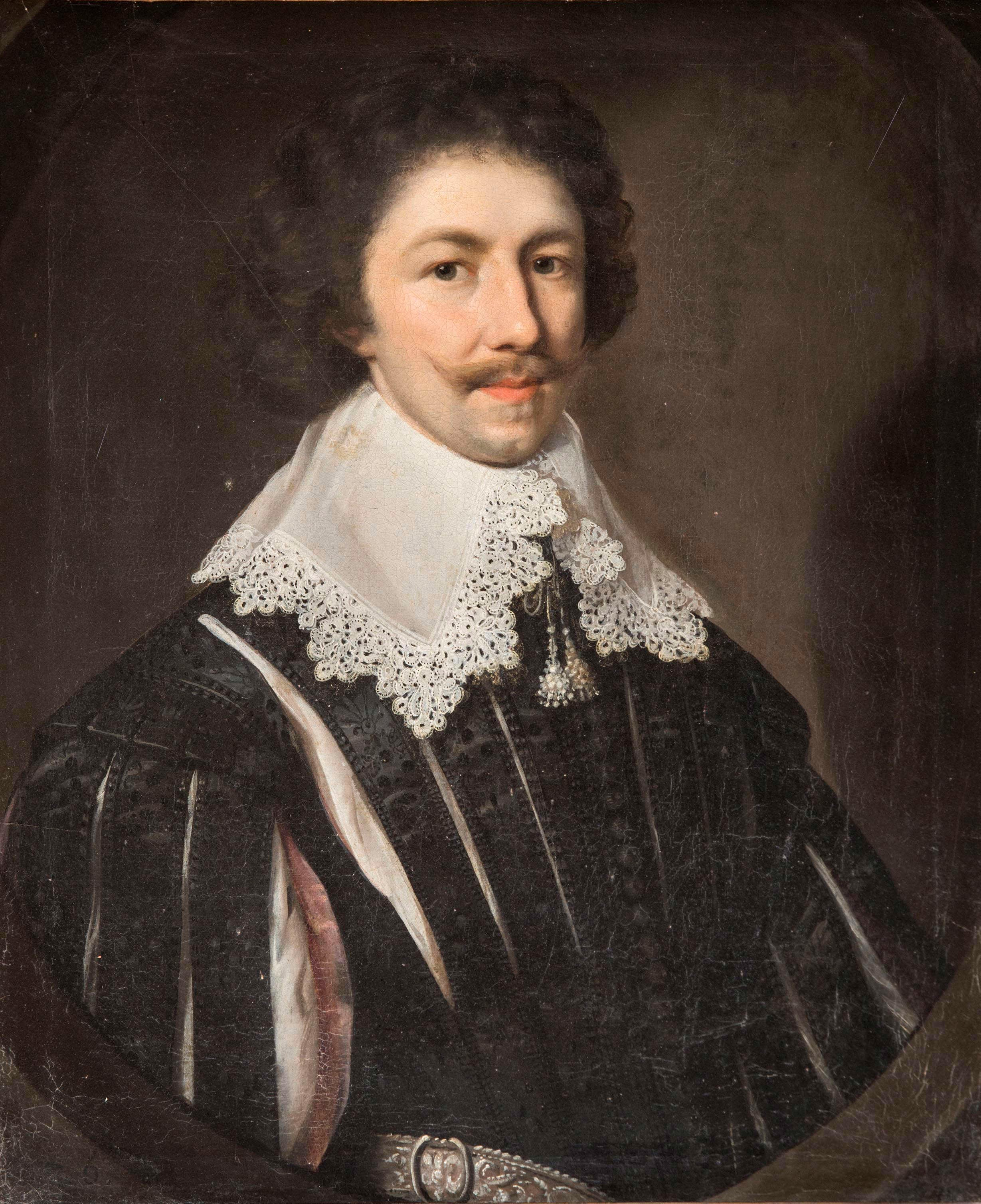
- portrait attributed to Cornelius Johnson, 1630
- Baptised: 3 March 1605
- Died: 9 February 1677
- Occupations: Lawyer, politician
- Spouse: Anne Pool
- Children: George Horner
- Parents: John Horner (father); Anne Speke (mother)

Sir George Horner (3 March 1605 – 9 February 1677) was an English lawyer and politician who sat in the House of Commons at various times between 1645 and 1660.

Horner was the son of Sir John Horner of Mells Manor and his wife Anne Speke, daughter of George Speke of White Lackington. He matriculated at Lincoln College, Oxford on 20 June 1623, aged 17 and was awarded BA on 3 May 1625. He was called to the bar at Lincoln's Inn in 1633.

In 1645, Horner was elected member of parliament for Somerset in the Long Parliament. The election was declared void and Horner was returned on the new writ in 1646. He was a Presbyterian, but was described as "a known neuter, if not worse", when he was elected. He was excluded under Pride's Purge in 1648 and took no part in politics during the Interregnum. In 1659, he was regarded as a Royalist.

In 1660, Horner was elected MP for Somerset in the Convention Parliament and knighted on 25 June 1660. He served as a justice of the peace and a deputy-lieutenant for Somerset from the same year until his death and was High Sheriff of Somerset for 1667–68.

Horner died at the age of 71 and was buried at Cloford on 19 February 1677. He had married Anne Poole, daughter of Sir Neville Poole. He was succeeded by his son George who was also MP for Somerset.

Parliament of England
Preceded by Sir John Poulett; Sir John Stawell	Member of Parliament for Somerset; 1645–1648; With: John Harrington	Succeeded by Not represented in Rump Parliament
