= Thomas Smith (Cavalier) =

English politician

Thomas Smith or Smyth
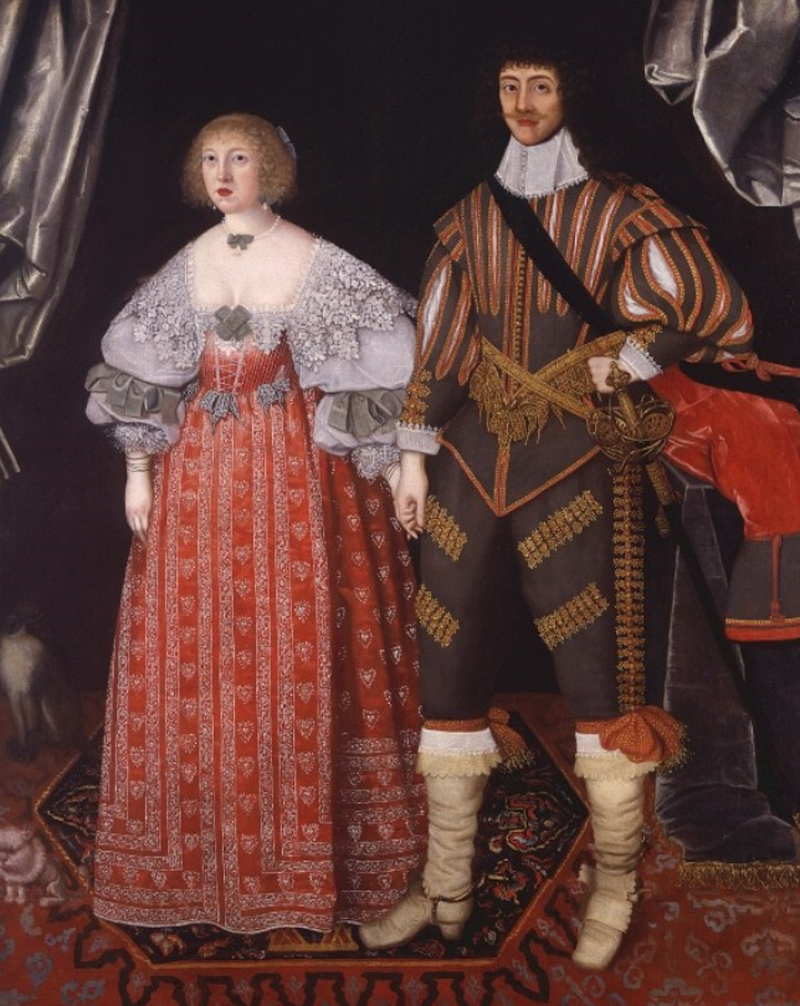
- Thomas Smith (right) with his wife Florence (left) in 1627
- Successor: Hugh Smith
- Born: June 1609
- Died: 2 October 1642 (aged 33)
- Spouses: Florence Poulet
- Issue Detail: Hugh Smith
- Father: Hugh Smith
- Mother: Marquess Elizabeth Gorges

Thomas Smith or Smyth (June 1609 – 2 October 1642) was an English politician who sat in the House of Commons at various times between 1628 and 1642. He fought for the Royalist cause in the English Civil War.

Smith, of Long Ashton in Somerset, was the eldest son of Sir Hugh Smith (1574–1627) and his wife Elizabeth Gorges, a daughter of Thomas Gorges of Lanford and Helena Snakenborg, Marchioness of Northampton. He was head of wealthy Somerset family, descended from a 16th-century Mayor of Bristol.

In 1628, Smith was elected Member of Parliament for Bridgwater and sat until 1629 when King Charles decided to rule without parliament for eleven years. In April 1640, he was elected MP for Somerset in the Short Parliament. He was elected MP for Bridgwater again in the Long Parliament from February 1641 until August 1642, when he was disabled from sitting for his sympathies. He joined the Marquess of Hertford's royal army, and was serving with that force when he died at Cardiff in October 1642.

Smith married Florence Poulett (died 1677), daughter of Lord Poulett, on 12 April 1627. After the Restoration their son, Hugh (1632–1680), was created a baronet.
