= Edward Brooke, 6th Baron Cobham =

English peer

Arms of Brooke, Baron Cobham "of Kent": Gules, on a chevron argent a lion rampant sable crowned or

Edward Brooke, 6th Baron Cobham (c. 1415 – 6 June 1464), lord of the Manor of Cobham, Kent, was an English peer.

== Biography ==
His parents were Sir Thomas Brooke and wife Joan Braybroke, 5th Baroness Cobham.

He was a member of parliament for Somerset in 1442, the same year he succeeded to his mother's title. An ardent supporter of Richard Duke of York, he fought on the Yorkist side at the First Battle of St Albans on 23 May 1455 and at the Battle of Northampton on 10 July 1460.

He married Elizabeth Touchet (b. c. 1433), daughter of James Touchet, 5th Baron Audley, and his first wife Margaret de Ros, and had at least two children, John Brooke, 7th Baron Cobham and Elizabeth Brooke, married to Robert Tanfield; their son, also named Robert Tanfield (b. 1461), married Catherine Nevill (b. bef. 1473), daughter of Edward Nevill, 1st Baron Bergavenny, and second wife Katherine Howard, and had issue. His widow remarried Christopher Worsley, before 8 November 1464.

Peerage of England
Preceded by Joan Brooke	Baron Cobham; 1442–1464	Succeeded by John Brooke
