= Somerset (UK Parliament constituency) =

Former parliamentary constituency in the United Kingdom

- Former county constituency for the House of Commons
- County: Somerset

1290–1832
- Seats: Two
- Replaced by: East Somerset and West Somerset

Somerset was a parliamentary constituency in Somerset, which returned two Members of Parliament (MPs), known traditionally as knights of the shire, to the House of Commons of England until 1707, the House of Commons of Great Britain from 1707 to 1800, and the House of Commons of the United Kingdom from 1801 to 1832.

Elections were held by the bloc vote system.

== Members of Parliament ==
=== MPs 1290–1629 ===
- Constituency created (1290)

Parliament	First member	Second member
Parliament of 1366	Hugh de Durborough	William Bonville
Parliament of 1368	Hugh de Durborough	Walter Blewet
Parliament of 1369	Edward Cheney	Matthew de Clevedon
Parliament of 1371	John Beauchamp of Lillisdon	
Parliament of 1372	Hugh de Durborough	John Reynon
Parliament of 1373	Sir John Delamare	Walter Blewet
Parliament of 1376	Thomas Marshall	
Parliament of 1377	Sir John Delamare	Sir Thomas Hungerford
Parliament of 1379	Sir John Burghersh	
Parliament of 1382	Sir John Delamare	Sir Thomas Hungerford
Parliament of 1383 (Oct)	Sir William Bonville	
Parliament of 1384 (Apr)	Sir William Bonville	
Parliament of 1384 (Nov)	Sir William Bonville	
Parliament of 1386	Sir William Bonville	Sir Thomas Brooke
First Parliament of 1388	Sir William Bonville	Sir Thomas Brooke
Second Parliament of 1388	Sir Thomas Hungerford	Sir John Burghersh
First Parliament of 1390	Sir Stephen Derby	Thomas Beaupine
Second Parliament of 1390	Sir John Berkeley	Sir Thomas Hungerford
Parliament of 1391	Sir John Rodney	Sir Thomas Brooke
Parliament of 1393	Sir Thomas Brooke	Sir William Bonville
Parliament of 1394	Sir Humphrey Stafford I	Sir John Berkeley
Parliament of 1395	Sir William Bonville	Sir Thomas Brooke
First Parliament of 1397	Sir Thomas Brooke	Sir Thomas Arthur
Second Parliament of 1397	Sir Ivo Fitzwaryn	Sir Thomas Brooke
Parliament of 1399	Sir Thomas Brooke	Sir William Bonville
Parliament of 1401	Sir Thomas Beauchamp	William Stourton
Parliament of 1402	Sir Thomas Brooke	William Stourton
First Parliament of 1404	Sir Thomas Brooke	William Stourton
Second Parliament of 1404	Sir Hugh Lutrell	Sir Leonard Hakluyt
Parliament of 1406	Sir Walter Rodney	Sir Leonard Hakluyt
Parliament of 1407	Sir Thomas Brooke	Richard Cheddar
Parliament of 1410	Walter Hungerford	Sir Thomas Brooke
Second Parliament of 1413	Sir Thomas Brooke	Richard Cheddar
First Parliament of 1414	Sir John Tiptoft	Sir Hugh Luttrell
Second Parliament of 1414	Sir Hugh Luttrell	Robert Hill
Parliament of 1415	Sir Hugh Luttrell	Robert Hill
First Parliament of 1416	Robert Hill	Richard Boyton
Parliament of 1417	Thomas Brooke	Richard Cheddar
Parliament of 1419	Robert Hill	John Stourton
Parliament of 1420	Sir Thomas Stawell	John Stourton
First Parliament of 1421	Sir William Bonville	Sir Thomas Brooke
Second Parliament of 1421	Richard Cheddar	John Stourton
Parliament of 1424	Giles Daubeney	
Parliament of 1429	Giles Daubeney	
Parliament of 1433	John Hody	
Parliament of 1435	John Hody	
Parliament of 1437	John Hody	
Parliament of 1455	William Courtenay	
Parliament of 1529	Sir Nicholas Wadham	Sir William Stourton
Parliament of 1539	Sir Hugh Paulet	Sir Thomas Speke
Parliament of 1545	Sir Thomas Speke	Sir John St Loe
Parliament of 1547	Sir Maurice Berkeley	Sir Henry Capell
First Parliament of 1553	Sir Ralph Hopton	Sir Edward Rogers
Second Parliament of 1553	Sir Edward Rogers	Sir Ralph Hopton
First Parliament of 1554	Sir Edward Waldegrave	Sir John Sydenham
Second Parliament of 1554	Sir Edward Waldegrave	Humphrey Colles
Parliament of 1555	?Sir Ralph Hopton	?Sir John St Loe
Parliament of 1558	Sir Edward Rogers	John Walshe
Parliament of 1559	Sir Edward Rogers	Sir William St Loe
Parliament of 1562–1567	Sir Edward Rogers	Sir Maurice Berkeley
Parliament of 1571	Amias Paulet	George Rogers
Parliament of 1572–1581	Sir Hugh Paulet died Sir George Speke	Sir Maurice Berkeley
Parliament of 1584–1585	Thomas Horner	(Sir) Henry Berkeley
Parliament of 1586–1587	Thomas Horner	(Sir) Henry Berkeley
Parliament of 1588–1589	(Sir) Francis Hastings	Edward Dyer
Parliament of 1593	(Sir) Francis Hastings	Edward Dyer
Parliament of 1597–1598	Sir Francis Popham	Sir Hugh Portman
Parliament of 1601	(Sir) Edward Phelips	Sir Maurice Berkeley
Parliament of 1604–1611	(Sir) Edward Phelips	Sir Francis Hastings died 1610; In his place John Poulett
Addled Parliament (1614)	Sir Maurice Berkeley	Sir Francis Hastings died 1610; In his place John Poulett
Parliament of 1621–1622	Robert Hopton	Sir Henry Portman died 1621; In his place Charles Berkeley
Happy Parliament (1624–1625)	Sir Robert Phelips	John Symes
Useless Parliament (1625)	Sir Robert Phelips	John Stawell
Parliament of 1625–1626	Sir Henry Berkeley	Sir John Horner
Parliament of 1628–1629	Sir Robert Phelips	Sir Edward Rodney
No Parliament summoned 1629–1640

=== MPs 1640–1832 ===
Election	First member	First party	Second member	Second party
April 1640	Sir Ralph Hopton	Royalist	Thomas Smith	Royalist
November 1640	Sir John Poulett	Royalist	Sir John Stawell	Royalist
August 1642	Poulett and Stawell disabled from sitting – both seats vacant			
1645	George Horner		John Harrington	
Election declared void and new writ issued
1646	George Horner		John Harrington	
December 1648	Horner excluded in Pride's Purge – seat vacant		Harrington did not sit after Pride's Purge	
Somerset had four members in the Barebones Parliament
1653	General-at-sea Robert Blake, John Pine, Dennis Hollister, Henry Henley			
Somerset had eleven members in the First and Second Parliaments of the Protectorate
1654	Sir John Horner, John Buckland, General John Desborough, John Preston, John Harrington, John Ashe, Charles Steynings, Robert Long, Richard Jones, Thomas Hippisley, Samuel Perry			
1656	John Buckland, General John Desborough, John Harrington, John Ashe, Robert Long, Alexander Popham, Colonel John Gorges, Francis Luttrell, Sir Lislebone Long, William Wyndham, Francis Rolle			
Representation reverted to two members for the Third Protectorate Parliament
January 1659	John Buckland,		Robert Hunt	
May 1659	Not represented in the restored Rump			
April 1660	George Horner		Hugh Smith	
1661	Sir John Stawell		Edward Phelips	
1662	John Poulett		Edward Phelips	
1665	Sir John Warre		Edward Phelips	
1669	Sir John Sydenham		Edward Phelips	
February 1679	Sir John Sydenham		Sir Hugh Smith	
August 1679	Sir William Portman		George Speke	
1685	Sir John Smith		George Horner	
1689	Edward Gorges		George Horner	
1690	Sir Edward Phelips		Nathaniel Palmer	
1695	Sir John Smith		Sir John Trevelyan, Bt	
1698	John Hunt		Sir Edward Phelips	
1699	John Hunt		Nathaniel Palmer	
January 1701	John Hunt		Sir John Trevelyan, Bt	
December 1701	Sir Philip Sydenham		Nathaniel Palmer	
1705	John Pigott		Nathaniel Palmer	
1708	Henry Seymour Portman		John Prowse	
April 1710	Henry Seymour Portman		Sir William Wyndham, Bt	Tory
October 1710	Sir Thomas Wroth	Tory	Sir William Wyndham, Bt	Tory
1713	Thomas Horner	Tory	Sir William Wyndham, Bt	Tory
1715	William Helyar		Sir William Wyndham, Bt	Tory
1722	Edward Phelips		Sir William Wyndham, Bt	Tory
1727	Thomas Strangways Horner	Tory	Sir William Wyndham, Bt	Tory
1740	Thomas Strangways Horner	Tory	Thomas Prowse	
1741	Henry William Portman	Tory	Thomas Prowse	
1747	Sir Charles Kemys Tynte		Thomas Prowse	
1767	Sir Charles Kemys Tynte		Sir Thomas Dyke Acland, Bt	
1768	Sir Charles Kemys Tynte		Richard Hippisley Coxe	
1774	Edward Phelips		Richard Hippisley Coxe	
1780	Sir John Trevelyan, Bt		Richard Hippisley Coxe	
1784	Sir John Trevelyan, Bt		Edward Phelips	
1792	Sir John Trevelyan, Bt		Henry Hippisley Coxe	
1795	Sir John Trevelyan, Bt		William Gore-Langton	Whig
1796	William Dickinson	Tory	William Gore-Langton	Whig
June 1806	Thomas Lethbridge	Tory	William Gore-Langton	Whig
November 1806	Thomas Lethbridge	Tory	William Dickinson	Tory
1812	William Gore-Langton	Whig	William Dickinson	Tory
1820	Sir Thomas Lethbridge	Tory	William Dickinson	Tory
1830	Edward Ayshford Sanford	Whig	William Dickinson	Tory
1831	Edward Ayshford Sanford	Whig	William Gore-Langton	Whig
1832	constituency divided into Eastern and Western divisions			

== Sources ==
- D Brunton & D H Pennington, Members of the Long Parliament (London: George Allen & Unwin, 1954)
- Cobbett's Parliamentary history of England, from the Norman Conquest in 1066 to the year 1803 (London: Thomas Hansard, 1808)
- Willis, Browne (1750). Notitia Parliamentaria, Part II: A Series or Lists of the Representatives in the several Parliaments held from the Reformation 1541, to the Restoration 1660 ... London. p. 1.
- Henry Stooks Smith, The Parliaments of England from 1715 to 1847, Volume 2 (London: Simpkin, Marshall & Co, 1845)
