= Arthur Stourton =

English courtier

Arthur Stourton or Sturton (died 1558) was an English courtier, keeper of royal jewels and robes, and Member of Parliament with Robert Southwell for the Westminster constituency in 1553.

== Family background ==
Arthur Stourton was a son of William Stourton, 7th Baron Stourton and Elizabeth Dudley, daughter of Edmund Dudley. He married Anne Macwilliam, a sister of Henry Macwilliam. His main estate was at Moignes Court in Dorset.

== Royal jewels and robes ==
Stourton was joint keeper of jewels and robes at Westminster Palace with Andrew Dudley. He had the safekeeping of some of Dudley's jewels, and items issued to Dudley for his wedding.

=== Cloth of gold vestments and copes ===
According to the historian John Strype and Henry Machyn's Diary, Stourton received vestments and copes of cloth of gold collected from churches by commissioners, appointed after the Reformation, in the reign of Edward VI (said to be a scheme of the Duke of Northumberland), and he redistributed them back to the parishes in the reign of Mary I of England. Northumberland called Stourton his nephew.

Records survive of some cloth of gold delivered to Stourton from churches in Surrey and other counties, Stourton received vestments from Canterbury in May 1553. The vestments, like some church plate, were thought to be surplus to church requirements by the Edwardian reformers. The cloth of gold or silver and tissue fabrics were regarded like surplus "jewels" by the commission, and so these materials were not sold in the parishes but sent to Stourton at the Royal Wardrobe.

In the autumn of 1553, policy changed under Mary I, and some of collected materials were returned. Stourton was paid by the parishioners of St Mary Woolnoth after searching for their two tabernacles in diverse parishes. In May 1556, by the order of Philip and Mary, the process of confiscation was reversed. Stourton returned vestments to churches including St Mary-at-Hill in London. Henry Machyn had a personal interest in the proceedings as parish clerk of Holy Trinity the Less, and wrote that "Trinity parish had not their cope of cloth of gold again".

=== Jewels and Mary's wardrobe ===
He made an inventory of jewels associated with Lady Jane Grey or with Anne Seymour, Duchess of Somerset, and delivered cloth and jewels to Lady Jane Grey at the Tower of London on 10 and 14 July 1553.

Stourton supplied velvet from the wardrobe for Mary's coronation. He sent cloths to Peterborough Cathedral to adorn the tomb of Catherine of Aragon.

Stourton made inventories of jewels in the royal wardrobe. One list, copied from his registers after his decease, includes notes of items issued to the gentlewomen of Mary I of England for her use, including to Susan Clarencieux and Frideswide Strelley. Mary gave a length of black silver tinsel cloth to Lady Jerningham for her daughter Mary's wedding to Thomas Southwell in 1558. A letter from the Loseley manuscripts collection from Henry Jerningham to Thomas Cawarden mentions a possible delivery of wardrobe stuff for revels at "Sturtuntes hand".

== Death ==
Stourton died in February 1558 and was buried at St Martin-in-the-Fields. His executors, William Stourton and Edmund Felton, transferred apparel in his custody to George Brediman, his successor in the royal wardrobe.

George Brediman issued copes and vestments from the wardrobe to Kat Ashley, chief gentlewoman of the bedchamber to Elizabeth I in December 1560. By the same warrant, fabrics were requested for "masking garments" to be sent to Thomas Benger, Master of the Revels.

== Marriage and children ==
Stourton's children included:

- Edward Stourton of Overmoigne
- Philip Stourton of Overmoigne, who married Joan St John, of Wiltshire
