= Nicholas Strelley =

Nicholas Strelley or Strelly or Styrley (died 1560) was an English soldier and captain of Berwick-upon-Tweed.

== Career ==
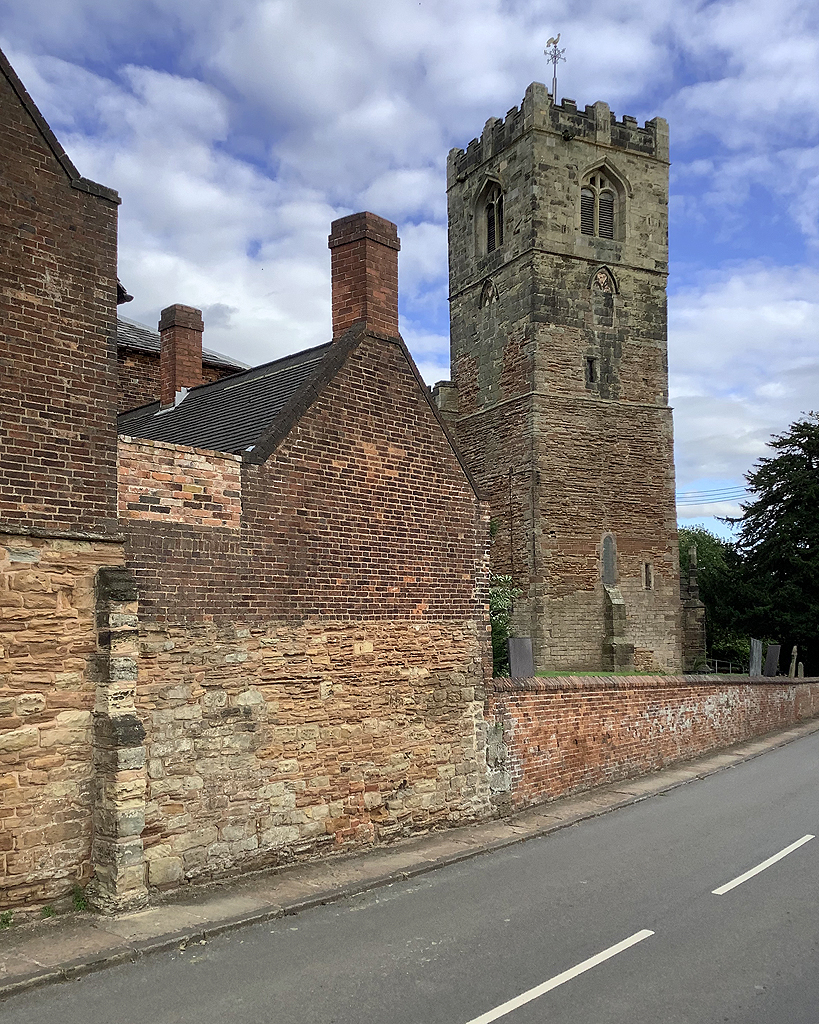
Strelley Village

Nicholas Strelley was a member of a family residing at Strelley Village. His father (died 1491) was also called Nicholas Strelley, and his mother was Katherine, a daughter of Richard West, 7th Baron De La Warr.

In May 1531, Strelley was Lieutenant of Sherwood Forest, and was asked to make a survey of the numbers of deer by royal commissioners. Strelley delayed and explained that it was the wrong time of year to disturb the deer.

During the Pilgrimage of Grace, Strelley came to Nottingham Castle with Thomas Manners, 1st Earl of Rutland, who sent him to report to Henry VIII. Henry replied that he sending Roger Ratcliffe, as an expert in wars, to advise on the fortification of Nottingham. Strelley, a "substantial gentleman", was sent to garrison Tickhill Castle near Doncaster with 100 foot soldiers and six cannon.

Strelley obtained Beauchief Abbey in 1537, paying £223 for the abbey site and the grange of Strawberry Lea at Totley. The old farmstead at Strawberry Lee was demolished in 1936. In May 1545, he made an agreement with John Willoughby of Wollaton for access and drainage of his coal at Bilborough.

Strelley was captain of Berwick at the Scottish border for Henry VIII and Edward VI. In June 1545 he was sent to Berwick to make improvements. Following Strelley's observations on the state of Berwick Castle in 1547, orders were given by the Privy Council to Thomas Gower to refurbish or construct a new brewhouse, and to level the rampart between the castle and town.

Strelley had difficulty with the competing jurisdiction of the mayor of Berwick, and complained that markets in the town were not regulated according to statute. This put the garrison at a disadvantage as local supplies were made more expensive. He was appointed deputy-warden of the East March in December 1551, but lost this second post in August 1552 when it was decided that border officers ought to hold only one position.

He died on 25 August 1560 and was buried at All Saints' Church, Strelley, where there is a monument.

== Marriage and family ==
He married three times. First; Sarah Digby, second; Ellen Gresley, and third; Elizabeth or Isabel Spencer, a daughter of John Spencer. His children included:

- Anthony Strelley, who married Jane, a daughter of Sir George Baynham of Clearwell. Their eldest son was Philip Strelley, father of Margaret Zinzan.
- Nicholas Strelley of Beauchief Abbey (died 1602), who married Bridget Thwaites (died 1591).
- John Strelley, who married Anne, daughter of Sir George Baynham
- Margaret Strelley, who married Richard White, a brother of Susan Clarencieux, and was the mother of George White (died 1584)
- Alice Strelley, who married John Byron
- Jane Strelley, who married the explorer Hugh Willoughby
- Robert Strelley, who married Frideswide Knight. It has also been suggested that Robert Strelley's father was Nicholas Strelley of Linby, who made Nicholas Strelley of Strelley the remainder man in his will.
