= Coronation of Mary I =

1553 coronation in England

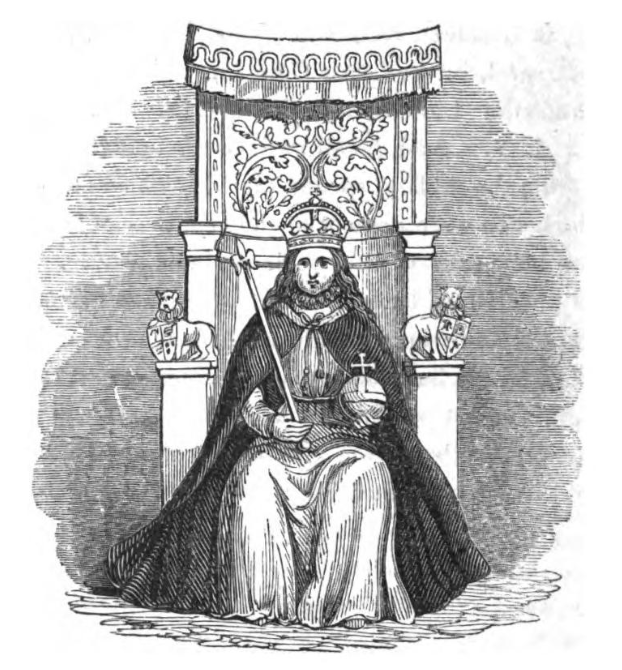
- Mary I as depicted on her seal, crowned and enthroned
- Date: 1 October 1553; 473 years ago
- Location: Westminster Abbey, London, England
- Participants: Queen Mary I; Bishop of Winchester; Peers of the Realm

The coronation of Mary I as Queen of England and Ireland took place at Westminster Abbey, London, on Sunday 1 October 1553. This was the first coronation of a queen regnant in England, a female ruler in her own right. The ceremony was therefore transformed. Ritual and costume were interlinked. Contemporary records insist the proceedings were performed "according to the precedents", but mostly these were provisions made previously for queens consort.

== Proclamation on 19 July ==
Mary I was proclaimed queen on 19 July 1553 by William Herbert, Earl of Pembroke, setting aside the claims of Lady Jane Grey, the crown was "most rightfully and lawfully" hers. The proclamation was reported to have been well-received, and an Italian observer compared the shouts and applause to a volcano erupting.

The Italian also wrote that in nearby streets, Sir John York, who was riding on horseback, was confused by the uproar, and shouted that rumours were untrue. York had to be rescued from the crowd by the Sheriff, William Garrett or Garrard. In fact, York was placed in the Sheriff's custody as a supporter of Lady Jane Grey.

In the Tower of London, the Duke of Suffolk went to the hall used by Lady Jane Grey and removed the canopy or cloth of state that conferred royal status on his daughter. She was said to have gladly acknowledged Mary's rights to the crown. A letter or order signed by Henry Nevill and others was sent to Nicholas Pelham and all the gentlemen of Sussex declaring Mary to be queen and denouncing Lady Jane Grey as "a quene of new and pretie invencion".

== The Oration gratulatory ==
Richard Taverner wrote an Oration gratulatory made upon the joyfull proclayming of the most noble Princes Quene Mary Quene of Englande, a pamphlet published by John Day describing the legitimacy of Mary's succession. Writers addressed the challenges to rule that Mary had overcome. Thomas Watertoune published a ballad, An Invective against Treason, and a ballad by Leonard Stopes compared her bloodless struggle to the biblical stories of Judith and Holofernes and Esther and Haman.

There was no English publication describing the coronation ceremony. A narrative description of the coronation was published in Italian and Spanish versions. These texts have many similarities with descriptions produced by diplomats. A Spanish narrative also gave an estimated cost of all the coronation events at 100,000 ducats.

== Religious issues ==
Mary intended to reverse the Reformation in England and restore the country to Catholicism, however the legal instruments necessary could only be enacted through Parliament, which by tradition, could not meet until after a coronation, which would be theoretically at least, a Protestant service. The Archbishop of Canterbury would usually conduct the coronation service, but besides being the leading Protestant reformer, was imprisoned in the Tower of London for sedition because of his role in promoting Lady Jane Grey; therefore the conservative Bishop of Winchester, Stephen Gardiner, was released from prison to perform the ceremony. Mary wrote to her cousin, Cardinal Reginald Pole in Rome, requesting absolution for herself and her fellow Catholics who took part in the service, and she sent to the Bishop of Arras for new holy oils. Mary also prepared a form of words to add to the coronation oath in case that obliged her to support Protestantism, however the actual text of the oath she took is not known.

== Plays and drama at the coronation ==
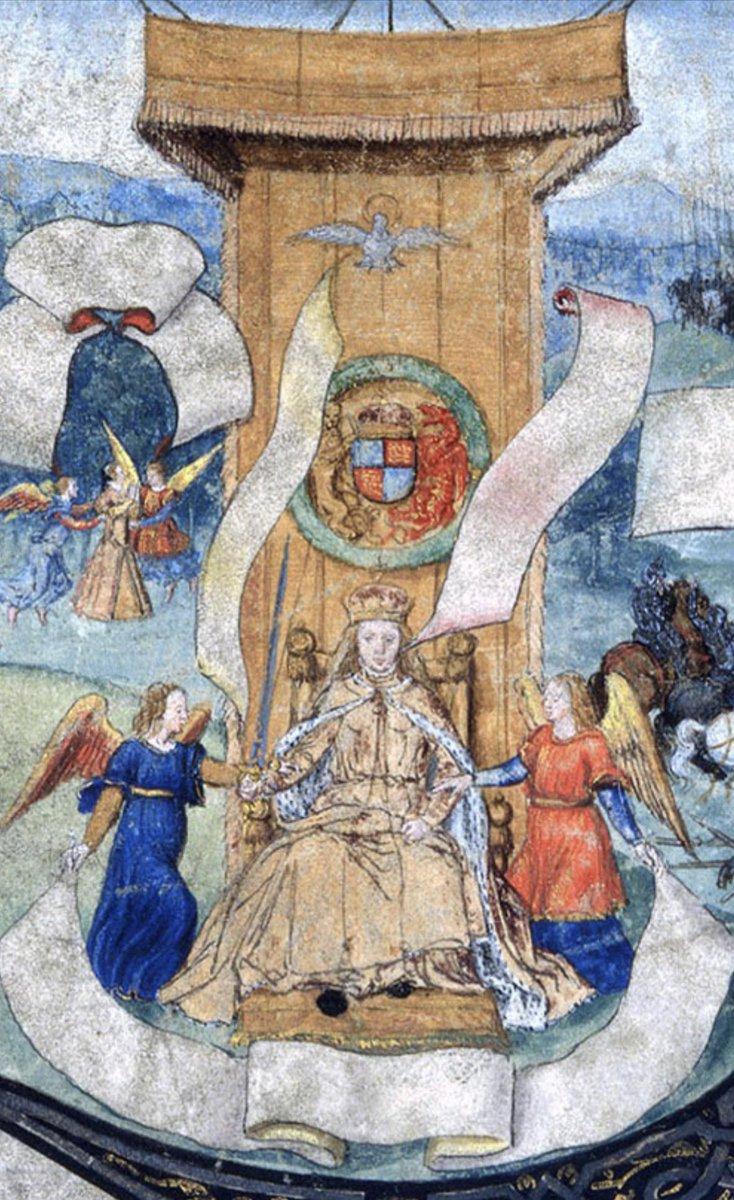
Mary I enthroned by angels depicted on a 1553 plea roll, with flowing hair.

The revels accounts include fabric for costumes for a play to be performed during Mary's coronation feasts, which included a good and a bad angel with a personification of the Genus Humanum. The troubles of the human race, Scarcity, Sickness, Feebleness and Deformity, were countered by Reason, Plenty, Verity, Self-Love, and Care. These were probably understood as virtues residing in Mary's court and realm. No text of this morality play has yet been identified. Mary made a warrant for the fabrics to Edward Waldegrave, Master of the Royal Wardrobe. His wife Frances dressed Mary after her anointing as queen.

There is some doubt as to whether the Genus Humanum play was performed at the coronation. Mary gave Thomas Cawarden a warrant for performing a play at the coronation on 26 September, while she was at St James' Palace. The accounts for making the costumes include a note that the performance was deferred until Christmas.

An anonymously authored play, Respublica, written for performance at Christmas presented some of issues in 1553 relating to Mary's accession and her relationship with Parliament. Respublica has sometimes been attributed to Nicholas Udall, but its authorship and connection to court revels is disputed. In the play, Mary is honoured as "Verity, the daughter of sage old Father Time". This echoes a motto used by Mary, Veritas Filia Temporis. The idea was of a "Truth" in opposition to Protestant reformers.

== Royal Entry to London ==
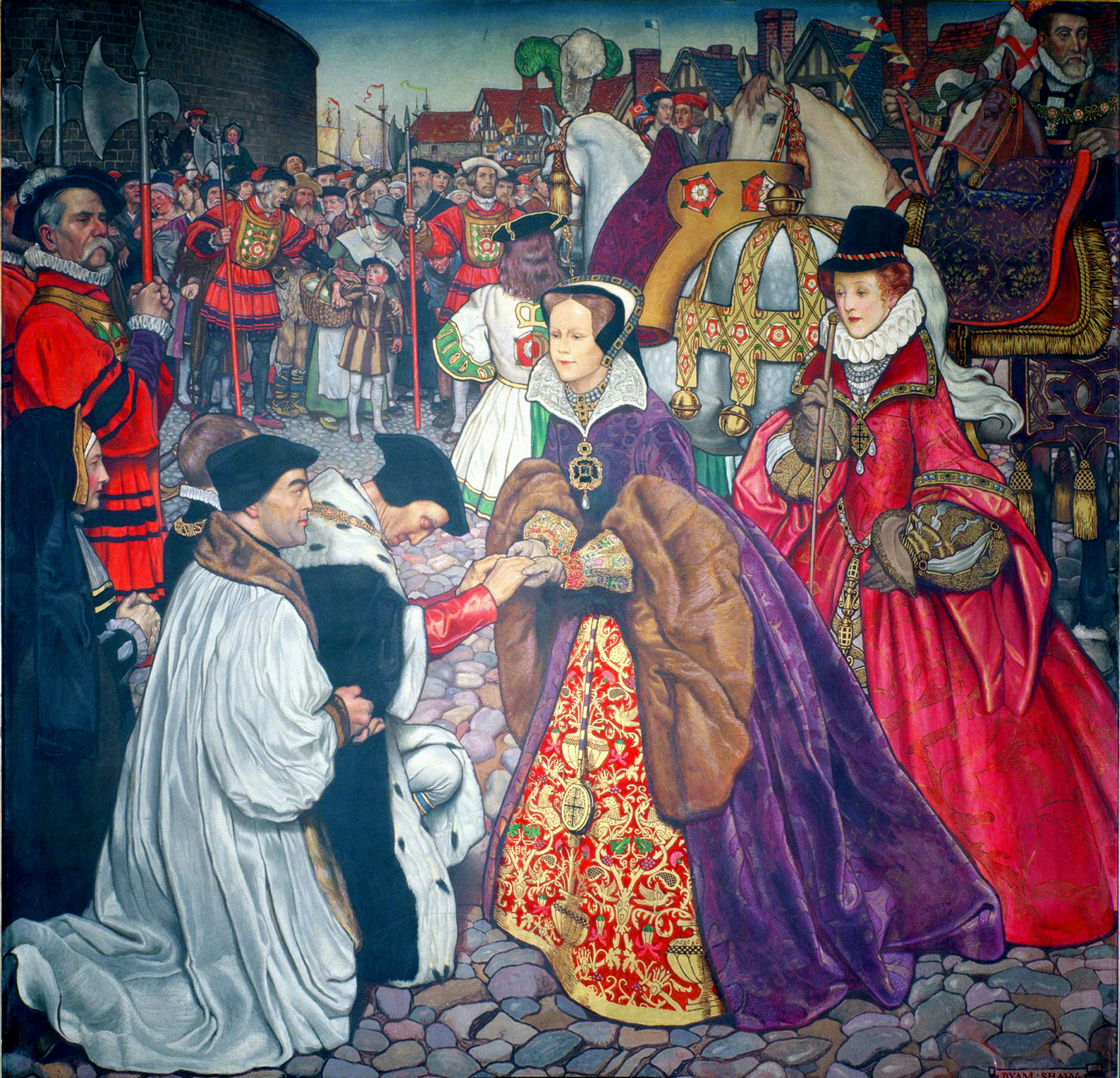
Royal Entry of Queen Mary I with Princess Elizabeth into London in a 1910 painting by Byam Shaw

Mary had been at Kenninghall in Norfolk and Framlingham in Suffolk. At Ipswich children presented her with a golden heart. She met her sister Princess Elizabeth at Wanstead. Elizabeth had arrived in London on 29 August, with a large and armed household and retinue.

Mary rode into London on 3 August 1553, in procession. On this occasion, according to Estienne Perlin, she wore violet velvet, "velours violet". Wriothesley says she changed her clothes in a house in Whitechapel, to a rich apparel of "purple velvet French fashion, with sleeves of the same, her kirtle of purple satin all thick set with goldsmith work and great pearl, with her foresleeves of the same set with rich stones". The ambassador Simon Renard described this costume similarly, as violet velvet, with skirts and sleeves embroidered with gold. She was followed by as many as 180 ladies and gentlemen. The French ambassador, Antoine de Noailles, avoided attending the Entry. According to Renard, Noailles claimed to be busy deciphering letters in his lodging at the Charterhouse. Renard wrote that Noailles was spotted observing some of the proceedings from a window, and he was able to provide a description of the procession.

On this occasion, she entered the city at Aldgate. Renard describes around 100 poor children dressed in blue as being at the city gate. One of them asked the Queen to take care of them. The incident appears in the chronicle of Edmund Howes and Charles Wriothesley, who mention a pageant at St Botolph's Aldgate involving the children of Christ's Hospital, a charity school founded by Protestants following the dissolution of the monasteries, arranged on a specially built stage. John Howes, writing in 1582, relates that when the Queen "came near unto them she cast her eye another way, and never stayed nor gave any countenance to them". However, Robert Persons wrote that Mary listened appreciatively to an oration made by the young Edmund Campion.

The funeral of Edward VI took place on 8 August at Westminster Abbey. Mary would make a formal Royal Entry or procession through the city on 30 September as a preliminary to her coronation. She gave Elizabeth a number of jewels on 23 September at St James's Palace, perhaps to wear on the day. Simon Renard reported that guns and arrows were being stockpiled in houses in London in case of any attempts against Mary's life.

=== Coronation eve ===
Mary left St James' Palace by barge for the Tower of London on 28 September 1553. She left with Elizabeth after dinner, or at 3 o'clock in order to "shoot" London Bridge at high tide. As Mary passed down the Thames, she was followed by boats trimmed with streamers and banners which carried the Mayor, Thomas White, and the Aldermen. Trumpets sounded, and minstrels and waits sang to the playing of shawms and regals. The garrison of the Tower fired a gun salute as she approached. After she alighted, and all was quiet, Mary turned and thanked the Mayor and aldermen in a loud voice.

The wardrobe accounts include sumptuous costume for Mary and her ladies for the reception on the "eve" of the coronation. Mary's robe and mantle were of gold and silver tissue. The phrase refers to a ceremony before the coronation when the Knights of the Bath made their preparations and bathed, which took place "according to the old usage of England" at the Tower of London on 29 September. In the morning, new knights were dubbed in the queen's chamber of presence by the Earl of Arundel, steward of the queen's household. He was given Mary's commission to make knights on this occasion, and to dub knight batchelors on 2 October at Westminster Palace.

Edward VI's coronation accounts also include payments for a robe and mantle to wear at the creation of the Knights of the Bath. The costume historian Janet Arnold proposed that Mary's tissue clothes were re-used by Elizabeth I at her coronation, after alterations, and may be depicted in a coronation portrait of Elizabeth.

=== The coronation entry ===
Mary made her royal entry on 30 September in the afternoon. She came from the Tower in a chariot or litter to the Palace of Westminster. The windows of houses along the route were decorated with tapestry or cloth of gold and cloth of silver, and the roads were strewn with grass and flowers. There are several accounts of the procession, and these vary in detail, possibly confusing the colour of fabrics used for the caparisons of horses and to drape the vehicles with the colours of costume worn by the participants. Robert Wingfield wrote that the number of her female attendants was uncountable and a novel sight, though the procession accorded to ancient custom.

First on the route were heraldic officers, knights, the justiciary, the secretaries, the treasurer of the household Thomas Cheney, lords and barons, the ambassadors and their escorts, representatives of the Steelyard, the bishops, and the Mayor of London. The Earl of Arundel carried the sword, flanked by the Duke of Norfolk and the Earl Marshal.

Mary wore a mantle and kirtle of cloth of gold, furred with miniver, or, according to the account of Antonio de Guarás, her litter was furbished with cloth of gold, and she was mantled in cloth of silver. On her head was a gold circlet, a kind of crown, set with precious stones and pearls, with a jewelled caul or veil made of tinsel fabric. She also wore this newly-made circlet to the coronation. Some chronicle accounts mention the weight of the circlet and caul, and that Mary had sometimes to support it with her hand. These comments may imply misogynistic criticism of this unprecedented female coronation.

Following behind was a procession, including the women of her household. Princess Elizabeth and Anne of Cleves followed in another litter or "chariot", with a covering "all of coth of silver all white". According to the French ambassador Antoine de Noailles and other diplomats, Elizabeth and Anne were dressed in cloth of silver with robes or gowns in the French fashion. Elizabeth's silver costume, although more elaborate than those of the women of the household, would have marked her status as lower than her elder sister's costume.

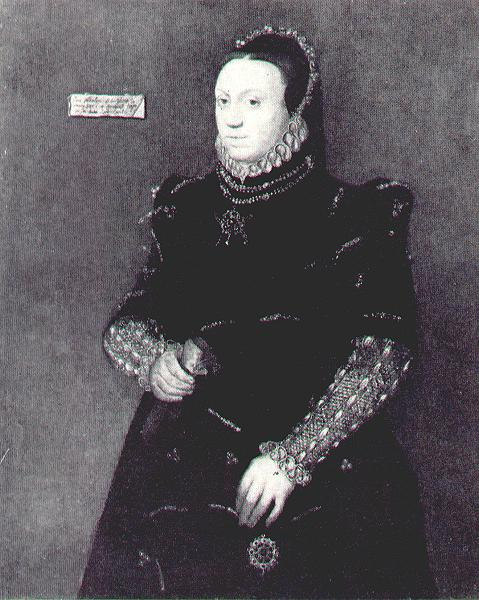
Jane Lumley, Baroness Lumley rode in a chariot during the Royal Entry, then aged around 16

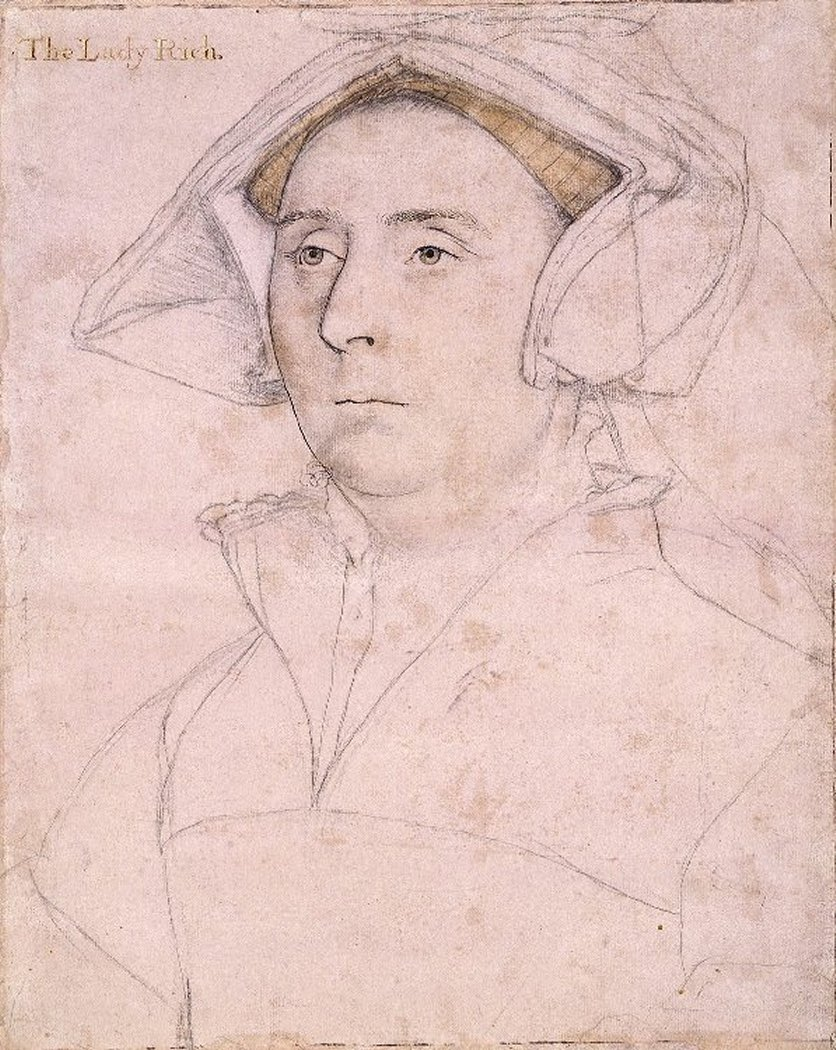
Elizabeth, Lady Rich, rode in the chariot with Lady Lumley

Four ladies in waiting rode on horseback beside the queen's litter, as the "ladies of Estate". These were the Duchess of Norfolk, the Marchioness of Exeter, the Marchioness of Winchester, and the Countess of Arundel. The women of the household followed, riding in three carriages called "chariots" or on horseback. Although English and Spanish accounts say the women were apparelled with crimson velvet, and their horses "trapped" with the same fabric, Noailles wrote that the ladies and women of the household were all dressed in furred silver and gold gowns, also in the French fashion, and their horse mantles, couvertes, were of red cramoisy velvet. The wardrobe account of Elizabeth I's coronation details similar fabrics for the chariots, and includes equivalent lengths of crimson velvet bought for the women's saddles.

The second chariot carried four "ladies of Honour"; Dorothy, the "old" Countess of Oxford, the Countess of Oxford; the Countess of Shrewsbury; and the Countess of Derby. The third chariot carried six ladies in waiting; Lady Stourton, Lady Lumley, Lady Wentworth, Lady Rich, Lady Paget, and Lady Mordaunt, followed by five ladies on horseback. Behind this group followed ten ladies and gentlewomen riding on horseback including Cecily, Lady Mansel, Elizabeth Kempe, Susan Clarencieux, Mary Finch, and "Mrs Sturley" (Frideswide Strelley).

More noblewomen and gentlewomen with mantles of crimson satin followed on horseback with the maids of honour, including Anne Bacon, Anne Basset, Anne Dormer, and the Mother of the Maids, Mistress Bayneham (perhaps, Cecily Gage, wife of George Baynham of Clearwell), or, according to some sources, Mistress Anne Poyntz. With the maids, riding behind the three chariots, were the serving gentlewomen known as chamberers, with mantles of crimson damask. There were 46 female riders in the procession, and Noailles estimated seventy women in total including the passengers in the litters. Behind them rode the henchmen and their master, dressed in the green and white Tudor colours. These were young men of school age.

There were pageants with music and speeches. At Fenchurch Street, Genoese merchants staged a welcome salutation given by a young actor portraying a girl in a chair or throne suspended in the air. There were four giants. Latin inscriptions on the triumphal arches were recorded by Giovanni Francesco Commendone, a Papal diplomat, and the French ambassador Noailles.

Hanse merchants made their pageant at Gracechurch Corner, with a mount and fountain running with wine. and an actor "flied down a rope" as the queen passed by. At the other end of the street, the Florentine merchants had built an arch with three entries, six actors above welcomed Mary, and on top a statue of an angel dressed in green appeared to play a trumpet. The Florentine pageant included Queen Tomyris and Judith, leaders who defeated and decapitated their enemies, and seems to have celebrated Mary's recent triumph over the Duke of Northumberland.

The City of London made a pageant at the Conduit in Cornhill. Aldermen stood at their pageant by the Conduit in Cheap, and the Recorder of London gave a speech. By St Paul's school, John Heywood made an oration in Latin and English. At St Paul's Cathedral, "Peter, a Dutchman", danced with streamers on the steeple.

Sympathetic reporters of Mary's accession proclamation and royal entry, like the Imperial ambassadors and Charles Wriothesley, wrote that the London streets were full of her supporters, who threw their caps in the air without any hope of recovering them in the crowds, crying 'Long live Queen Mary'.

== Coronation ==
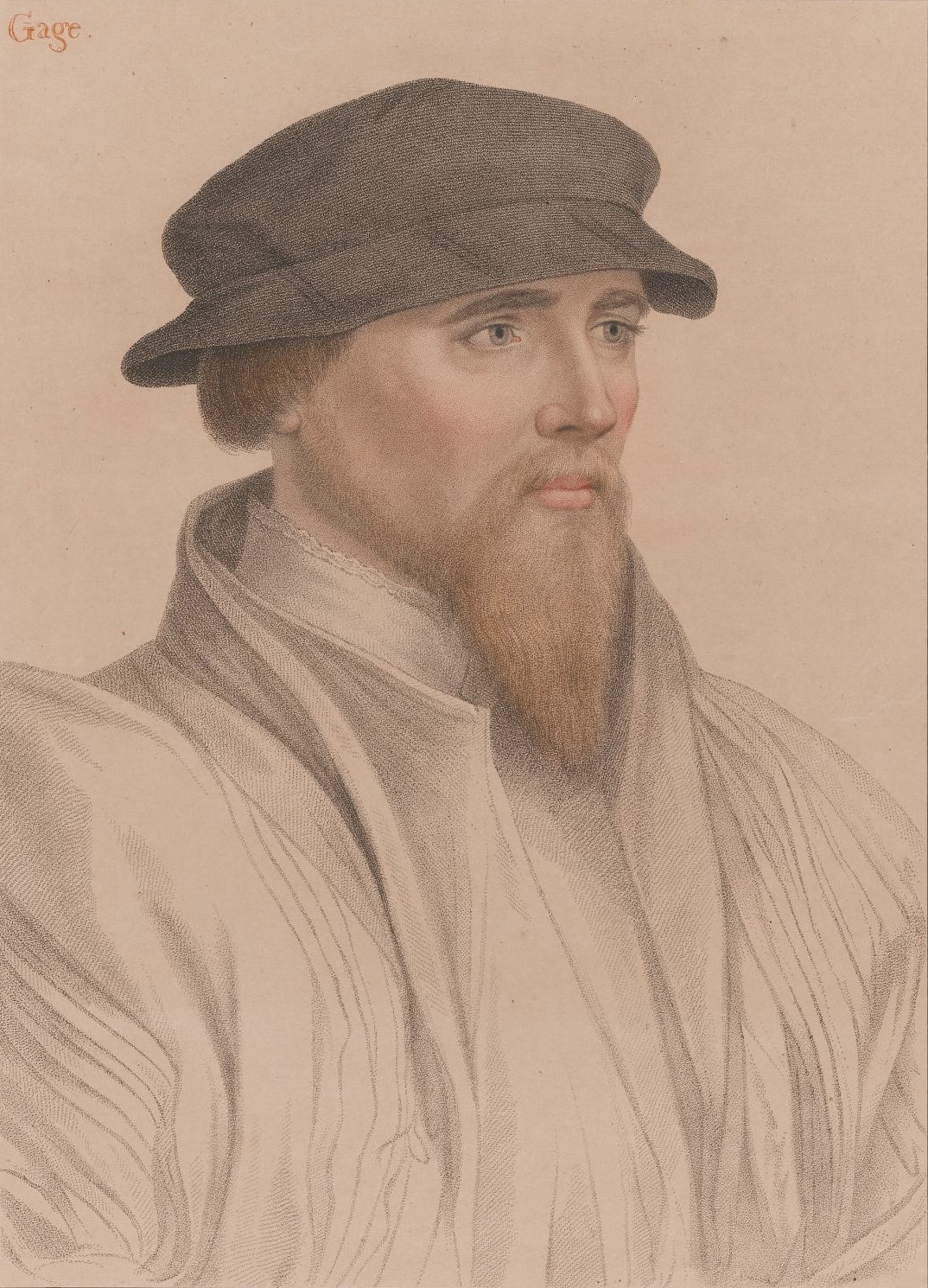
John Gage helped the Duchess of Norfolk carry Mary's train into Westminster Abbey

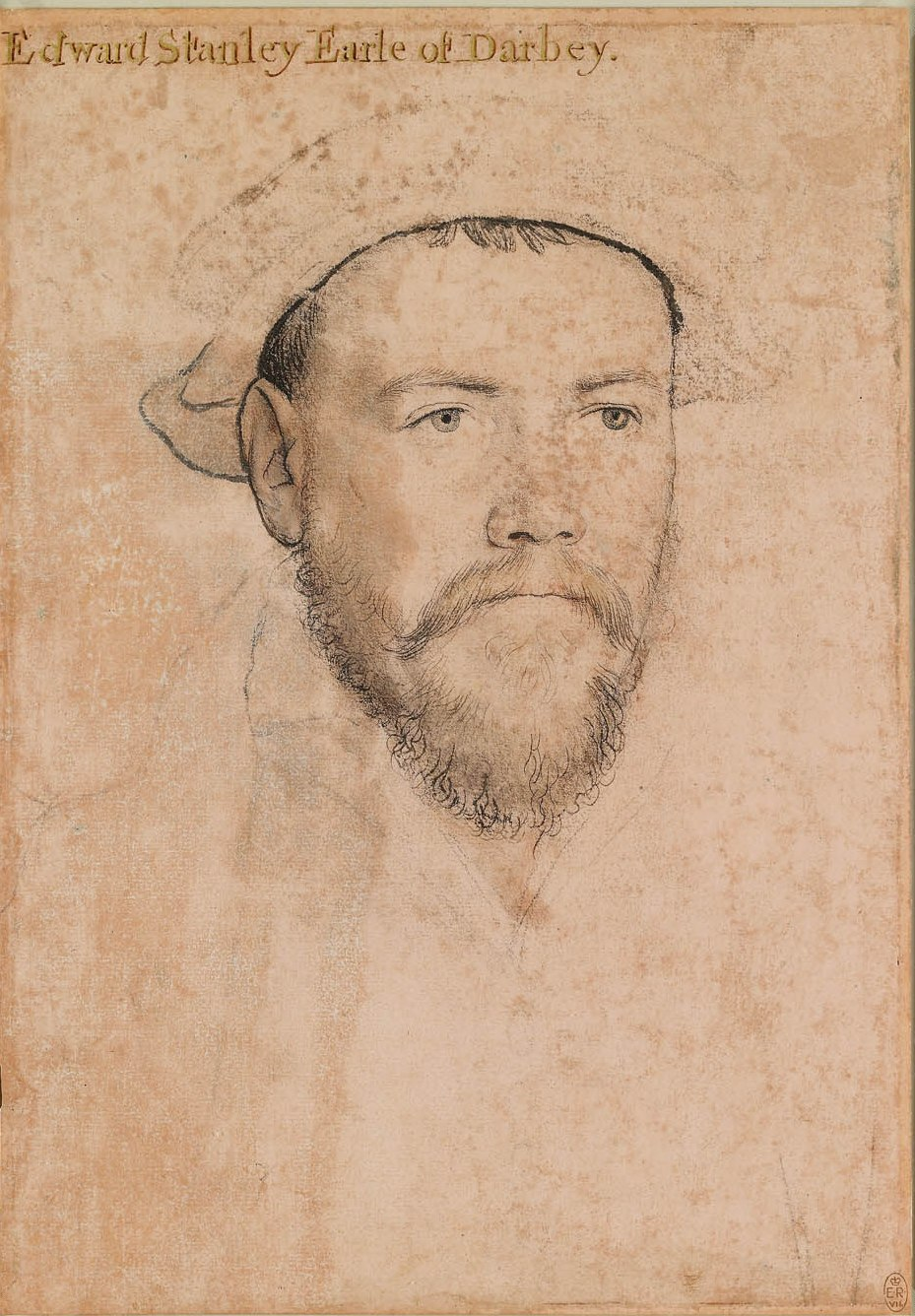
Edward Stanley, 3rd Earl of Derby carried the sword "curtana" symbolic of Mercy

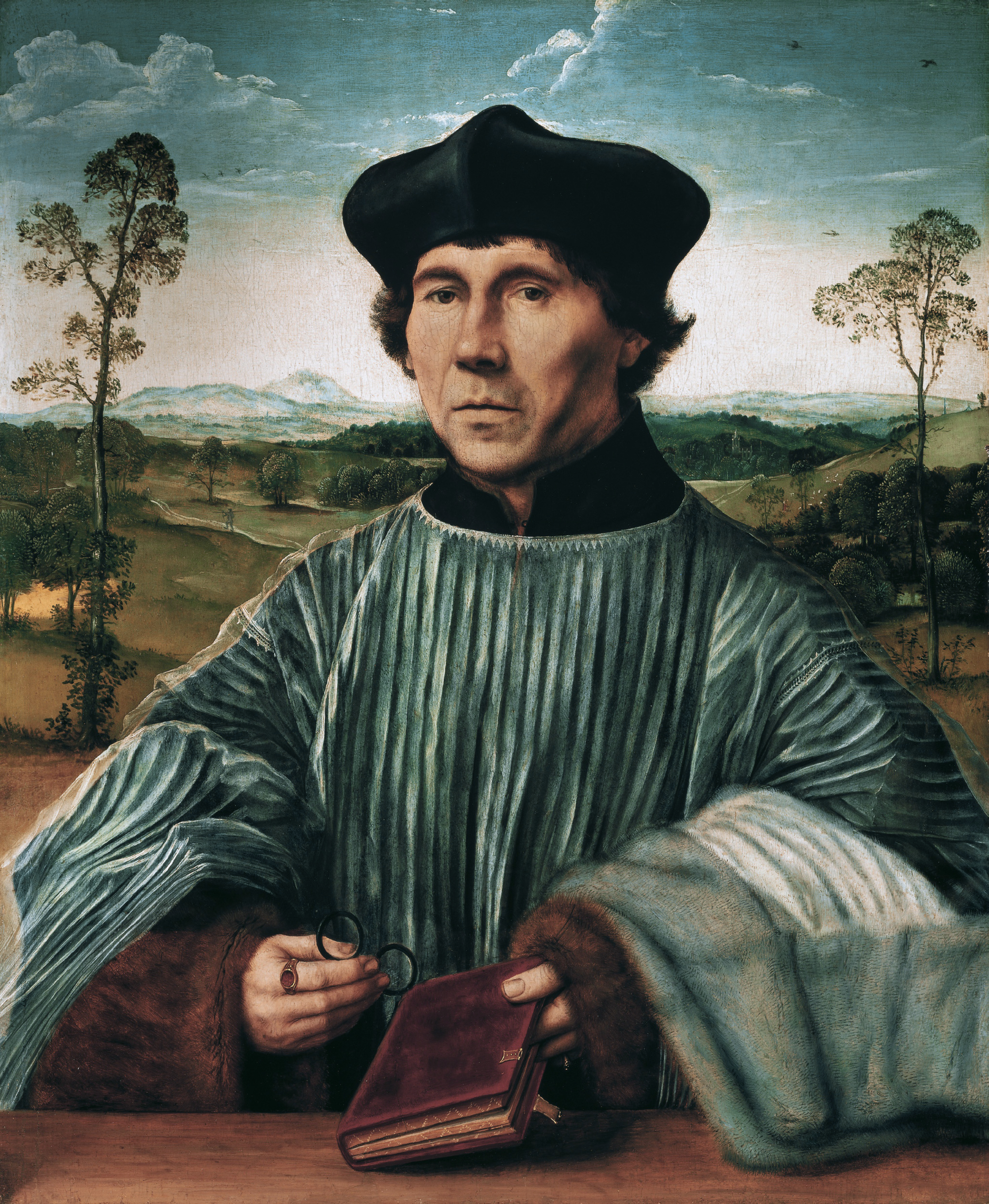
Mary was crowned by Stephen Gardiner

On 1 October, Mary arrived by barge at the privy stairs of the Old Palace of Westminster. As Mary walked from Westminster Hall to the Abbey in the morning, three naked swords were carried before her. Two of swords, carried by the Earls of Westmorland and Cumberland, represented Spiritual and Temporal justice. The third sword, the curtana, was carried by the Earl of Derby and represented Mercy. The great bearing sword was refurbished by the cutler John Ailande. Anne of Cleves and Princess Elizabeth attended Mary as she processed into the Abbey. Countesses and noblewomen walked in pairs, holding their coronets.

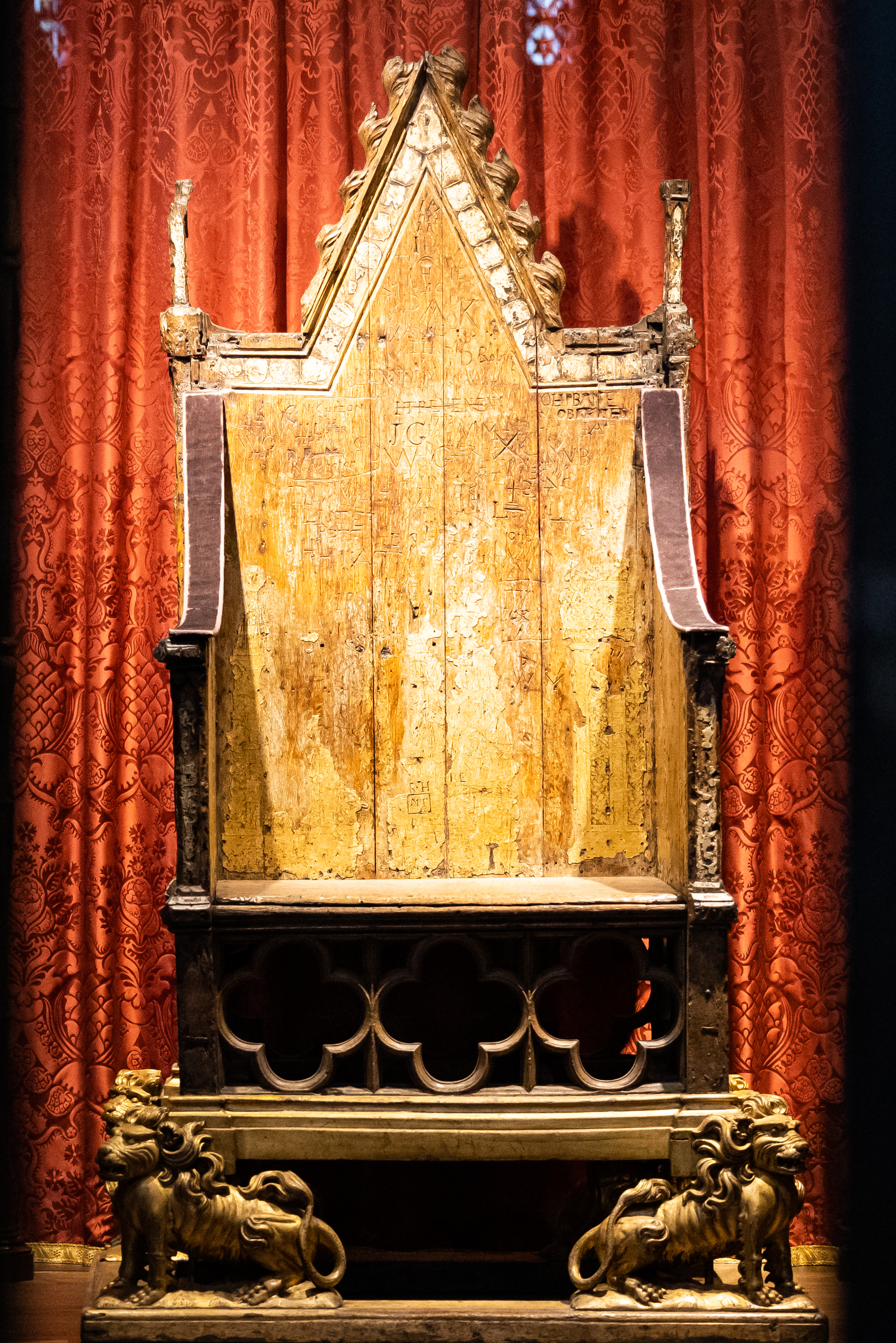
Mary was first seated in the Abbey in King Edward's chair

Mary's train was carried by the Lord Chamberlain, John Gage, and the Duchess of Norfolk. The quire of the Abbey was hung with tapestry and the floor was strewn with rushes. When Mary entered the Abbey, the Bishop declared the Queen's pardon for prisoners, excluding those in the Tower of London and some in the Marshalsea. The exceptions included those who had supported Lady Jane Grey.

=== The mount and St Edward's chair ===
Mary was led to King Edward's chair by two noblemen. After a short repose, she was joined by Stephen Gardiner, Bishop of Winchester and Lord Chancellor, on the raised scaffold or mount in sight of the people. The chair was at the centre of the mount, draped with rich fabrics. According to Antonio de Guaras, the chair was placed on a higher platform with ten steps. A diagram of the stage used at the coronation of Elizabeth I shows the chair raised on an octagonal mount with five steps placed on the platform. On the back of the "white chair" were two carved lions on the corner posts and a fleur-de-lis topping the centre.

The "great white chair" was similarly described in an account of the Coronation of Edward VI. The ambassador Simon Renard mentioned that Mary sat on a "stone chair covered with brocade" at the banquet after the coronation. The stone had been brought from Scotland as a token of victory, the Stone of Scone (now displayed at Perth Museum).

Mary showed herself at the four corners of the mount, and Gardiner introduced her as queen, a part of the ceremony known as "recognition". Edward VI had been carried to the corners of his dais on a little chair by ushers. The ushers who guarded Mary's chair were Masters George Tyrrel, John Norris, Dauncey and Roger Lyggens, men who served as daily waiters in the queen's household. Norris later compiled a treatise on ceremonial for gentlemen ushers.

Gardiner asked for the people's assent, and they cried out in one voice "God save Queen Mary".

=== The traverse ===
Mary then went to a richly draped chair at the high altar and made her offerings. George Day, Bishop of Chichester gave a sermon on the theme of obedience. Mary made her oaths, and the choir sang Veni Creator Spiritus. When Mary was to be anointed, according to some accounts, she went into a "traverse" on the right hand side of the high altar and was undressed by ladies of privy chamber. A traverse is usually a space curtained off under a canopy. A Spanish account calls it un lugar apartado, a space apart. It has been suggested that the traverse was located in St Edward's Chapel.

Mary was dressed in a different costume and, putting aside the mantle, was anointed by Stephen Gardiner within the traverse. Holy oil had been obtained by the Imperial ambassador Simon Renard from the Bishop of Arras. The stock of oil left over from the Protestant reign of Edward VI was considered unhallowed. William Paget, 1st Baron Paget and three other barons held silver staves supporting a "paill" or canopy over her during the anointing. The canopy was to be made of gold "cloth of baudekin" lined with silk sarsenet, but crimson satin embroidered with gold was used instead.

=== Three crowns and two sceptres ===
The Duke of Norfolk brought the three crowns, St Edward's Crown, the Imperial crown, and a crown newly made for Mary. Gardiner crowned Mary three times. He gave her a ring for her "marrying finger" and the Master of the Jewelhouse brought a pair of bracelets set with precious stones and pearls. The noblemen now put on their caps and coronets, which they had carried into the church.

Gardiner and the earls made homage to Mary. Mass was celebrated while Mary remained kneeling. She held the royal sceptre, which had been carried by the Earl of Arundel, and the consort's sceptre which was topped with a dove. She entered the curtained traverse and reappeared in her coronation robe, carrying the sceptre and monde or orb. The ceremony in the Abbey was then complete and had lasted until nearly four or five o'clock.

== Banquet in Westminster Hall ==
After the ceremonies, there was a banquet in Westminster Hall. According to the diplomat Simon Renard, Mary sat in the Coronation Chair with the Stone of Scone in the hall and rested her feet on two of her ladies in waiting. This may reflect Renard's understanding of the physical marble king or queen's bench in the hall. Anne of Cleves and Elizabeth sat at the top table with Mary.

The Earl of Derby, as High Steward of England, and the Duke of Norfolk, as Earl Marshal, rode into the hall on courser horses. Mary sat under a cloth of estate. During the feast four swords were held before her. Her first drink was served by Sir Giles Alington. Mary of Hungary sent wild boar meat from Flanders for the banquet.

=== The champion ===
The Queen's Champion, Edward Dymoke, rode into the hall in full armour. He threw down a glove and offered to challenge any who questioned Mary's right to rule. No one took up the challenge, and he declared Mary "the true and rightful Queen of that Kingdom".

Dymoke's fee was a gold cup, which Mary passed to him filled with wine. He was also given the horse and armour, 18 yards of crimson satin for livery clothes, and the food allowance of a baron. Dymoke made a claim in November for a few weapons and a pair of gilt spurs which he had not yet received.

=== Proclamation ===
The Garter Herald, Gilbert Dethick, proclaimed Mary as Queen in Latin, French and English. There was a cry of "Largesse". At the conclusion of the meal, hypocras and wafers were served, a final course known as a void. Mary washed her hands, and stood on the step known as the "hault place" with Elizabeth and Anne of Cleves. The Mayor of London brought a drink in a gold cup, which Mary tasted, and then gave the cup to the Mayor.

== Costume ==
Details of fabrics bought or supplied for the coronation are known from records of the royal wardrobe and Mary's warrants or orders. There is also a list of fabrics and items with the order of ceremony prepared by the wardrobe. Mary ordered velvet from Arthur Stourton, keeper of the wardrobe at Westminster. The Queen's silkwoman, Marie Wilkinson, was paid £200 in September 1553 by order of the Privy Council. Chronicle accounts and diplomatic dispatches also describe some textiles and costume. The costume historian Janet Arnold published some of the wardrobe documents.

The ambassador Noailles wrote in August that Mary had put aside a "superstition" of the court of Edward VI and now her women wore brightly coloured clothes and jewellery, with wide sleeves in the French fashion. In 1554, a Venetian diplomat, Giacomo Soranzo, reported that Mary, on state occasions, wore a gown and bodice, with wide hanging sleeves in the French fashion. The wardrobe accounts record that her tailor, Edward Jones, made French-style gowns and kirtles and round farthingales for her in 1553.

A Genoese merchant wrote that Lady Jane Grey had worn green and white in July 1553, Tudor colours asserting her right to rule. The variety of sources, and changes of costume made during the ceremony, has led to some confusion over the use of fabrics and colour, and consequent symbolism. Crimson was a traditional colour for the coronation of English monarchs. At the height of the ceremony, Mary changed into purple, a colour referenced by the writer John Seton.

Two squires of honour at the Entry and coronation wore mantles of crimson velvet, worn baldric-wise off the shoulder, and hats of crimson tissue. They represented the Duchy of Gascony and Guyenne. Described in narratives as gentlemen wearing ducal robes, their presence represented Mary's claim to these territories. At the coronation of Edward VI these roles had been performed by two Gentleman Ushers, John Norris and William Rainsford. Their hats and costume, as described at the coronation of Anne Boleyn, were deliberately old-fashioned in style.

According to a chronicle, Mary wore a gown of blue velvet lined with powdered ermine on her way to the Abbey. She owned a blue velvet gown at this time. Other accounts say that she wore her Parliament robes of crimson velvet. A manuscript listing her clothes for the day gives other details, and says that she wore her "common usual apparel" to go to her coronation at Westminster on the second day beneath her Parliament robes. Her collar was decorated with passamayne lace of Venice gold. Passamayne was a kind of braid or woven lace, used as edging on garments or on the borders of skirts.

=== Blue and ray cloth ===
The route from Westminster Hall into the Abbey was spread with blue velvet or multi-coloured woollen "ray-cloth". The wardrobe account says the blue cloth was used between the hall and the Abbey quire door. The pulpit was draped with red worsted.

The use of ray cloth on the route of the procession was traditional. The cloth used at the coronation of Anne Boleyn was described as "blue ray cloth". At the coronation of Elizabeth of York on 25 November 1487, spectators rushed to cut pieces of the ray cloth with knives before her ladies had even finished passing by. As the souvenir hunters struggled with each other there were fatalities.

=== Anointing and a change of costume ===
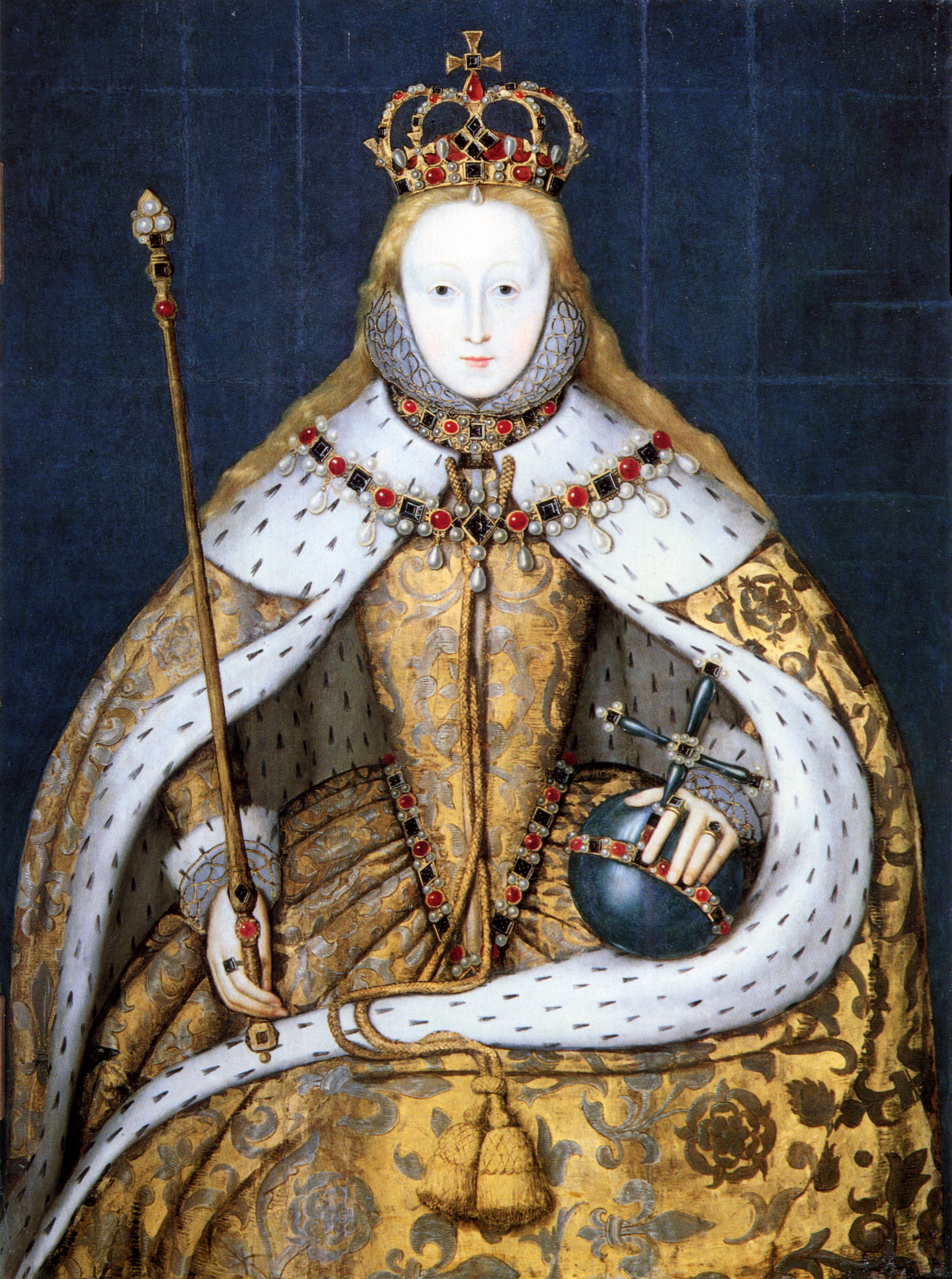
Elizabeth I used some of Mary's coronation clothes at her coronation in 1559

During the ceremony Mary withdrew into a traverse, a curtained space, using for robing and disrobing. There she changed into a purple velvet mantle, and a purple velvet kirtle with a train furred with ermine, assisted by her ladies in waiting. Mary was partly undressed for her anointing, during which she wore the Colobium Sindonis of silk taffeta. The newly made silk garment was described as a "tabard of white tarteryn", like that used at the coronation of her parents Henry VIII and Catherine of Aragon in 1509, or of white "sarsenet", worn over her gown. After the anointing, she put on a purple velvet kirtle. Mistress Walgrave, (the wife of Edward Waldegrave), laced up her clothes, and Mary put on a mantle again. Lace with tags were provided for the kirtles and 24 yards of ribbon for girdles. Walgrave also handed linen gloves to the queen. Her shoes were "sabatons" of crimson cloth of gold lined with satin and dressed with Venice gold ribbon or gold passamyne lace. The costume change was detailed in a schedule which describes this specially made "coronation mantle" and its lacework overmantle. This second mantle was mentioned in the published Spanish narrative accounts.

Mary paid for the making of these new items furred with ermine and decorated with Venice gold lace, including the coronation mantle, from her own purse. The earls and countesses in attendance wore crimson velvet and gold coronets.

=== Gentlewomen and chamberers ===
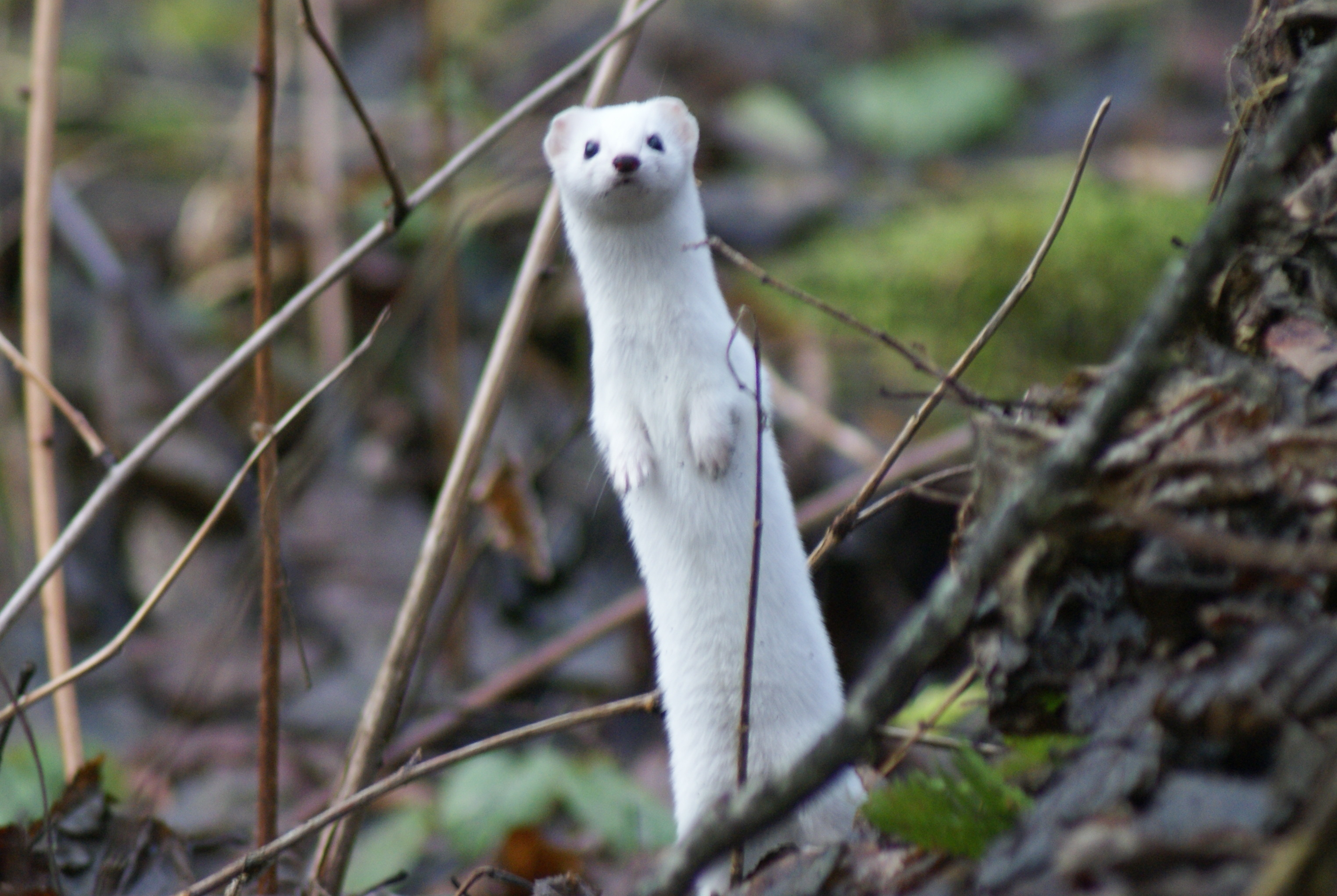
Some of Mary's gentlewomen and chamberers wore scarlet cloth gowns trimmed with "lettice", the winter fur of a weasel

The ladies of Mary's household were dressed in three kinds of fabric, according to status, having at the Royal Entry crimson damask, satin, and velvet. Noailles explains that these red fabrics were used for their horse mantles or cloths, and their gowns at the entry were silver and gold. The English chronicles mention the red fabrics only, Holinshed says the clothes of the riders, gentlewomen and maids, at the Entry and their caparisons were of crimson satin or velvet. The differences between the accounts were first noted by James Planché, writing in 1838.

Wardrobe accounts mention crimson velvet and crimson satin gowns for women for the eve of the Coronation, and for the Coronation day. Rhys Mansel bequeathed Lady Mansel's crimson velvet gown to her daughter, Mary. At the coronation, according to the French ambassador Noailles, the three grades of cloth worn were scarlet (a woollen cloth), satin, and crimson velvet. Another narrative says her majesty's ladies in great numbers wore scarlet in the Abbey. An inventory of jewels mentions that twenty pairs of gold billiments (for head dresses), of sundry fashions, were issued to the ladies and gentlewomen, including Mistress Anne Poyntz née Sibelles. She was mother of the maids and the widow of John Poyntz of North Ockendon. Her granddaughter Anne Astley joined her at court.

Costumes for gentlewomen and servants were ordered with a royal warrant dated 25 September. Scarlet gowns furred with "lettice" fur were made "against our coronation" for Susan Clarencieux, Mrs Jerningham (Elizabeth Jerningham, or her niece, later Mary Southwell), Mary Finch, Mistress Jane Russell, Mistress Elizabeth Golbourne, Sibilla Penne (a former nurse of Edward VI), and Mistress Sydney (a sister of Henry Sidney). Lettice is a grey weasel fur. The historian John Strype described some members of this group as chamberers and provided a slightly different list of names and ranking, for the riders at the Entry. He includes Jane Dormer and Jane Russell. Further wardrobe records show that Jane Russell (died 1558) was a chamberer at the coronation and was later a gentlewoman of Mary's privy chamber. She was the wife of William Russell, Sergeant of the Wine Cellar, and was to be rewarded for her advocacy of Mary's marriage. Elizabeth Golbourne married William Babington of Kiddington and continued as a chamberer.

The September warrant also included clothes for Elizabeth, for "our dear and entirely beloved cousin the Lady Clifford", and the "Lady Marquess of Devonshire" (the Marchioness of Exeter), with costumes of tinsel for Will Somers and "Jane our woman foole". It is not clear if costume ordered for Jane at this time was intended for wearing at the coronation. Jane and Lucretia, a tumbler, had been members of Mary's household in 1542.

=== Reuse of coronation clothes by Elizabeth I ===
Several details of Mary's costume, the vocabulary used for fabrics, and the costume changes of Mary's coronation follow closely the order of her parents' coronation in 1509. When Elizabeth I was crowned in 1559, she reused some of Mary's clothes, which were altered by the tailor Walter Fyshe.

The costume historian Janet Arnold described how items in Elizabeth's inventory correspond with those in Mary's coronation wardrobe accounts, including the cloth of gold and silver mantle and a matching kirtle trimmed with ermine used at the Royal Entry, and the purple velvet mantle, kirtle and surcoat worn in the Abbey after the anointing. One of the documents from 1553 describes the "mantle and kirtle of white cloth of silver, the mantle of estate with a long train, furred through all with powdered ermines and a mantellace of white silk and gold, a kirtle of the same" and the "kirtle of purple velvet with a train, the train furred with ermines, edged about the skirt ... a mantle of the same called a coronation mantle with a long train". These garments may not have been newly-made for Mary's coronation, as records mention enlarging a gown.

Some of Mary's gowns remained in Elizabeth's wardrobe and were detailed in inventories, including purple gowns and one of crimson satin sewed with pearls and garnets. It was not recorded if any of these were used at Mary's coronation. It has been suggested that Mary wore the crimson satin gown with pearls at her Winchester wedding to Philip of Spain. Elizabeth also used some of Mary's clothes in court drama. A wardrobe book records that a purple velvet forequarter of a gown that had belonged to Mary was lost during the staging of a play at Oxford.
