= Sybil Penn =

English courtier

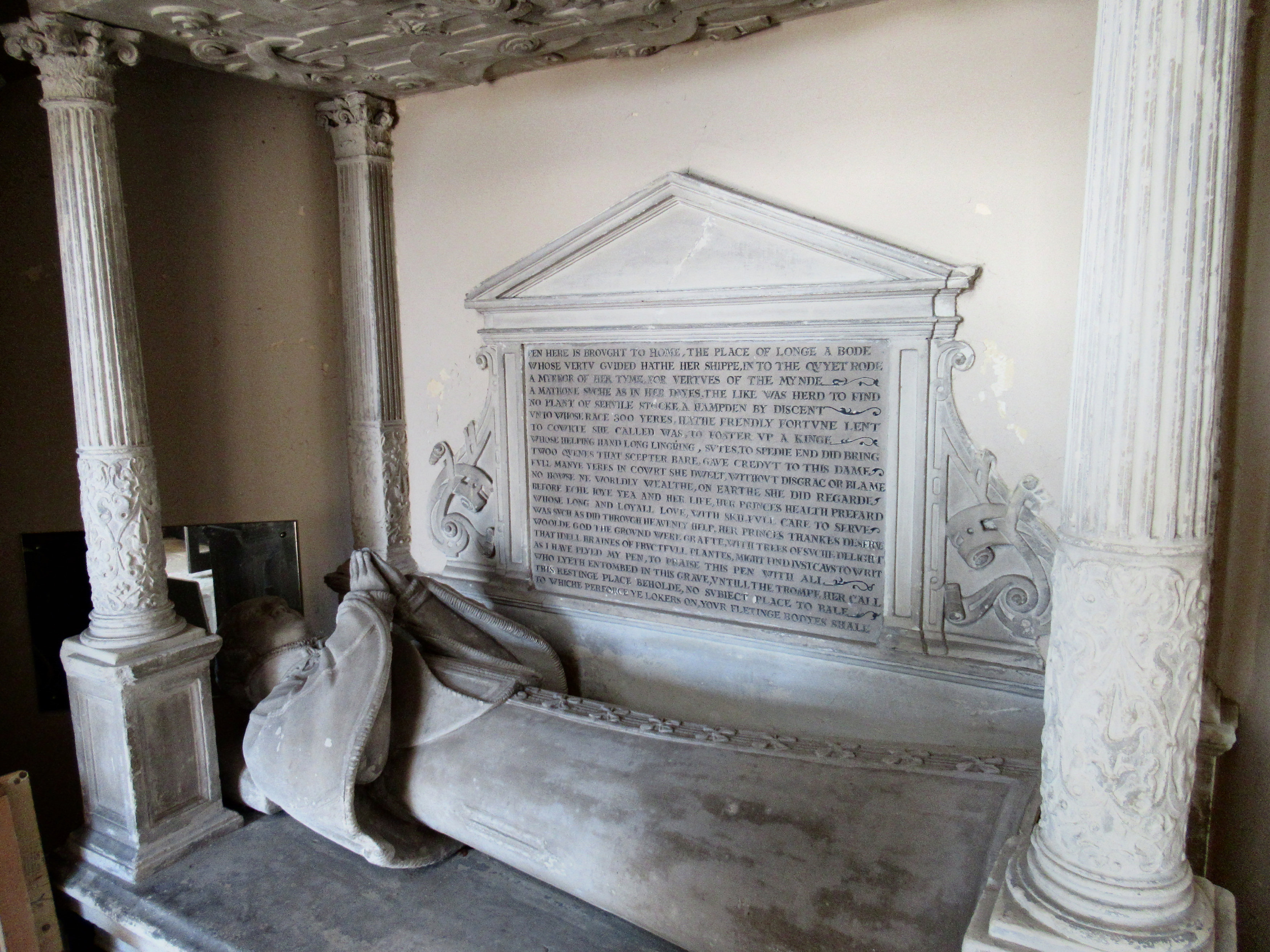
Effigy and epitaph of Sybil Penn, St Mary's Hampton

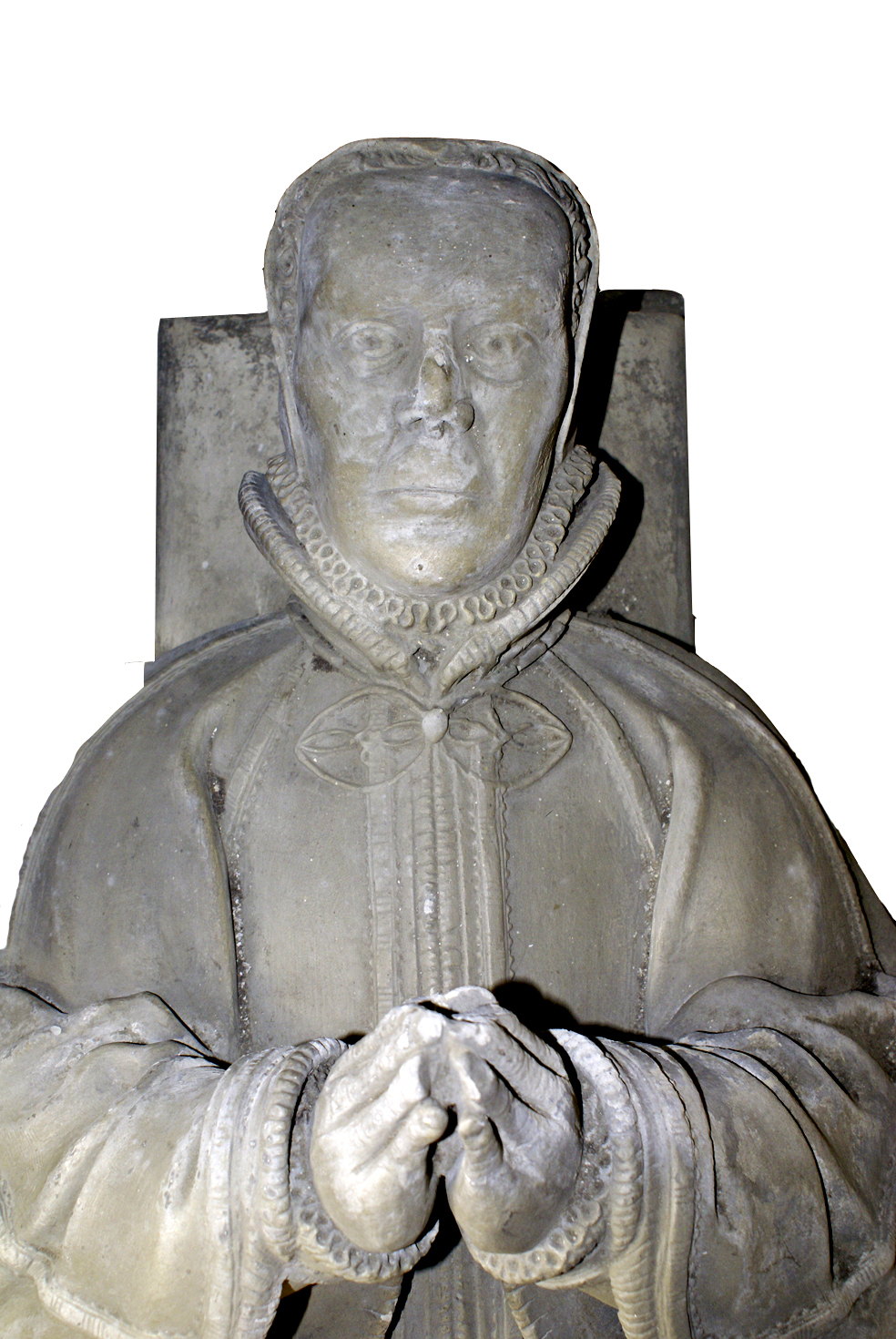
Effigy of Sybil Penn, St Mary's Hampton.

Sybil or Sibel Penn (died 1562) was an English courtier. Her roles at court included nurse and teacher to King Edward VI and Lady of the Bed Chamber to his sisters, Queens Mary I and Elizabeth I.

== Family background ==
She was a daughter of William Hampden of the Hill and his wife Audrey Hampden, an heiress of Kimble. Her aunt, Sibill Hampden, married Thomas Hawtrey, whose son William Hawtrey (died 1597), was custodian of Lady Mary Grey at Chequers in 1565.

The genealogical detail of her family is variously reported. Her brothers were Richard Hampden of Dunton and Missenden Abbey, Clerk of the Kitchen to Elizabeth I, Griffith Hampden (MP), who entertained Queen Elizabeth at Hampden House, and William Hampden, who married Elizabeth Cromwell, and was the father of John Hampden. Sybil Penn married David Penn, of Penn in Buckinghamshire.

== Career ==
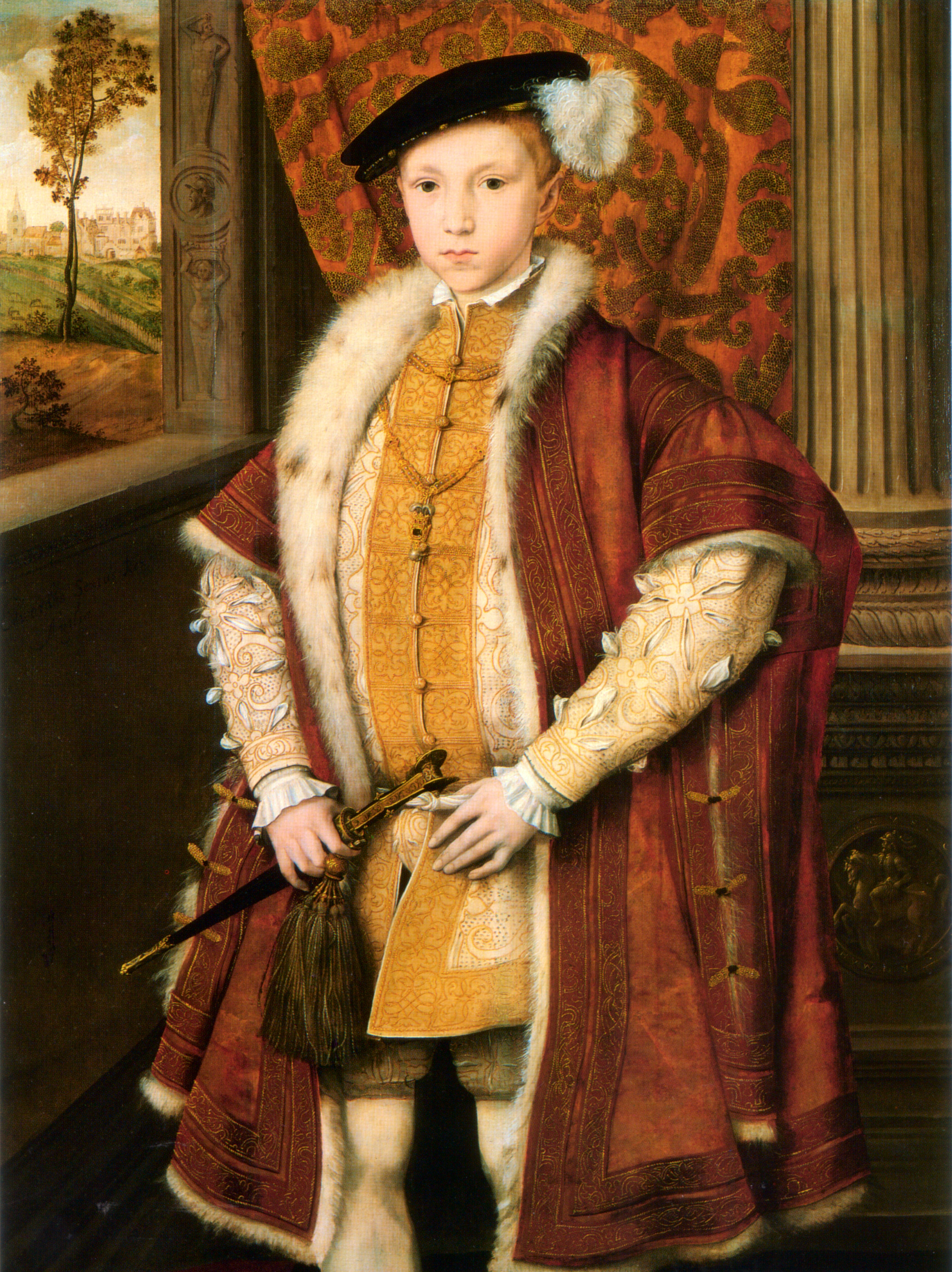
Edward VI with a view of Hunsdon House, attributed to William Scrots, Royal Collection.

Penn was appointed Mistress Nurse to Prince Edward, the son of Henry VIII and Jane Seymour, probably as a "dry nurse" in October 1538. When she was nurse to Prince Edward, according to family tradition, Henry VIII gave her a pearl necklace, which survives.

Princess Mary gave a gift of £30 to Edward's nursery staff and the midwife Agnes Baltrop or Balthrop at Edward's christening at Hampton Court (perhaps before Penn's appointment), and in 1540 she gave gilt spoons to the four ladies employed to rock the cradle. As a New Year's Day gift for 1538, Mary gave the "Mistress Nurse to the Prince" a bonnet. Later, Mary gave a gold brooch depicting Saint George to the Mistress Nurse's daughter, perhaps her namesake Mary Penn. Mary also gave clothes to Blanche Milborne, known as "Lady Troy", who was involved in Edward's care. Agnes Balthrop's son Robert Balthrop (1522–1591) became a barber surgeon to Queen Elizabeth.

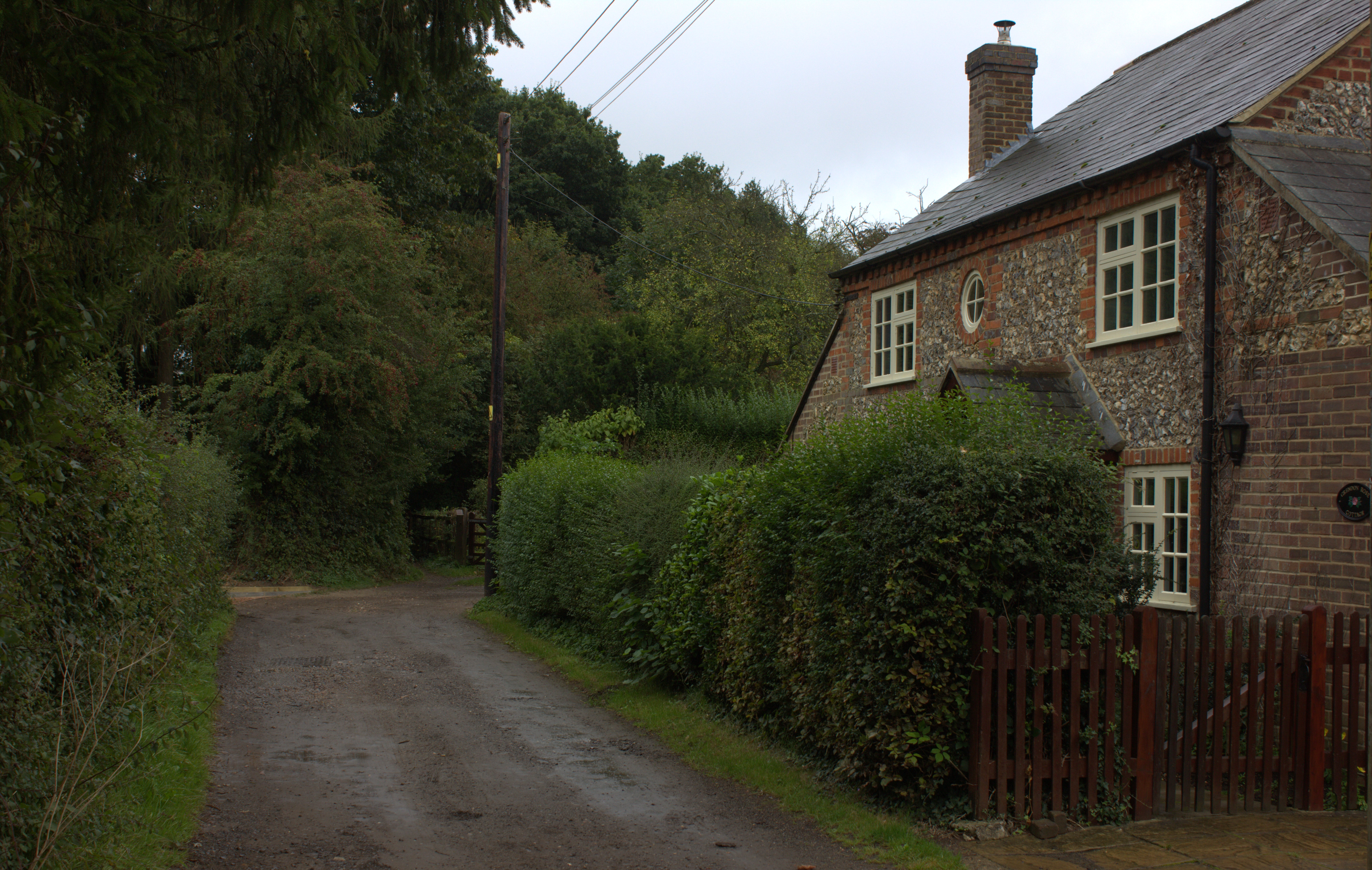
Beamond at Little Missenden was among the former properties of Godstow Abbey given to Sibyl Penn

Sybil Penn wrote a letter of recommendation to Thomas Cromwell for her brother-in-law Griffith Richards (husband of Audrey Hampden), in the hope that he would also be employed in the service of Prince Edward. She wrote to Cromwell again in 1539 or 1540, from Hunsdon House one of Edward's residences, asking for the lease of Missenden Abbey, in response to Cromwell's promise to do her "some good". In 1553, Edward VI rewarded "Sibella Penne" with two manors, Aufries (Affricks) and Beamond, and other property in Little Missenden, confirming a grant of 1541, for her work as a nurse and educator.

In the records of New Year's Day gifts known as "Gift Rolls", it was noted that Edward VI gave "maistres Penn in Bukinghamshire" a reward of 10 shillings. In the reign of Mary I, "Mrs Penn", the former nurse, gave half a dozen handkerchiefs edged with gold passamyne lace in 1556. The gift rolls also mention [Lucy Chevall] Mrs Barlee alias Penne, the widow of Henry VIII's barber John Penne, and heiress of Codicote. A drawing by Hans Holbein is labelled "Mother Jak, King Edward's nurse". The identity of this person is unclear, and possibly "Mrs Jak" was a nickname for Sybil Penne or another worker in the Prince's household. Juliana or Julian Penne, the mother of Michael Hicks and Baptist Hicks, and an active money lender in Tudor court circles, has been confused with Sybil Penne.

== Mary I ==
Sibyl Penn rode in Mary I's Royal Entry on 30 September, and attended the Mary's coronation on 1 October 1553, wearing a scarlet gown furred with "lettice" fur. Other ladies and chamberers given this costume included Susan Clarencieux, Mrs Jerningham (Elizabeth Jerningham, or her niece, later Mary Southwell), Mary Finch, Mistress Russell, Mistress Golborne, and Mistress Sydney (a relation or the wife of Henry Sidney). Lettice is a grey weasel fur.

Penn also attended Mary's funeral on 14 December 1558. In the procession, she rode in a chariot or carriage with Susan Clarencieux, Mistress Tynnes, and Mistress Southwell. They wore morning clothes with "barbes" (veils) under their chins.

== Smallpox and the Sidney connection ==
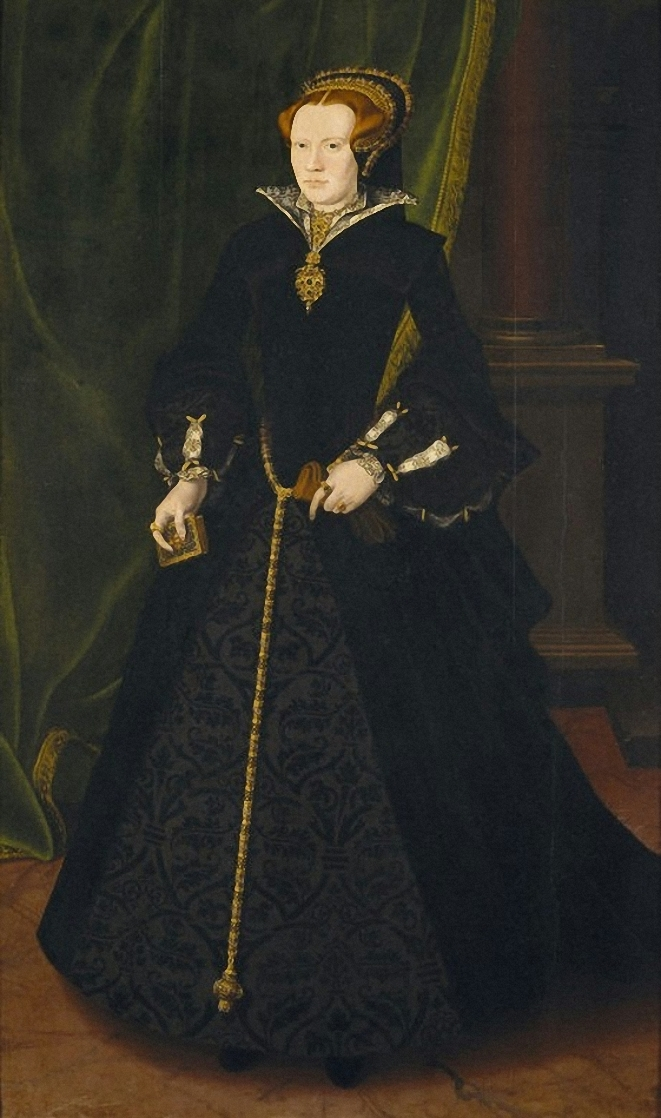
Mary Sidney, by Hans Eworth. Sidney attended the coronation of Mary I with Sybil Penn, and they both caught smallpox in October 1562

As a New Year's Day gift in January 1562, "Mrs Penne" gave Elizabeth I a pair of "silk knytt hose". These were perhaps knitted silk stockings.

Sybil Penn died on 6 November 1562, probably from an outbreak of smallpox at this time. Queen Elizabeth and Mary Sidney were seriously ill but recovered. Elizabeth was ill at Hampton Court between 10 and 20 October. William Cecil noted the queen's illness under the date 4 October 1562.

Historians seem to have been confused about Mrs Penn's identity due to letters of recommendation to Cromwell from William Sidney on behalf of members of the Sidney family hoping to serve in Edward's household. Mary Sidney's husband Henry Sidney later wrote that his mother (Anne Pakenham d. 1544) had been Prince Edward's governess, a near kinswoman his nurse, and a maternal aunt had been Edward's "dry nurse", in the years when the prince "remained in woman's government" before starting with a schoolmaster. Sybill Penn may have been the maternal aunt described as the "dry nurse", invited to serve in the prince's household as a connection of William Sidney.

Mary Sidney gave Elizabeth a pelican jewel as a New Year's Day gift in 1573, possibly as a reproach for Elizabeth's perceived ingratitude for nursing her in 1562 when she had smallpox. Elizabeth, apparently indifferent to this gesture, soon gave the pelican brooch to Sidney's sister, the Countess of Huntingdon.

== Monument at St Mary's Hampton ==
Penn was buried at St Mary's Hampton, Middlesex, where there is a monument. The rhyming epitaph declares, referring to the death of Jane Seymour and Penn's employment by Mary and Elizabeth, "To court she called was, to foster up a king ... Two queens that sceptre bore gave credit to this dame".

== Hampton Court ghost story ==
Sibyl Penn's monument was moved when the church was rebuilt in 1829, and this gave rise to a ghost story. It was said the noise of spinning wheel was heard at nearby Hampton Court and that soon afterwards the Board of Works found a closed-up room with a spinning wheel. The story of Sybil Penn as the "Grey Lady" haunting Hampton Court continues to be told.

Sybil Penn's body was not found buried under the monument in 1829, but only, according to one report, a hair-pin and some hair. The body had been moved soon after burial at Hampton to the chancel of Holy Trinity, Penn, following the instructions in her husband's will.

== Family ==
Sybil married David Penn or Penne. Their children included:

- John Penn, who married Ursula Walliston.
- Mary Penn, who married George Peckham.
- Margaret Penn, who married Thomas Gifford of Middle Claydon, her father bequeathed her the apparel worn by Sybil Penn at court.
- Edward Penn.
- Thomas Penn
