= Robert Strelley =

16th-century English politician

Robert Strelley (by 1518 – 23 January 1554), of Great Bowden, Leicestershire, was an English politician, soldier, and courtier to Mary I of England.

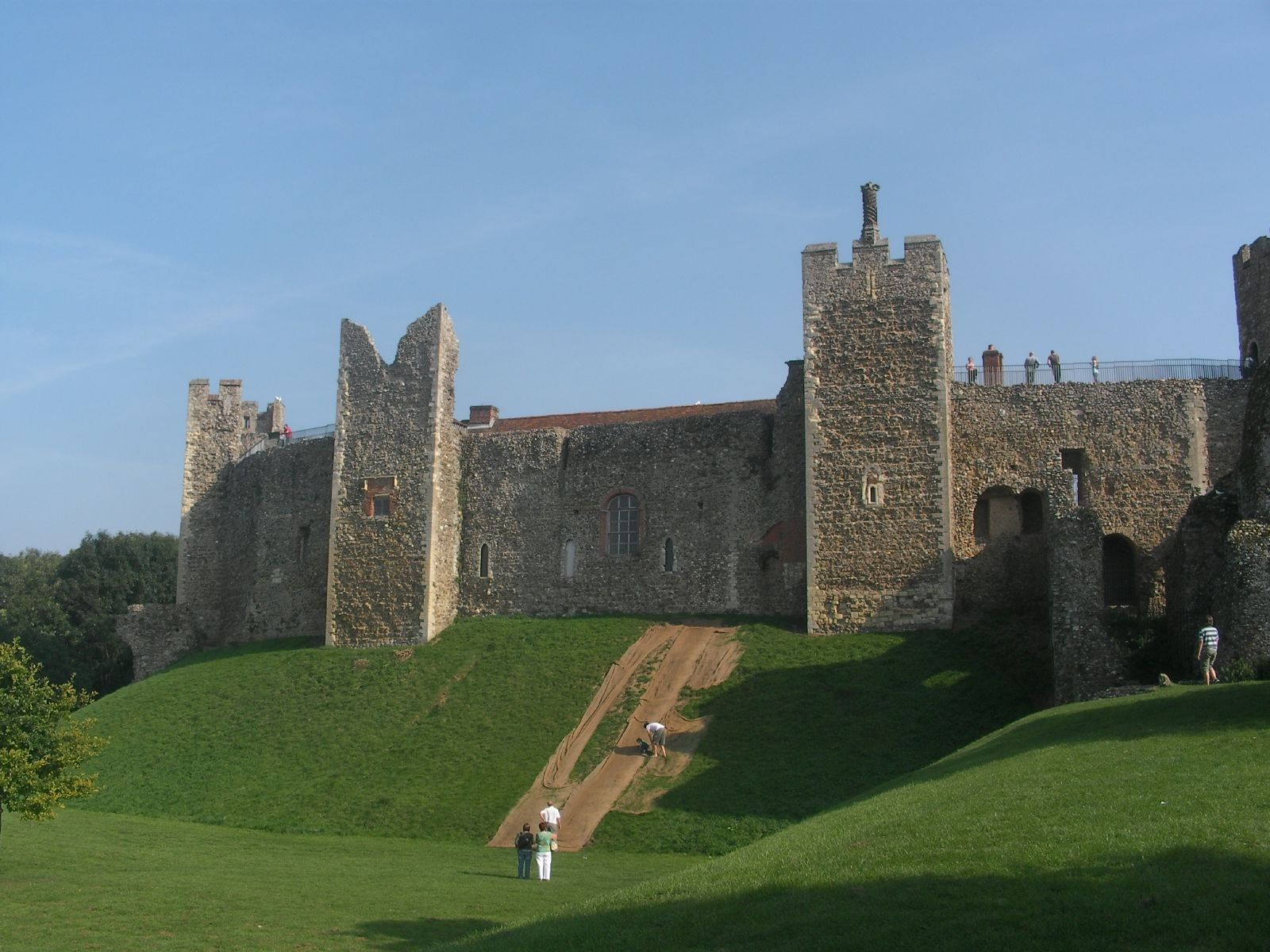
Robert Strelley was with Mary I of England at Framlingham Castle in July 1553.

He was a Member (MP) of the Parliament of England for Leicestershire in October 1553.

Strelley fought with Thomas Howard, 3rd Duke of Norfolk at the siege of Montreuil in 1544, and in Scotland, probably at the battle of Pinkie. He was a gentleman in the household of Princess Mary by 1549, He was with her at Kenninghall, where Mary I made him a member of her Privy Council, and at Framlingham Castle in July 1553, where she mustered an army of supporters. Robert Wingfield listed him, as a man "whose family was not obscure", in a catalogue of Mary's supporters.

Robert Strelley served as a Chamberlain of the Exchequer from 1553 until his death the following year. In 1548, he married Frideswide Knight, Frideswide Strelley was a daughter of John or Leonard Knight, of South Duffield in the parish of Hemingbrough, and his wife Isabella Langholme. Edward VI gave the couple property and a fee-farm rent income from the lands of Egglestone Abbey.

Strelley came from an extended family, and was a son either of Sir Nicholas Strelley of Linby or Sir Nicholas Strelley of Strelley. His will mentions a brother, also called Robert Strelley, who was a goldsmith in London, and two more brothers, John Strelley of London and Robert Strelley of Tirlington, a sister Joan Porter, a nephew William Saville, and a niece Elizabeth Stubbs. His property passed initially to his wife, Frideswide Strelley, and then by entail to the various relations named in the will.

Robert Strelley made his will in January 1554. Among the executors were Susan Clarencieux, who also a witness, and Richard Freeston, cofferer of the Queen's household. He died on 23 January 1554.
