= Egglestone Abbey =

Ruined Medieval Abbey in County Durham, England

Coordinates: 54.53114°N 1.90725°W

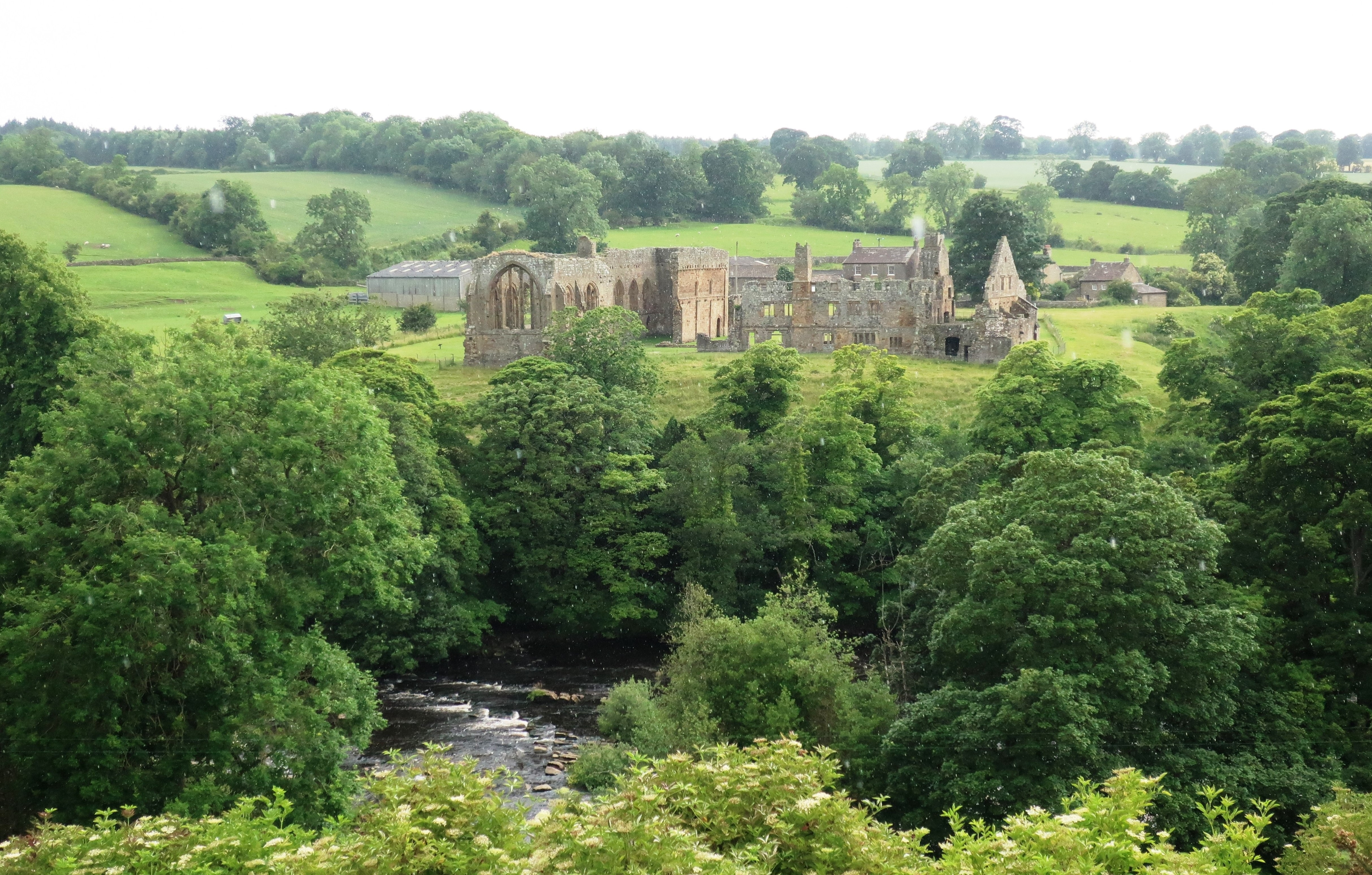
- Ruins of Egglestone Abbey from the north, with the River Tees visible in the foreground
- Interactive map of Egglestone Abbey

Monastery information
- Order: Premonstratensian
- Established: 1168–1198
- Disestablished: 1540

People
- Founder: Ralph Multon?

Site
- Location: near Barnard Castle
- Grid reference: NZ061151
- Public access: Yes
- Other information: English Heritage

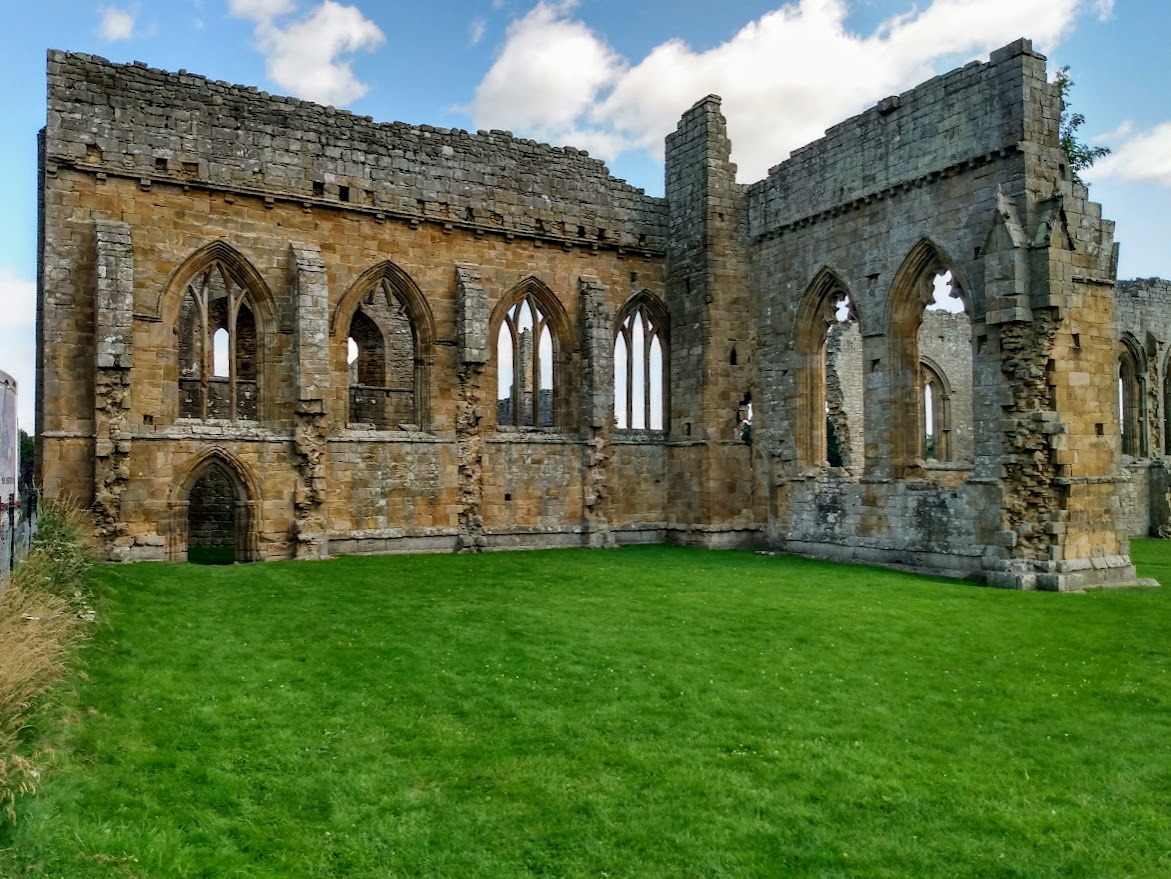
Ruins of the abbey church.

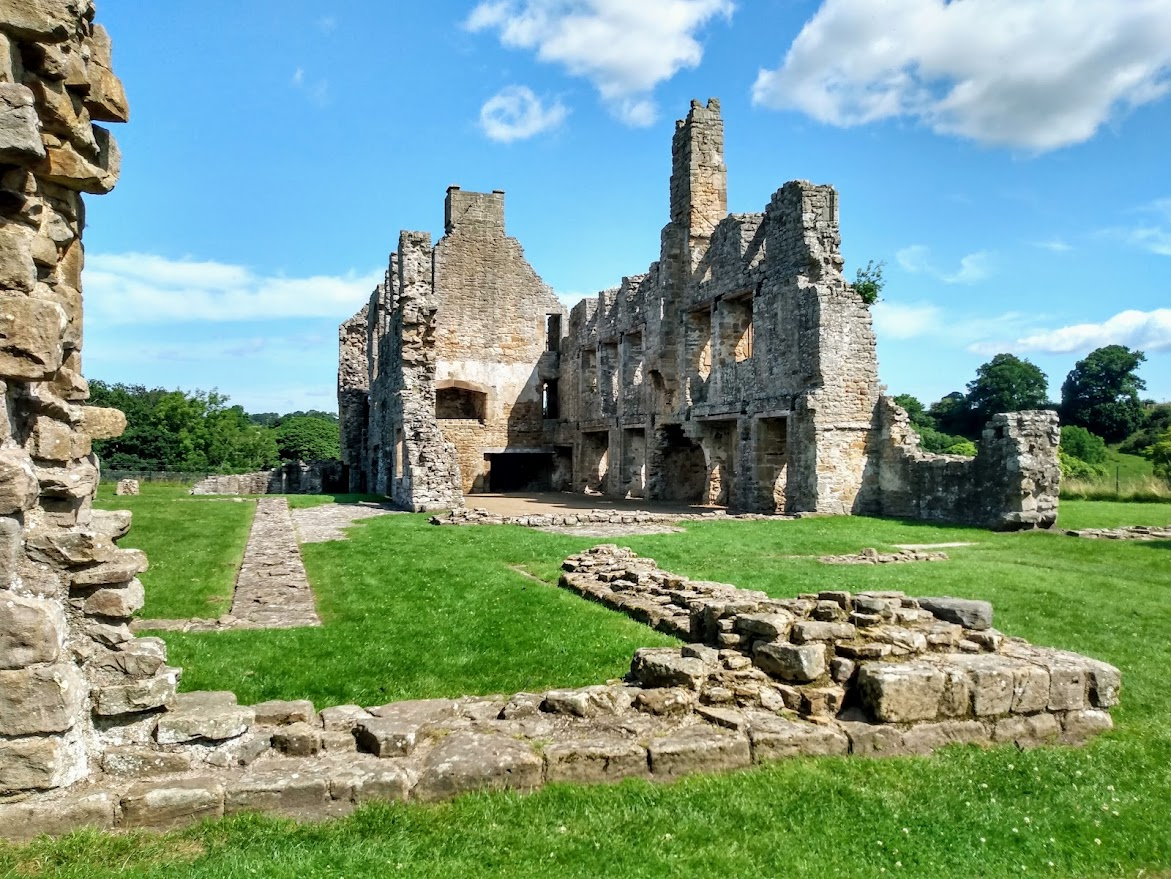
The abbey's dayroom, with the dormitory on the first floor.

Egglestone Abbey is a ruined Premonstratensian abbey in County Durham, England. It is 1 1/2 miles (2.4 km) southeast of Barnard Castle, on the south bank of the River Tees, and was historically within the North Riding of Yorkshire.

The site buildings are protected as a Scheduled Ancient Monument and maintained by English Heritage; admission is free.

== History ==
The Abbey was founded in the late 12th century at some point between 1168 and 1198 most likely by a member of the Multon family; the oldest document about the abbey dated to 1198 mentions a fine by the overlord Ralph Lenham to Ralph Multon in regard to alienated land. The founders were the Premonstratensians who wore a white habit and became known as the White Canons. They followed a code of austerity similar to that of Cistercian monks, unlike monks of other orders, they were exempt from the strict Episcopal discipline. They undertook preaching and pastoral work in the region (such as distributing meat and drink). They chose the site for the abbey because of its isolation, close proximity to a river and the supply of local stone for its construction.

In common with many early monasteries, the original church at Egglestone Abbey was enlarged, and partly rebuilt, about one hundred years later. It is this later church that survives today.

The abbey was always poor and at times had difficulty maintaining the required number of canons (twelve – from the Twelve Apostles).

Egglestone Abbey was to suffer at the hands of Scottish invaders and the rowdy English army who were billeted there in 1346 on their way to the Battle of Neville's Cross outside Durham.

The Abbey was dissolved in 1540 by King Henry VIII. The lands were granted in 1548 to Robert Strelley, who converted some of the buildings into a great private house that was abandoned in the mid-19th century.

Eventually, much of the abbey was pulled down and some of the stonework was used to pave the stable yard at the nearby Rokeby Park in the 19th century. The ruins were Grade I listed in 1987.

== See also ==
Other Premonstratensian Abbeys include:

- Shap Abbey in Cumbria
- Easby Abbey in North Yorkshire
