= Mary Finch =

English courtier

Mary Finch or Fynche (1508-1557) was an English courtier of Mary I of England.

== Career ==
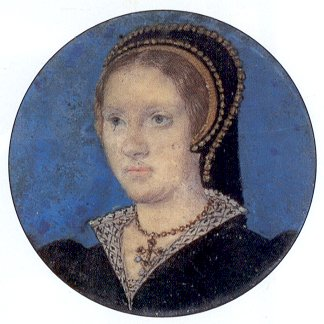
Princess Mary, formerly said to be Catherine Parr, wearing a diamond cross with pendant pearls, attributed to Susannah Horenbout, displayed at Compton Verney.

She was a daughter of Christopher Kempe (1485-1512) and Mary Guildford (1486-1529), a daughter of Richard Guildford and Anne Pympe. Her mother married secondly William Hawte of Bishopsbourne (died 1539), a grandson of William Hawte. Mary Finch was a half-sister of Jane Hawte who married Thomas Wyatt the Younger.

She married Lawrence Finch of the Mote. He was a son of William Finch and Elizabeth Cromer. His brother Thomas Finch of Eastwell was Member of Parliament for Canterbury.

Mary Finch kept Princess Mary's privy purse accounts in the 1540s and was the keeper of her jewels. Finch kept an inventory of Mary's jewels for the years 1542 to 1546, and this was published in 1831 by Frederic Madden. Henry VIII gave Mary jewels which may include a diamond cross depicted in her portraits. The jewel inventory notes pieces which Princess Mary gave as gifts. Mary gave Finch a little gold chain decorated with black enamel. Mary gave a gold brooch with a balas ruby depicting the story of Susannah and the Elders, and another with the History of David, to Margaret Douglas.

Mary Finch became a lady of Queen Mary's privy chamber, and rode on horseback with other women dressed in crimson velvet in her coronation procession. In 1557 she gave the queen a red satin purse containing twelve gold half sovereign coins as a New Years Day gift.

She was buried on 20 September 1557 at the Savoy Chapel. Henry Machyn noted in his Diary that Mistress Finch was "one of the privy chamber to the Queen".

She bequeathed a pair of gold bracelets, and left money to make 25 memento mori rings with "the figure of death's head in every of them" for her friends at court, including the Countess of Kildare, Mary Bassett, Susan Clarencieux, and Jane Dormer.
