= Scarlet (cloth) =

Luxury fulled, napped, and sheared woolen textile of the Middle Ages

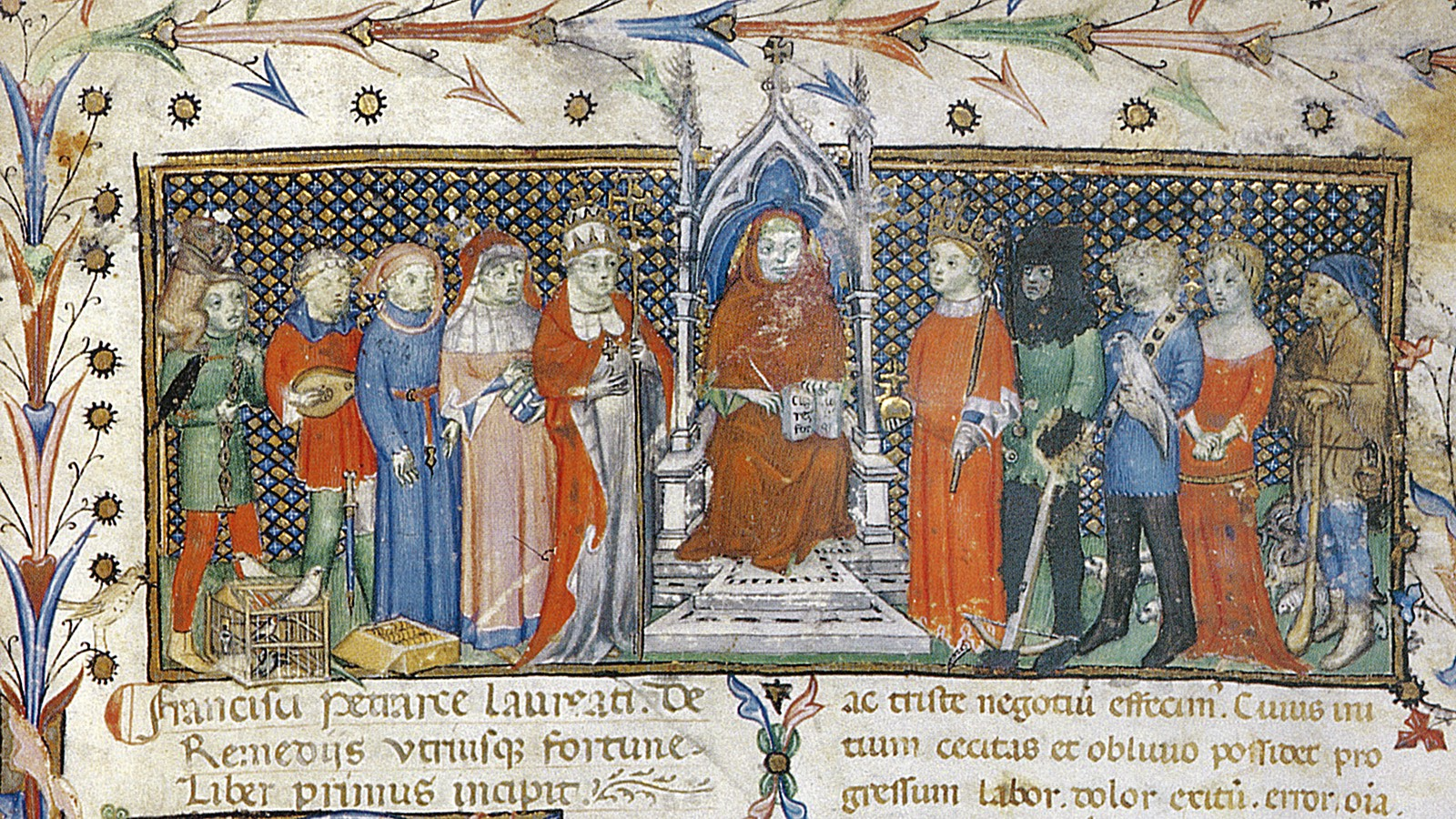
Illustration of social classes, italy, c. 1400. It would be characteristic that the king (right of centre) and bishop (left of centre) were dressed in scarlet.

Scarlet was a type of fine and expensive woollen cloth common in Medieval Europe. In the assessment of John Munro, 'the medieval scarlet was therefore a very high-priced, luxury, woollen broadcloth, invariably woven from the finest English wools, and always dyed with the red dye kermes, even if mixed with woad, and other dyestuffs. There is no evidence for the use of the term scarlet for any other textile, even though other textiles, especially silks, were also dyed with kermes.'

== Characteristics ==
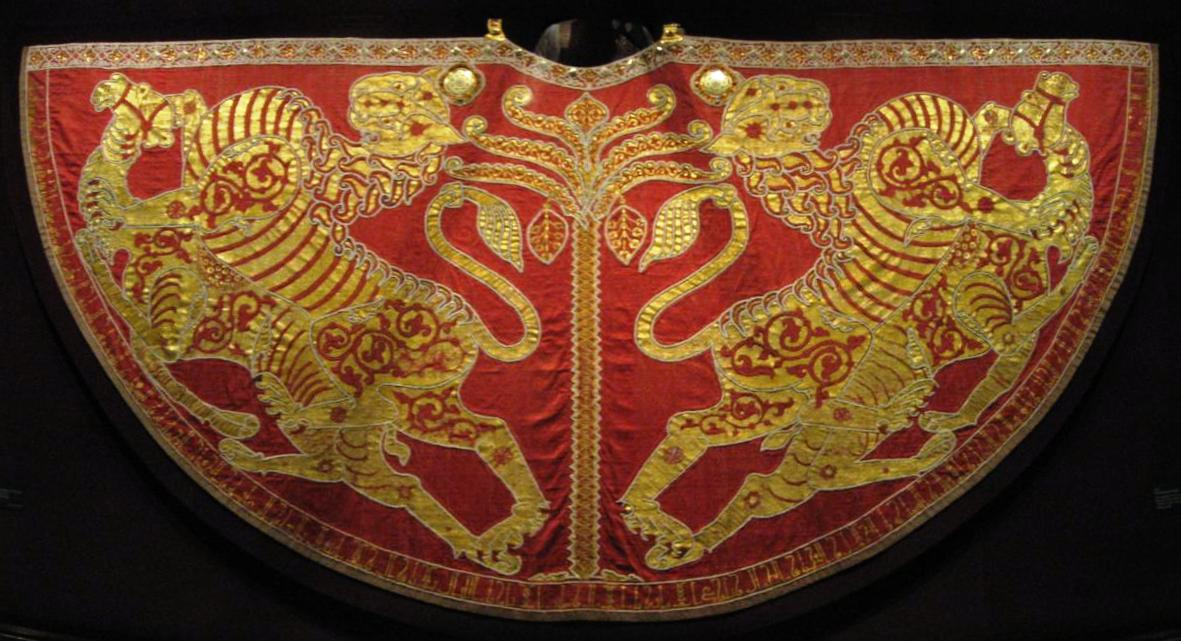
The Coronation Mantle of Roger II of Sicily, silk dyed with kermes and embroidered with gold thread and pearls. This kind of cloth seems to have been denoted by the Arabic siklāt. Royal Workshop, Palermo, Sicily, 1133–34. Kunsthistorisches Museum, Vienna.

The origins of the word "scarlet" have been debated quite extensively and are crucial to understanding what scarlet actually was in the Middle Ages. The word certainly came to English from Old French escarlate, which is one of a wide range of similar words in the Romance languages such as Provençal escarlat, Spanish escarlata, Portuguese escarlate, Italian scarlatto, and medieval Latin scarlat(t)um. The origin of this romance word, however, has been more widely debated. For a long time the origin was thought to be a Persian word which takes forms like saqalāt, siqalāt, or suqlāt. However, the romance word is now thought to come from Arabic siklāt (plural siklātūn), denoting very expensive, luxury silks dyed scarlet-red using the exceptionally expensive dye kermes. Arabic siklāt is first attested around the ninth century, and now thought also to be the origin of the Persian word, which is first attested around the 1290s. The origin of the word siklāt is itself uncertain and may come from the Late Roman term sigillatus (Latin)/σιγιλλατον (Greek), denoting a kind of cloth decorated with seal-like patterns (from Latin sigillum 'seal'). The word then came to be used of woollen cloth dyed with the same dye. The most obvious route for the Arabic word siklāt to have entered the Romance languages would be via the Arabic-speaking Iberian region of Al-Andalus, particularly Almería, where kermes was produced extensively.

Recent work has discredited an alternative suggestion that the word scarlet originated in the Germanic languages. Henri Pirenne, in an argument elaborated by Jean-Baptiste Weckerlin, argued that the term scarlet originated in the Germanic words related to Dutch schar ('shear') and laken ('cloth'), in which case scarlet was originally highly sheared cloth. They argued that the word spread from Germanic to other European languages due to the dominance of the Low Countries in the medieval wool trade. They guessed that scarlet became associated with the colour red because this was among the most prestigious colours, and therefore most fitting for exceptionally fine cloth. However, their ideas have not proved a good fit with the full range of European evidence: most importantly, historical evidence for the production of scarlet does not indicate more extensive shearing than other cloth. It is now thought that terms like Old High German schar-lachen, Middle Low German scharlaken, and the Scandinavian derivatives (Danish skarlagen, Swedish skarlakan, Icelandic skarlak, skarlakan) originally referred to highly sheared cloth produced on the horizontal treadle loom that came into use in northern Europe around the eleventh century. Meanwhile, Germanic words like Old Norse skarlat, Middle High German scharlât, and early modern Flemish schaerlat are all now thought to have been borrowed from the Romance words which themselves derived from Arabic siklāt.

It has long been claimed that scarlet cloth was produced in red, white, blue, green, and brown colors, among others, with carmine red being merely the most common colour. However, recent work has argued that this is a misunderstanding of the use of colour-terms in medieval cloth production, and that references to other colours in scarlet production refers to their colour before dyeing with kermes.

Scarlet cloth was particularly fashionable in Europe during the fourteenth and fifteenth centuries, but fell out of fashion during the sixteenth to seventeenth.

== Appearances in popular culture ==
It is probable that the name of the character Will Scarlett in the Robin Hood legends referred to this type of cloth, similarly to the common occupational surnames (e.g. Weaver, Cooper, Fletcher, etc.).
