= Antonio de Guarás =

Spanish merchant and ambassador

Antonio de Guarás (1520–1579), was a Spanish merchant who was the ambassador of Philip II of Spain to Elizabeth I of England between 1571 and 1578.

== At the English court ==
In a letter of November 1574, Guarás wrote that he would use a cipher code like Mary, Queen of Scots, which he thought was obscure and indecipherable. He reported on the marriage of Charles Stuart and Elizabeth Cavendish which led to the imprisonment of Margaret Douglas, Countess of Lennox in the Tower of London. Guarás described walking with Elizabeth I at Richmond Palace. She asked him if her "Scottish prisoner" had sent him a painted lion as a token. Guarás became a route for Mary's communications with Don Juan.

In 1577, Guarás became involved in a scheme to replace Elizabeth I with Mary, Queen of Scots. The plot would commence with rebellion in Ireland. Guarás was arrested on 19 October. Guarás feared he would be treated as a private person rather than as a diplomat holding the Spanish king's commission. He was imprisoned for eighteen months in the Tower of London. His replacement as ambassador in London was Bernardino de Mendoza.
