= Susan Clarencieux =

16th-century English noblewoman

- Born: Susan White before 1510
- Died: 1564
- Noble family: White
- Spouse: Thomas Tonge
- Father: Richard White of Hutton, Essex
- Mother: Maud Tyrrell
- Occupation: Mistress of the Robes of Mary I of England

Susan White, known as Susan Clarencius (before 1510 – in or after 1564), was a favourite lady in waiting and longtime friend of Queen Mary I of England.

== Family ==
Susan's family, the Whites of Hutton, were a cadet branch of the White family of South Warnborough, Hampshire. According to David Loades, Susan was "probably the youngest" of the four children of Richard White of Hutton, Essex and Maud Tyrrell, the daughter of Sir William Tyrrell of Heron, Essex. She had two sisters: Mary, who first married a husband surnamed Whitehead and secondly a husband surnamed Spenser, and Joan, who married a husband surnamed Wilcocks; and a brother, Richard White, who married Margaret Strelley, the daughter of Nicholas Strelley of Strelley, Nottinghamshire, by whom he had a son, George White.

== Early career ==
At some time before 1534 she married Thomas Tonge, who on 2 June 1534 became Clarenceux King of Arms. He died less than two years later, in March 1536, naming her his sole executor and leaving her the residue of his estate. Despite the brevity of his tenure as Clarenceux King of Arms, Susan was known as Susan Clarencius for the remainder of her life. Her name appears amongst the gentlewomen as "Mistress Clarencius" in a 1539 gift roll.

She joined Princess Mary's household as a maid in waiting when Mary was sent to the Welsh Marches as heiress presumptive in 1525. She lost her position in 1533, because Mary's household was dissolved due to her refusal to acknowledge Anne Boleyn as her father's wife. When Mary's household was reinstated, after she succumbed to pressure by her father's officials in 1536, Susan returned to her service at Mary's request. By June 1536, Mary considered her a trusted servant, and their close personal relationship lasted for the remainder of Mary's life. Susan and her servant Hobbes bought New Year's Day gifts for Mary to give to her household and her supporters.

In July 1548, "Mistress Clarencius" attended the wedding of her kinswoman Anne Petre at Ingatestone Hall.

== Reign of Mary I ==
After Mary's accession to the throne in 1553, Susan Clarencius was named Mistress of the Robes. Mary of Hungary learnt of her influence with the queen, and was advised that her envoy Don Diego de Mendoza should only discuss the issue of Mary's marriage with her.

Clarencius rode through the streets of London with other ladies of the household dressed in crimson velvet at the Royal Entry before Mary's coronation. Clarencius was regarded as the queen's closest confidante and received many gifts from her, including generous grants of land in Essex, including the manors of Loverdown (Loughton Hall), Thamberley Hall, Thundersley, Runwell, Rivenhall, Chingford St Pauls, and Chingford Earls.

When Mary was looking for a suitable husband in 1554, Clarencius spoke strongly in favour of Philip, at that moment Duke of Milan and heir to the Crowns of Castile and Aragon, among his father's many domains. The Imperial diplomats Simon Renard and the Count d'Egmont thought that Clarencius, Frideswide Strelley, and Jane Russell were Mary's most intimate confidantes, and as supporters of the Spanish marriage plan ought to be sent gifts of jewellery. She was present when Mary told Renard that she would marry Philip.

During Queen Mary's phantom pregnancy, Susan kept on assuring her that she was indeed with child, although she voiced strong doubts about her mistress's pregnancy to the French ambassador Antoine de Noailles. Susan had a reputation for being devious and greedy, as evidenced by a report by Venetian ambassador Giovanni Michieli, in which he states that she persuaded him to make a gift to Queen Mary of his coach and horses, which the queen subsequently gave to Susan.

Susan Clarencius survived her royal mistress. According to John Foxe, she and "Mr Rice" heard the queen regret the loss of Calais. At Mary's funeral, Clarencius rode in a chariot in the procession with Mrs Tymmes, Mrs Southwell, and Sybil Penn.

One of Mary's secretaries, John Boxall, claimed that Clarencius had used some of papers and documents in the bedchamber to make a searcloth, "at the ceringe of the corpse" of Mary I.

== France and Spain ==
Following Queen Mary's death in 1558, she emigrated to Spain with another of Mary's former servants, Jane Dormer, the wife of Gomez Suarez de Figueroa of Cordova, 1st Duke of Feria, a friend of Philip of Spain's.

At Antwerp, the Countess of Feria complained to an English diplomat, John Legh, that Elizabeth refused a licence for Susan Clarencieux to travel to Spain. She was at Amboise in France in April 1560 when Dormer met Mary, Queen of Scots, and Francis II of France, and she spoke to the English ambassador Nicholas Throckmorton, saying they were loyal subjects of Elizabeth I but were travelling to Spain for their religious conscience. As there is no further mention of her in the records after the spring of 1564, she probably died about that time while a member of Feria's household.

Little else is known of her life. Susan Clarencius apparently had no children, at least none that survived infancy.

== Notes ==
Court offices
| Preceded by ? | Mistress of the Robes to the Queen; 1553–1558 | Succeeded by Dorothy Stafford |
