= Frideswide Strelley =

Chamberer to Queen Mary I of England

Frideswide Strelley (died 1565), was an English courtier. She served as chamberer to Queen Mary I from 1533 onward.

== Career ==
Frideswide Strelley was a daughter of John or Leonard Knight, of South Duffield in the parish of Hemingbrough, and his wife Isabella Langholme. She was an aunt of William Knight and distantly related to the family of Guy Fawkes. The Knight family had inherited lands at nearby Spaldington, and her father is sometimes named as "John Knight of Spaldington". She joined the service of Lady Mary, later Mary I, first as a chamberer, from as early as 1533, and was later ranked as a gentlewoman. She was said to have previously been a maid of honour to Catherine of Aragon. In the accounts of Lady Mary, she appears as "maistres Knight" from 1537 and was given sums of money, once for buying fish. She had a servant or "man".

In 1548, she married Robert Strelley. As "Mrs Sturley", Frideswide Strelley rode in procession at the coronation of Mary I of England on 30 September 1553, dressed in silver and gold, her horse mantled with crimson velvet. The Imperial diplomats Simon Renard and the Count d'Egmont thought she, Susan Clarencieux and Jane Russell were Mary's most intimate confidantes, and as supporters of the Spanish marriage plan ought to be sent gifts of jewellery. Mary gave Strelley gifts. On 6 May 1554, she took delivery of a length of carnation velvet from the royal wardrobe.

It was said that during Mary's reign the Privy Council called her "mother", apparently on account of her gravity of character. A woman at court in charge of the maids of honour at court could be called the "mother", but there is no other evidence of Strelley having this role. She may have been one of the older women, ancianas, present with Mary I who are mentioned in Spanish accounts of her wedding at Winchester, although there is no reason to suppose she was older than Mary herself.

Strelley is noted for a story that she did not believe the queen was pregnant, unlike other courtiers including Susan Clarencieux who were discreet about their doubts. When Mary I accepted that she was not pregnant, she thanked Frideswide Strelley for her honesty. Mary gave her the lands of Charley Priory and Ulverscroft Priory in Leicestershire. She attended Mary's funeral in December 1558, and died in 1565.
