= Simon Renard =

Burgundian diplomat

Simon Renard de Bermont
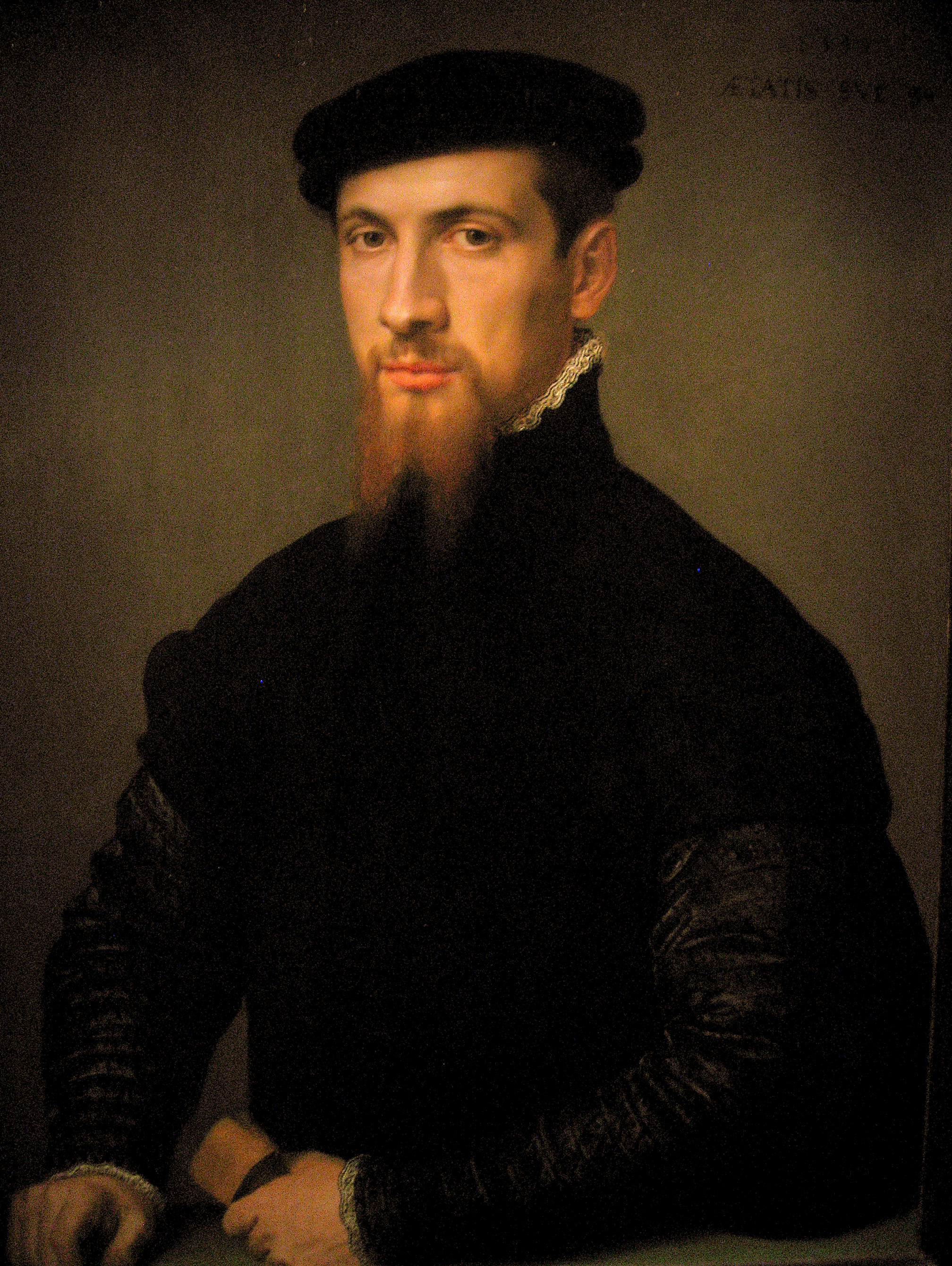
- Portrait of Simon Renard de Bermont by Anthonis Mor
- Born: 1513; Vesoul (Franche-Comté),
- Died: 1573 (aged 59–60); Madrid
- Occupations: Ambassador of Emperor Charles V, advisor of Philip II of Spain.
- Spouse: Jeanne Lullier

Simon Renard, Sieur of Bermont and Lieutenant of Aumont or Amont, (1513- 8 August 1573) was a Burgundian diplomat who served as an advisor to Emperor Charles V and his son Philip II of Spain, who were also counts of Burgundy. Renard had the court appointment of Master of Requests in Ordinary of the Emperor's household. He was ambassador of Spain in France and England. As ambassador to England, he acquired an extraordinary degree of influence over Mary I of England, and until her marriage to Philip, which he promoted, he was thought by many to be controlling the English Government.

== Life ==
Simon Renard is generally known as Renard (Fox in English), and was from the town of Vesoul. In May 1549, he was in Paris, reporting on the Anglo-French initiatives and negotiations that would end the war of the Rough Wooing, a French plan to take and fortify Alderney, and the progress of other wars. He recorded the joy of Henry II of France in July 1549 when he received five English banners captured at Inchkeith.

=== Military secrets ===
In France in 1549, Renard took information from several informants, three of whom he called Mars, Mercury, and the Captain. The Captain was perhaps Captain Marino who with his brother Ippolito, the Man from Lyons, and Colonel Melun of Cremona, an exile from Milan, who also provided military information to his colleague Jean de Saint Mauris. Marino's intelligence came from his nephew who served with Coligny. Mercury and the Captain offered information on the weaknesses of French and Piedmontese fortifications. Mercury's brother was a soldier in Scotland under d'Esse. The Captain was knowledgeable of Venetian affairs.

=== London ===
Renard joined Jean Scheyfve and his colleagues as ambassadors in London when Edward VI of England was dying. Edward's death in 1553 led to a succession crisis. Renard wrote to Antoine Perrenot de Granvelle, Bishop of Arras, describing Scheyfve's jealousy of his leading role during audiences with Mary I of England as spokesman and minute-taker. The Emperor recalled the other ambassadors on 14 September 1553 leaving Renard in charge. When he heard of his appointment, on 20 September, Renard wrote to the Emperor, begging for leave to return to Brussels to see his wife and children, and reminding the Emperor that he had organised no secretary or funds, thinking that he would only be spending 40 days in London.

On 9 September 1553, just before his three ambassadorial colleagues were recalled from England, Renard described Mary to Antoine Perrenot de Granvelle, Bishop of Arras, as "good, easily influenced, inexpert in worldly affairs and a novice all round". He thought Princess Elizabeth should be feared for she had the "power of enchantment".

Before Mary's coronation, Renard reported that arms were stockpiled in case of any attempts against her. Mary threw a banquet in October 1553 when Renard's colleagues, Scheyfve, Jean de Montmorency, Sieur de Courriéres, and Jacques de Marnix, Sieur de Thoulouse, left England, as Mary of Hungary had banqueted her envoy, the Lord Warden, Thomas Cheney. They were entertained with the music of hautboys, cornets, flutes, harps, and dulcimers. Renard noted that Princess Elizabeth, Mary's half-sister, and Lady Lennox, Mary's preferred heir, were seated together in a window above.

=== The Princess Elizabeth ===
In a newsletter to Charles V discussing Thomas Wyatt's rebellion against Mary Tudor, Renard described the arrival of Princess Elizabeth at the Tower of London. Elizabeth came to London dressed all in white and followed by a great crowd. Her litter was open to show herself to the people, and her pale face had a proud expression to hide her vexation, or as Renard put it, "pour desguyser le regret qu'elle a". Mary would not see her and she was lodged in the Palace where she could be watched with a few attendants. Elizabeth was sent to the Tower by boat down the Thames. Her arrival was delayed by a day to 18 March 1554 as she missed the tide while writing a letter to Mary. The council rather than Mary, said Renard, had arranged Elizabeth's removal. Elizabeth's arrival at the Tower was described by John Foxe and dramatised in Thomas Heywood's, If You Know Not Me, You Know Nobody, or The Troubles of Queen Elizabeth (1605) which supplied Elizabeth's much-quoted dialogue at Traitors' Gate.

Renard's influence over Mary is agreed to have been very great. When he was made sole ambassador in London she wrote to Charles V that "his presence is and shall always be very acceptable to us". She trusted few if any of her English councillors: as she later said, "she could scarcely see any one of them who had not done her an injury or would fail to do so again if the opportunity presented itself". On the other hand, trusting the Emperor absolutely, she would, in any case, have been disposed to listen to his envoy, and Renard's charm and intelligence did the rest. Although on his arrival in England he had initially urged her to acknowledge Lady Jane Grey as Queen, she magnanimously overlooked this; he was after all still unfamiliar with English politics, and Mary herself had initially been unsure how much public support she had. During Wyatt's Rebellion, he sensibly advised her to stay in London, arguing that to lose control of the capital was to lose the crown itself.

Mary, however, did not always take his advice: she showed far more clemency to the supporters of Lady Jane Grey than he thought wise, and despite his repeated urgings never took decisive action against her half-sister. He was unhappy with the role of Parliament in the English constitution, but Mary was resolved to follow her father's policy of ruling with the advice and consent of Parliament. For the most notorious episode of the reign, the Marian Persecutions, Renard had no responsibility: he was not a fanatic, and his letters make clear that he was opposed to the burning of heretics, which he feared might lead to revolution.

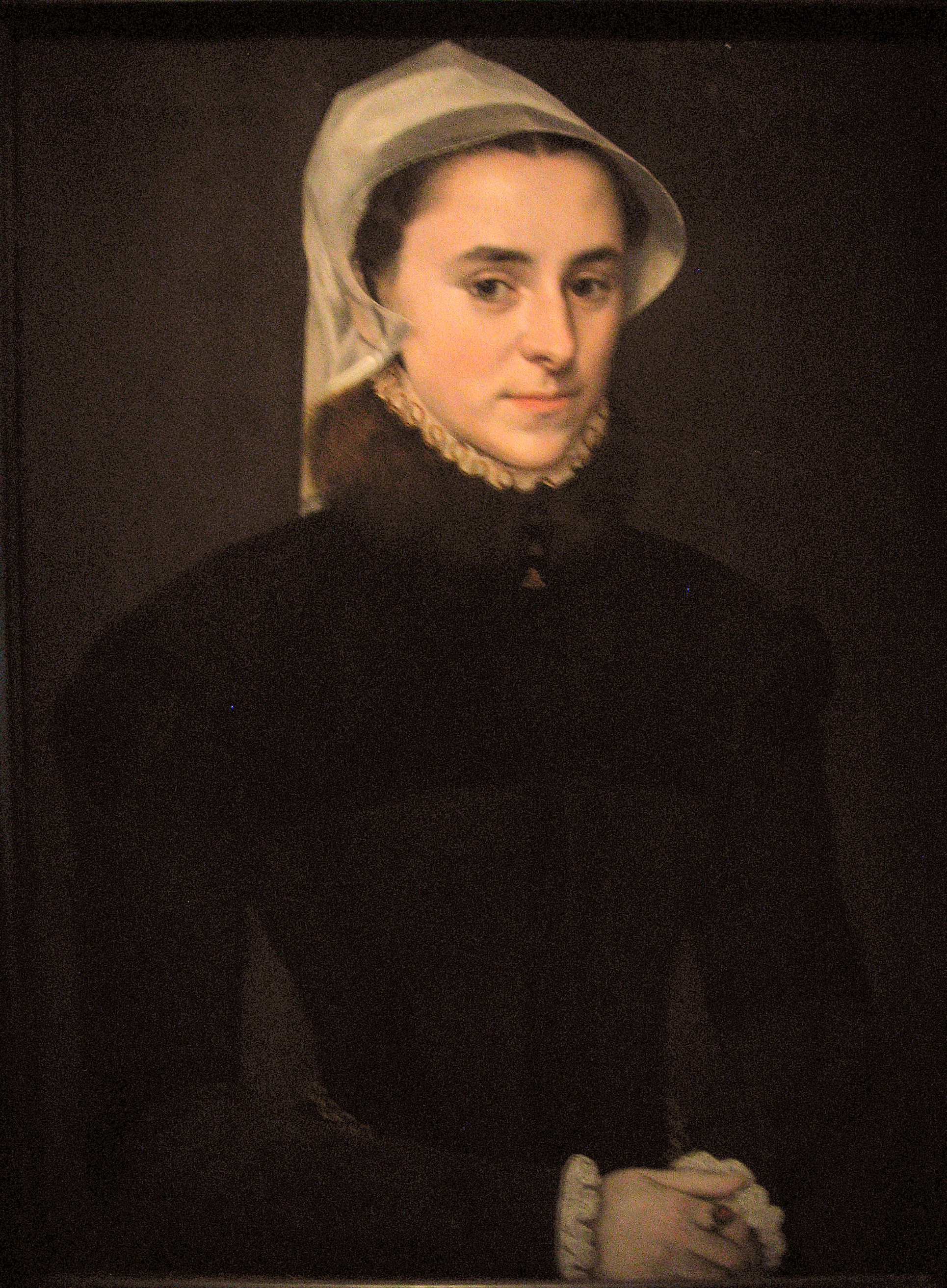
Jeanne Lullier, wife of Simon Renard. Portrait by Antonis Mor (1557). Musée du Temps- Besançon.

=== Mary and Philip ===
Renard remained in England negotiating the marriage of Queen Mary I with the future King Philip II of Spain. He spoke with Mary about rumours she would marry Edward Courtenay. Renard's great achievement was Mary's Spanish marriage, but he advised her on many other issues, even religion on which he frankly admitted he was no expert.

When it became clear that Philip and Mary's marriage would be childless, Renard reversed his previous policy and urged Mary to reconcile with Elizabeth and recognise her as heir presumptive. Deeply though Renard distrusted Elizabeth, he was even less happy at the prospect of the throne passing to the next heir, Mary, Queen of Scots, who was shortly to be married to Francis II of France, and was thus wholly identified with French interests.

After Mary's marriage, Renard's influence declined, due to Philip's suspicion of him, and he asked to be recalled, but the Emperor refused, believing that the experience he had gained of English affairs, and Mary's affection for him, made him invaluable as an envoy. When a coolness developed between the royal couple, Renard took it upon himself to advise Philip that while Mary might not be as "agreeable and gracious" as he wished, nonetheless she deserved to be treated with consideration.

Renard's diplomatic career was eventually compromised by his former secretary or master household in London. Etienne Quiclet, who sold his ciphers and papers to the French. In September 1557, Quiclet was put on trial in France and revealed secrets that embarrassed Renard. Philip, who unlike his father had never liked or trusted Renard, dismissed him in the following year. He was finally recalled from England at his own request in the autumn of 1555, although he continued for some time afterwards to advise the Emperor on English affairs.

== Reputation ==
Renard has been praised by historians for his intelligence, patience, subtlety and diplomatic skill. However English historians, notably Mary's biographer H.F.M. Prescott have judged him rather harshly, arguing that, given his great influence over Mary in the early years of the reign, he must bear much of the responsibility for the disasters of the later years.

His coat-of-arms was red with a gold chevron, charged with three silver crescents.
