= George White (died 1584) =

English politician

George White (ca. 1530 – 1584), of Hutton, Essex, was an English politician.

He was a member (MP) of the parliament of England for Liverpool in 1558.
