= List of artworks with contested provenance =

Throughout the world, there are many works of art that have a contested provenance. This may be due to theft, lost documentation, looting, or just information lost to antiquity. In some cases, just the previous or current ownership of the work is disputed, but in other cases the authenticity of the work itself may be thought to be a forgery. During World War II, Nazis stole many works of art from Jewish families, or looted them from cities in the war.

== Art Institute of Chicago ==
In 2024 the Manhattan District Attorney demanded that the Art Institute of Chicago relinquish the painting Russian War Prisoner by Egon Schiele, arguing in a court filing that the painting was looted by Nazis from the Holocaust victim Fritz Grünbaum, and that the provenance published by the museum was false. The Art Institute of Chicago, the only American museum to resist the seizures, fought back in a court filing of its own, saying that "it had been legally sold by Grünbaum’s heirs".

== Cleveland Museum of Art – Apollo Sauroktonos by Praxiteles ==
The Cleveland Museum of Art purchased a bronze sculpture of Apollo Sauroktonos, which some believe to be the only bronze in existence from the original Greek artist Praxiteles. However, the work has an incomplete provenance, and some claim it is a later Roman copy.

== Louvre – Bronze Monkeys ==
Recently there has been debate within the antiques industry regarding a bronze monkey held in the Louvre initially believed to be the work of famous sculptor Giambologna. Following the finding of two other bronze monkeys by British antique dealer Colin Wilson, however, the validity of the monkey held in the Louvre, claimed by 'experts' to be the real work of Giambologna, has been called into question. The Louvre monkey is simply too deep to fit the niche in which it was supposedly situated on the Samson and a Philistine fountain it was originally designed and created for. The quality of the monkey in the Louvre is also up for debate; the form is not lifelike, the fur is not realistic, and the pose does not match the poses of the monkeys in the Uffizi drawing, which is the only evidence for the monkeys being in the niches. Colin Wilson's monkeys, however, do match this drawing, are made of a gunmetal dated to the 16th/17th century, are unrefined, and are of a high lead content, all of which are traits of a work of Giambologna. The debate continues to this day. In July 2008, the Colin Wilson monkeys, along with a newly discovered third, were sold at auction.

== Republic of Austria – the equestrian painting of Bellini from the Sarah Lederer Collection ==
Ernst Lederer, a well known art historian, has been "dazu bewogen" (induced) to "donate" this valuable painting to the Republic of Austria in return for an export license for a fragment of the large Lederer collection which was destroyed at the end of the war by SS troops at Schloss Immendorf (including famous paintings by Klimt and Schiele) or like the textiles and drawings disappeared during 1938–1940. In such a case Austrian courts would refuse to accept any claims for compensation. The famous Klimt Fries in the Lederer collection was, however, not included in the export license, and it took until the 1970s when Chancellor Bruno Kreisky himself started negotiations for the Republic of Austria to buy the Klimt Fries from Lederer. When Erich Lederer had tried to get back the Bellini painting in the 1950s the Austrian Ministry for Education refused.

== Other items ==
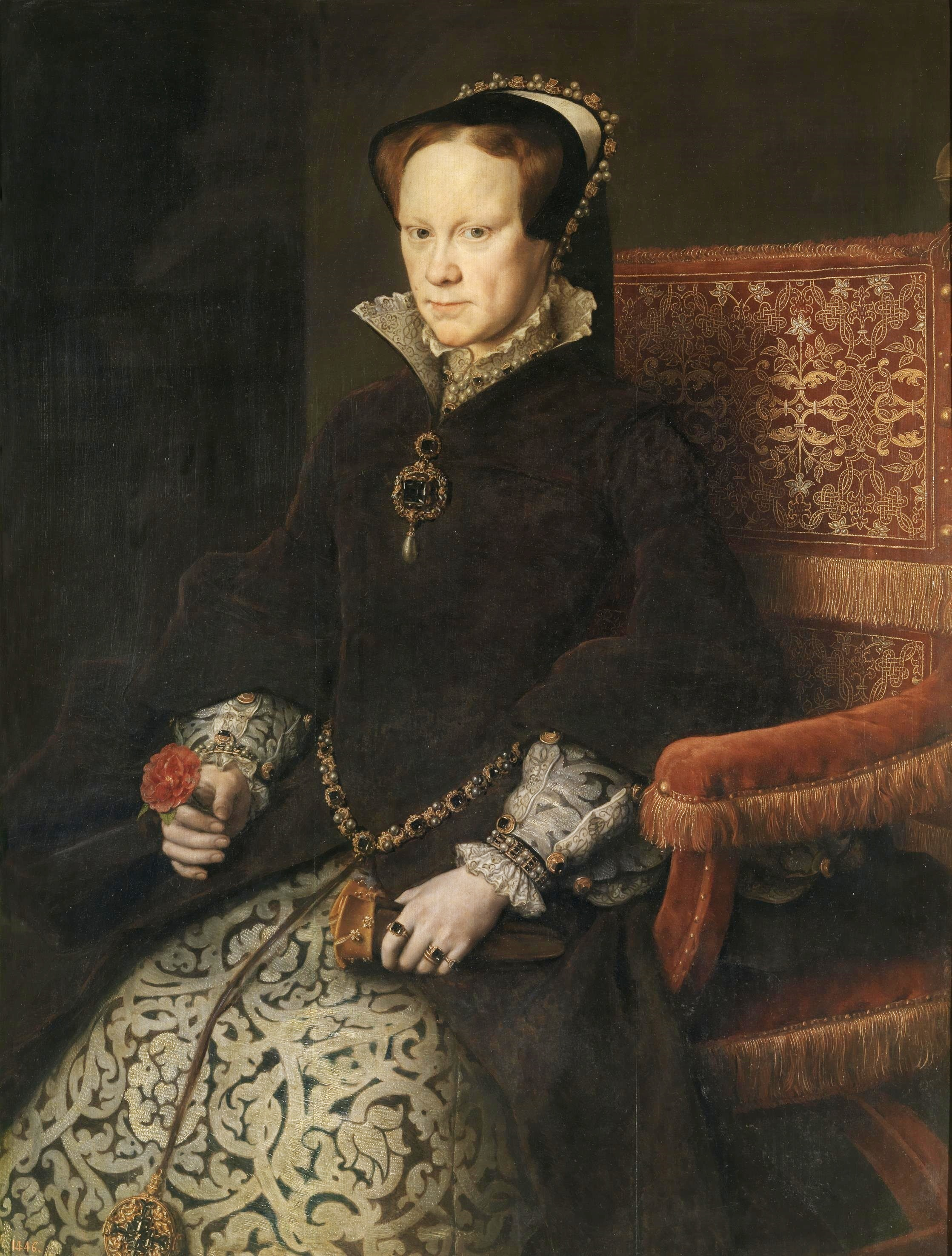
Mary Tudor wearing the Mary Tudor pearl, sometimes identified as the Pearl of Kuwait or (mistakenly) as La Peregrina

- Victorious Youth
- The Hunt of the Unicorn
- Getty kouros
- The Mary Tudor pearl, one of the most famous stones in the crown jewelry of Spain, most commonly associated with the pearl known today as La Peregrina, but the Pearl of Kuwait is also claimed to be historical original.
- Sripuranthan Natarajan Idol
- Tilla Durieux portrait by Oskar Kokoschka
- Flora (bust)
- An unclear and disputed selection of life-size hellenistic and roman style bronze sculptures from a suspected professional modern forger or group of forgers, coined as the Spanish Master Workshop

== See also ==
- Art discovery
- Héctor Feliciano
- Restitution of looted art
- List of claims for restitution for Nazi-looted art
