= Jewels of Mary I =

Jewels belonging to Mary I of England

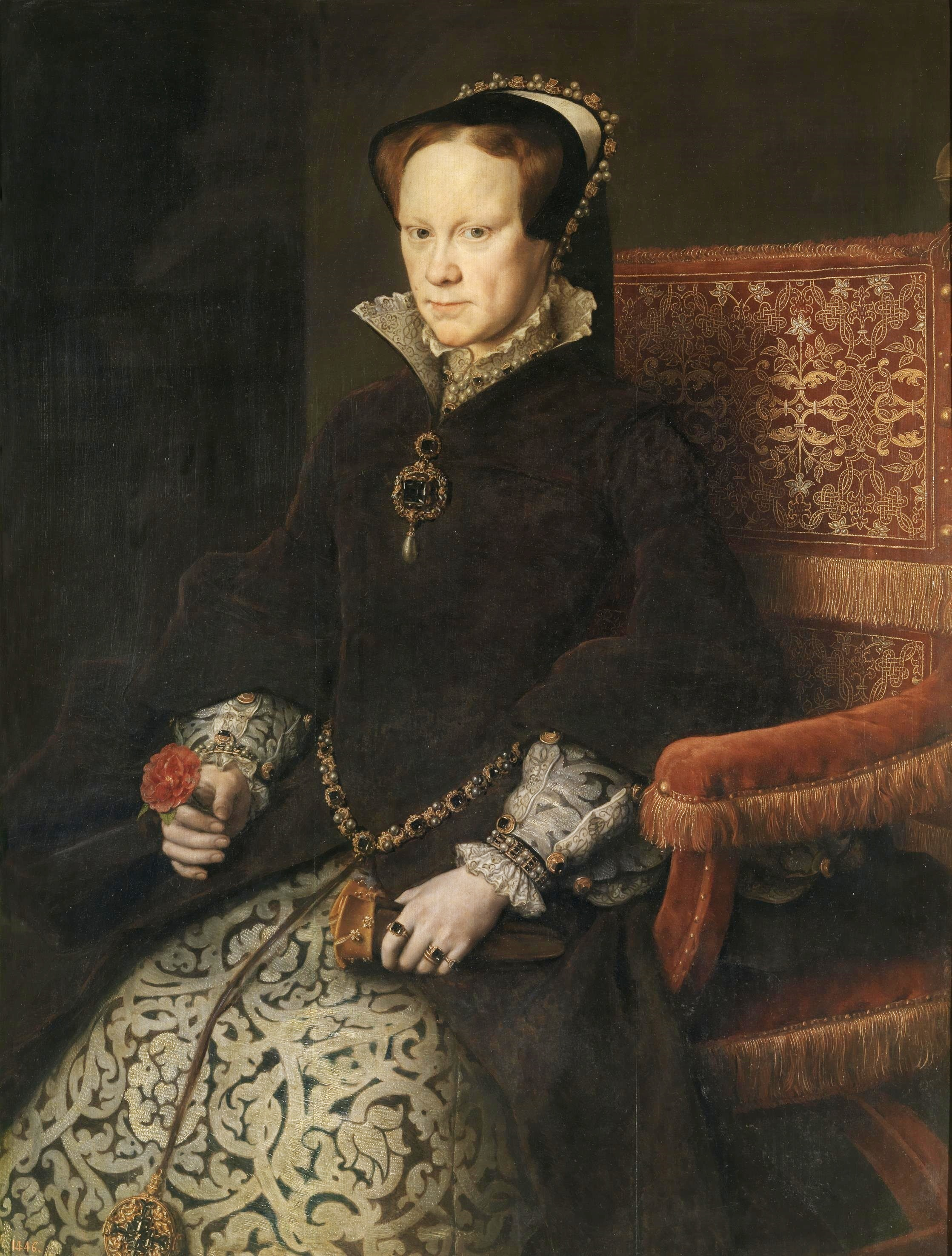
Mary I, Antonis Mor, Prado

An inventory of the jewels of Queen Mary I of England, known as Princess Mary or the Lady Mary in the years 1542 to 1546, was kept by her lady in waiting Mary Finch. The manuscript is now held by the British Library. It was published by Frederic Madden in 1831. Some pieces are listed twice. The British Library also has an inventory of the jewels she inherited on coming to the throne in 1553.

== Initial letters and gold crosses ==
Mary's mother, Catherine of Aragon died in 1536, and bequeathed Mary a gold collar or necklace which she had brought from Spain in 1501. It had a gold cross which contained, according to Eustace Chapuys, a relic of the True Cross. Thomas Cromwell ordered that the cross be sent to him. Chapuys reported that Cromwell returned it to Mary after finding its gold content was low and, as a Protestant, he had no use for the relic.

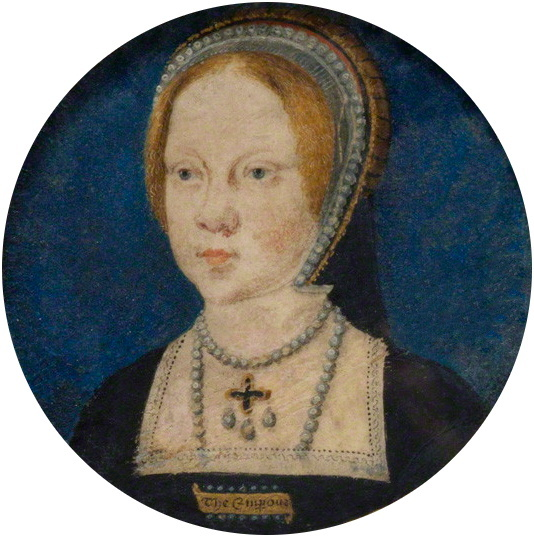
Princess Mary, by Lucas Horenbout, depicted with a diamond cross pendant.

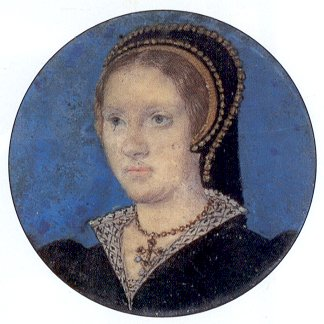
Princess Mary, formerly said to be Catherine Parr, with gold cross, attributed to Susannah Horenbout, displayed at Compton Verney

Mary owned a letter "M" with three rubies and two diamonds and a large pendant pearl. She also had an "H" with a ruby and a pendant pearl. A gold scented pomander worn at her girdle was a gift from Mary Tudor, Queen of France. Her miniature portrait painted by Lucas Horenbout in the 1520s depicts a diamond cross pendant with three pendant pearls, perhaps the little cross with four great diamonds listed in one of her later inventories. Henry VIII gave Mary another cross, with 6 fair diamonds, and three pendant pearls, on 20 July 1546, and one of these crosses appears to be worn in a miniature by Susannah Horenbout, recently established to be a portrait of Mary.

Mary's royal status varied during her childhood, as her father divorced her mother Catherine of Aragon and made other marriages. Marriages were also planned for her, which entailed new clothes and jewels. In July 1533, her chamberlain, John Hussey, and a lady in waiting, Frances Aylmer, were ordered to deliver her jewels to Thomas Cromwell. In March 1534, the diplomat Eustache Chapuys wrote that Mary's "principal jewels and ornaments" had all been confiscated.

In 1536, Catherine of Aragon bequeathed her gold collar and cross to Mary, which was said to contain a relic of the true cross. Catherine Howard gave Mary a gold pomander containing a clock while they were on a progress at Pontefract Castle in 1541. Catherine kept a gold chain set with turquoises, rubies, and pearls which was used to suspend the pomander from a girdle.

== Court of Edward VI ==
According to John Aylmer, during the reign of Edward VI, Elizabeth and Jane Grey wore relatively plain dress compared to Mary. Aylmer, (who was a tutor of Jane Grey), wrote to Henry Bullinger about suitable costume for young women, stating that "gold, jewels, and the braiding of hair" were not yet set aside at Edward's court.

== Goldsmiths and makers ==
As well as jewels for her costume, Mary was surrounded with expensive furnishings and valuable plate. In November 1525, the council for her household asked Cardinal Thomas Wolsey for advice about celebrating Christmas. They wondered if Mary should acquire a ship of silver (a nef), a silver alms dish, and spice plates, and what New Year's Day gifts she should send.

Mary stored her jewels in a coffer made in 1542 by the craftsman William Green. A biography of Jane Dormer claims that she was in charge of the jewels which Mary kept in her bedchamber and wore regularly. John Mabbe, a London goldsmith, mended her jewelry and made her sets of aglets. Hans Holbein the Younger designed jewels for her. Two of his surviving drawings feature a ribbon with the inscription, "MI LADI PRINSIS", (My Lady Princess), for Mary or possibly Elizabeth.

The goldsmith Peter Richardson provided her New Year's Day gift for Henry VIII in 1544. Cornelis Hayes, a Flemish jeweller, may have realised Holbein's designs. Holbeins's friend Hans of Antwerp and Rogier Horton worked for her. Another name that appears in her records is "Raynolds," which may refer to Robert Reynes or Raynes, who was granted a coat of arms in 1558. On 25 July 1554, she ordered some of the jewels in the Tower of London to be delivered to her goldsmith "Affabel Partriche".

== Jewels at Mary's accession ==
In April 1553, Lady Mary was given a table diamond with a pendant pearl which had belonged to Anne Seymour, Duchess of Somerset. At the same time, Jane Dudley, Duchess of Northumberland, was given a tablet locket with a clock, enamelled black, which had also belonged to the Duchess of Somerset. Robert Wingfield wrote that Mary was told of the death of Edward VI in July 1553 by her goldsmith Robert Raynes. Raynes was employed to engrave official seals, and provided gold chains and flagons for diplomatic gifts. He made the cramp rings which were distributed by the monarch on Good Friday. Raynes was granted the manor of Stanford on Soar in Nottinghamshire in 1558. Richard Wilbram or Wilbraham was appointed keeper and master of the Jewel House.

Mary got custody of jewels which had belonged to her father and mother, Henry VIII and Catherine of Aragon, in 1553 when she became queen. According to Hugues Cousin le Vieux, an Imperial courtier and quartermaster, Henry Dudley had taken some jewels and rings from the royal treasury to reward potential supporters of the Duke of Northumberland and Lady Jane Grey in France. The Imperial ambassador Simon Renard had reported this story as an unconfirmed rumour in July 1553. Some manuscript inventories of jewels from 1553, and published versions or derivatives, appear to be connected with Lady Jane Grey, Andrew Dudley and Arthur Stourton, Keeper of Westminster Palace, or with the Duchess of Somerset, but the evidence is unclear. One list includes a zibellino, a sable skin with a gold head with a ruby tongue and gold feet and paws, which appears the inventory of Henry VIII. Some of the jewels had been issued for weddings, and Edward VI had requested by warrant a diamond jewel with a pendant pearl for Mary to wear in April 1553.

An inventory of jewels, held by the British Library (Harley 7376), has marginal notes recording gifts made by Mary in 1553 and later years, noting items taken for her coronation, and pearls delivered to her embroiderer Guilliam Brallot. Mary wore French hoods at this time, decorated with gold and jewel-set bands of "billiments". She gave pairs of billiments of "goldsmith work" to the ladies and gentlewomen in her coronation procession, including Mistress Anne Poyntz, mother of the maids.

These billiments were worn at the Royal Entry on 30 September 1553 before Mary's coronation. Mary wore a caul or veil of tinsel fabric set with pearls and precious stones, with a newly made gold circlet or coronet like a "hooped garland" also set with precious stones. According to some chronicle narratives, she had to hold these heavy items on her head with her hands. These comments may imply misogynistic criticism of the unprecedented female coronation, suggesting that the trappings of majesty were too weighty.

A copy of an inventory of royal jewels made in 1550 was used to record items issued from the Jewel House to Mary. On 4 June 1556, she requested a pair of steel and gold bracelets, black enamelled, each set with 9 small diamonds and 3 larger diamonds.

== Costume set with pearls ==
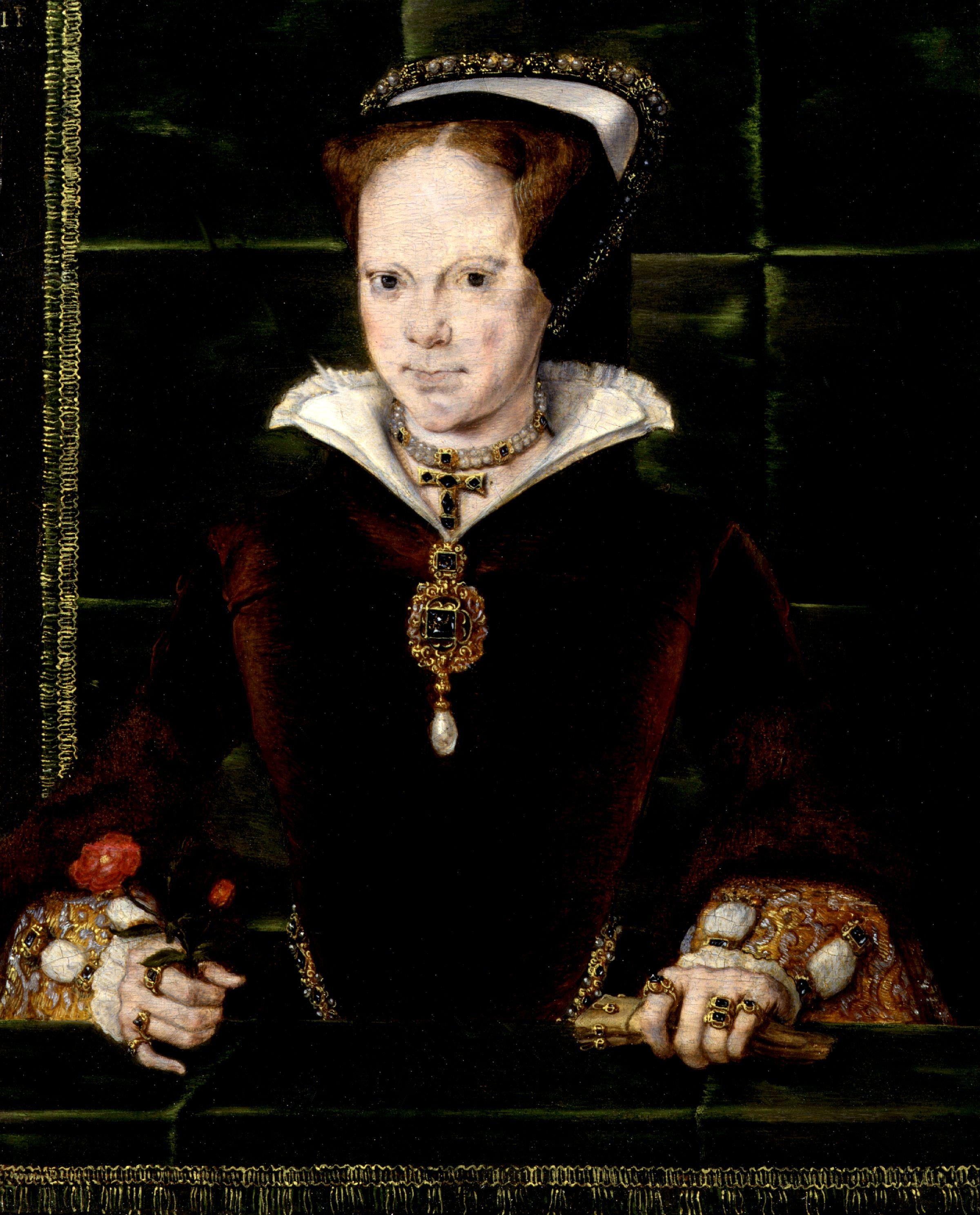
Mary I, Hans Eworth, NPG, wearing the Mary Tudor pearl

Princess Mary bought 100 pearls while at Richmond Palace in December 1537. She had items of costume embroidered with 581 pearls in total. A lace for her neck had 67 pearls, a "nether abillment" had 33 great pearls, another "nether abillment" had 38 lesser sized pearls, an upper abillment had 40 pearls, and another upper abillment had 80 mean or lesser pearls. A partlet had 108 fair pearls, and a second partlet was sewn with 71 pearls of the same grade.

The "abillments" or "billaments" were bands of jewels worn on the coif over the forehead, typically with a French hood. On 20 July 1546, her father Henry VIII gave her an upper abillment set with 10 table diamonds, 9 rock rubies, and 38 small pearls, with another abillment of rock rubies and fair pearls, and a third abillment of diamonds, rock rubies and pearls. He gave other jewels at this time, including a cross set with diamonds and three pendant pearls and a "Jesus", the initials "IHS" (known as the Sacred Monogram), set with diamonds and three pendant pearls, a brooch with the story of Abraham set with a fair table diamond and another Abraham brooch set with 7 diamonds and a ruby, and a tablet or locket with Solomon's temple on one side a portcullis on the other.

== Brooches and pendants ==
In July 1546, Henry gave Mary a brooch with the story of Pyramus and Thisbe, which had a large diamond table and four rubies, and a girdle of gold friar's knots. She gave this to her sister Elizabeth in 1553. Elizabeth gave a jewel depicting the same subject to Mary, Queen of Scots in September 1575.

The brooches and ensigns worn in England at this time mostly depicted Old Testament subjects. Some of Mary's jewels depicted religious subjects, including Moses, John the Evangelist, and Susanna and the Elders. A list of jewels requested by Lady Jane Grey as Queen on 14 July 1553 (and delivered by Arthur Stourton) includes a tablet, made book fashion, with the story of David and three sapphires on the other side. There were two diamond set brooches with story of David and Goliath in the Jewel House in 1559.

According to the Venetian ambassador, Giacomo Soranzo, Mary's costume as queen involved,

arraying herself elegantly and magnificently, and her garments are of two sorts; the one, a gown such as men wear, but fitting very close, with an under-petticoat which has a very long train; and this is her ordinary costume, being also that of the gentlewomen of England. The other garment is a gown and bodice, with wide hanging sleeves (con lo maniche larghe rovesciate) in the French fashion, which she wears on state occasions. She also wears much embroidery, and gowns and mantles (sopravesti) of cloth of gold and cloth of silver, of great value, and changes every day. She also makes great use of jewels, wearing them both on her chaperon (her hood) and around her neck, and as trimming for her gowns.

In addition to the inventory of jewels requested by Lady Jane Grey held by New College, Oxford and related items in the British Library and Cecil papers, the British Library has an inventory of jewels received by Mary in the first years of her reign, with some items received from Anne Seymour, Duchess of Somerset. Mary's jewels included, an "H and K" with a large emerald and a large pearl pendant, a gold whistle in the form of a mermaid, her torso enameled white and her tail of mother-of-pearl, with bracelets and "habiliments".

Mary received another whistle from the Jewel House on 3 December 1554 which was joined to a dragon set with emeralds. Mary wore a girdle around her waist, sometimes with a descending extension attached to a jewel, pomander, or book. One girdle had 15 diamonds and 15 rubies in pairs, alternating with the "words" or motto of the Order of the Garter, "Honi Soit Qui Mal y Pense" in black enamel with 3 diamonds. The buckle was set with a table diamond.

== Wedding at Winchester ==
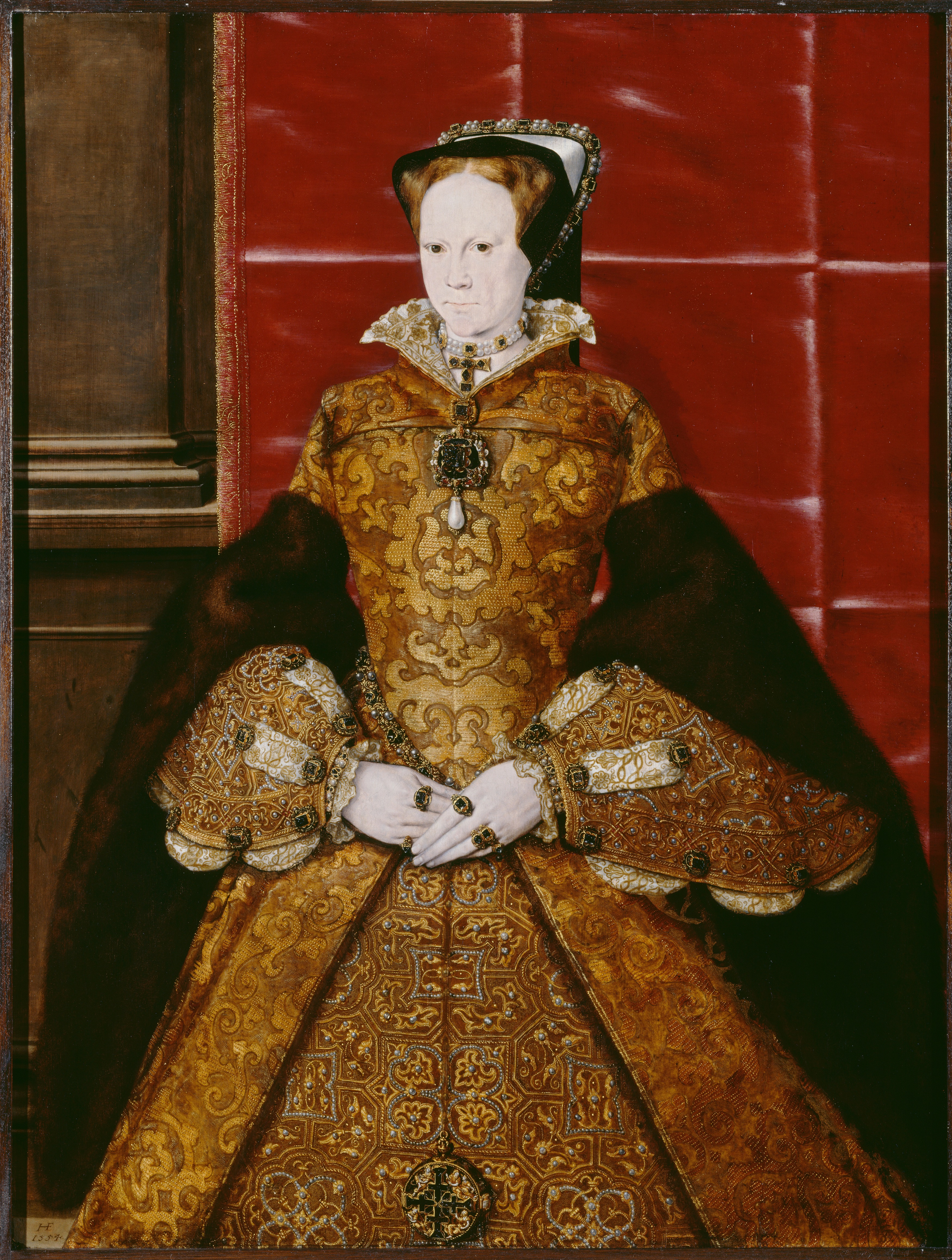
Mary I of England, by Hans Eworth, Society of Antiquaries of London

Hans Eworth painted Mary with apparently realistic pieces of jewellery. His depictions may reflect an informed interest, as some members of his family, François Eeuwouts and Nicholas Eeuwouts, were goldsmiths and stone cutters. In his portraits of Mary, based on a sitting in the winter after her coronation, a Tau cross may be possibly be identified as a piece formerly belonging to Catherine of Aragon, and large brooch with its central stones flanked by antique figures, as a jewel belonging to Katherine Parr, and one of her finger rings may be her spousing or engagement ring.

Before the wedding, Charles V, Holy Roman Emperor sent a ring or jewel and the Imperial ambassador Simon Renard advised that gifts of jewels should be made to the courtiers Frideswide Strelley, Susan Clarencieux and Mistress Russell. When Mary married Philip II of Spain at Winchester Cathedral on 25 July 1554, she wore a "diamond mounted on a setting in the form of a rose, with a huge pearl hanging down onto the chest", described in an Italian account of the wedding as "jewellery on the breast with a diamond in the centre, which the Prince had sent from Spain as a present, worth 60,000 scudi, sparkling on all sides, to which was attached a pearl pendant, estimated to be worth 5,000 scudi". This jewel may be represented in her portraits by Hans Eworth and Anthonis Mor. Mary's pearl is perhaps confused with the Spanish royal La Peregrina pearl.

A gown of Mary's described in a later royal inventory may have been the one worn on her wedding day; a French gown of rich gold tissue, with a border of purple satin, all over embroidered with purls of damask gold and pearls, lined with purple taffeta. Her embroiderer was called Guilliam Brallot or Brellant. Elizabeth I's tailors unpicked the small pearls from this garment for re-use.

Another rich gown of Mary's, later listed in Elizabeth's inventory, was made of crimson satin embroidered with pearls in the sleeves and borders of the train, and five roses embroiderered on its train with red garnets. The pearls were taken off. The pearls from these gowns may be those appraised for sale by the goldsmiths Hugh Kayle, John Spilman, and Leonard Bushe in October 1600, including 250 oriental pearls worth £206 and "meaner" sized pearls worth £40.

== Report of Giacamo Soranzo ==
The Venetian ambassador Giacomo Soranzo described Mary and her appearance in a report, a Relazione, of 18 August 1554. He said that Mary usually wore a kind of loose gown with a petticoat and long train, which was the fashion of English gentlewomen. On state occasions she favoured a gown and bodice in the French fashion with wide hangings sleeves. She made much use of jewels which she wore on her chaperon or hood and around her neck, and also as trimmining for her gowns. She had inherited many jewels and would buy more if she were wealthy.

== A collar of P and M ==
Mary is sometimes said to have worn a gold collar set with diamonds and pearls and the initials "P" and "M" at her wedding, but her will states this piece was Philip's gift to her at Epiphany. There were nine ciphers of "P & M" with nine large diamonds set in gold, and each piece had a pendant pearl.

It was inherited by Elizabeth I and was in the secret Jewel House at the Tower of London in 1605, then featuring eight pointed diamonds and a table diamond. James VI and I annexed the collar with its "eight fair pointed diamonds" to the crown for posterity in March 1606. It was worn by Anne of Denmark in January 1608 at The Masque of Beauty. It appears in Anne of Denmark's jewellery inventory as:

Item a rich coller of 18 pieces, whereof 9 with Cyphers of the letters P: M: and 9. of diamonds, 8 of them poynted and one a table; which was brought out of the Tower by his Majesties direction and geven to her Majestie, agaynst the maske at twelfnyght 1607. every piece havinge a pearl pende

Mary's gentlewomen were also given jewels with pictures and insignia of Philip. An inventory of the jewels of Anne Herbert, Countess of Pembroke includes a locket or "tablet" with portraits of Philip and his father Charles V, and another tablet with the initial "P" set with diamonds. Philip gave Thomas Radclyffe, 3rd Earl of Sussex, who had been involved in the marriage negotiations, a sword with two great table diamonds, a table ruby, a pointed diamond, and a great balas. Mary gave the courtier William Petre a diamond ring.

== Legacy jewels ==
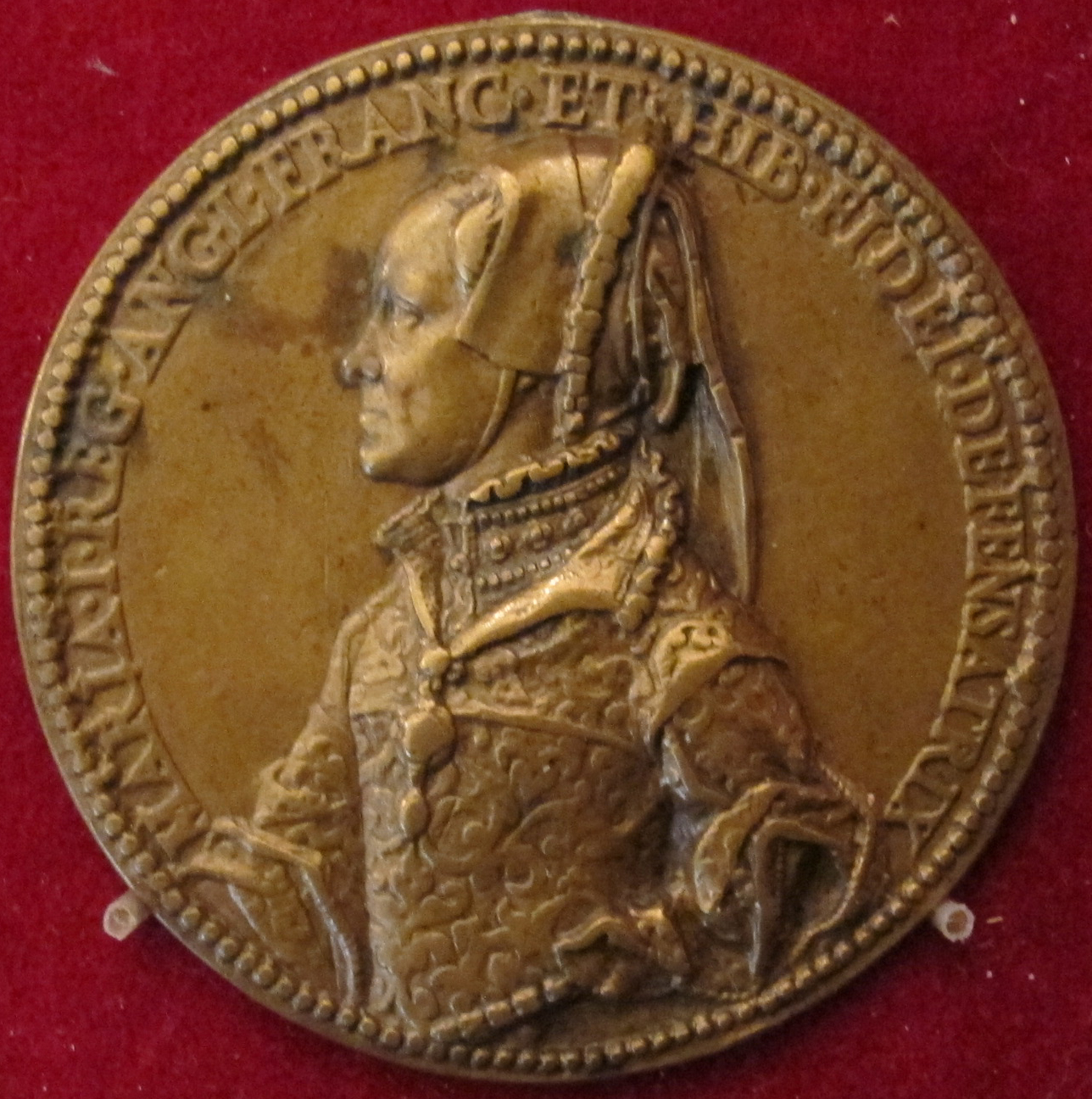
Medal of Mary by Jacopo da Trezzo, wearing coif ornamented with jewels

When Mary was dying or dead at St James's Palace, Nicholas Throckmorton is said to have ridden to tell Elizabeth I at Hatfield of her sister's death, bringing a token of a ring with black enamel decoration which was Mary's espousal ring, a gift from Philip.

In her will, Mary mentioned as bequests to Philip II:

- the table diamond that Charles V had sent her by the Count of Egmont.
- a table diamond brought by the Pedro Dávila y Zúñiga, Marquis de las Navas, presented at Guildford Castle, this was a diamond ring which Charles V had given his wife, Isabella of Portugal.
- the collar of gold with nine diamonds (presumably the collar of "P" and "M"), which Philip II had given her at Epiphany after their marriage
- a ruby set in gold ring brought by the Count of Feria.

The Count of Feria, heard that Mary had given Philip II a coffer with jewels that had belonged to Henry VIII, including a jewelled dagger, which remained in London. Jane Dormer, Countess of Feria, Mary's former lady in waiting, delivered jewels to Elizabeth I in 1559, some of which had been Mary's. The list includes a tablet with an Imperial spread eagle of diamonds on one side and two diamond pillars and the Emperor's word on the other, with a closed crown and the toison d'or, with three pendant pearls; with a "picture of Queen Marie in golde with a boxe of wood"; and a "little tablet of ten pearls which was one of the Queen's majesty's that now is (Elizabeth's), as Mistress Parry says". Blanche Parry, Lady Knollys and Margery Norris scrutinised the returned jewels for defects and losses.

Philip II subsequently received his English garter jewels. In 1645, James Howell wrote that Philip II had left all Mary's jewels to Elizabeth "without diminution", leading foreign writers to accuse her of ingratitude.

The German traveller Lupold von Wedel saw a red velvet-covered chest with some of Mary's jewels on display at Whitehall Palace in 1584. He was told they had been gifts from Philip. One item in Elizabeth's collection in 1587 was a miniature case, "a tablet with a story on the one side and a table balas ruby in the midst, and on the other side a city having in the top thereof five little diamonds and nineteen little rubies and a great square diamond underneath and within the tablet is the picture of King Philip".

Mary's abillments or billiments for wearing on her headdress seem to have still been in the Secret Jewel House at the Tower of London in 1605 when Francis Gofton made an inventory for James VI and I. Amongst her jewels in 1606, Anne of Denmark had a jewel of gold with a square emerald and a dragon with greyhound on the back, with the half rose and pomegranate, the emblems of Catherine of Aragon.

== Gifts given by Mary ==
Princess Mary gave a number of jewels from her collection as gifts, some recorded as marginal notes in Mary Finch's inventory in her own handwriting. Mary gave Jane Seymour (died 1561), her maid of honor, a balas ruby with a little diamond and three small pendant pearls. Lady Jane Grey received a "lace for the neck of goldsmith's work". Mary sent her brother New Year's Day gifts, and in 1546 he received a locket from Catherine Parr with miniature portraits of herself and Henry VIII.

=== Cecily, Lady Mansel, and Mistress Nurse ===
Mary gave jewels to Cecily Dabridgecourt, Lady Mansel, a member of her household since 1525, including three brooches, a "pointed diamond", and several other pieces recorded in the British Library Harley MS 7376 inventory. The will of Rice Mansel, Cecily's husband, mentions an "upper abiliment" for a French hood, which may have been a gift from the queen. Mary gave a gold brooch depicting Saint George to the "Mistress Nurse's daughter", perhaps her namesake Mary Penn, the daughter of Sybil Penn, the nurse of Prince Edward.

=== Princess Elizabeth ===
Princess Elizabeth received a gold pomander with a dial or clock set in it. On 21 September 1553, Mary gave Elizabeth the brooch of Pyramus and Thisbe and a pair of white coral prayer beads, with a number of other jewels recorded in Harley 7376. Katherine Howard had given Mary the pomander when she was at Pontefract Castle. Mary hoped that Elizabeth would wear these jewels at her coronation, though the French ambassador Antoine de Noailles reported that Elizabeth (who supposedly preferred somber clothing) refused.

=== Margaret Douglas, Countess of Lennox ===
Gifts were given to Margaret Douglas, including a brooch made especially to be a New Year's Day gift by John Busshe, a goldsmith in the parish of St Katherine Coleman. When she married the Earl of Lennox in 1544, Mary's gifts included; a balas ruby with a table cut diamond and three mean (smaller) pendant pearls; a gold brooch with a large sapphire; a brooch of gold with a balas ruby and the History of Susanne, and a gold brooch with the History of David. After her accession, Mary gave Lady Margaret Douglas two gowns of cloth of gold, a gold belt or girdle set with rubies and diamonds, and a large pointed diamond for a ring.

In the Bute portrait of Margaret Tudor, the mother of Margaret Douglas, currently displayed at the National Gallery of Scotland, she is depicted wearing a medallion or circular brooch at her girdle with an image and text from the story of Susannah and the Elders.

The executor of the Countess of Lennox, Thomas Fowler brought some of her jewels to Scotland, the inheritance of Arbella Stuart, possibly including gifts from Mary, and they were obtained by the Earl of Bothwell in 1590. The Countess of Shrewsbury wrote to William Cecil for help recovering Arbella's jewels. A list of 21 jewels in a casket bequeathed Arbella by Margaret Douglas, and kept by Thomas Fowler was made in April 1590. It includes an "H" of gold set with a rock ruby, and a gold sable head set with diamonds for a zibellino, but the items cannot be clearly identified as gifts from Mary Tudor. Another list of Arbella's jewels was made in 1607.

=== Lady Anne Clifford ===
Lady Anne Clifford made a will at Pendragon Castle on 1 May 1674. She bequeathed to Margaret, Countess Dowager of Thanet, a "bracelet of little pomander beads, set in gold and enamalling", which she usually wore under her stomacher. Anne Clifford wrote that the beads were over 100 years old, and had been a gift from Philip to Mary, and were given to her great-grandmother, Anne, Countess of Bedford (died 1559), wife of John Russell, 1st Earl of Bedford.

== See also ==
- Jewels of James V of Scotland
- Jewels of Mary, Queen of Scots
- Jewels of Anne of Denmark
