= Art discovery =

Identification of undocumented art worls

Art discovery refers to the process by which researchers, art historians, collectors, dealers, and other knowledgeable individuals find artworks by prominent artists which were not previously or correctly identified.

== Examples ==
=== Modern findings ===
In 2011 a British art dealer, Philip Mould, received major news coverage for discovering a set of paintings by Anthony van Dyck which had not been previously identified. Mould has made a number of major art discoveries, including some of Thomas Gainsborough's earliest known works, the only known portrait of Arthur, Prince of Wales and lost works by Anthony van Dyck and Thomas Lawrence. In January 2021, Mould found a miniature portrait of French king Henri III by Jean Decourt.

Mould described some of the basic concepts for art discoveries, in an article published in the Guardian;

Although [Mould] acknowledged that auctioneers do not have the benefit of cleaning and restoring works, which help to reveal true quality, he added: "As art dealers, we scour daily the world's auction catalogues for paintings that are … wrongly identified … In any week, our finds might range from a misidentified Tudor icon to a misattributed 18th-century landscape … but by a strange chance we seem to have hit a seam of Van Dycks."

== See also ==
=== General overviews ===
- Art
- Art history
- Art collection
- Paintings
- History of painting
- List of anonymous masters
- Antiques
- Art appraisal

=== Related topics ===
- Conservation and restoration of cultural property
- List of artworks with contested provenance
- Lost artworks
- Provenance of artworks
- Repatriation (cultural property)
