= Pearl of Kuwait =

Pearl owned by Symbolic & Chase

The Pearl of Kuwait is a pearl that was bought in 2004 by its current owners, Bond Street, London jewellers Symbolic & Chase, and named the Pearl of Kuwait in recognition of the Persian Gulf waters in which many pearls have been found. It measures 258.12 grains (64.5 carats, 69.8 carats with its diamond cap) making it the third-largest (documented) well-formed natural pearl drop.

In 2004, a large pearl named the Pearl of Kuwait was consigned by an undisclosed private family for auction at Christie's in London. The Pearl of Kuwait was part of the Pearls exhibition at the Victoria and Albert Museum in London, which closed on 19 January 2014. Its owners have made claims that it is the Tudor pearl depicted in the portraits of Mary I of England.

The pearl is currently on loan to the Smithsonian, who make no claims of its history or provenance. The Smithsonian does say that it is exceptional, that it weighs 64.4 carats, that its setting is 19th century in style, and that the pearl itself recalls those that originate from the Persian Gulf.
