= Mary Tudor pearl =

Pearl featured in three portraits of Queen Mary I of England

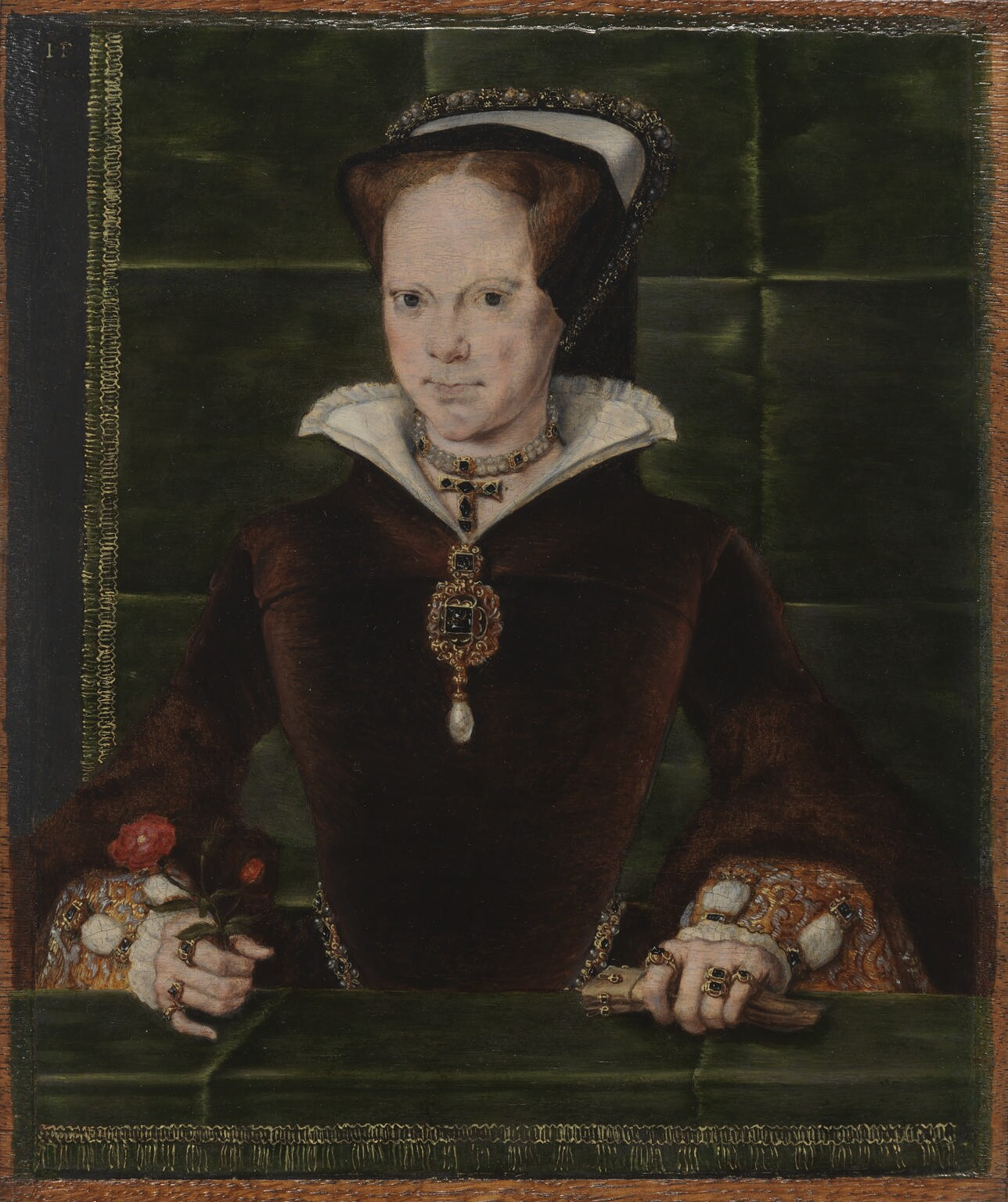
Mary I and the Tudor pearl Hans Eworth 1554

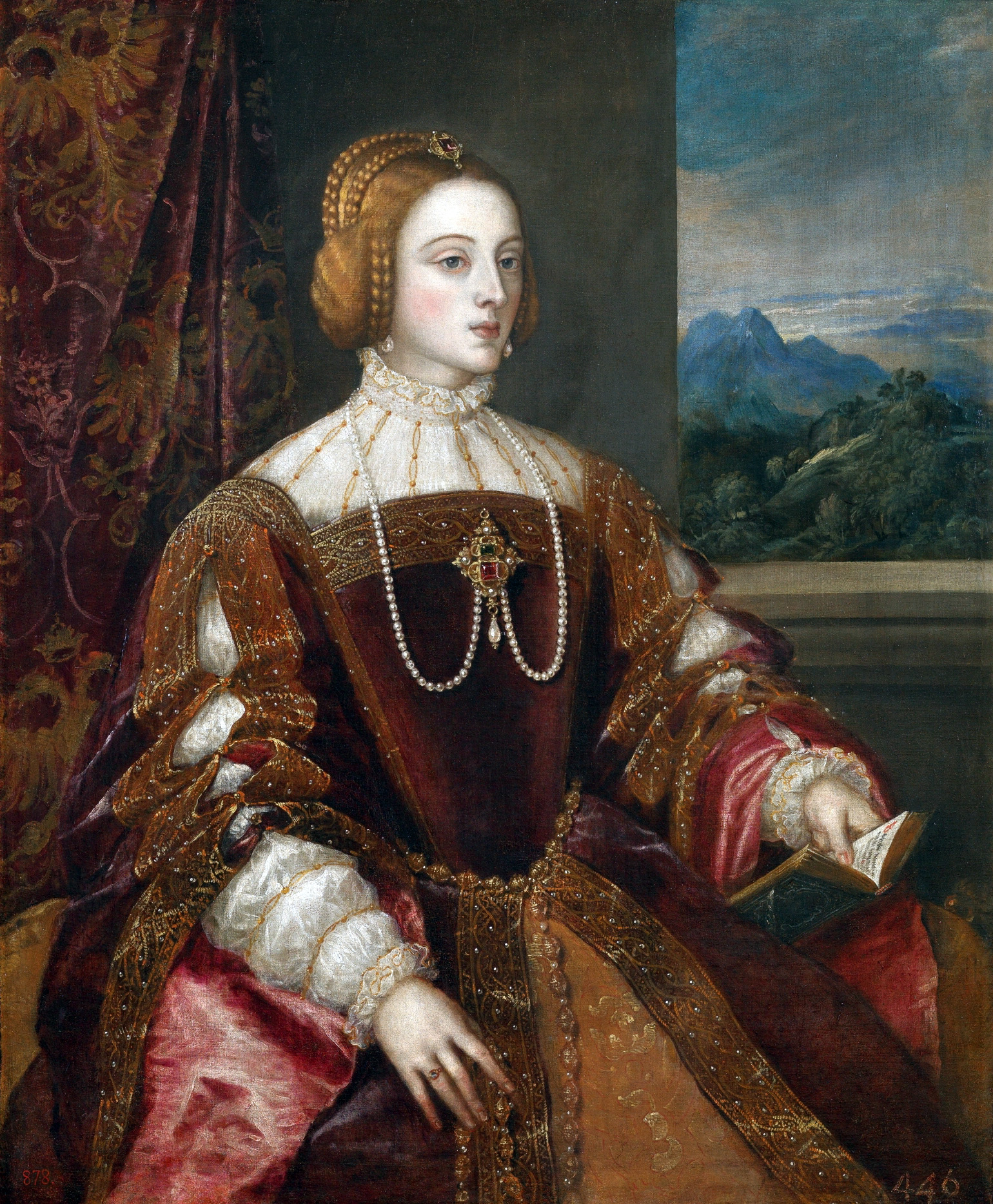
Isabella of Portugal probably wearing the pearl

The Mary Tudor pearl or simply The Tudor pearl is an asymmetrical drop-shaped pearl featured in at least three portraits of Queen Mary I of England and estimated to be 64.5 carats, 258 grains in weight and dated to 1526. It is often mistakenly depicted as the La Peregrina pearl, however, Mary Tudor could never have worn the Peregrina as it was first recorded in 1579, 21 years after her death.

The Tudor Pearl disappeared in the late 16th century. A similar pearl was sold at auction in 2004 by London jewellers Symbolic & Chase and named the Pearl of Kuwait, whose owners have made claims that it is the Tudor Pearl due to similarities in shape and size. This pearl is currently on loan to the Smithsonian, who make no claims of its history or provenance.

== History ==
The Tudor pearl was found around 1526 and was given to Isabella of Portugal. When Isabella died in 1539, she bequeathed it to her daughter, Juana of Austria. It was then sent to Mary I as part of the negotiations for her marriage to Juana's brother, Philip of Spain and is seen in contemporary portraits, suspended from a circular golden brooch. In Mary's will, she specifies other gems Philip gave her, including large diamonds but does not mention the pearl.

A 1554 portrait of Mary I by Hans Eworth, which prominently shows The Tudor pearl, was owned by Elizabeth Taylor and Richard Burton when they mistakenly believed it depicted the La Peregrina pearl which Burton had recently gifted his wife for Valentine's Day. When the Burtons discovered that the British National Portrait Gallery didn't have an original painting of Mary, they donated their recent acquisition.
