= Hans of Antwerp =

Goldsmith in Tudor London

- Born: Jan van der Goes c. 1497; Antwerp
- Died: After 1 July 1550 (aged 52–53); London
- Other names: John of Antwerp
- Occupation: Goldsmith

Hans of Antwerp (c. 1497 – after 1 July 1550) was a goldsmith and merchant working in Tudor London. He supplied silver plate and jewels to the court of Henry VIII.

== Career ==
Hans (or John) of Antwerp, whose real name was Jan van der Goes, was born about 1497. He arrived in London in around 1511 and later "married an English wife, by whom he had many children". He may have been "John Goldsmith, the Ducheman," who was making a piece for the Earl of Shrewsbury in 1516.

In 1528 four of his apprentices were admitted into the Goldsmiths' Company as freemen. He was not yet a freeman of the company, but was censured by the Goldsmiths' Company for not having his work hallmarked. In 1536 he was briefly imprisoned for employing a foreign craftsman without the permission of the company. In 1537 he was made a freeman by the intervention of Thomas Cromwell. He was employed by Cromwell as a goldsmith and court courier, and was used extensively by him from 1537 to 1539. In 1537 "Johan of Andwarpe" sold "goldsmith's works" to Princess Mary.

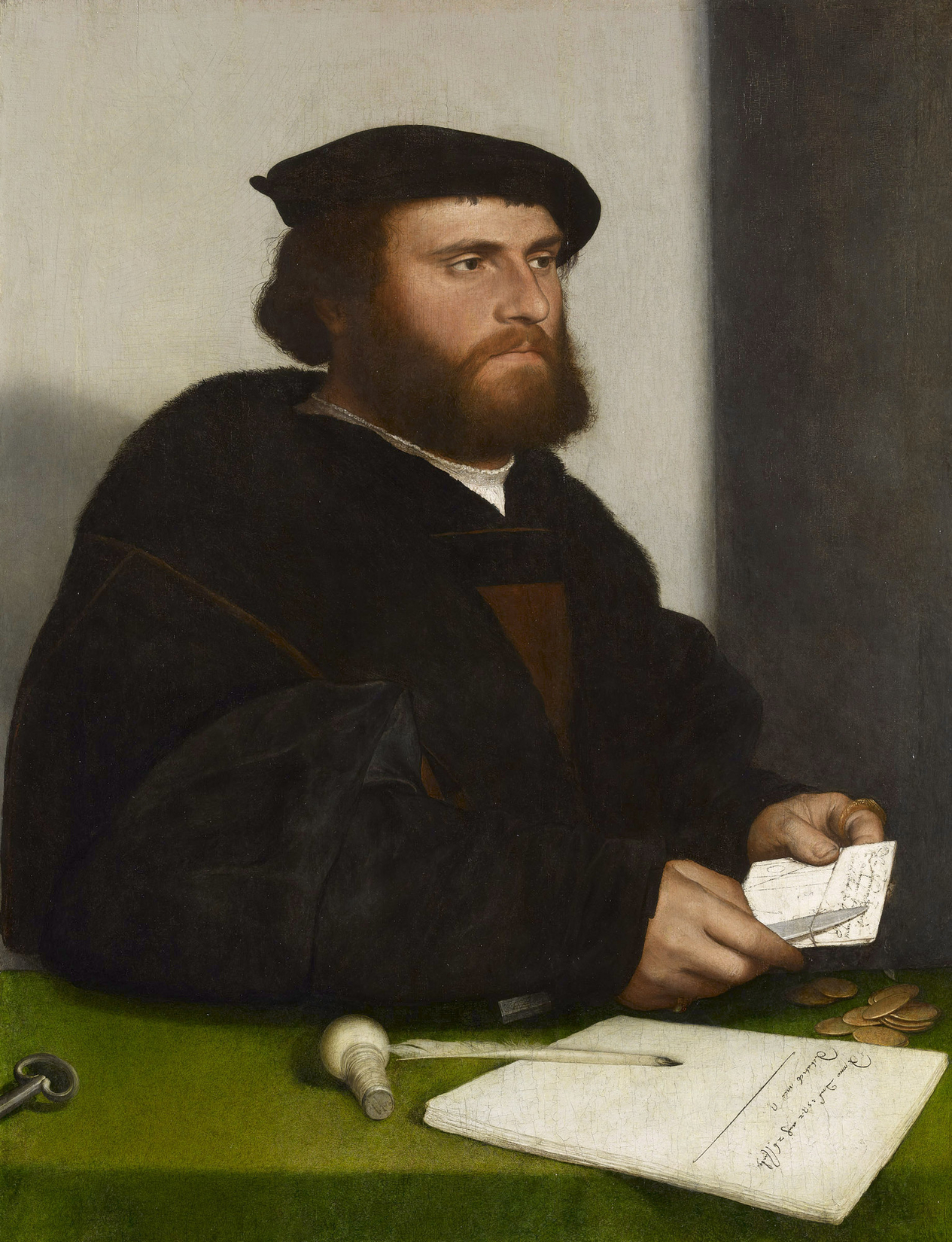
A Merchant of the German Steelyard, called Hans of Antwerp, c. 1532, Hans Holbein the Younger

A portrait by Hans Holbein the Younger dated 1532 in the Royal Collection, and a portrait miniature in the V&A have been sometime been identified as him. "Holbein had portrayed Van der Gow in 1532, firmly documenting the goldsmith's association with the Steelyard by naming it in the inscription on the letter held in the sitter's hands."

On 7 October 1543 Hans was one of four men who witnessed Hans Holbein's will. Holbein owed him £6. On 29 November he appeared before John Croke in the Commissary Court to execute his late friend's will.

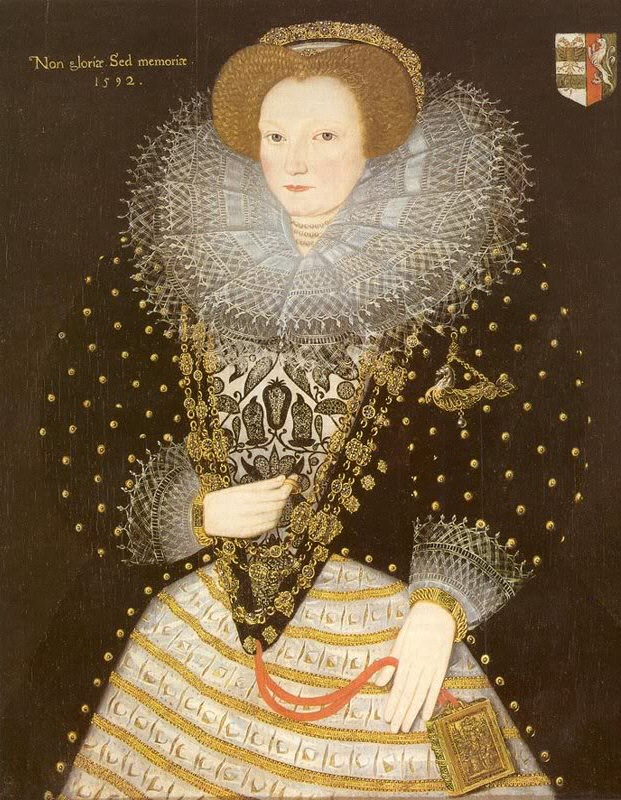
A portrait from 1592 depicts a woman wearing a girdle book

A gold girdle book cover in the British Museum is attributed to him. The enamelled inscriptions follow (with some errors) the Great Bible of 1539. It depicts in enamel the story of the brazen serpent on one side, and on the other, the Judgement of Solomon. The girdle book's original contents were replaced with a 1574 edition of Elizabeth Tyrwhitt's Morning and Evening Prayers.

A similar girdle book is depicted in a 1592 portrait of Elizabeth, Philippa, or Joan Speke from Somerset, evidently wearing a treasured heirloom. Traditionally, Anne Boleyn was said to have given girdle books to her gentlewomen.

In 1547, Hans worked with another goldsmith, Peter Anderson, to supply gilt plate to Henry VIII.

The date of his death is unknown. An entry in the register of the church of St Nicholas Acons, in Lombard Street, of the burial, in 1550, of Hans of Antwerp's 7-year-old son is the last record of his life: "1550, July 1, Augustine Andwarpe, soonne of John Andwarpe"

== Bibliography ==
- Black, William Henry; Franks, Augustus Wollaston (1863). "Discovery of the Will of Hans Holbein". Archaeologia. 39.
- Cleland, Elizabeth; Eaker, Adam; Wieseman, Marjorie E.; Bochicchio, Sarah (2022). The Tudors: Art and Majesty in Renaissance England. New York: Metropolitan Museum of Art. p. 130. ISBN 9781588396921.
- Cust, Lionel (February 1906). "John of Antwerp, Goldsmith, and Hans Holbein". The Burlington Magazine for Connoisseurs. 8 (35): 356, 359–360. JSTOR 856592.
- Debrett's Peerage Limited; Victoria and Albert Museum (1980). Princely Magnificence: Court Jewels of the Renaissance, 1500-1630: 15th October-1st February 1981. London: Debrett's Peerage for the Victoria and Albert Museum. ISBN 978-0-905649-42-9.
- Foister, Susan (2006). Holbein in England. London: Tate. ISBN 1854376454.
- Glanville, Philippa (2006). Silver in England. London: Routledge. ISBN 0415382157.
- James, Susan E. (2016). The Feminine Dynamic in English Art 1485-1603 : Women As Consumers Patrons and Painters. London: Routledge. p. 28. ISBN 9781138253018.
- Lodge, Edmund (1791). Illustrations of British History, Biography, and Manners in the Reigns of Henry VIII, Edward VI, Mary, Elizabeth, and James I. Vol. 1. London.
- Madden, Frederick (1831). Privy Purse Expenses of the Princess Mary, Daughter of King Henry the Eighth, Afterwards Queen. London: William Pickering.
- Moyle, Franny (2021). The King's Painter: The Life and Times of Hans Holbein. London: Head of Zeus. ISBN 9781788541206.
- Norris, Herbert (1998). Tudor Costume and Fashion. With a new introduction written by Richard Martin (new ed.). New York: Dover Publications. ISBN 0486298450.
- Tait, Hugh (1985). "The Girdle-prayerbook". Jewellery Studies. 2: 29–57.
- Tait, Hugh (1991). "Goldsmiths and their Work at the Court of Henry VIII". In Starkey, David (ed.). Henry VIII: A European Court in England. London: Collins & Brown. pp. 112–117. ISBN 1855850087.
- Thorpe, Vanessa (14 October 2012). "X-rays reveal true identity of subject in Holbein portrait". The Observer.
- Wilson, Derek (2006). Hans Holbein: Portrait of an Unknown Man (revised ed.). London: Pimlico. ISBN 0714823589.
