= La Peregrina pearl =

Pearl formerly owned by Spanish monarchs

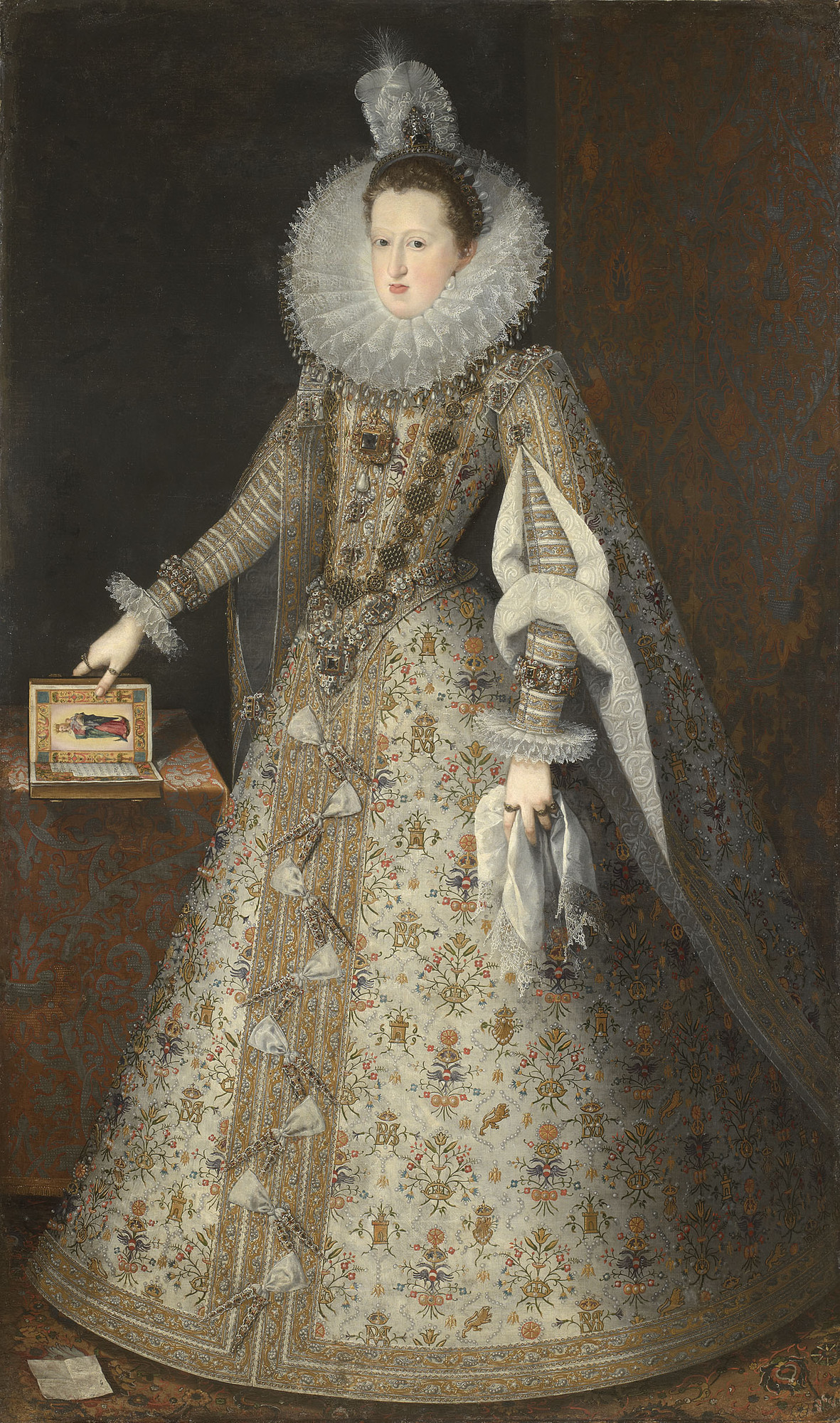
Juan Pantoja de la Cruz, Margaret of Austria, Queen of Spain wearing the pearl (c. 1606)

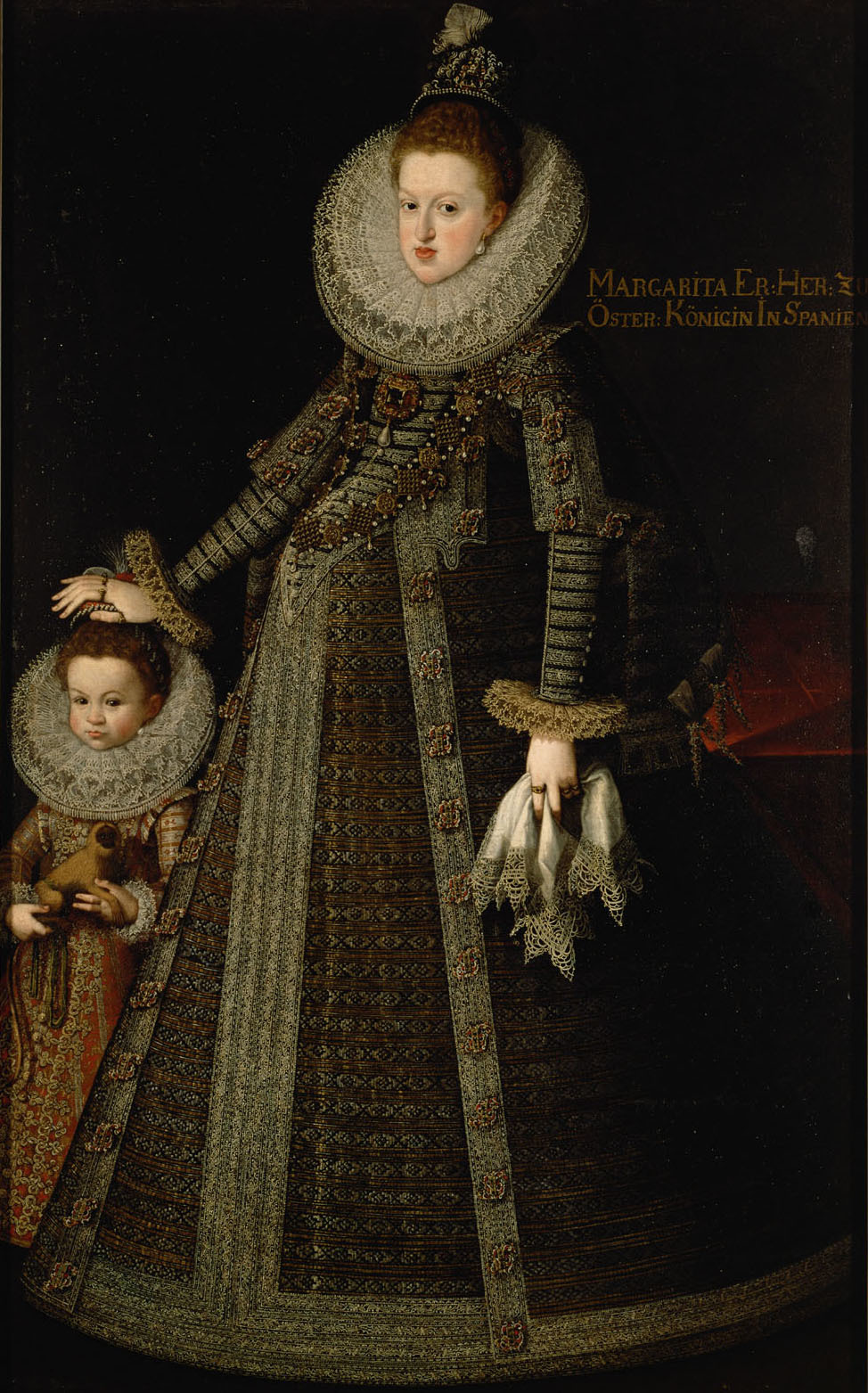
Juan Pantoja de la Cruz, Margaret of Austria, Queen of Spain wearing the pearl (c. 1606)

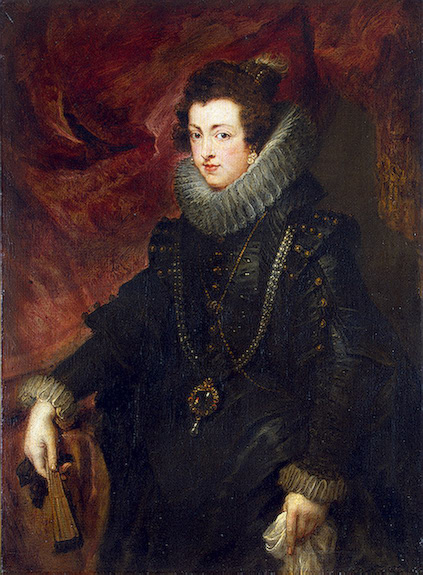
Peter Paul Rubens, Elisabeth of France, Queen of Spain wearing the pearl (c. 1625)

The La Peregrina pearl is one of the most famous pearls in the world. Its owners include the Spanish monarchs, the history of the pearl spans almost 500 years and recently belonged to actress Elizabeth Taylor. The jewel is now in private ownership.

== Origin of name ==
La Peregrina is the Spanish word for female pilgrim or wanderer.

== Physical characteristics ==
The original weight of this pear-shaped pearl was 223.8 grains, (55.95 carats, 11.2 g, almost .4 oz.). At the time of its discovery, it was the largest pearl ever found. In 1913 the pearl had to be drilled and cleaned to secure it firmly to its setting. After drilling and cleaning, the pearl's weight decreased to 203.84 grains. La Peregrina remains one of the largest perfectly symmetrical pear-shaped pearls in the world.

== History ==
The first reference to this pearl can be found in Commentarios Reales de Los Incas by historian Garcilaso de la Vega (1539–1616). He tells of an exceptional pear-shaped pearl, which was brought back to Spain from Panama. It was found by an African slave in the Pearl Islands in 1513 and was turned over to Don Pedro de Temez, who was the administrator of Panama at the time. Temez later gifted the pearl to King Philip II of Spain (1527–1598). Later, in his testament, King Philip elevated the pearl to the rank of a Spanish Crown Jewel, and from then on it is recorded in every royal inventory for more than 200 years.

It became one of the favorite ornaments for the Spanish queens of that time. Margaret of Austria wore the pearl for the celebration of the peace treaty between Spain and England in 1605. Portraits made by Diego Velázquez are evidence that the pearl was prized by both Elisabeth of France and Mariana of Austria. The equestrian portrait of Queen Elisabeth shows her wearing the pearl. Queen Mariana, her successor, was painted with the pearl as well.

In his biography of Louis XIV, Michel de Grèce claims that King Philip IV of Spain wore what later became known as La Peregrina in his hat at the proxy wedding of his daughter Maria Theresa of Spain to Louis at Fontarrabie in June 1660. However, this appears to have been a different pearl, later called La Pelegrina.

In 1808 the elder brother of Napoleon, Joseph Bonaparte, was installed as king of Spain. His rule continued for five years, and when he was forced to leave the kingdom, after the defeat of the French forces at the Battle of Vitoria, he took some of the crown jewels with him, including La Peregrina. At that time, the pearl got its name "La Peregrina – the Wanderer". In his will, Joseph Bonaparte left the pearl to his nephew, the future Napoleon III of France.

During his exile in England, the Emperor sold it to James Hamilton, Marquess and later Duke of Abercorn. Abercorn bought the pearl for his wife, Louisa. The pearl was very heavy and it fell out of its necklace's setting on at least two occasions. The first time, the pearl got lost in a sofa in Windsor Castle; the second time, during a ball at Buckingham Palace. On both occasions, the pearl was recovered. The Hamilton family owned the pearl until 1969, when they sold it at auction at Sotheby's in London.

Richard Burton purchased the pearl at the Sotheby's auction for $37,000 and gave it to his wife, Elizabeth Taylor, as a Valentine's Day gift. On one occasion, the pearl went missing in the Burtons' suite at Caesars Palace, Paradise, Nevada. In her book Elizabeth Taylor: My Love Affair with Jewelry, Taylor describes losing the piece and thinking her puppy was chewing it. She found it inside his mouth: "It was—thank God—not scratched."

Burton sought a portrait of Mary I of England wearing the pearl, in the mistaken belief that the pearl had once belonged to her, even though La Peregrina was first recorded in 1579, 21 years after Mary's death. The pearl shown in Mary I portraits is The Tudor Pearl, which is 53.57 grains larger than La Peregrina. After the purchase of a painting, the Burtons discovered that the British National Portrait Gallery did not have an original painting of Mary, so they donated their recent acquisition to the Gallery.

Taylor commissioned Cartier to re-design the necklace, setting La Peregrina with pearls, diamonds, and rubies. In 2005, Taylor lent it to the Smithsonian Institution for its "The Allure of Pearls" exhibition.

In December 2011, the pearl sold for a record price of more than $11 million (£7.1m). La Peregrina was sold as part of Elizabeth Taylor's collection, which was being auctioned at Christie's in New York. It was sold mounted on the diamond Cartier necklace. Its value had been estimated at $3 million, but the bidding vastly exceeded the estimate and reached $10.5 million – increasing to more than $11 million once the various fees were factored in.
