= Death and funeral of Mary I =

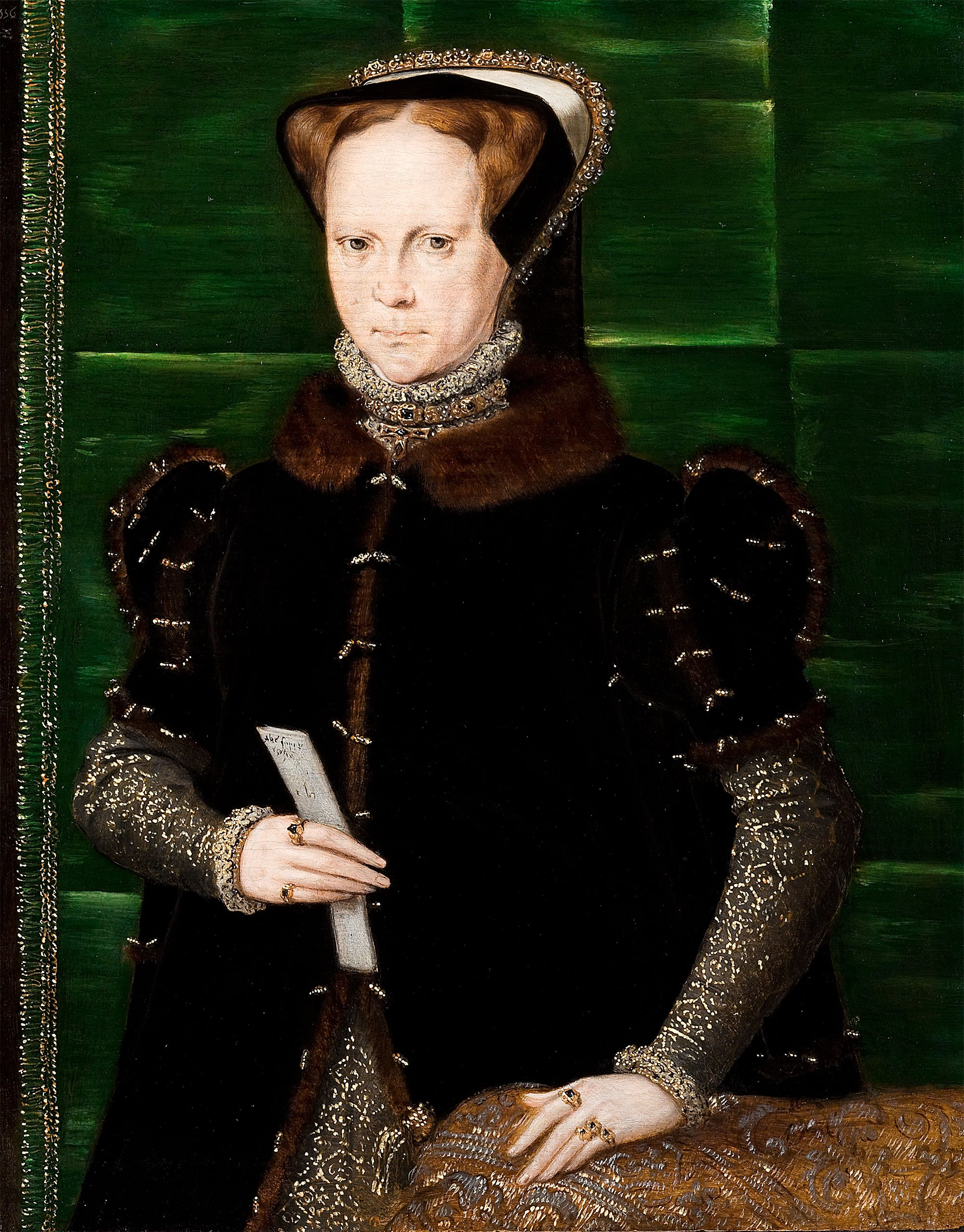
Mary I, Hans Eworth

Queen Mary I of England died on 17 November 1558 at St James's Palace in Westminster. She was 42 years old. Mary was buried in Westminster Abbey on 14 December.

== Privy chamber ==
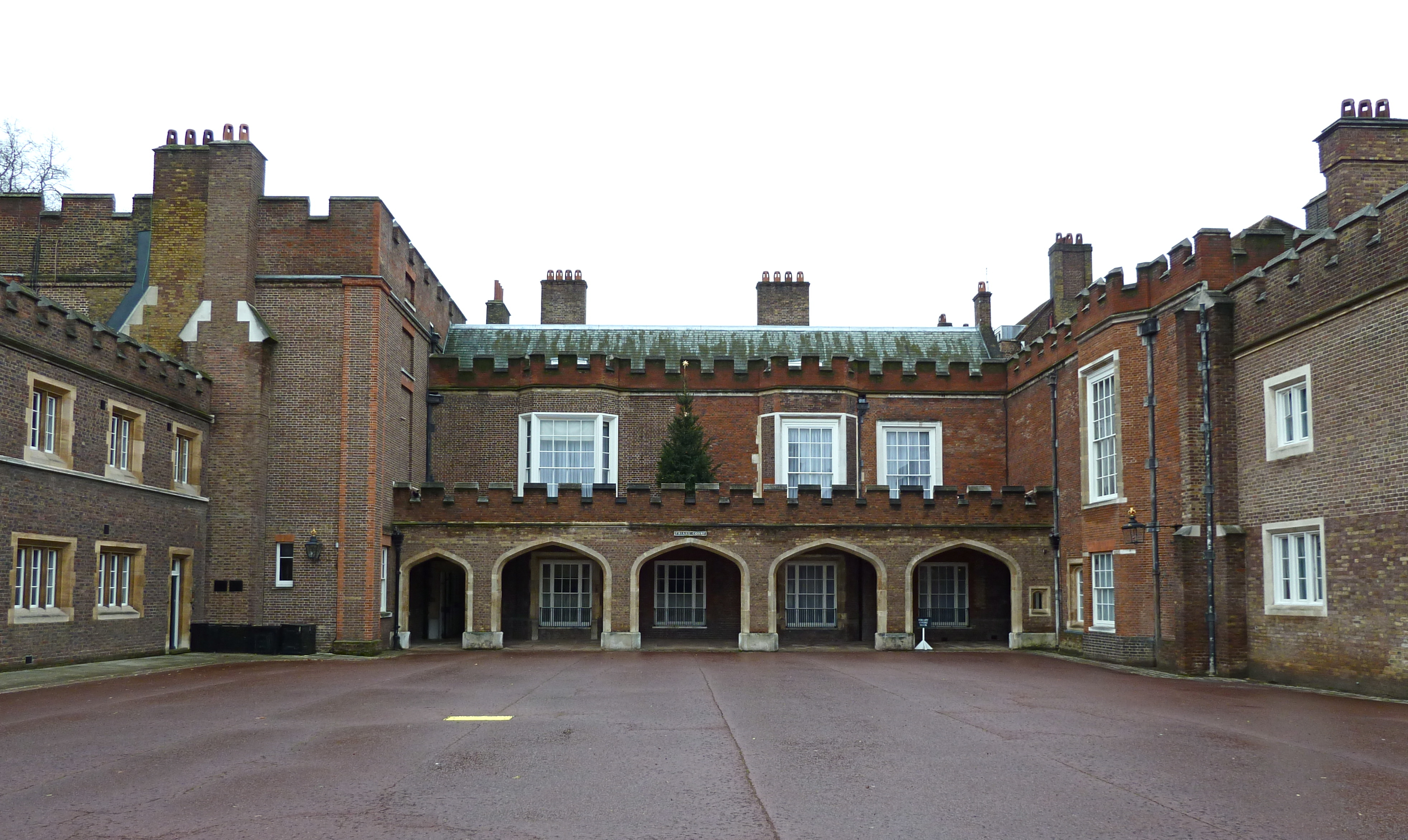
Mary lay in state at St James's Palace

According to Jane Dormer, Mary came to Westminster from Hampton Court at the end of August. She asked Dormer if she had recovered from her illness, a form of influenza called the "quartan ague", Dormer said she was well. Mary replied, "So am not I".

On 28 October, Mary added a codicil to her will, witnessed by her physician Thomas Wendy and others, which indicated that her half-sister Elizabeth would be her successor. The sickbed was attended by an old servant, the chamberer Edith Brediman. The nature of Mary's final illness is uncertain.

A decade after her death, Richard Grafton wrote that the loss of Calais to the French was the source of a depression, "an inward sorrow of mind", which led to her succumbing to a prevalent fever. According to the writer John Foxe, her servants Susan Clarencieux and "Master Ryse" heard Mary regret the loss of Calais. Foxe claimed to have heard this from friends of Mr Ryse, and the story has been dismissed as "courtly gossip".

The identity of "Mr Ryse" is uncertain. It has been suggested that Foxe's (alleged) source was Lady Mansel, the wife of Rice Mansel, who died in September 1558. The usher John Norris listed a "Mr Rice" as a Gentleman of the Queen's Privy Chamber, who also appears in the 1557 gift roll. This was William Rice, husband of Barbara Ryce, a chamberer. David and Beatrice ap Rice were also servants of Mary.

After Mary died, shortly after Mass in the morning, her coronation ring was taken to Elizabeth at Hatfield House. Nicholas Throckmorton is said to have told Elizabeth of her sister's death. According to a poem, he brought a token of another of Mary's rings, a ring with black enamel decoration which was her espousal ring. In 1559, Blanche Parry noted that Elizabeth owned a ruby ring sent to her by Mary as token.

Mary's body was embalmed with spices and sealed in a lead coffin. Her heart was placed in a separate coffin "covered with velvet bound with silver". It was later said that important state papers and accounts in Mary's chamber were destroyed when they were used in the making of her cerecloth, in "cering the corse".

The coffin lay in state on a trestle table covered with cloth of gold in the Privy Chamber of the palace, which was draped with black cloth decorated with escutcheons of her heraldry and the arms of Philip II of Spain conjoined, and her arms displayed in the Order of the Garter. Some of her gentlewomen kept vigil, day and night, until 10 December, when the coffin was taken to the palace chapel. Margaret Douglas, Countess of Lennox was the Chief Mourner.

In France, Mary, Queen of Scots, Queen Consort of France, wore white mourning clothes for Mary I, known as dueil blanc. The custom suggested that she saw herself as Mary's successor.

== Chapel in St James's Palace ==
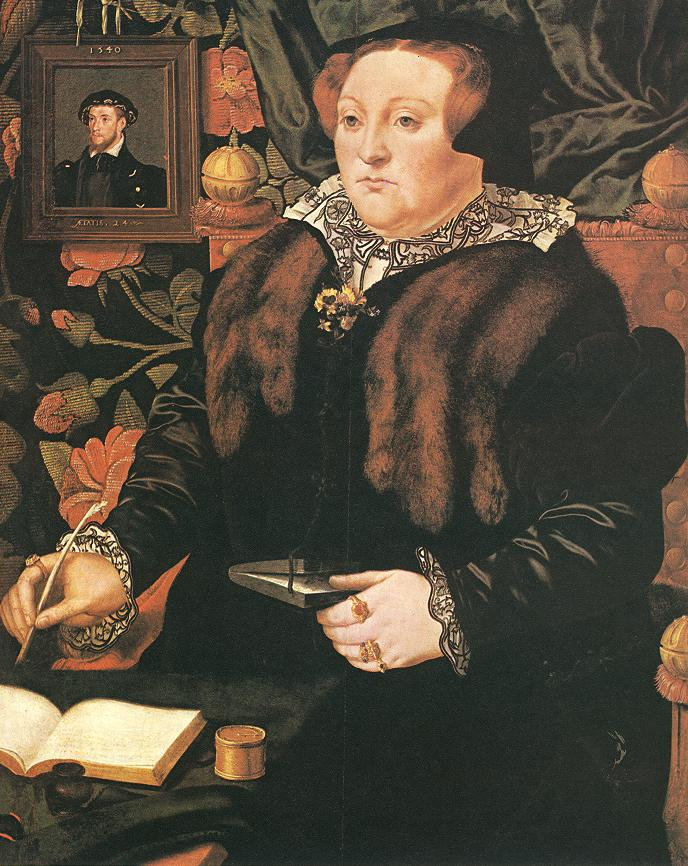
Mary Fiennes née Neville, Lady Dacre of the South, took part in the funeral procession, dressed in mourning clothes.

The chapel was also draped with black cloth and heraldry, like the privy chamber. The coffin was placed on a richly decorated stage with candles known as a "hearse". At its roof level, supported on six posts, there was a valance, like a bed, which was inscribed with a motto in letters of gold, the "queen's word". The body was brought into the chapel during a ceremony conducted by four bishops and the Queen's Chapel of choristers. After the ceremony, the aristocratic mourners enjoyed a "great supper". Saturday concluded with a "solemn watch" over the body. On Sunday there was a Requiem Mass.

== Westminster Abbey ==
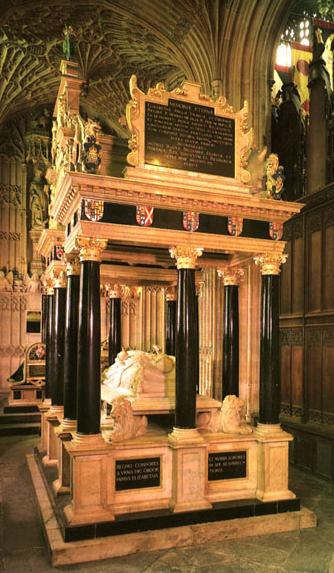
Elizabeth I's monument at Westminster Abbey commemorates the two sisters by an inscription

The body was taken on a chariot to Westminster Abbey on Tuesday 13 December, after dinner. There was a lifelike effigy of Mary on the chariot, possibly sculpted by Niccolo da Modena and painted by Nicholas Lizard. The effigy survives but seems not to be of high quality. It has joints in the limbs, which would help with dressing and also allow some different postures. Some accounts of the funeral call the effigy a "representation" or "presentation", dressed in crimson velvet robes of state with a crown, orb and sceptre, the fingers richly set with rings.

There was a procession. The chief mourner was Margaret Douglas, Countess of Lennox. The Countesses of Oxford, Worcester, Huntingdon, and Bristol followed on horseback. Next, a chariot drawn by four horses carried Viscountess Montague and Lady Clinton, Lady Morley, and Lady Dacre of the South, followed by four more ladies riding, another chariot, and another group of four riders, Lady Cornwallis, Lady Jerningham (Frances Baynham), Lady Petre, and Mrs Dormer. A third chariot carried ladies of the bedchamber, Susan Clarencieux, Mistress Sibille Penne (a former nurse to Edward VI), Mistress Tynnes, and Mistress Southwell (Mary Jerningham), the remaining gentlewomen, waiters, and chamberers, all dressed in black, followed on horseback.

Another hearse in the Abbey was decorated with the motto "Dieu Et Mon Droit". The painter Nicholas Lizard made a dome for the hearse with pictures of the four evangelists. Mary was buried on the north side of Henry VII's chapel on 14 December after a Requiem Mass. The funeral sermon was given by John White, Bishop of Winchester. Her officers broke their staffs or wands of office and threw them in the grave.

== Monument ==
James VI and I had a monument built which commemorates the burials of Mary and her sister Elizabeth I with the Latin inscription "Regno consortes et urna hic obdormimus Elizabetha et Maria sorores in spe resurrectionis" (Partners both in throne and grave, here rest we two sisters, Elizabeth and Mary, in the hope of the Resurrection).

== Legacy in history ==
Later Protestant writers who formed Anti-Catholic opinion, including John March, suggested that Mary's false pregnancies were the cause of her death. March asserted that her illness and death were the work of God.
