= Sampson Lennard =

English politician

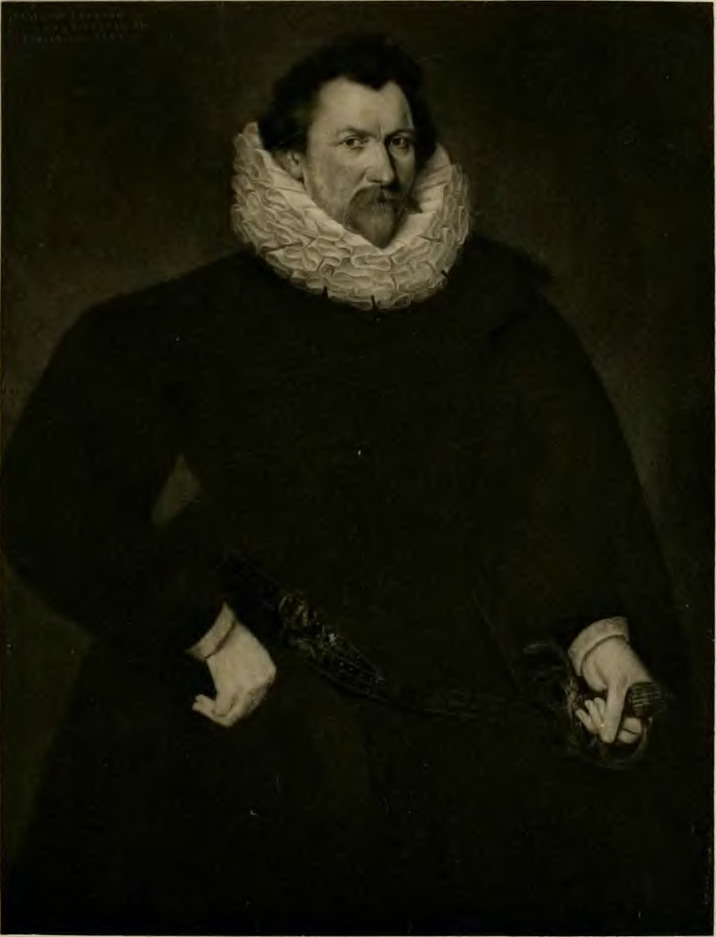

Member of the British Parliament for Launceston
- In office 1571

Member of the British Parliament for Bramber
- In office 1584–5

Member of the British Parliament for St Mawes
- In office 1586–7

Member of the British Parliament for Christchurch
- In office 1589

Member of the British Parliament for St Germans
- In office 1593

Member of the British Parliament for Rye
- In office 1597

Member of the British Parliament for Liskeard
- In office 1601

Member of the British Parliament for Sussex
- In office 1614

Personal details
- Born: c. 1544
- Died: 20 September 1615
- Spouse: Margaret Fiennes
- Children: 13, including Sir Henry Lennard

Sampson Lennard (c. 1544 – 20 September 1615), of Chevening in Kent, was an English Member of Parliament who represented an unusually large number of different constituencies during the reigns of Elizabeth I and James I.

A prominent member of the Kent and Sussex gentry, Lennard was High Sheriff of Kent in 1590–1. He entered Parliament in 1571 as member for Launceston (Cornwall). He subsequently also represented Bramber (1584–5), St Mawes (1586–7), Christchurch (1589), St Germans (1593), Rye (1597), Liskeard (1601) and Sussex (1614).

Lennard married Margaret Fiennes, daughter of Thomas Fiennes, 9th Baron Dacre, and after her brother's death in 1594 he successfully claimed the barony on her behalf, so that she became the 11th Baroness Dacre. However, "imperfections in Mr. Lennard’s precedents" meant he did not receive the title he desired.

They had thirteen children, and their younger son, Sir Henry Lennard, succeeded his mother as 12th Baron Dacre, "leaving [Sampson] Lennard to watch him enjoying the title while more land was sold to pay off debts". Sampson Lennard is buried at St. Botolph, Chevening, Kent, England

== Sources ==
- J E Neale, The Elizabethan House of Commons (London: Jonathan Cape, 1949)

Arms of Lennard: Or, on a fess gules three fleurs-de-lys of the field
