= Gregory Fiennes, 10th Baron Dacre =

English courtier

Gregory Fiennes
- Baron Dacre
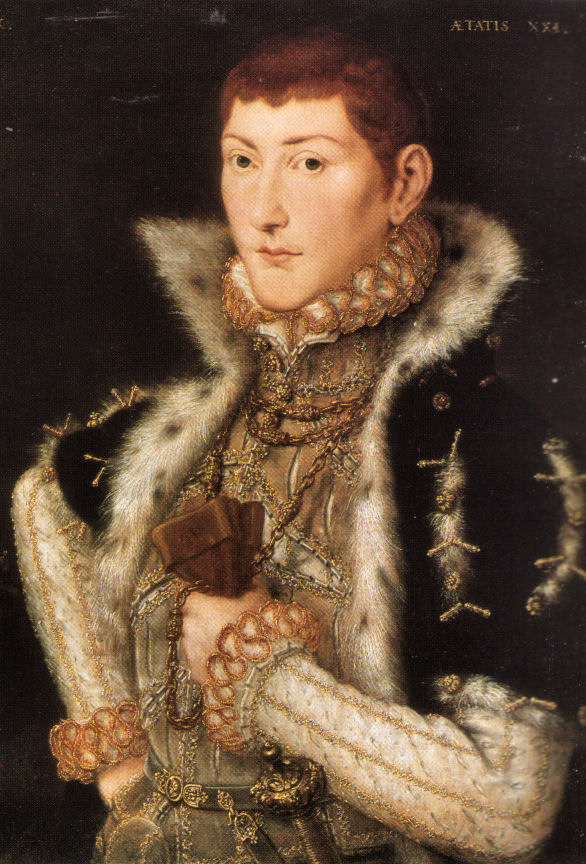
- Gregory Fiennes, 10th Baron Dacre, detail of a portrait by Hans Eworth, 1559

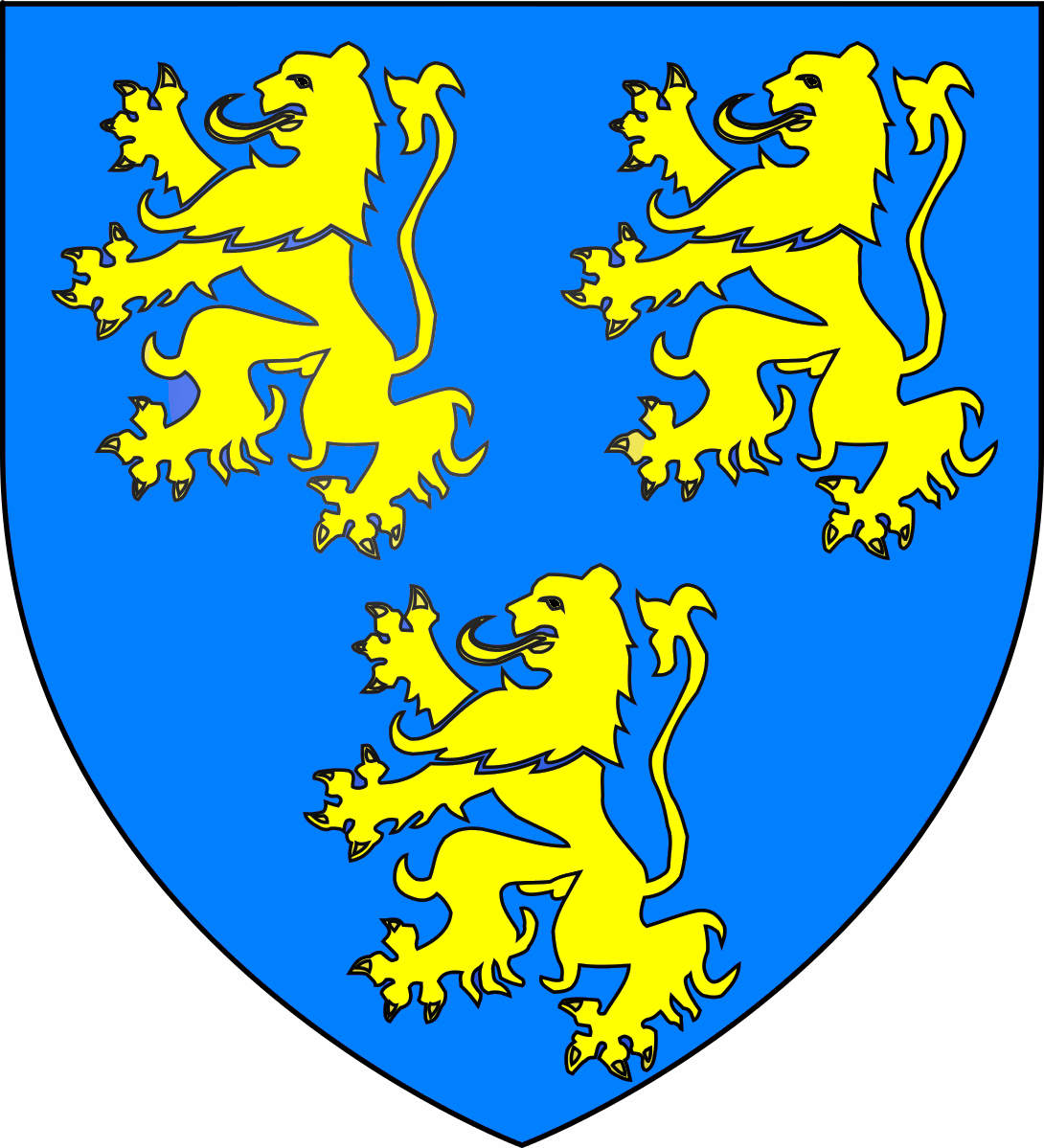
- Coat of arms
- Reign: Elizabeth I
- Predecessor: Thomas Fiennes, 9th Baron Dacre
- Successor: Margaret Fiennes, 11th Baroness Dacre
- Baptised: 25 June 1539; Herstmonceux Castle
- Died: 29 September 1594 (aged 55); Chelsea
- Buried: Chelsea Old Church
- Noble family: Fiennes
- Spouse: Anne Sackville
- Issue: Elizabeth Fiennes
- Father: Thomas Fiennes, 9th Baron Dacre
- Mother: Mary Neville

Gregory Fiennes, 10th Baron Dacre (bef. 25 June 1539 – 25 September 1594) was an English courtier.

He was the son of Thomas Fiennes, 9th Baron Dacre (c. 1515–1541) and Mary Neville. He was baptized at Hurstmonceux, Sussex, on 25 June 1539 and he may have been named after Thomas Cromwell's son, Gregory.

His father was convicted of the murder of a gamekeeper and hanged like a common criminal at Tyburn in 1541, and in the aftermath, the family was stripped of its lands and titles by Henry VIII.

In the following years, his mother battled to have the properties restored on behalf of her children, and on her ascension in 1558, Queen Elizabeth restored the title of Baron Dacre to Gregory, his elder brother Thomas having died of the plague at age 15.

Gregory Fiennes is a sitter with his mother in a significant portrait by Hans Eworth.

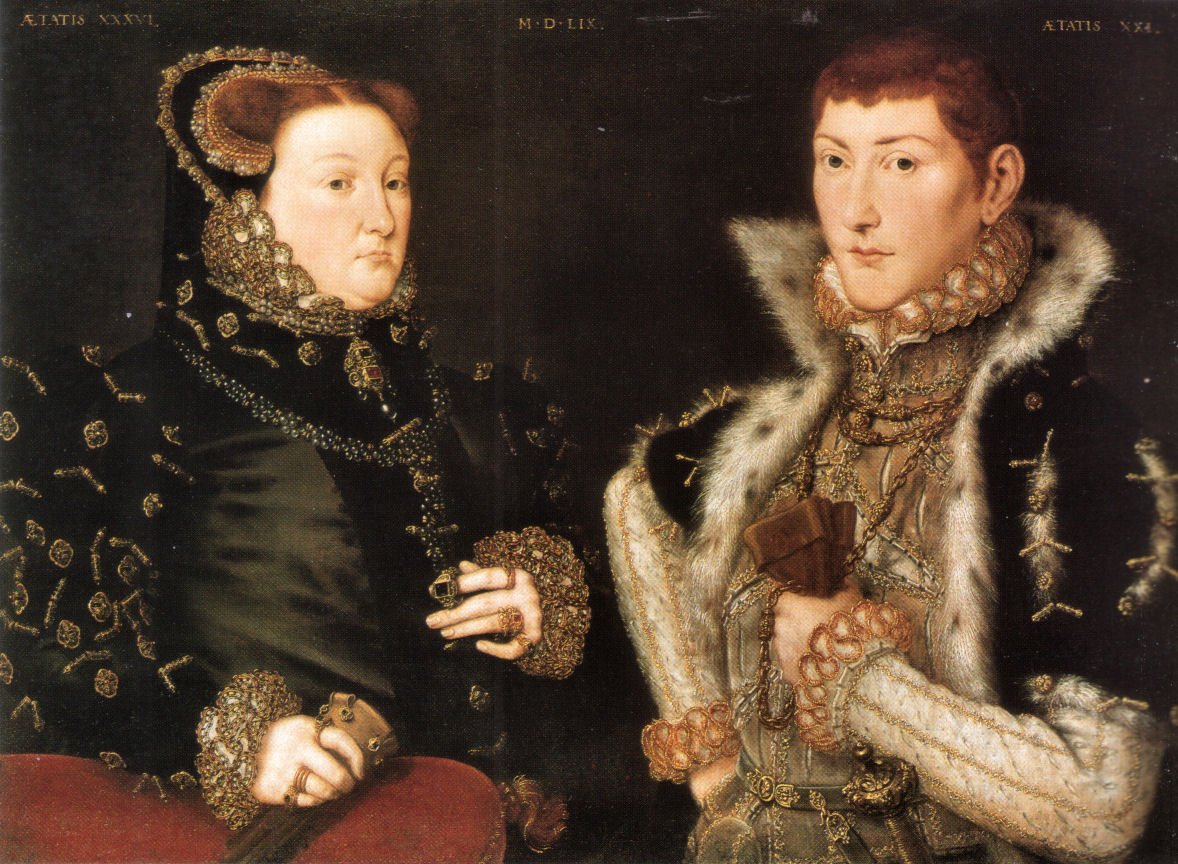
Mary Nevill or Neville, Baroness Dacre, and her son Gregory Fiennes, 10th Baron Dacre, 1559, by Hans Eworth

In 1565, he married Anne Sackville (d. 1595), daughter of Sir Richard Sackville and Winifred Brydges. They had one daughter, Elizabeth, who died young.

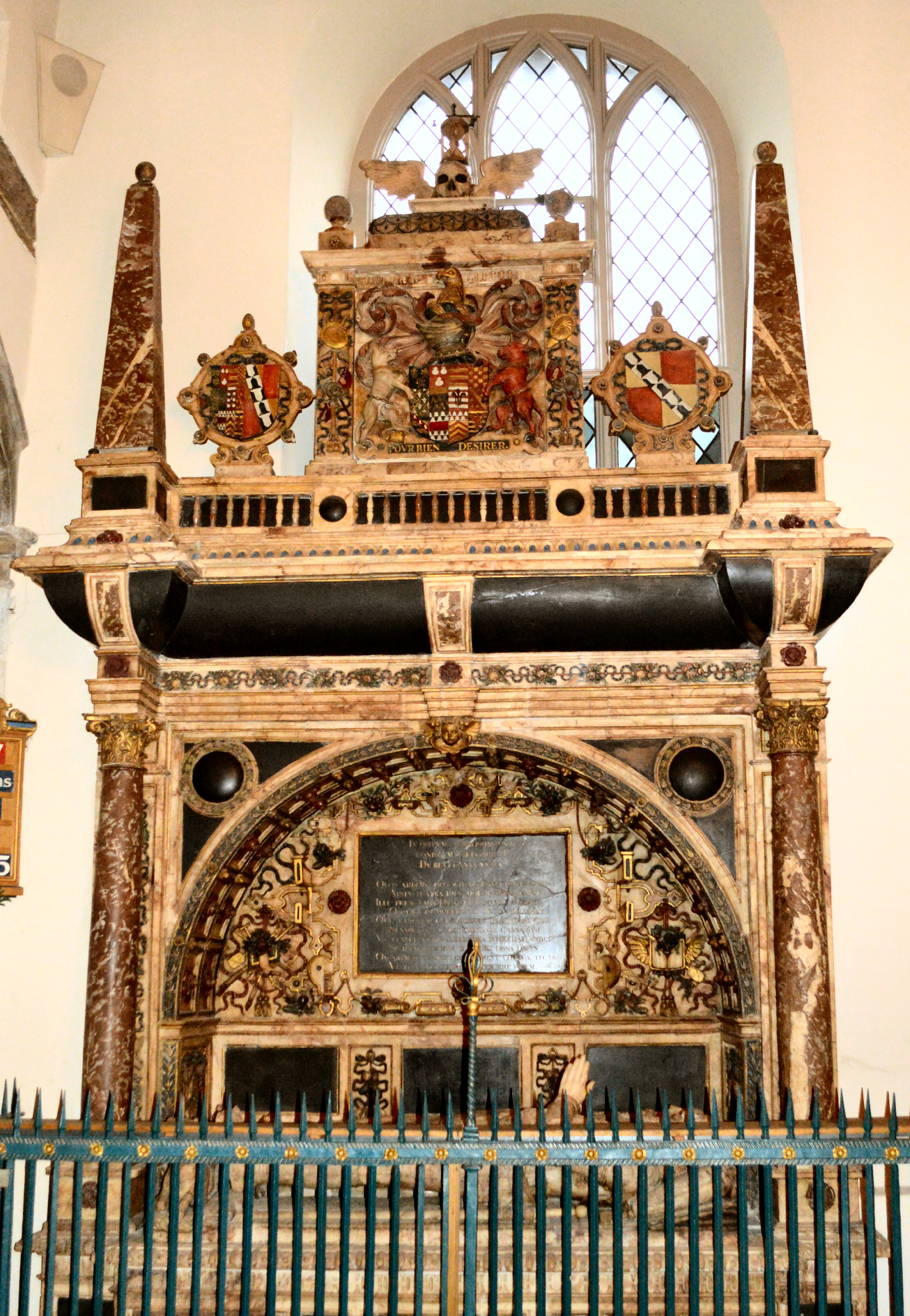
Chelsea Old Church, Dacre Monument (1595) to Gregory Fiennes, Lord Dacre of the south, and his wife Ann Sackville

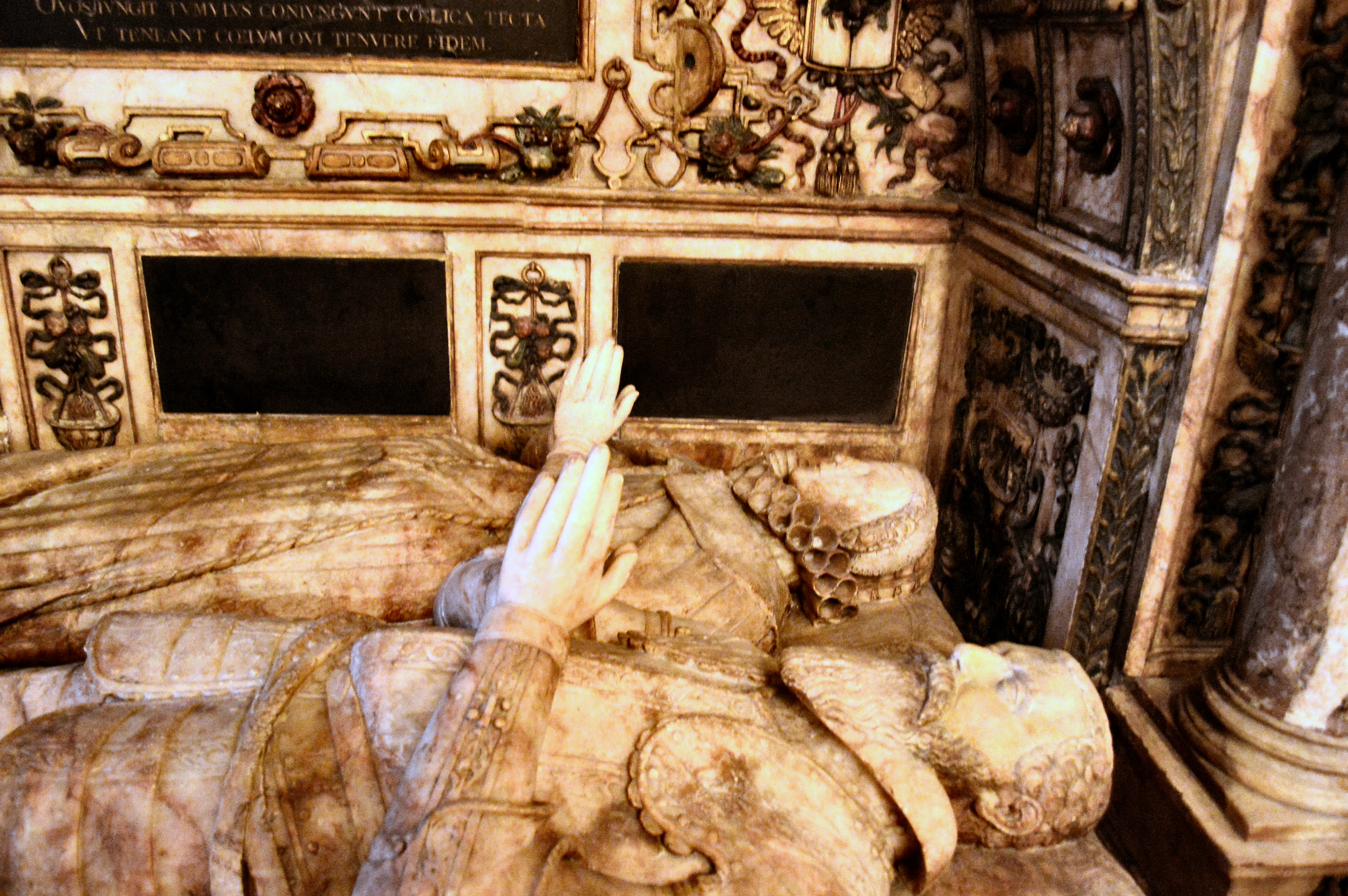
Chelsea Old Church, Dacre monument detail

He died on 25 September 1594 at Chelsea and is buried at Chelsea Old Church within a magnificent marble tomb with his wife and daughter. He was succeeded by his sister Margaret Fiennes, 11th Baroness Dacre.

== Notes ==
Peerage of England
Preceded by Thomas Fiennes, 9th Baron Dacre	Baron Dacre; 1558–1594	Succeeded by Margaret Fiennes, 11th Baroness Dacre
