= Margaret Fiennes, 11th Baroness Dacre =

English noblewoman

Margaret Fiennes
- suo jure Baroness Dacre
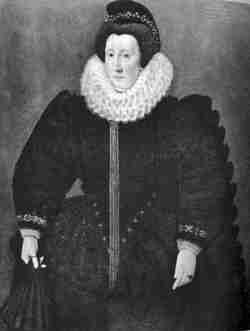
- Born: 1541
- Died: March 16, 1612 (aged 70–71)
- Noble family: Fiennes (by birth)
- Spouse: Sampson Lennard
- Issue: John Lennard; Henry Lennard, 12th Baron Dacre; Anne Lennard; Elizabeth Lennard; Elizabeth Lennard; Gregory "George" Lennard; Mary Lennard; Thomas Lennard; Margaret Lennard; Frances Lennard; John Lennard
- Father: Thomas Fiennes, 9th Baron Dacre
- Mother: Mary Neville

Margaret Fiennes, 11th Baroness Dacre (1541 – 16 March 1612) was a suo jure peeress having been created Baroness Dacre by King James I of England in 1604. She was the daughter of Thomas Fiennes, 9th Baron Dacre who was executed for murder in the year of her birth. His title and lands had been forfeited to the crown. Baroness Margaret's husband was Sampson Lennard MP.

She was also known as Baroness Dacre of the South.

== Family ==
Margaret was born in 1541, the youngest child and only daughter of Thomas Fiennes, 9th Baron Dacre and Mary Neville. In the year of her birth, her father was hanged for the murder of a gamekeeper by the order of King Henry VIII, and his lands and title were forfeited to the crown.

== Marriage and issue ==
On 10 November 1564 at the age of 23, Margaret married Sampson Lennard (died 1615), who came from a family of landed gentry. They resided at Chevening, Kent. He was a Member of Parliament for various constituencies, and from 1590 to 1591, he held the post of High Sheriff of Kent. Lady Dacre and her husband had five sons and six daughters: Occurring in Sevenoaks, Kent, England unless otherwise stated:

- John Lennard, born 1567; buried 10 Oct 1575.
- Sir Henry Lennard, 12th Baron Dacre (25 March 1570 - 8 August 1616); Born in Chevening, Kent, England; married Chrysogona Baker, by whom he had issue.
- Anne Lennard, born 1 Aug 1572 Chevening, Kent; married Herbert Morley.
- Elizabeth Lennard, born 5 Jun 1580; buried 20 Oct 1581.
- Elizabeth Lennard, born 26 Nov 1581; married Sir Francis Barnham, by whom she had issue.
- Gregory "George" Lennard, born 25 Oct 1573 Chevening, Kent; married in 1614 to Maud Llewellyn. Died 1620, without issue.
- Mary Lennard, born 22 Oct 1574 Chevening, Kent; married Sir Ralph Bosville.
- Thomas Lennard, died 1638 without issue (d.s.p).
- Margaret Lennard, born 28 Sep 1578; married Sir Thomas Waller, by whom she had issue, including Parliamentarian soldier Sir William Waller.
- Frances Lennard, born 28 Jul 1583; married Sir Robert More
- John Lennard, born 11 Oct 1584; died bef. 1615.

== Baroness Dacre ==
The title of Baron Dacre had been restored to Margaret's brother Gregory by Queen Elizabeth I shortly after her ascension to the throne; however, upon his death in 1594, it had once again lapsed in abeyance. On 8 December 1604, King James I created her suo jure Baroness Dacre, and she held this title until her death on 16 March 1612. She was succeeded by her eldest son, Henry.

== In literature and art ==
- Between 1595 and 1600 her portrait was painted by Marcus Gheeraerts the Younger.
- A character loosely based on Lady Dacre can be found in the 1993 novella Candlemass Road by George MacDonald Fraser.

== Ancestry ==
Ancestors of Margaret Fiennes, 11th Baroness Dacre

16. Sir John Fiennes
8. Thomas Fiennes, 8th Baron Dacre
17. Alice FitzHugh
4. Sir Thomas Fiennes
18. Sir Humphrey Bourchier
9. Anne Bourchier
19. Elizabeth Tilney, Countess of Surrey
2. Thomas Fiennes, 9th Baron Dacre
20. Sir Edmund Sutton
10. Edward Sutton, 2nd Baron Dudley
21. Joyce Tiptoft
5. Jane de Sutton
22. Sir William Willoughby
11. Cecily Willoughby
23. Joan Strangeways
1. Margaret Fiennes, 11th Baroness Dacre
24. Edward Neville, 3rd Baron Bergavenny
12. George Nevill, 4th Baron Bergavenny
25. Lady Elizabeth de Beauchamp
6. George Nevill, 5th Baron Bergavenny
26. Hugh Fenn
13. Margaret Fenn
27. Eleanor
3. Mary Neville
28. Henry Stafford, 2nd Duke of Buckingham
14. Edward Stafford, 3rd Duke of Buckingham
29. Lady Catherine Woodville
7. Lady Mary Stafford
30. Henry Percy, 4th Earl of Northumberland
15. Lady Eleanor Percy
31. Lady Maud Herbert

Peerage of England
Preceded by Gregory Fiennes, 10th Baron Dacre	Baron Dacre; 1594–1612	Succeeded by Henry Lennard, 12th Baron Dacre
