= Beatrice ap Rice =

Beatrice ap Rice (died 1561) was a servant of Mary I of England. She was first recorded as a laundress in 1519.

Her name was sometimes written as Beatrix a Pryce, or Beatrice Aprice. The household accounts of Lady Mary call her the "launder". She and Jane Foole were ill in 1543 while the household was at Beddington, and at Greenwich Palace.

Mary and Philip II of Spain granted her lands at Boreham in the honour of Beaulieu alias Newhall, citing her forty years in royal service. This included a holding of 30 acres known as "Bullis" or "Boles", with the "Deyhouse" and "Coggeshallfield". Beatrice was confirmed as the leaseholder on 6 November 1557, after the death of her husband.

Beatrice ap Rice was of sufficient status to be involved in the New Year gift exchange at court, perhaps as an assistant to the "mother of the maids". The surviving 1557 gift roll records a "free gift" of a gilt salt given to "Betterys, laundrys".

Beatrice died in December 1561, after making a will on 25 May, and was buried at Boreham in Essex. The parish register recorded her burial in January, "Betteris Apryse landeris to Queen Marie".

== Family ==
Her husband was David ap Rice, a yeoman or groom of Mary's chamber. He had been appointed a groom of the chamber to Mary Tudor, Princess of Castille in 1508. David ap Rice died before November 1557. Their children included Harry, Susan, Winifred, and probably Mary. The accounts of Lady Mary include gifts to the children.

It is not known if she was a relation to Mrs Barbara Ryce, Mary's chamberer, and her husband William Ryce (died 1588), who was also a royal servant. A Robert ap Ryce alias Pryce was an officer of the ewery. "Mr Rice" lent money to William Petre to play a dice game with Queen Mary at Hampton Court in September 1553. John Foxe, who wrote a description of Mary's final days, claimed to have received his information from a Mr Rice.
