= Mary Fiennes, Baroness Dacre =

English noblewoman

Mary Neville
- Baroness Dacre
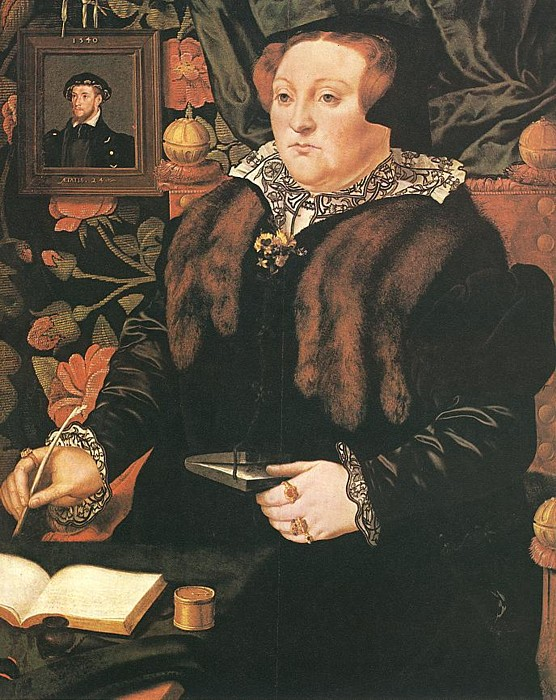
- Mary Neville by Hans Eworth, 1555-1558, with an inset portrait of her first husband Thomas Fiennes dated a year before his death.
- Born: 1524
- Died: 1576 (aged 51–52)
- Noble family: Neville (by birth); Fiennes (by marriage)
- Spouses: Thomas Fiennes, 9th Baron Dacre; John Wotton; Francis Thursby
- Issue: Thomas Fiennes; Gregory Fiennes, 10th Baron Dacre; Margaret Fiennes, 11th Baroness Dacre
- Father: George Neville, 5th Baron Bergavenny
- Mother: Lady Mary Stafford

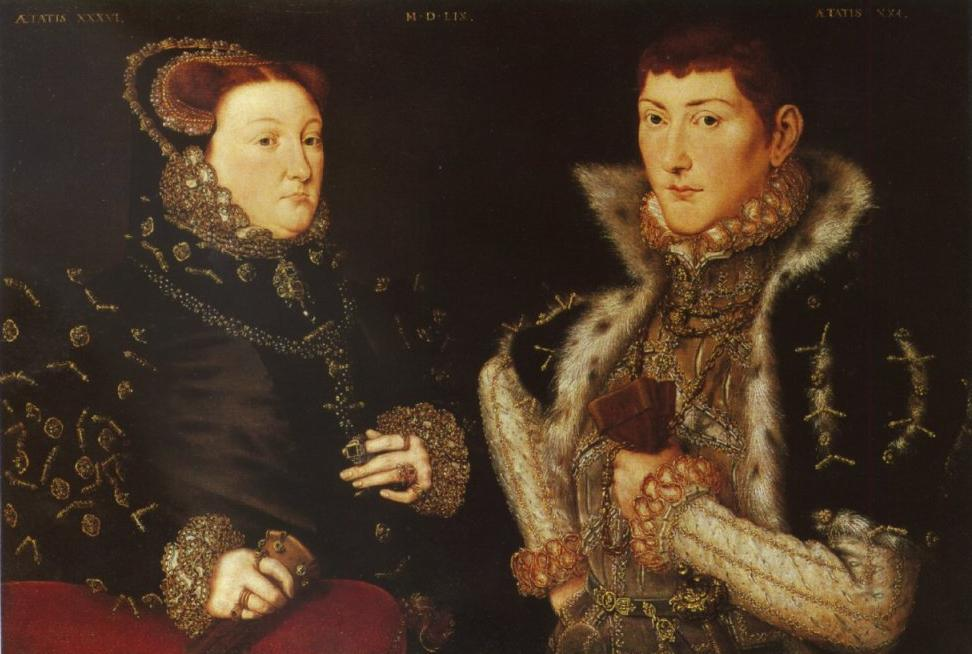
Mary Nevill and her son Gregory Fiennes by Hans Eworth, 1559

Mary Fiennes, Baroness Dacre (1524 – after 1565) was the daughter of George Neville, 5th Baron Bergavenny by his third wife, Lady Mary Stafford, youngest daughter of Edward Stafford, 3rd Duke of Buckingham.

== Life ==
In 1536 she married Thomas Fiennes, 9th Baron Dacre (c. 1515–1541). Both Lord and Lady Dacre were among the party appointed to meet Anne of Cleves and welcome her to England. In 1558, Mary Neville Fiennes, Lady Dacre, assisted at the funeral of Mary I.

By her first husband, Lady Dacre was the mother of:

- Thomas Fiennes (1538–1553)
- Gregory Fiennes, 10th Baron Dacre (1539–1594)
- Margaret Fiennes, 11th Baroness Dacre (1540–1611)

Lord Dacre was convicted of the murder of a gamekeeper and hanged as a common criminal at Tyburn in 1541. The family was stripped of its lands and titles by Henry VIII.

In the following years, Mary battled to have the properties restored on behalf of her children, and on her ascension in 1558 Elizabeth restored the title of Baron Dacre to Mary's second son Gregory, her eldest son Thomas having died at age 15 on 25 August 1553.

Lady Dacre married twice after her first husband's death and had several other children about whom little is known. Her second marriage was to John Wooton or Wotton of St. Clere's manor in North Tuddenham, Norfolk, (a relative of the Le Strange family of Hunstanton), whom she wed some time before 18 May 1546. After his death, she married Francis Thursby of Congham in Norfolk. He was the son of Thomas Thursby (d.1543) of Ashwicken, and the grandson of Thomas Thursby (d.1510), thrice Mayor of King's Lynn, and is reported to have had six additional children.

Lady Dacre took part in the funeral procession of Mary I on 14 December 1558.

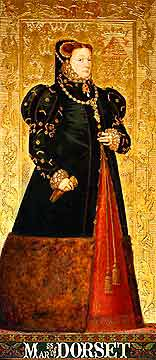
Mary Neville Fiennes, Lady Dacre as the Marchioness of Dorset in the Houses of Parliament

A petition made by her son Gregory, Lord Dacre, to Queen Elizabeth I in 1559, mentions that Lady Dacre had in 1559 three living sons and three daughters by her third husband, Francis Thursby of Congham. The author references an MS. petition by her son Gregory, Lord Dacre to Queen Elizabeth I in 1559.

Mary's death date is unclear, with sources giving the earliest possible date as 18 December 1565 and the latest as sometime in 1576.

== Ancestry ==
Ancestors of Mary Fiennes, Baroness Dacre

16. Ralph de Neville, 1st Earl of Westmorland
8. Edward Neville, 3rd Baron Bergavenny
17. Lady Joan Beaufort
4. George Neville, 4th Baron Bergavenny
18. Richard de Beauchamp, 1st Earl of Worcester
9. Lady Elizabeth de Beauchamp
19. Lady Isabel le Despenser
2. George Neville, 5th Baron Bergavenny
20. Thomas Fenn
10. Hugh Fenn
21.
5. Margaret Fenn
22.
11. Eleanor
23.
1. Mary Neville, Baroness Dacre
24. Humphrey Stafford, Earl of Stafford
12. Henry Stafford, 2nd Duke of Buckingham
25. Margaret Beaufort, Countess of Stafford
6. Edward Stafford, 3rd Duke of Buckingham
26. Richard Woodville, 1st Earl Rivers
13. Lady Katherine Woodville
27. Jacquetta of Luxembourg
3. Lady Mary Stafford
28. Henry Percy, 3rd Earl of Northumberland
14. Henry Percy, 4th Earl of Northumberland
29. Eleanor Poynings
7. Lady Alianore Percy
30. William Herbert, 1st Earl of Pembroke
15. Lady Maud Herbert
31. Anne Devereux
