= Henry Lennard, 12th Baron Dacre =

English baron and politician

Arms of Lennard: Or, on a fess gules three fleurs-de-lys of the field

Henry Lennard (1570 – 8 August 1616) was an English politician and Baron of Dacre.

== Life ==
Lennard was the son of Margaret Fiennes, who was Baroness Dacre, and Sampson Lennard and was baptised on 25 March 1570 at Chevening, Kent.

Lennard took part in the Capture of Cádiz in 1596 and was knighted by in June 1596 Robert Devereux, the Earl of Essex, after the capture of the city.

Lennard was a Member of Parliament (MP) for West Looe in 1597–1598. He successfully claimed the barony of Dacre on his mother's death in 1612.

Lennard married, in 1589, Chrysogona Baker, daughter of Richard Baker of Sissinghurst. They had seven children: Richard, Fynes, Edward, Margaret, Philadelphia, Pembroke, and Barbara. Margaret married Annesley Wildgoose, Philadelphia married Thomas Parker, Pembroke married William, Lord Cobham, and Barbara married Philip Stapleton.

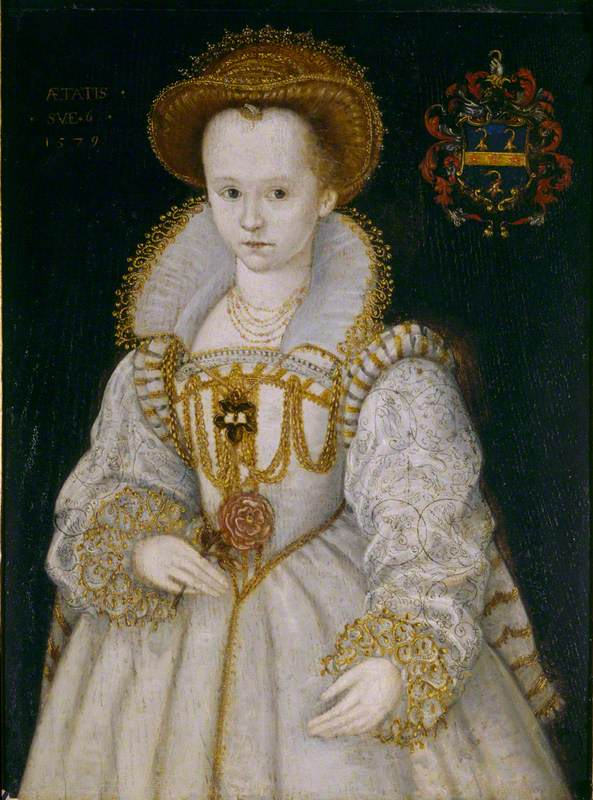
Chrysogona Baker, Lady Dacre (1572/3–1616) as a child, aged 6.

Lennard lived extravagantly and was forced to sell some of his lands. He died of a fever on 8 August 1616, and was buried at Chevening the next day. His widow was buried 30 September 1616. He was succeeded as baron by his son Richard.
