= Thomas Fiennes, 9th Baron Dacre =

English nobleman and murderer

The Right Horourable The Lord Dacre
- Baron Dacre
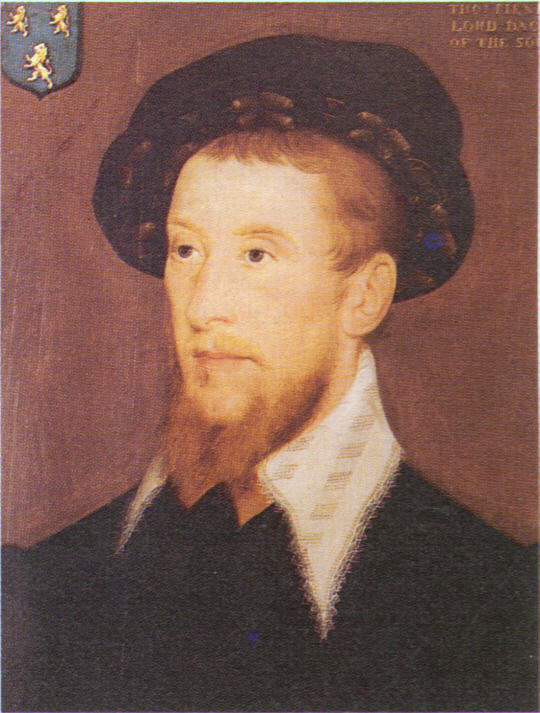
- Thomas Fiennes, Baron Dacre

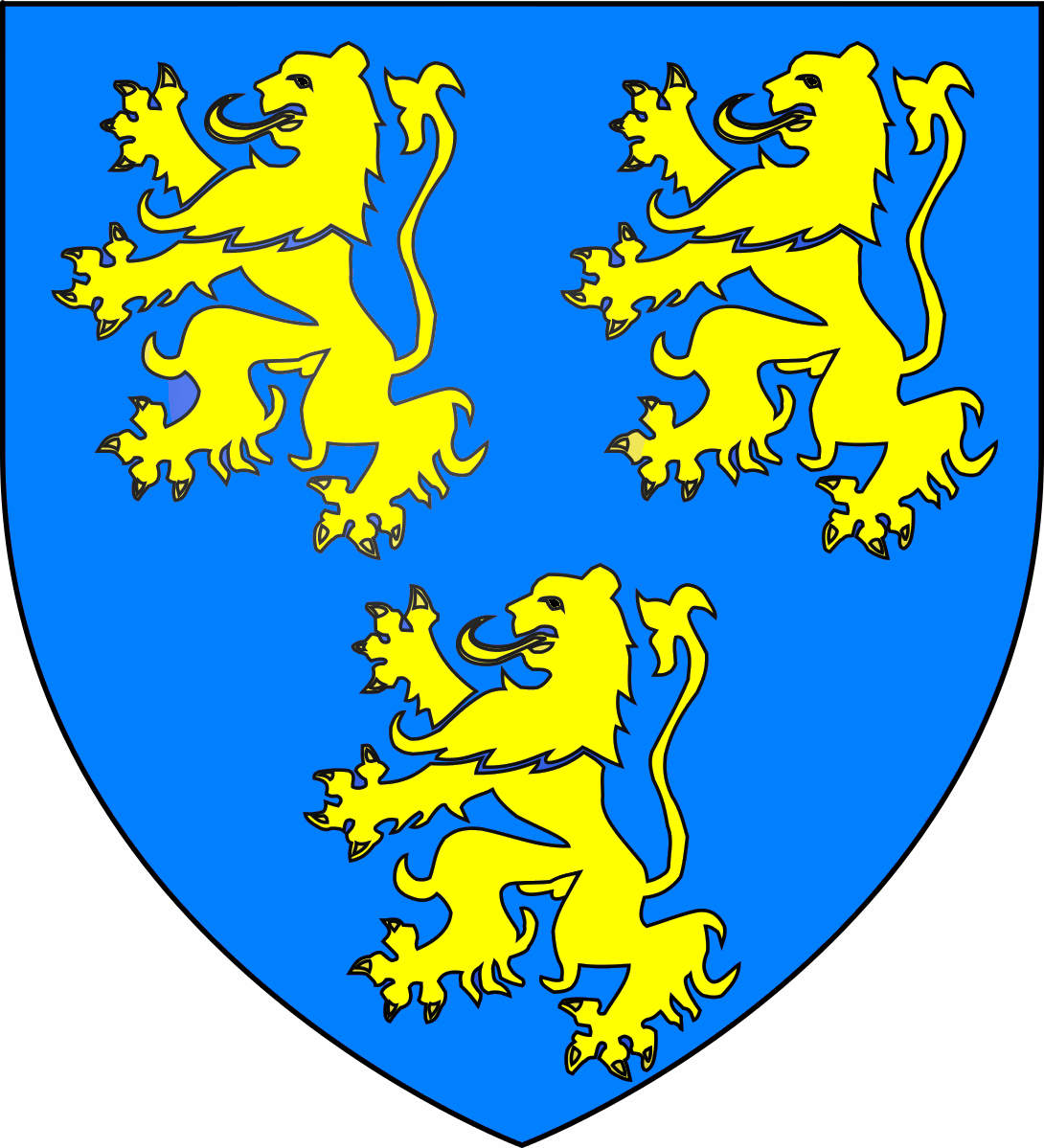
- Coat of arms
- Reign: Henry VIII
- Predecessor: Thomas Fiennes, 8th Baron Dacre (grandfather)
- Successor: Gregory Fiennes, 10th Baron Dacre
- Born: Thomas Fiennes c. 1516
- Died: 29 June 1541 (aged 24–25); Tyburn
- Buried: St Sepulchre-without-Newgate
- Noble family: Fiennes
- Spouse: Mary Fiennes
- Issue: Thomas Fiennes; Gregory Fiennes, 10th Baron Dacre; Margaret Fiennes, 11th Baroness Dacre
- Father: Sir Thomas Fiennes
- Mother: Jane Sutton

Thomas Fiennes, 9th Baron Dacre (c. 1516 – 1541) was an English nobleman notable for his conviction and execution for murder. He was the son of Sir Thomas Fiennes (d. 1528) and Jane, daughter of Edward Sutton, 2nd Baron Dudley.

== Early life ==
He was born in or before 1516, the son and heir of Sir Thomas Fiennes and Jane (d. 1539), daughter of Edward Sutton, 2nd Baron Dudley. When his father died in 1528 he became heir apparent to his grandfather's title and the family seat at Herstmonceux Castle in Sussex, and he succeeded to the title at the age of approximately 19 in 1533.

== Marriage ==
In 1536 he married Mary, daughter of George Neville, 5th Baron Bergavenny and his third wife, Mary, daughter of Edward Stafford, 3rd Duke of Buckingham, by whom he had three children:

- Thomas Fiennes, who died at the age of fifteen in 1553
- Gregory Fiennes, 10th Baron Dacre, who may have been named after Thomas Cromwell's son, Gregory.
- Margaret Fiennes, 11th Baroness Dacre

== Career ==
He was a member of the jury at the trial of Anne Boleyn in 1536, and of Thomas, Lord Darcy, and John, Lord Hussey in May 1537 (for their part in the Pilgrimage of Grace), and of Baron Montagu and the Marquess of Exeter in 1538 for the Exeter Conspiracy.

In October 1537, he attended the baptism of Prince Edward and bore the canopy at Queen Jane's funeral the following month. He was also among those lords who greeted Anne of Cleves at Rainham Down on New Year's Eve in 1539.

== Downfall and death ==
On 30 April 1541 Dacre led a party of gentlemen including his brother-in-law John Mantell, John Frowds, George Roidon, Thomas Isleie, and two yeomen Richard Middleton and John Goldwell, to poach on the lands of Sir Nicholas Pelham of Laughton. During the escapade, they encountered John Busbrig (or Busbridge), James Busbrig, and Richard Summer who were servants of Pelham. The encounter turned into an affray during which John Busbrig was fatally wounded. Dacre and several others were charged with murder and arraigned before the Lord High Steward, Lord Audley of Walden on 27 June. Dacre originally entered a plea of not guilty but was later persuaded to change it to guilty and throw himself upon the King's mercy in the hope of a reprieve. Unlike many of his contemporaries, he was not executed by beheading but was hanged at Tyburn on 29 June 1541. An account of the execution in Hall's Chronicle says:

he was led on foot, between the two sheriffs of London, from the Tower through the city to Tyburn, where he was strangled as common murderers are, and his body buried in the church of St. Sepulchre's.

His only sister Anne's husband, John Mantell, was hanged along with his brother-in-law. Frowds and Roidon were also executed for the crime.

== Gallery ==
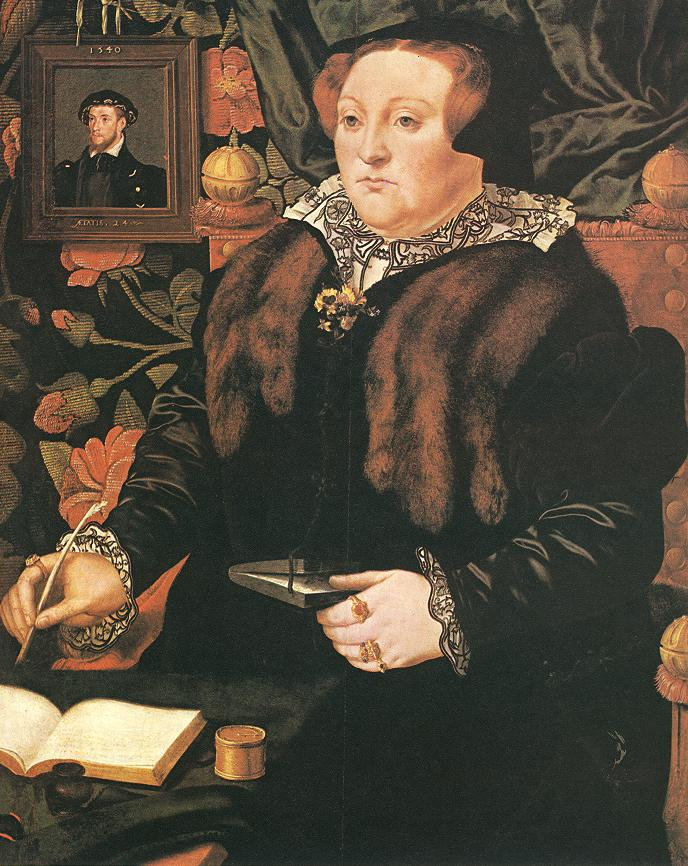
Hans Eworth's portrait of Mary Neville, with a posthumous image of her husband in the background

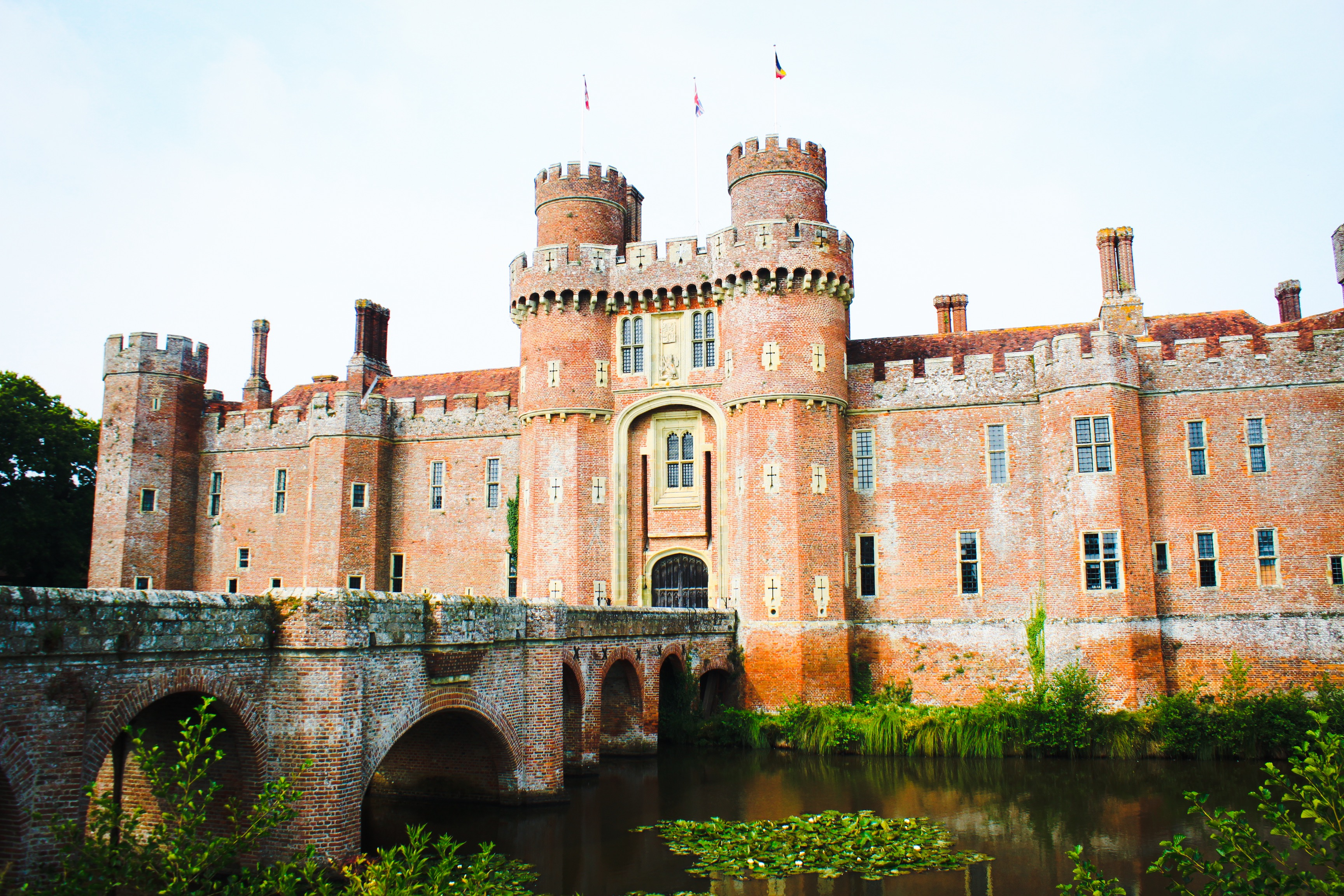
Herstmonceux Castle, Sussex

Dacre's family were stripped of their lands and title, but the title was restored to his second son Gregory in 1558 (the elder son Thomas died before the restitution, aged 15).

== In popular culture ==
Fiennes's case was briefly mentioned in the Showtime ‘‘historical’’ series The Tudors.

== Notes ==
Peerage of England
Preceded by Thomas Fiennes	Baron Dacre; 1533/34–1541	Succeeded by Forfeit (restored in 1558 for Gregory Fiennes)
