= Hans Eworth =

Flemish painter

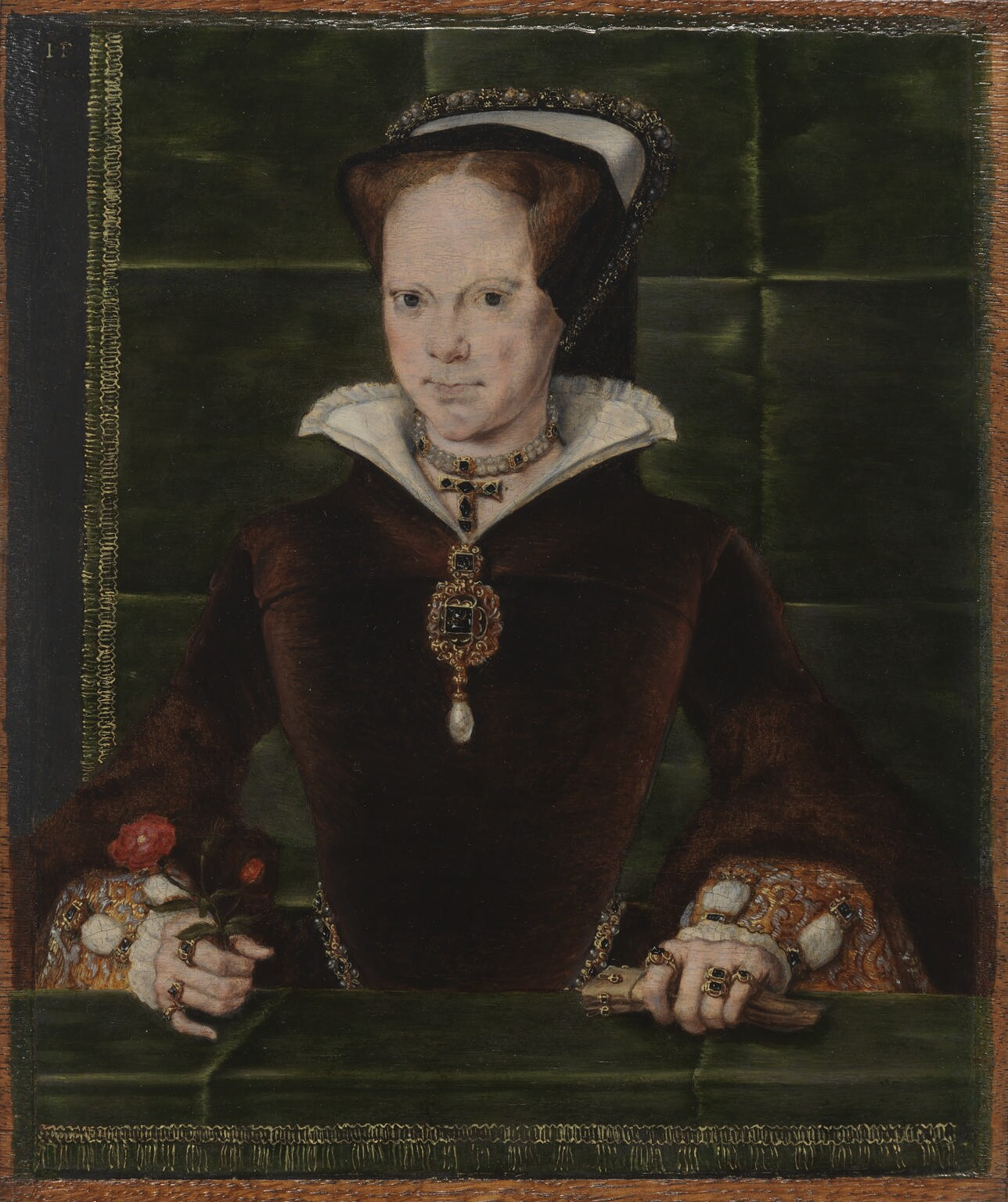
Mary I by Hans Eworth, 1554

Hans Eworth (or Ewouts; c. 1520–1574) was a Flemish painter active in England in the mid-16th century. Along with other exiled Flemings, he made a career in Tudor London, painting allegorical images as well as portraits of the gentry and nobility. About 40 paintings are now attributed to Eworth, among them portraits of Mary I and Elizabeth I. Eworth also executed decorative commissions for Elizabeth's Office of the Revels in the early 1570s.

== Career ==
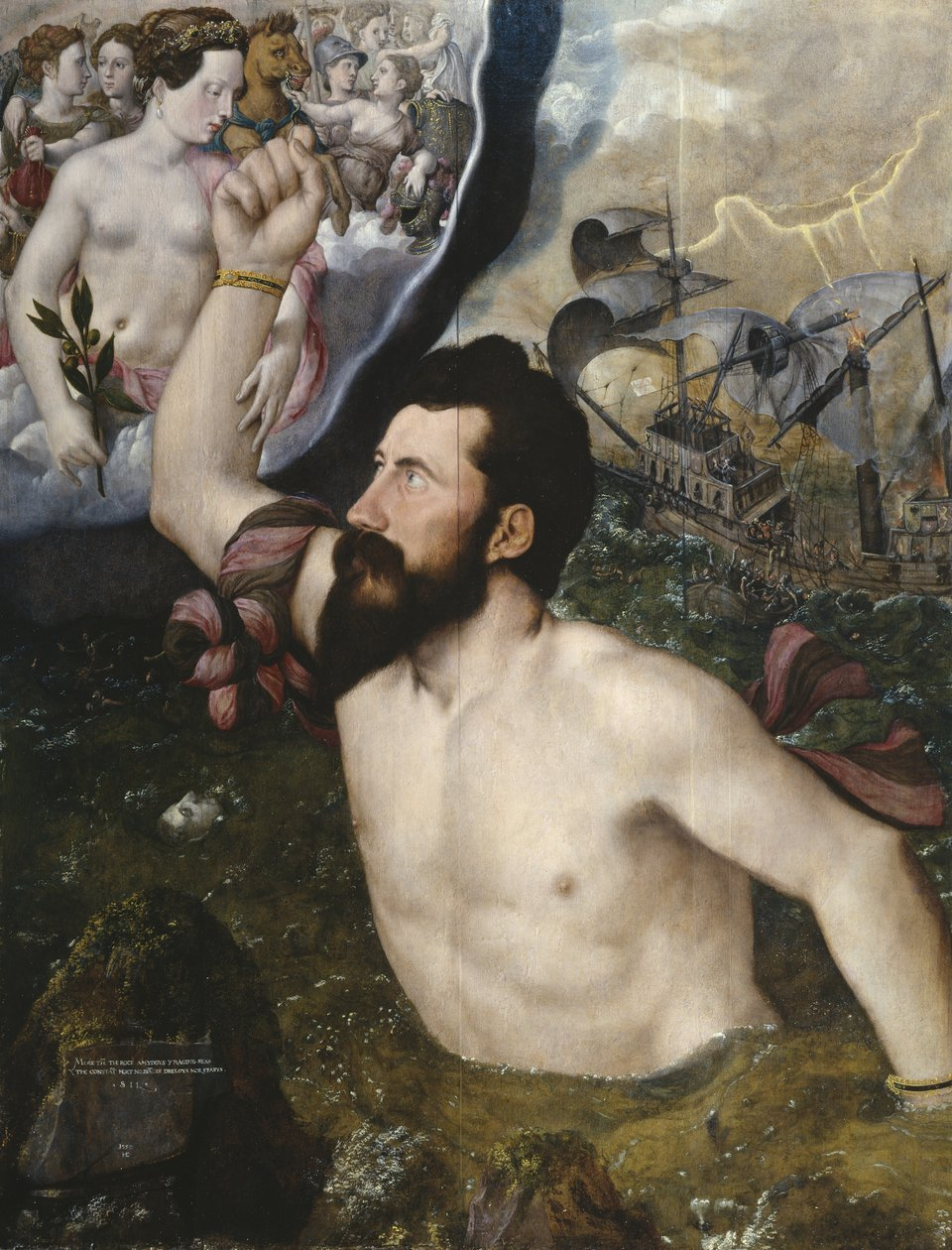
Allegorical portrait of Sir John Luttrell, 1550, oil on panel

Nothing is known of Eworth's early life or training. As ″Jan Euworts″, he is recorded as a freeman of the artists' Guild of St Luke in Antwerp in 1540. A ″Jan and Nicholas Ewouts, painter and mercer″ were expelled from Antwerp for heresy in 1544 and scholars generally accept that this Jan is the same individual. By 1545 Eworth was resident in London, where he is well recorded (under a wide variety of spellings) from 1549.

Eworth's earliest surviving works also date from 1549 to 1550. These include the allegorical portrait of Sir John Luttrell with the goddess Pax, commemorating Luttrell's military exploits and the Treaty of Boulogne (24 March 1550) which finally brought peace between England, Scotland, and France after the long wars known as the Rough Wooing. The original – signed with the "HE" monogram Eworth consistently used — was donated to the Courtauld Institute of Art by Arthur Lee, 1st Viscount Lee of Fareham in 1932. The painting was in "badly damaged" condition when it was donated to the institute, although it has subsequently been conserved and restored.

Although there is no direct evidence that Eworth's most important patron was the Catholic queen Mary I, most scholars now accept this to be the case. All his known portraits of Mary I appear to be variants of a portrait in the National Portrait Gallery, London (above) which is signed 'HE' and dated 1554 at the top left. A second portrait, now in the Society of Antiquaries collection, is also signed and dated 1554. Two other portraits show Mary I in later fashions and are thought to have been painted between 1555 and Mary's death in 1558. Another is in the collection of Trinity College, Cambridge. However, after Mary I's death and the change of the political and religious atmosphere with the accession of Elizabeth I, Eworth in 1560 painted the Protestant Martyr Anne Askew, burned at the stake on charges of heresy.

Over the next decade, Eworth continued to paint portraits of the aristocracy, including paired portraits of Thomas Howard, 4th Duke of Norfolk and his second wife and of the Earl and Countess of Moray.

Despite the frequent appearance of a characteristic "HE" monogram, the attribution of works to Eworth—and the identification of his sitters—remains in flux. A well-known painting identified by George Vertue in 1727 as Lady Frances Brandon and her second husband Adrian Stokes has now been correctly identified as Mary Nevill, Baroness Dacre and her son Gregory Fiennes, 10th Baron Dacre. The allegorical painting Elizabeth I and the Three Goddesses (1569), with its slightly different "HE" monogram, has been variously attributed by Sir Roy Strong as cautiously to "The Monogrammist HE" in 1969 and more confidently to Joris Hoefnagel in 1987; it is now accepted as the work of Eworth. Eworth's last known works date from 1570 to 1573.

Like many other artists of the Tudor court, Eworth was also engaged in decorative work; he was involved in the set design for a masque given by Elizabeth I in honor of the French Ambassador in 1572. Payment records show that Eworth was designing for the Office of the Revels as late as 1573, and he is believed to have died in 1574.

== Gallery ==
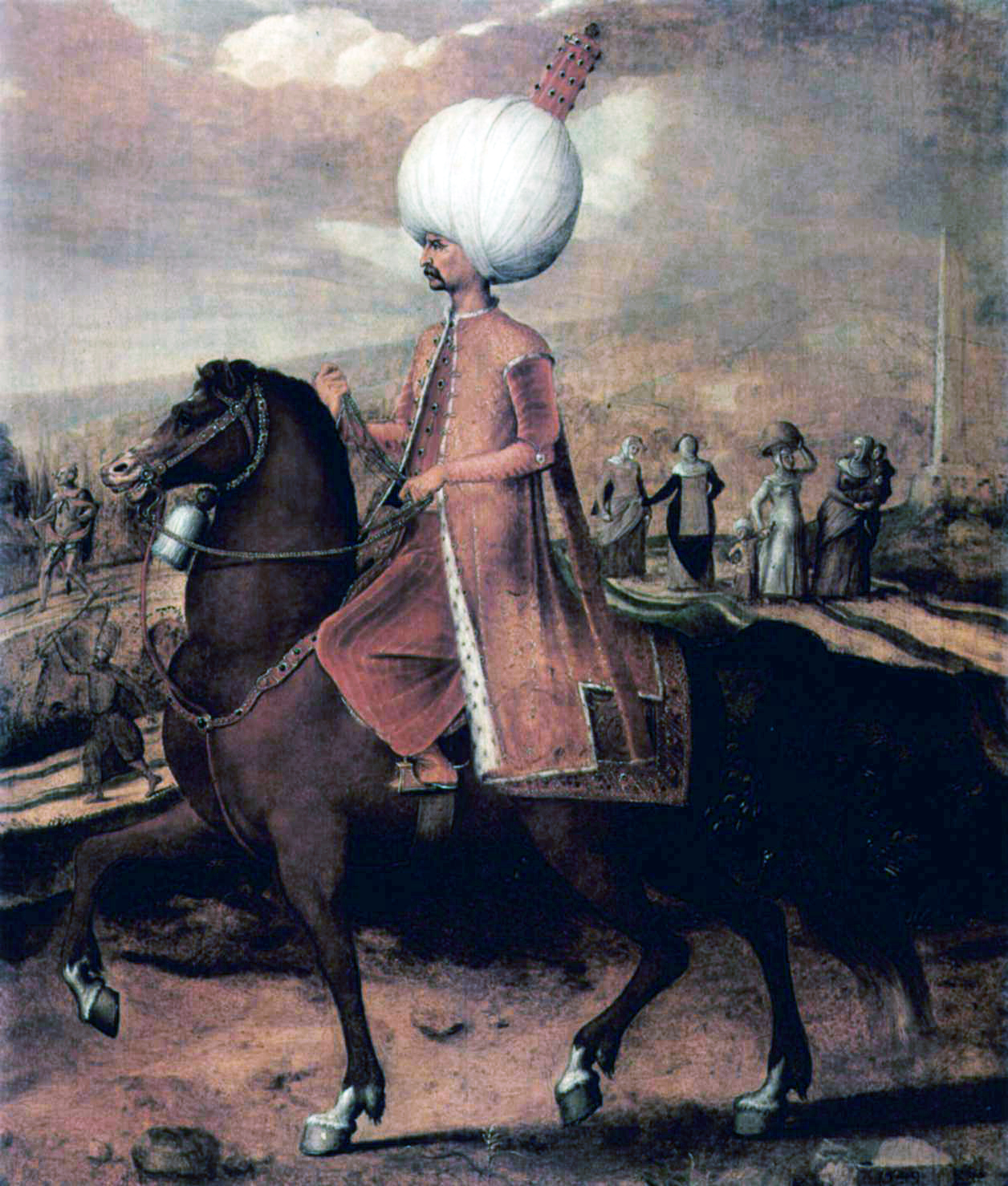
Suleiman the Magnificent on horseback

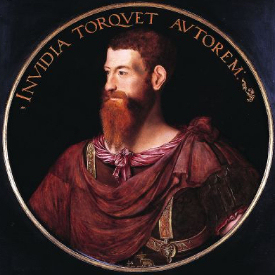
Henry FitzAlan, 19th Earl of Arundel as a Roman Emperor, 1550

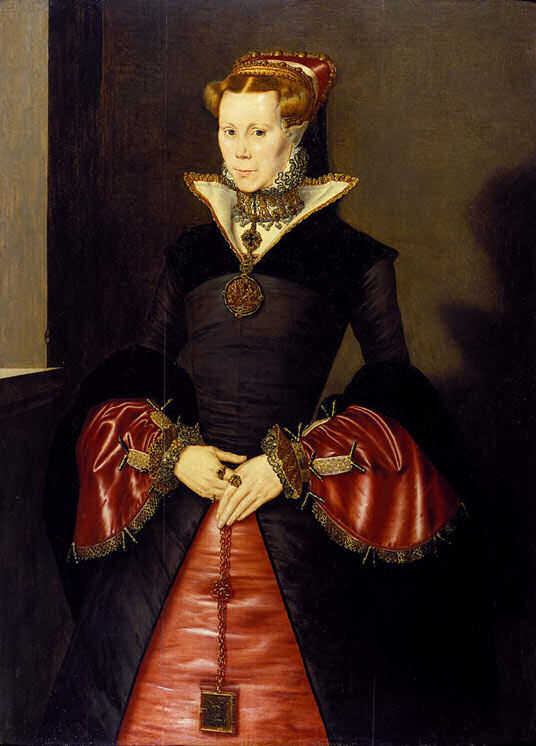
Portrait of an Unknown Lady, formerly called Mary I (possibly Jane Dormer or Lady Jane Grey), c. 1550–55

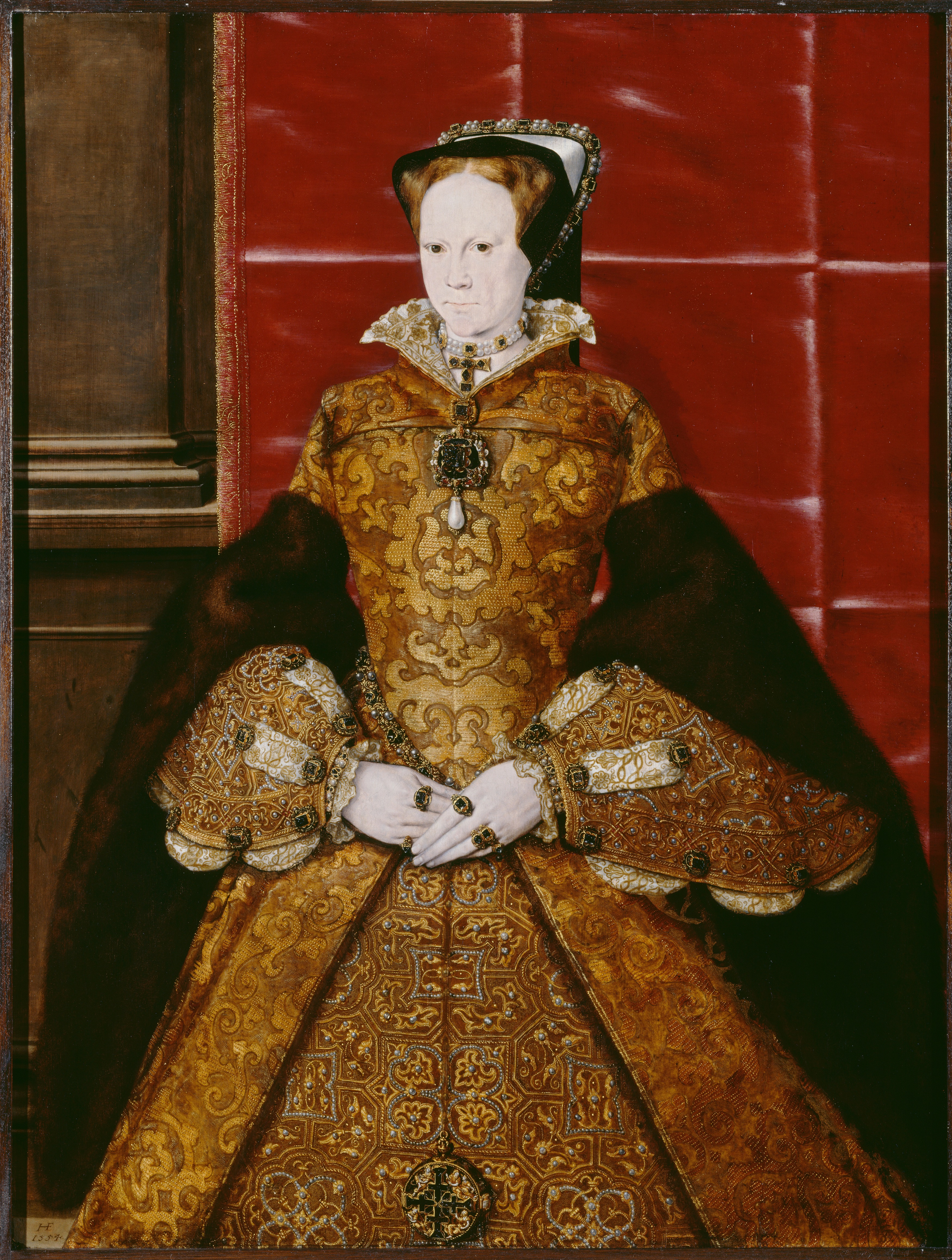
Mary I, 1554, oil on panel

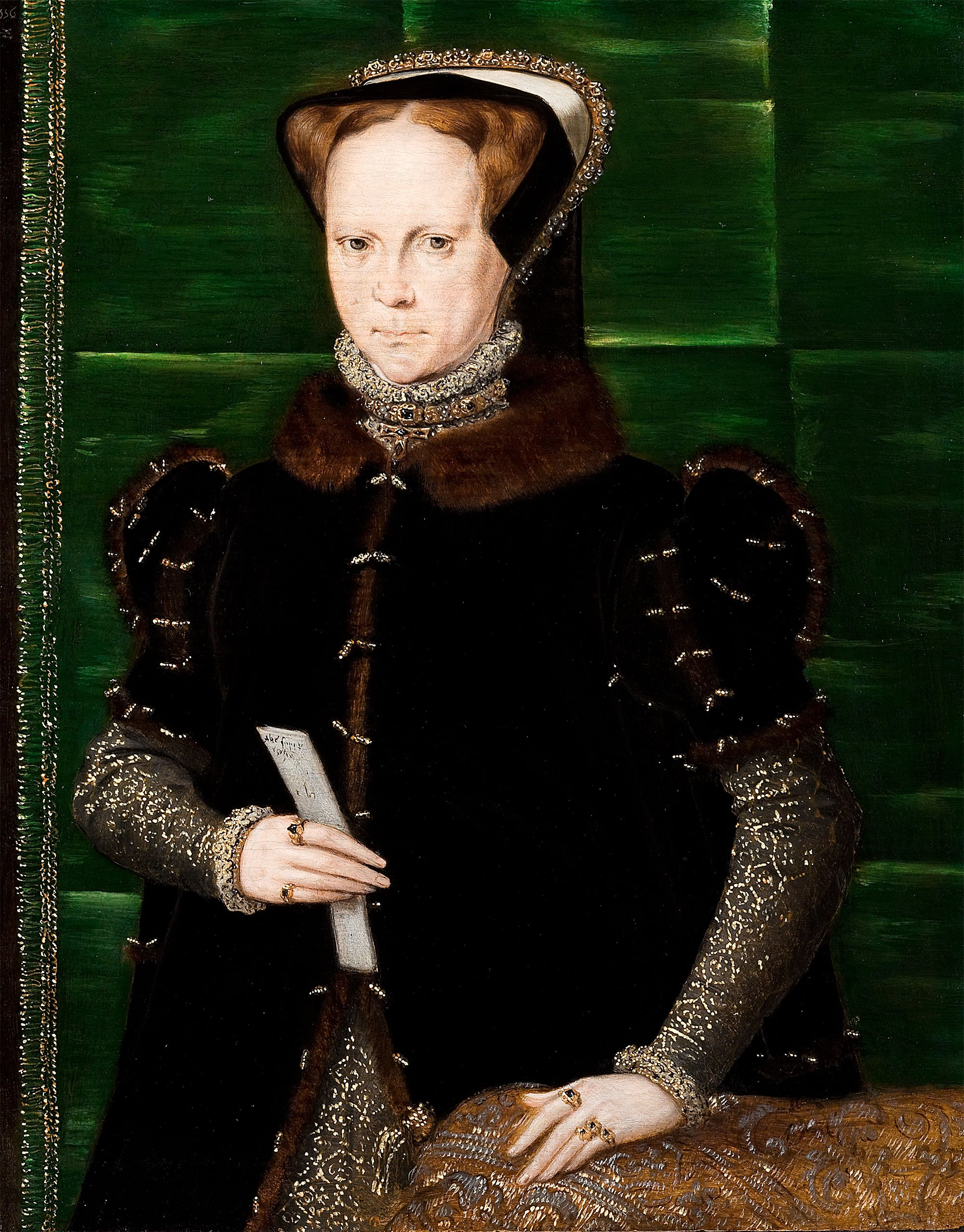
Mary I, c. 1555–58, oil on panel

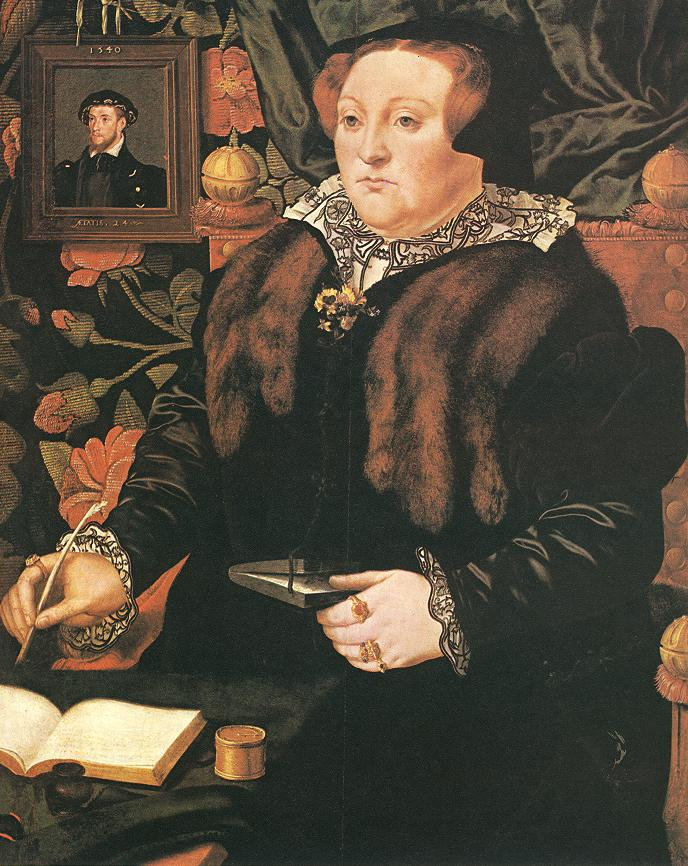
Mary Fiennes, Baroness Dacre, c. 1555–1558, oil on panel

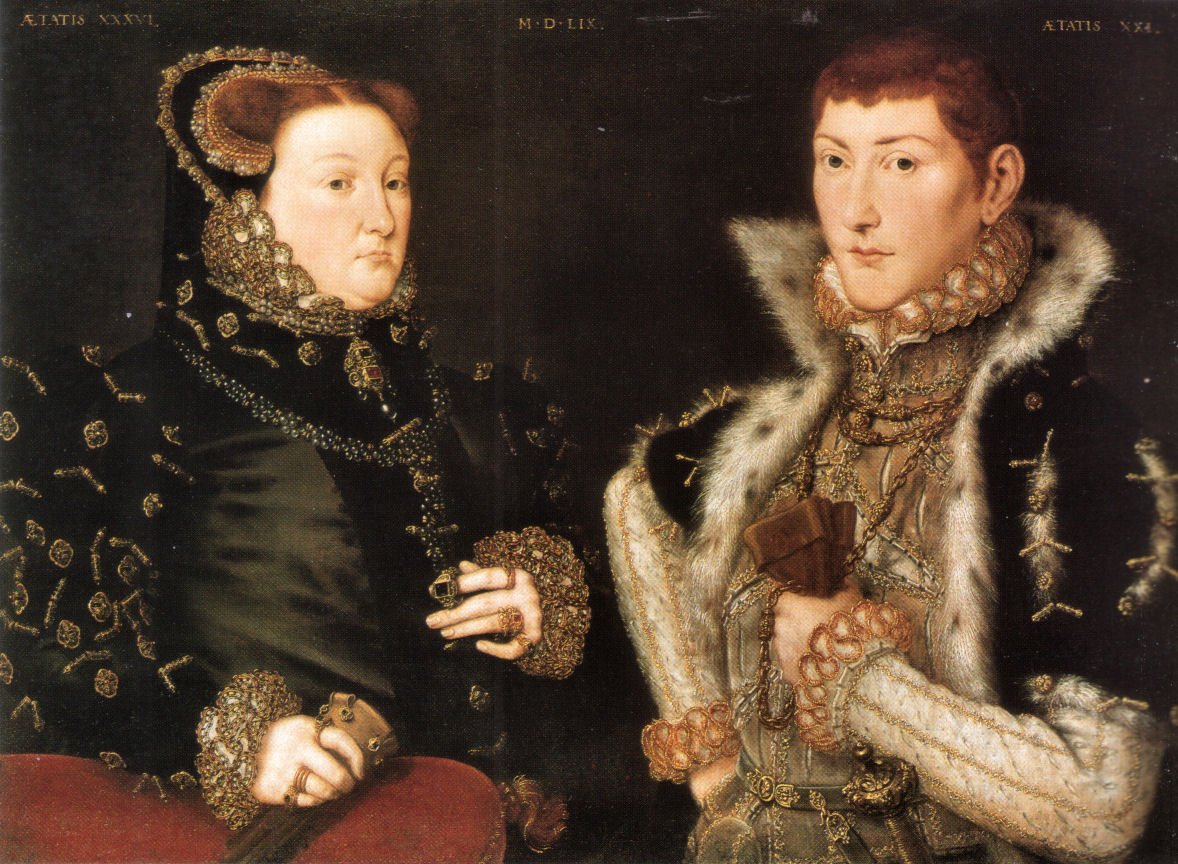
Mary Fiennes and her son Gregory Fiennes, 1559

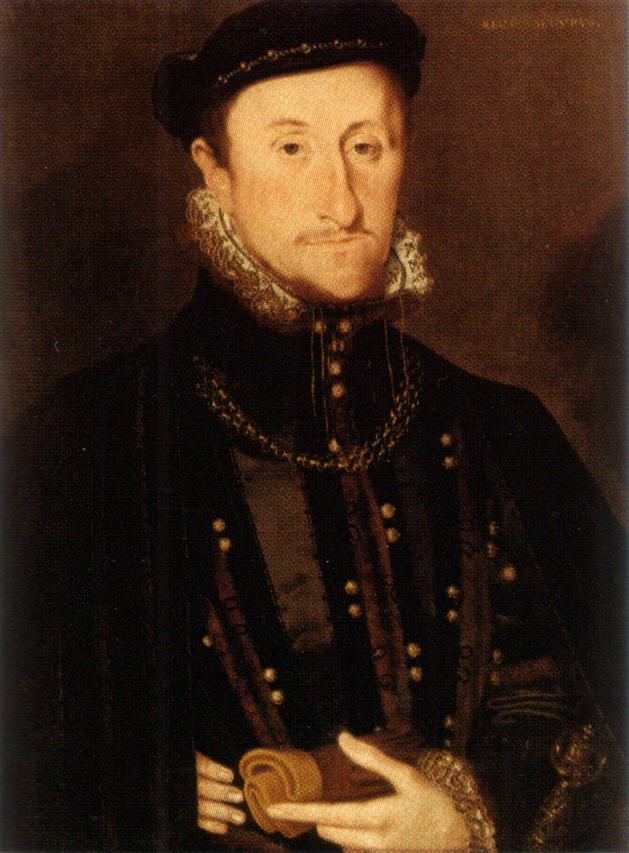
James Stewart, 1st Earl of Moray, 1561

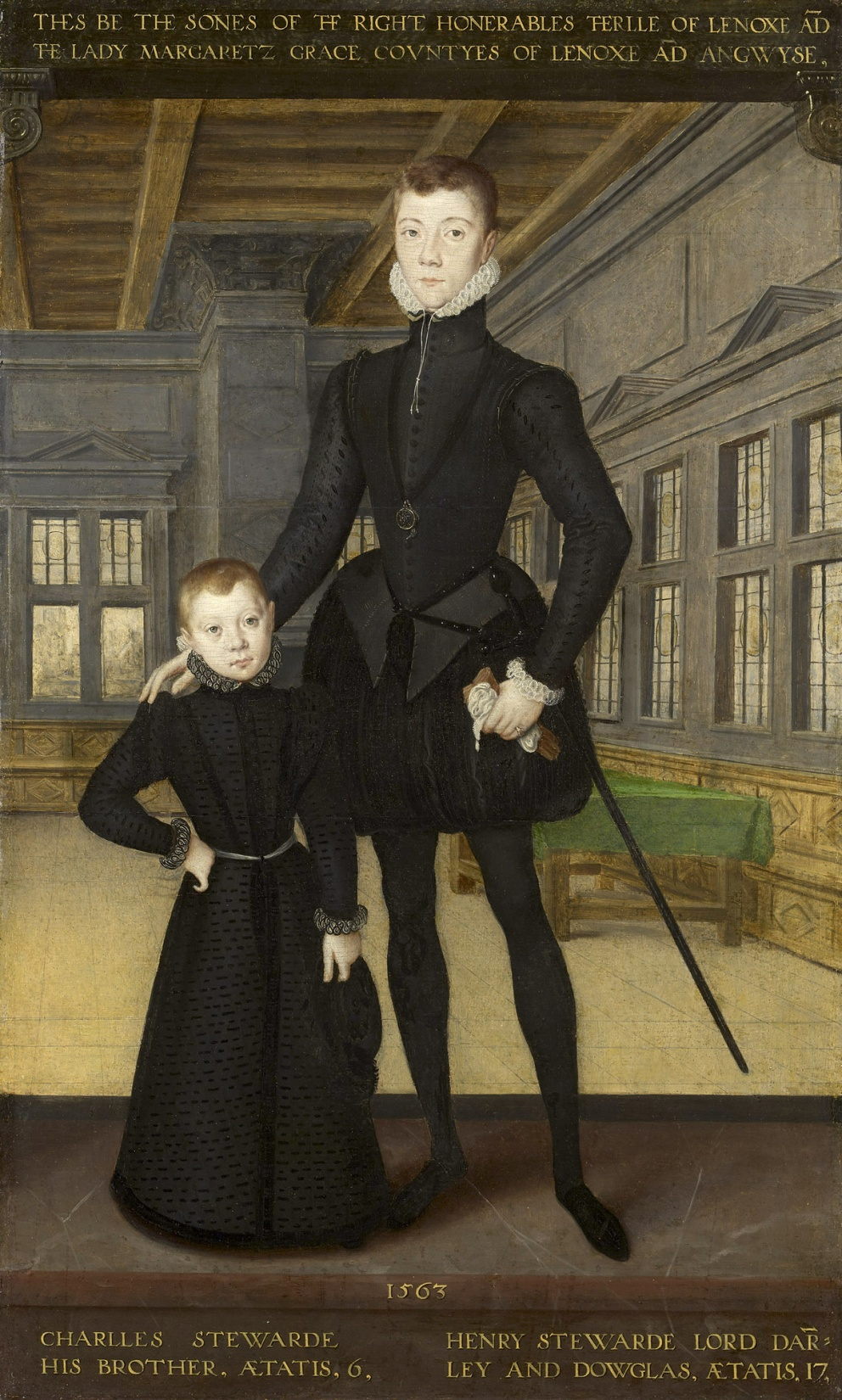
Henry Stuart, Lord Darnley, and Charles Stuart, 1563

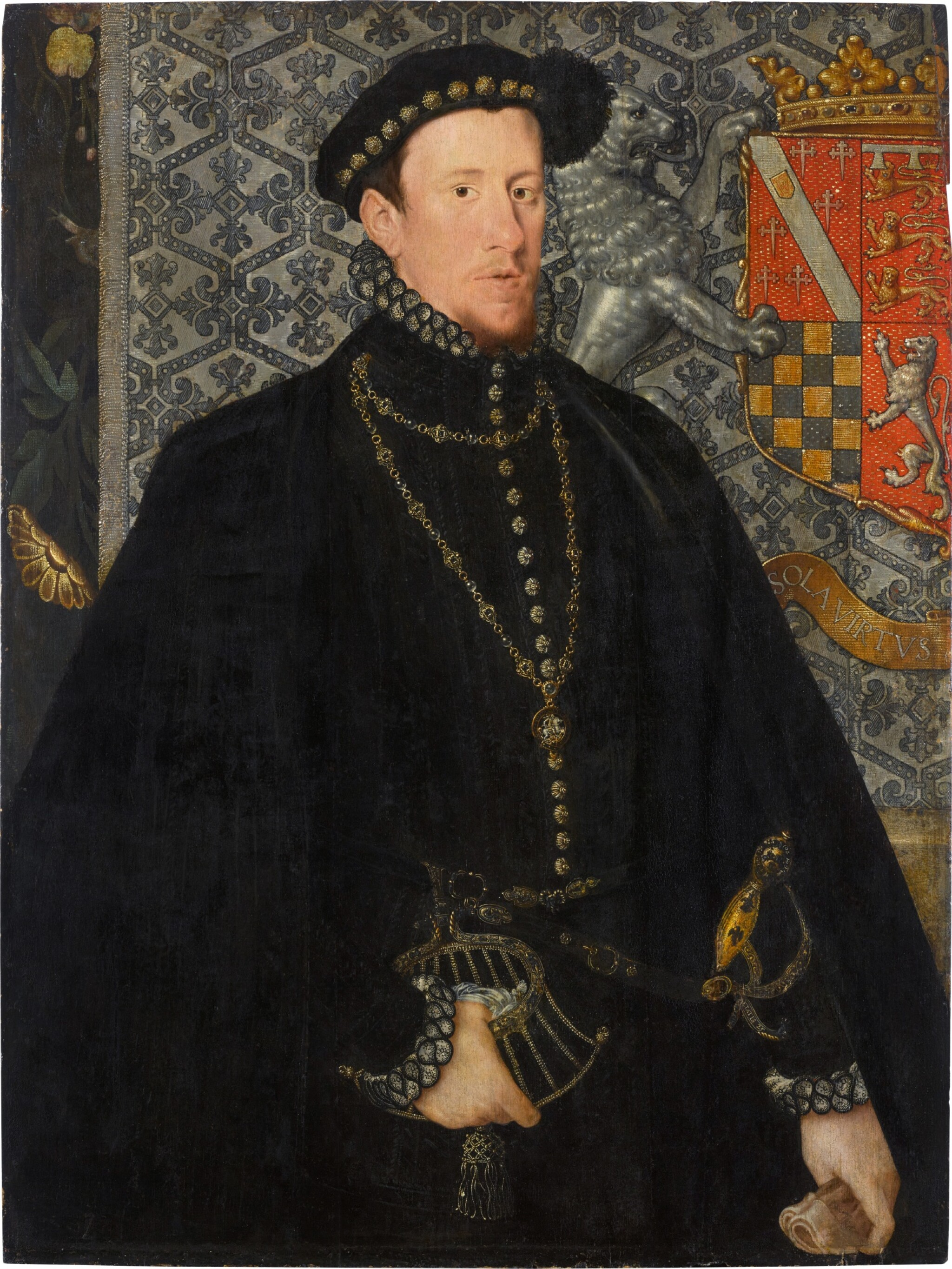
Thomas Howard, 4th Duke of Norfolk, 1563

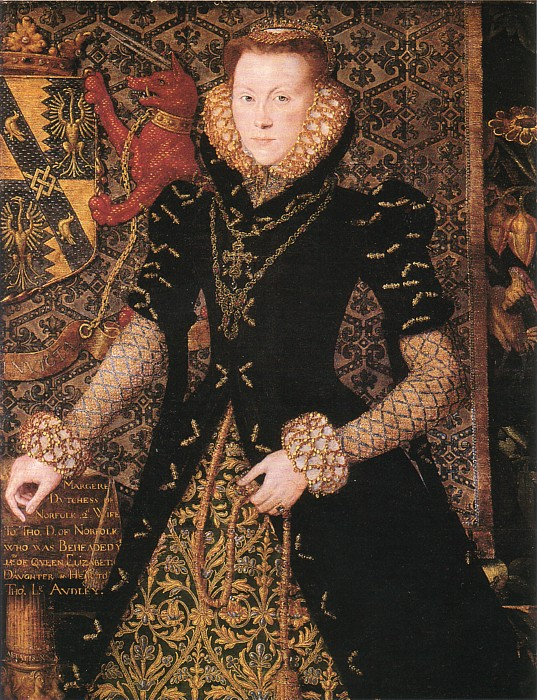
Margaret Audley, Duchess of Norfolk, 1562

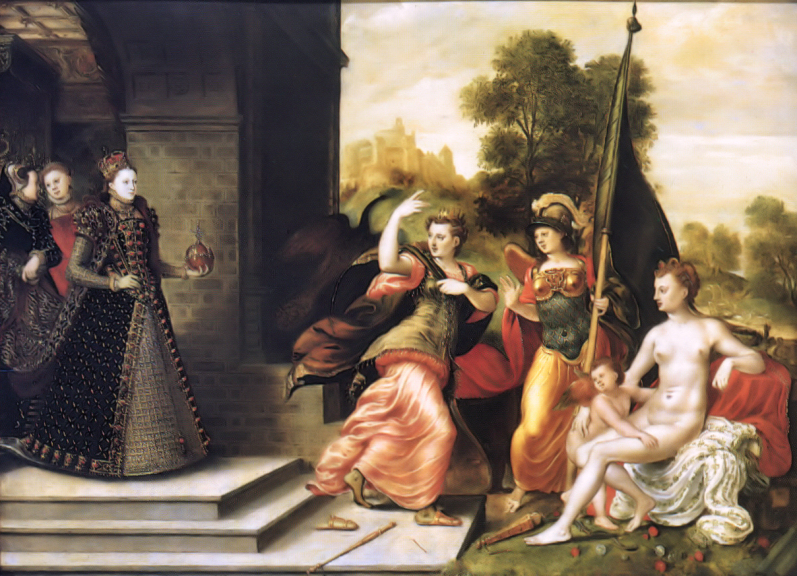
Elizabeth I and the Three Goddesses, 1569

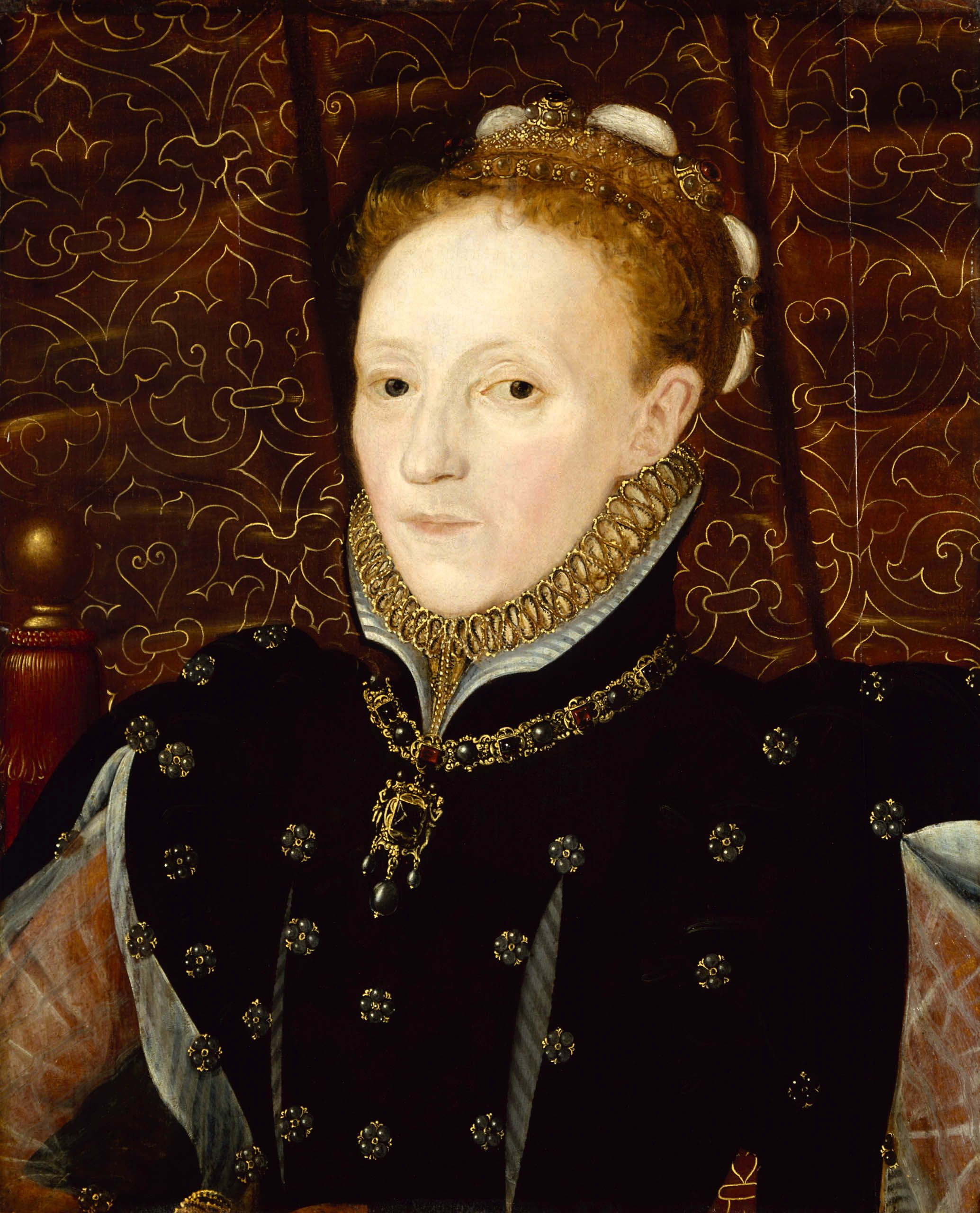
Elizabeth I c. 1570

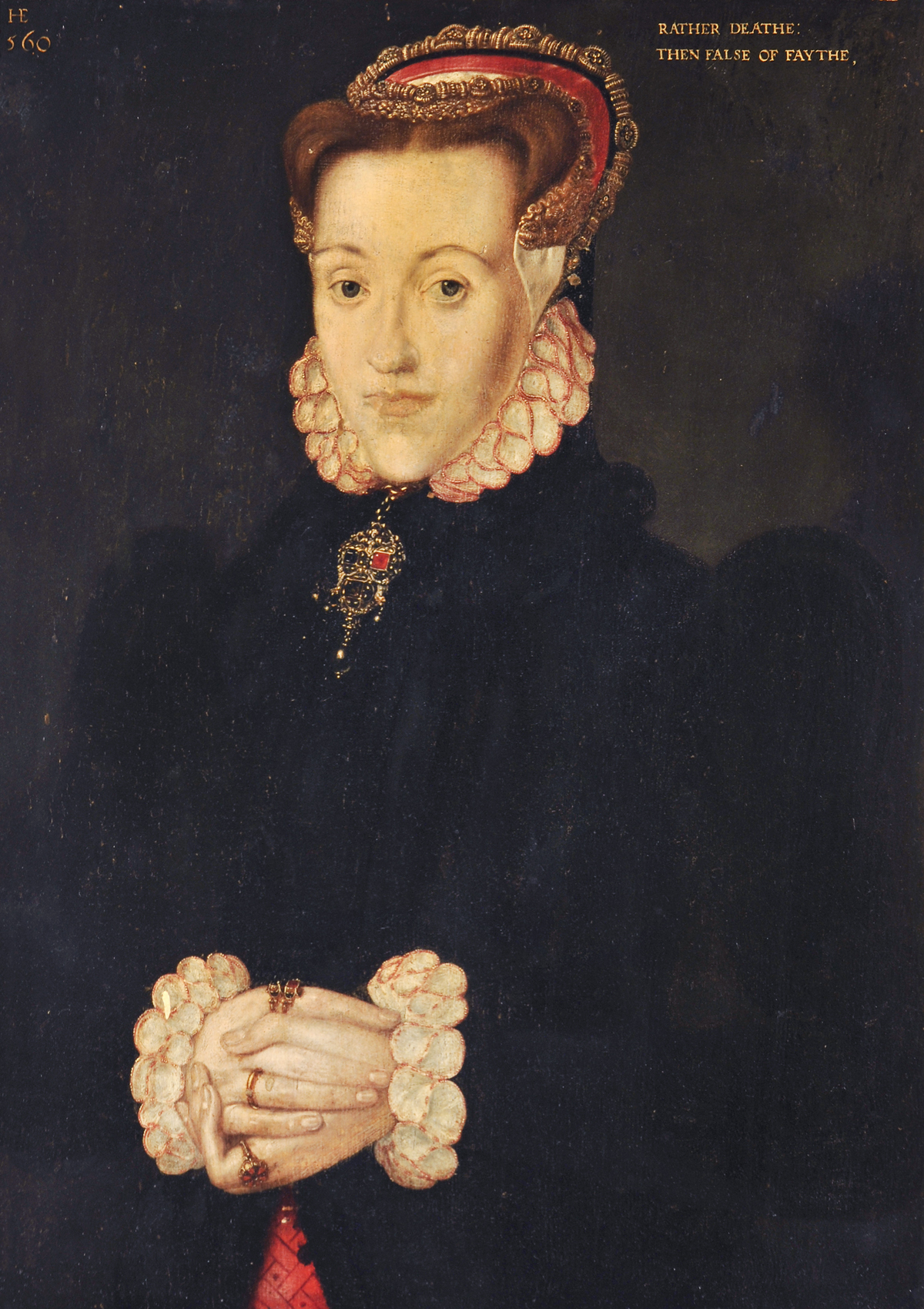
Protestant Martyr Anne Askew, 1560
