= Hood (headgear) =

Type of headgear

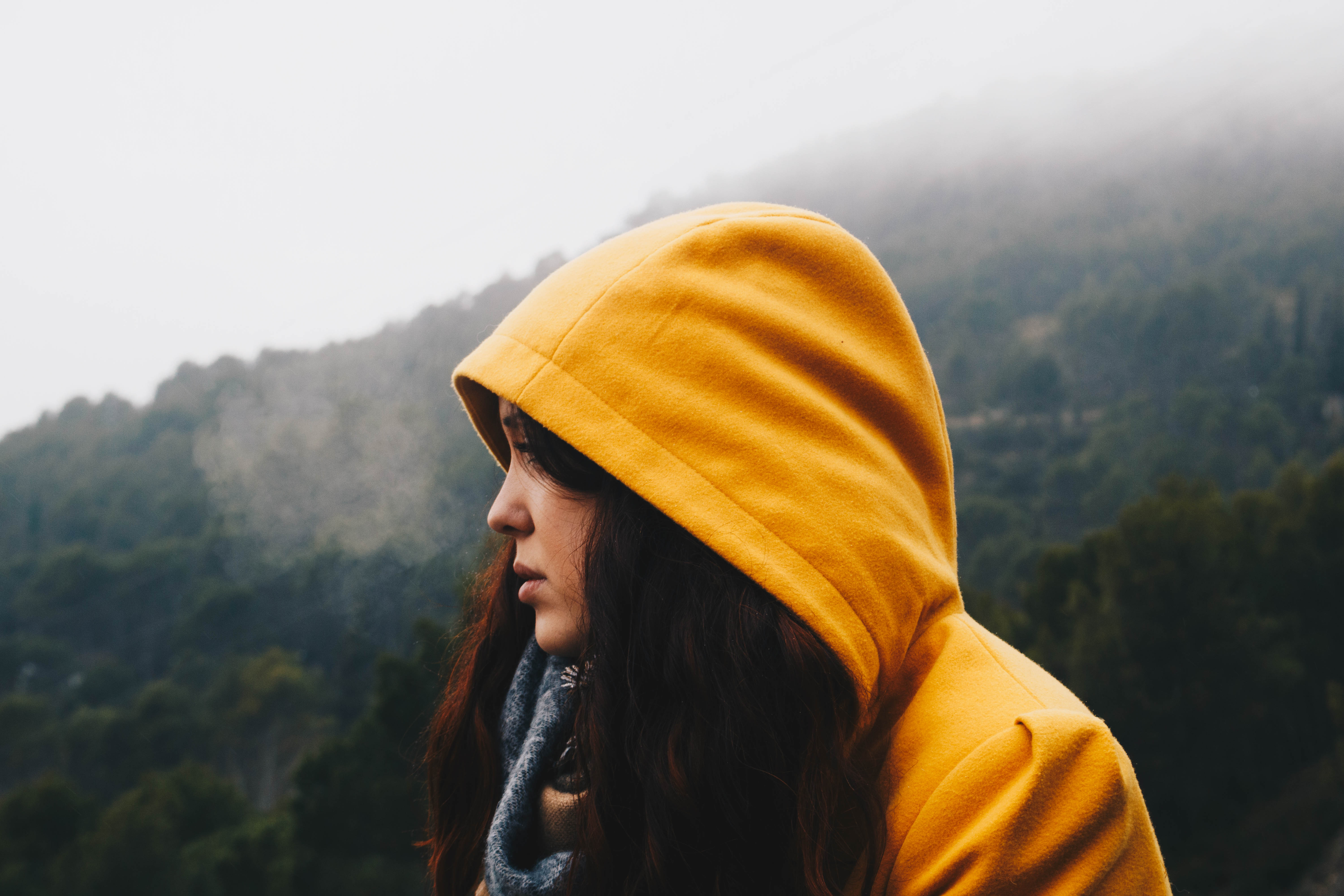
Hood

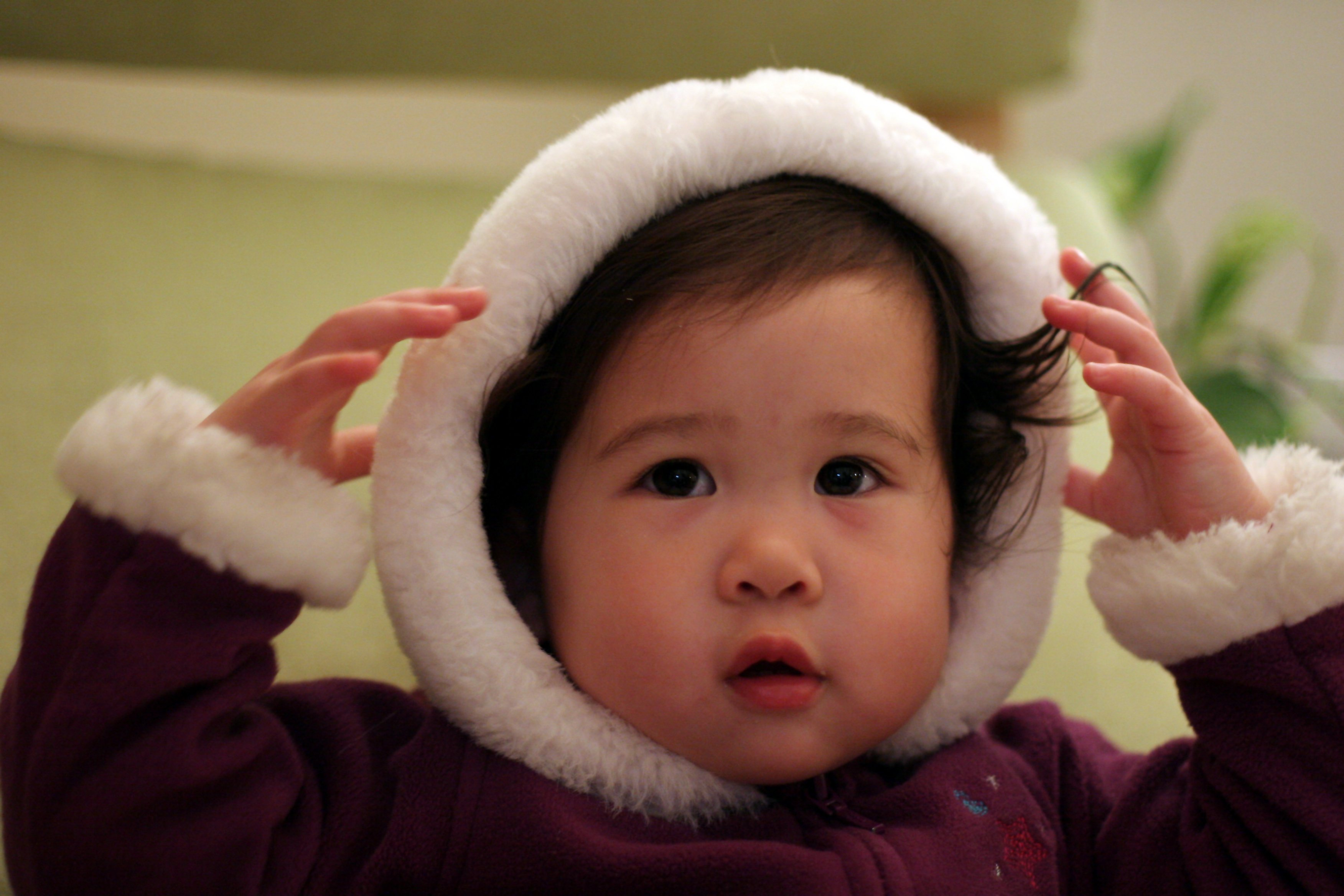
An infant wearing a hood.

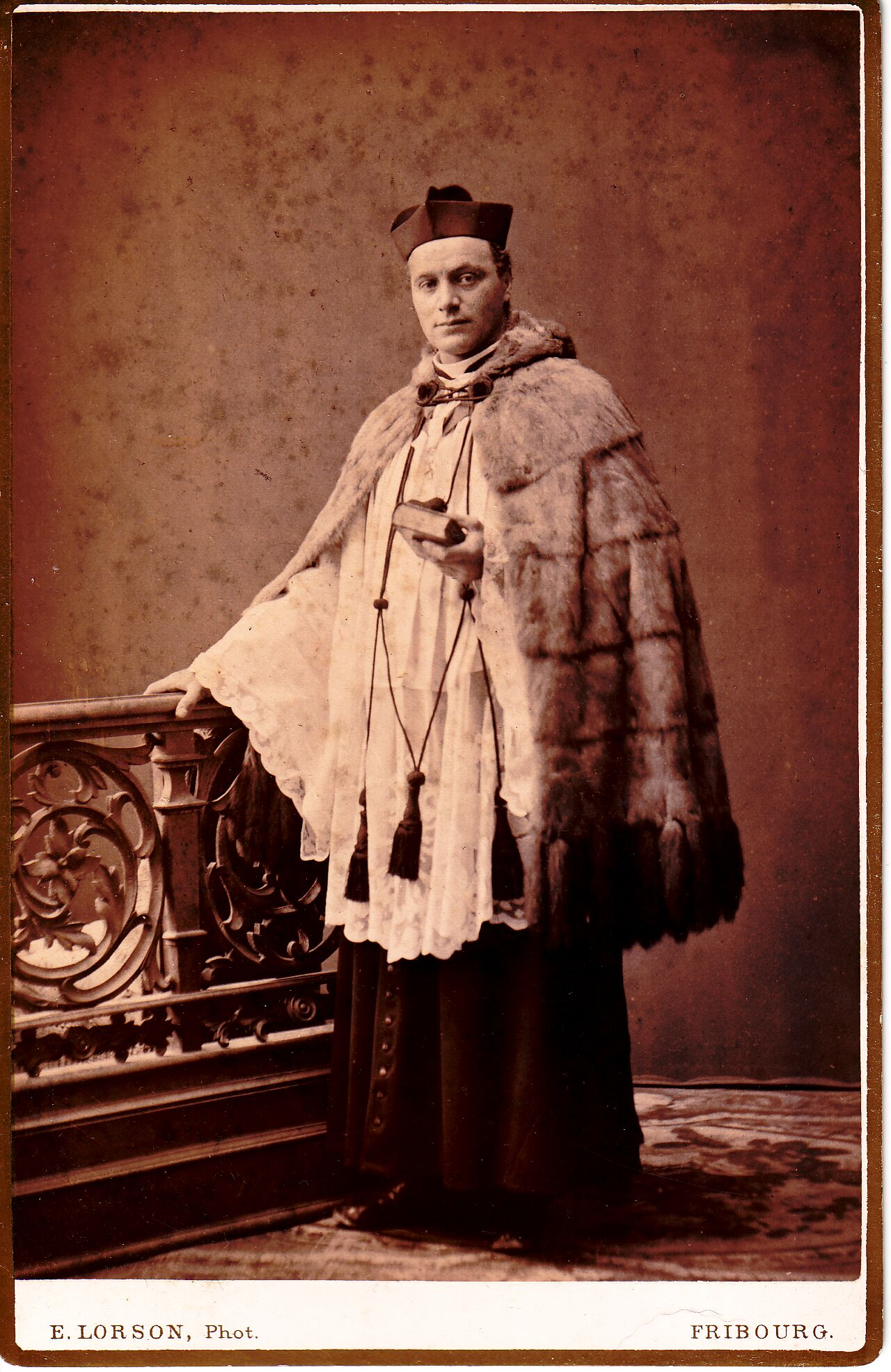
Almuce as part of the clerical clothing.

A hood is a type of headgear or headwear that covers most of the head and neck, and sometimes the face. It may be either a separate item of dress or part of a piece of clothing that may be pulled up to cover the head. Hoods that cover mainly the sides and top of the head, and leave the face mostly or partly open may be worn for protection from the environment (typically cold weather or rain), for fashion, as a form of traditional dress or uniform, or in the case of knights, an armoured hood is used for protection against bladed weapons. In some cases, hoods are used to prevent the wearer from seeing where they are going (e.g., when a prisoner is hooded). Hoods with eye holes may be used for religious purposes to prevent the wearer from being seen. In the case of Ku Klux Klan members, terrorists, or criminals such as robbers, a hood with eye holes helps prevent identification.

== Etymology ==
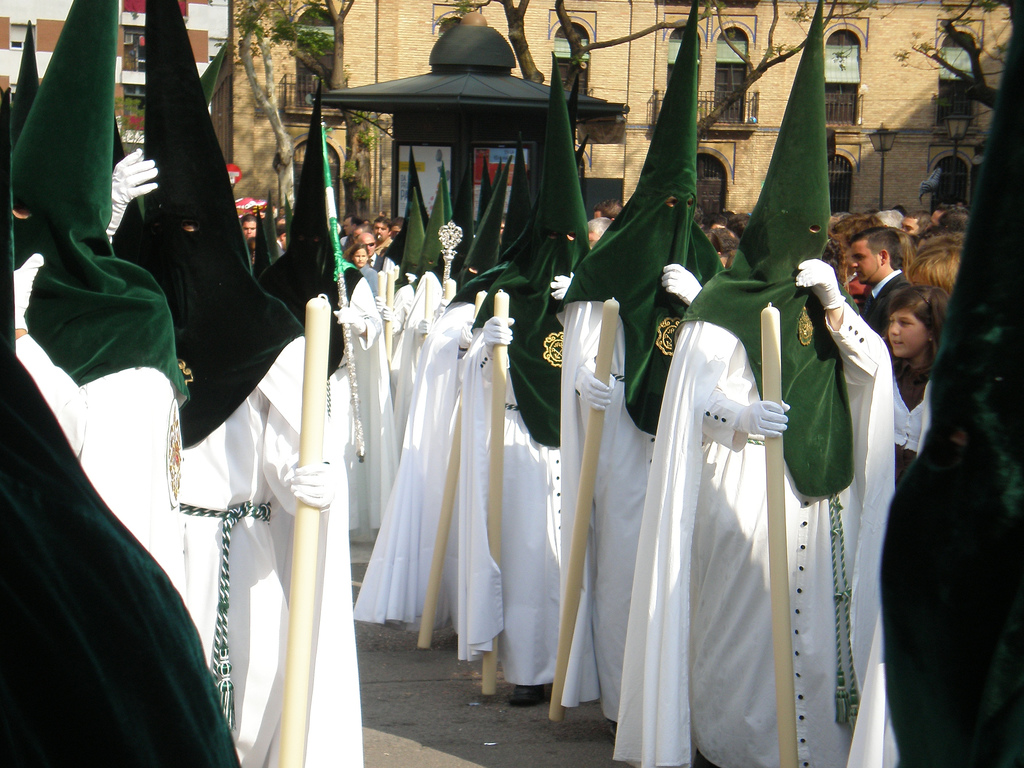
A type of hood called Capirote is being worn in Hispanic countries by members of a confraternity of penitents

The word traces back to Old English hod "hood," from Proto-Germanic *hodaz (cf. Old Saxon, Old Frisian hod "hood," Middle Dutch hoet, Dutch hoed "hat," Old High German huot "helmet, hat, Gugel", German Hut "hat," Old Frisian hode "guard, protection"), from PIE *kadh- "cover". The modern spelling was developed in the 15th century to indicate a "long" vowel, which is no longer pronounced as such.

== History and description ==
Historically, hoods were either similar to modern hoods, often forming part of a cloak or cape, or a separate form of headgear. Hoods with short capes, called chaperons in French, were extremely common in medieval Europe, and later evolved into big hats. Soft hoods were worn by men under hats. Hoods have also been used as part of uniforms for organizations such as the Ku Klux Klan.

A hood to hide or control the wearer often covers the whole head so that the wearer can see little or nothing, like a blindfold, or it can be used to prevent the wearer's identification. It may be used on or by a person who has been arrested or kidnapped, or about to suffer judicial execution; this practice is known as hooding. The hood may be simply a bag; it may be intended to be, and/or experienced as, humiliating (see hood event).

Traditional women's hoods varied from close-fitting, soft headgear (e.g. snood) to stiffened, structured hoods (e.g. gable hood) or very large coverings made of material over a frame which fashionable women wore over towering wigs or hairstyles to protect them from the elements (e.g. calash).

Today, fashion hoods are generally soft headcoverings that form part of a larger garment (e.g., an overcoat, shirt, or cloak; an exception is a rain hood, which is not part of a larger garment). They can be pulled up over the head when needed, or left to hang down the back when not. They may also be detachable, turning a winter overcoat into a summer one, or designed to be folded or rolled into a small pocket in the garment's neck when not in use. A familiar type of soft, smooth fashion hood is the visored bubble rainhood, which consists of a 3-section bucket-style bubble hood with its 2 side sections extending forward toward the center of the neck. The distinguishing feature is a curvy, wavy, U-bowl-shaped duckbill pouf visor, which serves as a shield to protect the eyes, so that rainwater or snow does not come into contact with the face. The rainhood visor is sometimes flipped slightly upwards, or cupped upwards into a pouf; the outermost swoop curve may then dip downwards towards the wearer's eyes for added protection. Small clips are affixed to the sides along the hood next to the visor to help it keep its pouffed shape.

== Types ==
The Inuit peoples of the Arctic are expert clothing manufacturers, and the women's anorak, technically called an amauti, features a large hood used to shelter an infant on its mother's back.

In Japan, hoods covered with chainmail or armor plates (tatami zukin) were worn by samurai warriors and their retainers.

Scuba divers who dive in cold water often wear neoprene wetsuit hoods for thermal insulation or watertight latex rubber drysuit hoods to prevent water ingress. They cover the whole head and neck except the face.

=== Academic dress ===
An academic hood is a component of academic dress that is often bright and decorative, worn over a gown and used only at graduations or on other special occasions. The shapes of the hoods of universities and colleges in the UK and many Commonwealth countries have been derived from those prescribed for the Universities of Oxford and Cambridge. Oxford bachelors and masters use a 'simple' (or 'Burgon' shape) consisting of hood with a cowl (headcovering) but without a cape, whereas the University of Cambridge uses a 'full' shape, with both cowl and square cape and substantial liripipe for all hoods. Other English universities use one of these patterns or adapt them; for example, the University of London uses the full Cambridge shape but with rounded corners to the cape. Newer universities, such as the University of Kent, use a hood with a triangular cape but with no cowl, and with a distinctive V-shaped segment denoting the faculty. The hoods of the University of Aberdeen have a rounded flat cape but no cowl.

The pattern of hoods in the US largely follows an intercollegiate code. The length of the hood and the width of its velvet trim indicate the academic achievement level of the wearer; the color of the trim indicates the discipline/field in which the degree is held; and the lining of hoods in academic dress represents the particular institution from which the degree was earned.

== See also ==
- Balaclava (clothing)
- Bondage hood
- Burqini
- French hood
- Gable hood
- Headscarf
- Hoodie
- Sartorial hijab
- Cucullus (disambiguation), a Latin word meaning hood
