= Chamberer =

A chamberer was a female attendant of an English queen regnant, queen consort, or princess. There were similar positions in aristocratic households.

== Chamberers at court ==
=== Duties ===
At court, the position was similar to a male groom of the privy chamber. The names of ten women who served Elizabeth I as chamberers are known. They were daughters of landowning gentry families. Duties could include some domestic labour, embroidery, and administration, as well as attendance on the queen. The details of the distinctions between women of the chamber and their hierarchy can be obscure.

An indication of chamberer's duties concerning the wardrobe of Elizabeth was included in a note written by William Cecil around 1560. Cecil was concerned about the risk that Elizabeth might be assassinated, especially by poisoning. He wanted increased security to the "chamberer's chambers, where laundresses, tailors, wardrobers, and such use to come". It was thought that assassins might apply poisons to perfumed gloves and other items of apparell brought to the queen and accepted by the chamberers.

Other servants present in the royal lodging who carried out laundry work were of lower status than chamberers, and were called "lavenders". Chamberers would embroider and launder some linen items, especially ruffs. In Scotland, Elizabeth Gibb, took on this role for Anne of Denmark, the queen consort of James VI and I, in 1590, making and looking after ruffs and other garments.

=== Politics and influence ===
Chamberers were close to the queen and could become influential. They could also provide information to inquisitive diplomats. The French ambassador Charles de Marillac obtained a description of Princess Mary in 1541 from a woman of her chamber (femme de chambre), presumably a chamberer, who had served her since infancy and was married to a French man.

Outside the Tudor court, Mary Halle alias Lassels, who gave evidence concerning Catherine Howard, Henry Mannox, and Alice Wilkes, had been a nurse and a chamberer to the "old Lady of Norfolk".

=== Chamberers and their rewards ===
Usually the queen was served by between two and four chamberers at any one time. Mary Tudor, Princess of Castille had three chamberers in 1508, including Mistress Parker and Mistress Gynes. In October 1511, Catherine of Aragon's chamberers Elizabeth Colins, Elizabeth Lisle, Margaret Pennington, and Elizabeth Vergas all received gowns of damask cloth trimmed with miniver and "lettice" fur, and in November 1514 her four chamberers received russet damask gowns trimmed with mink and "calabre". When Catherine Howard was sent to Syon House in November 1541, her household was reduced to four gentlewomen including Lady Baynton and two chamberers.

In December 1553, a warrant was issued for a yearly clothing allowance to the women of Mary's privy chamber, including the four chamberers Jane Russell, Elizabeth Golbourne, Barbara Rice, and Elizabeth Skirlock. Every Christmas, they would each receive 14 yards of satin and three yards of velvet, with an allowance for the making of a gown. The gentlewomen of the chamber would receive 15 yards of "good velvet".

An Elizabethan chamberer like Elizabeth Stafford would receive an annual fee of £20 or more, and livery clothing. A wage list from the 1580s notes four chamberers; Elizabeth Stafford (as "Lady Drury"), Mary Scudamore, Katherine Newton, and Jane Brussels. They received their allowances on Saint Andrew's Day. Elizabeth intervened in the marriage plans of some chamberers, and was angry at the marriage of Mary Scudamore, an indication of their status in her household. Jane Hawkes alias Brussels had her own servant, John Genowe, who got married in 1579.

Some chamberers, like Joan Russell and Elizabeth Marbery, continued their service as gentlewomen of the privy chamber or bed chamber, enjoying a higher status and salary. In November 1570, "Elyzabeth Marbury" signed for a gift of a petticoat of crimson cloth of gold, and the queen's laundress Elizabeth Smythson signed for her gift of satin and velvet kirtle.

Other women present in the queen's privy chamber included the Maids of Honour, who frequently received lavish gifts of clothing, and gentlewomen in attendance who did not receive a fee or livery clothes. These gentlewomen do not appear in financial records but their names are noted in lists of those at state occasions, especially funerals.

Chamberers took part in Royal Entries and coronations, including the coronation of Mary I of England where they rode in procession and were given different clothes for the service in the Abbey.

== Damsels and chamberers ==
In the context of household service in 15th-century England, a "damsel" was of higher or almost equivalent status to a chamberer. It has been suggested that the Latin terms, domicella camerae and domicella Reginae may distinguish a lady of the bedchamber or chamberer from a queen's maid of honour. Alice Perrers, a goldsmith's widow, became a damoiselle or domicella in the household of Philippa of Hainault, consort of Edward III.

=== Mary, Queen of Scots ===
In Scotland, the word "chamberer" was only rarely used in the records of the court. Two young women, Marie MacLeod and Margaret Fame, were maidens in the chamber of Mary, Queen of Scots. Margaret received linen or canvas used to line Mary's bed curtains and was described as the "famme de chanbre", the chamber woman. The accounts mention the "famis" (French, femmes, women) of Mary's chamber, including Alice Bog.

In France, in 1551, the "femmes de chambre" included Barbara Cochrane, the wife of the household clerk James Alexander, and Agathe Burgensis, who made linen items for Queen Mary. In 1560, six femmes de chambre worked in Mary's wardrobe, as washerwomen, or servants to the maids of honour, in 1562 in Scotland there were as many as fourteen.

Anthony Standen wrote that Mary's chamberer rode behind him when Mary and Darnley escaped from Holyrood Palace to Dunbar Castle after the murder of David Rizzio. An English commentator reported that Mary, Queen of Scots, was served by ladies, gentlewomen, and two "chamberers", one Scottish and one French, when she was a prisoner at Lochleven Castle in 1567. The French chamberer was Marie Courcelles, Mary mentioned the "deux fames" at Lochleven in a letter to Elizabeth I. An Italian account of her escape from Lochleven says that Mary wore the clothes of the elder of her two chamberers or maids, "s'era messe le vesti della maggior di due cameriere" and the younger servant was 10 years old.

=== Anne of Denmark ===
A document from 1592 concerning the Scottish household of Anne of Denmark, wife of James VI and I, mentions "damycelles" or damsels in her chamber. Their clothing allowance suggests they were of lower status than other attendants. "Little Anna", who married the preacher Johannes Sering was described as "ane woman of hir chalmer". Two of Anne of Denmark's servants in Scotland, Margaret Hartsyde and the aristocratic Anne Livingstone, came to her court in England after the Union of Crowns as chamberers. Hartsyde's status as a domestic servant was emphasised by her defence lawyers when she was accused of stealing the queen's jewels.

An ordinance for the English household of Anne of Denmark made on 20 July 1603 allows for six maids and a mother of maids and four chamberers.

In December 1603, Arbella Stuart discussed with Mary Talbot, Countess of Shrewsbury the delicate issue of buying New Year's Day gifts for Anne of Denmark. Stuart recommended asking the chamberer Margaret Hartsyde because she was discreet, and would let her "understand the Queenes minde with out knowing who asked it". The role of chamberers and chamber women in giving valuable advice to gift-givers can be seen in records of the court of Elizabeth I, and conferred prestige and power.

Chamberers could enjoy substantial rewards, one Danish servant, Dorothea Silking, was granted rights to run a coal mine in Somerset on the queen's jointure manor of Corston. Employment of chamberers from the country of origin provided continuity of service and a cultural bridge for queens consort in the early modern period.

== Chamberers to Margaret Tudor, Queen of Scots ==
- Francisca Baptiste (1503).
- Catherine Crow.
- Margaret Dennet
- Joanna and Margery Rutherford.

== Chamberers to Catherine of Aragon ==
- Maria and Kateryn de Gavara.
- Isabel de Vanegas, or Inés Vanegas, first a governess, and her daughters Inés and Teresa.
- Elizabeth Collins.
- Margaret and Margery Kempe, at the Field of the Cloth of Gold.
- Elizabeth Kempe.
- Elizabeth Lisle.
- Anne Luke
- Blanche Marbury.
- Margaret Mulsho.
- Margaret Pennington.
- Dame Margaret Pole
- Mistress Redynge

== Chamberers to Mary Tudor, Queen of France ==
- Elizabeth Bradshaw
- Jane Barners, described as "Jehanne Barnesse, chamberiere".
- Alice Dennis (1514).
- Anne Jerningham (1514), described as a "femme de chambre".

== Chamberers to Anne Boleyn ==
- Former chamberers of Catherine of Aragon

== Chamberers to Anne of Cleves ==
- Susanna Horenbout.
- Anne Josselyn the elder (1539)
- Elizabeth Rastall (1539)

== Chamberers to Catherine Howard ==
- Joan Bulmer.
- Katherine Tylney.
- Alice Wilkes.

== Chamberers to Catherine Parr ==
- Mary Odell

== Chamberers to Mary I of England ==
- Baptiste (in 1525).
- Cecily Barnes, (in 1536).
- Edith Brediman.
- Lucretia the Tumbler, (in 1536).
- Mary Brown.
- Jane Dormer
- Barbara Eyre
- Elizabeth Golbourne, who married William Babington of Kiddington.
- Frideswide Knight (in 1533).
- Alice Parker or Mrs Parker (in 1525 and 1533).
- Jane or Joan Russell (died 1558). wife of William Russell, a Groom of the Chamber to Elizabeth. Later described as a gentlewoman of Mary's privy chamber, she died in the London house of Henry Fisher (MP).
- Mrs Barbara Ryce, her husband William Ryce (died 1588) was also a royal servant. Beatrice ap Rice was Mary's laundress.
- Elizabeth Scurlock or Sturlock, possibly married to the physician Rowland Scurlock.

== Chamberers to Elizabeth I ==
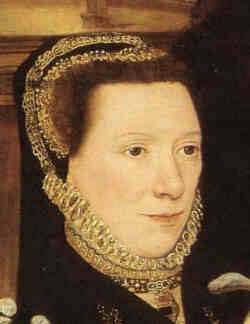
Frances Newton was a chamberer to Elizabeth I

- Alice Huntercombe.
- Jane Bradbelt and her daughter Dorothy Bradbelt (or Broadbent).
- Jane Brussels alias Hawkes (died 1596), who married William Heneage (died 1610) in 1591. According to an inscription at Hainton, she served 24 years in Elizabeth's bedchamber.
- Elizabeth Marbery, replacing Elizabeth Sands in 1554.
- Frances Newton (1559-1560)
- Nazareth Newton
- Mary Shelton (1567-1603), appointed a chamberer of the privy chamber on 1 January 1571.
- Elizabeth Stafford Drury.
- Margaret Vaughan

== Chamberers to Anne of Denmark ==
- Margaret Hartsyde
- Anne Livingstone.
- Anna Rumler
- Dorothea Silking
- Dorothy Speckard

== Chamberers to Henrietta Maria ==
- Elizabeth Coignet, daughter of Françoise de Monbodeac, Madame Garnier, first lady of the bedchamber.
- Mademoiselle Vantelet, wife of the usher Jacques de Lux.

== See also ==
- Woman of the Bedchamber
- Première femme de Chambre
- Kammarfru
