= Anthony Restwold =

16th-century English politician

Anthony Restwold (bef. 1517 – c. 1555/60) was an English politician who served during the third parliament of Mary I of England. He was married to Alice Wilkes, one of the significant witness in Queen Catherine Howard's trial for treason and adultery.

== Biography ==
Restwold was the third but first surviving son of Edward Restwold of the Vache and Agnes Restwold (née Cheyne, later Waterton), the daughter of John Cheyne of Drayton Beauchamp. He was married to Alice Wilkes, who a member of the household of Agnes Howard, Duchess of Norfolk and was a significant witness in Queen Catherine Howard's trial for treason and adultery.

Redtwold was a servant of Lord Mautravers in 1541. He was a member (MP) of the parliament of England for New Woodstock in November 1554 and for Aylesbury in 1555.

Restwold died between 1555 and 1560. Neither a will nor inquisition post mortem (IPM) survives for Restwold, but by 1560 his sisters and coheirs, with their husbands, had licence to alienate one of his estates, so he died before this time.
