= Alice Wilkes =

Servant to Catherine Howard (16th century)

Alice Wilkes (also spelt Welkes, married name Alice Restwold) was an English servant to Catherine Howard, the fifth wife of Henry VIII of England and was a significant witness in Queen Catherine's trial for treason and adultery.

== Biography ==
Wilkes was member of the household of Agnes Howard, Duchess of Norfolk, with Catherine Howard. When Catherine became queen, Wilkes was appointed as one of her chamberers. Catherine Howard gave Wilkes "upper and nether habiliments of goldsmith's work for the French hood and a tablet of gold".

Wilkes was a significant witness in Queen Catherine's trial for treason and adultery. She was first questioned about her former mistress on 5 November 1541 and by 22 December had "pleaded guilty to misprision of treason as having concealed the facts of the Queen’s behaviour."

After questioning, Wilkes informed that Francis Dereham had spent his nights in Catherine’s bed whilst in the household of Agnes Howard 1538, prior to her marriage to the King. Wilkes also slept in this bed and was allegedly "so irritated by the couples puffing and blowing" as they had sex that she asked to switch beds.

Alice's husband was Anthony Restwold, the son of Edward Restwold and Agnes Restwold (née Cheyne, later Waterton). He was a Member (MP) of the Parliament of England for New Woodstock in November 1554 and for Aylesbury in 1555.
