= Cucullus =

Cucullus may refer to:

- a Latin word referring to a hood of a garment, as in cucullus non facit monachum (The hood does not make the monk)
- a substructure of the valva, a structure in male insects that is used to hold the female during copulation
- a hood over the head of Ricinulei arachnids
- a synonym for Conus, the cone snails, a genus of predatory sea snails

== See also ==
- Colpoda cucullus, a ciliate
- Trochoidea cucullus, a species of air-breathing land snail
- Cuculus, a bird genus
