= French hood =

Woman's headgear

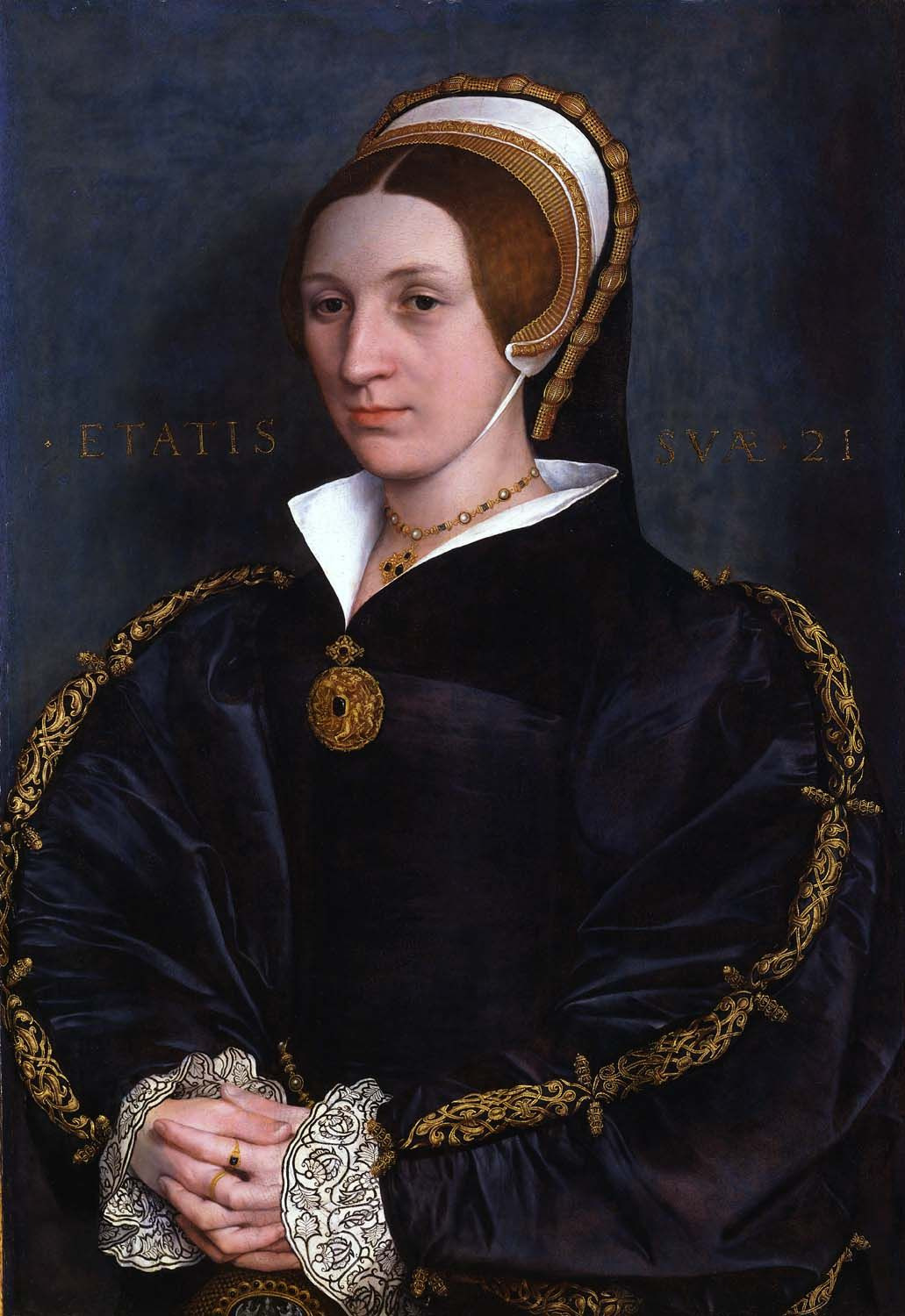
A lady, probably of the Cromwell family, wearing a French hood. Hans Holbein the Younger, c. 1540

French hood is the English name for a type of elite woman's headgear that was popular in Western Europe in roughly the first half of the 16th century.

The French hood is characterized by a rounded shape, contrasted with the angular "English" or gable hood. It is worn over a coif, and has a black veil attached to the back, which fully covers the hair. Unlike the more conservative gable hood, it displays the front part of the hair.

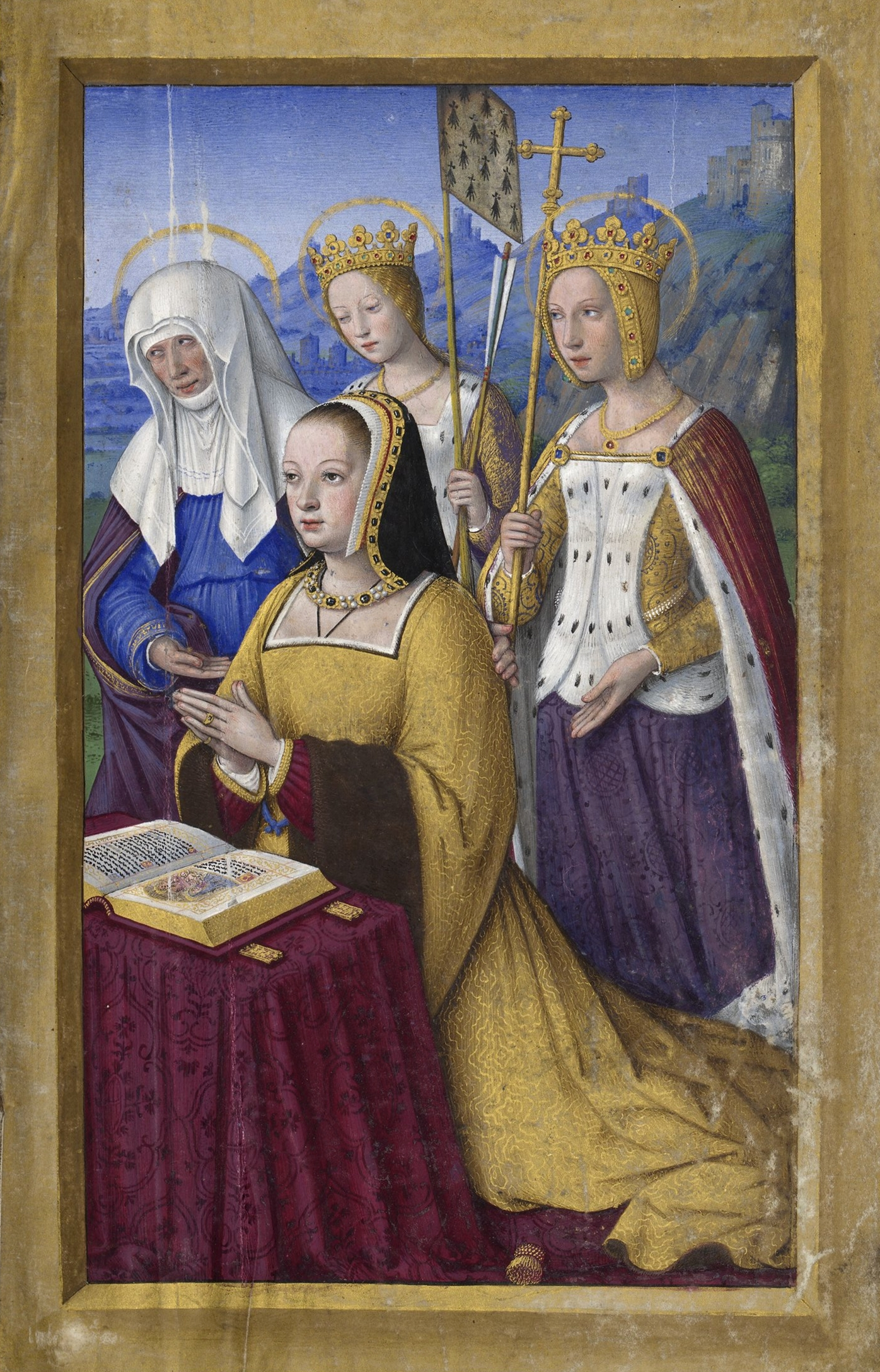
Anne of Brittany with her patron saints, Anne, Ursula (with the arms of Brittany on a pennant) and Catherine of Alexandria, a princess who also wears one under her crown. Grandes Heures of Anne of Brittany, folio 3.

In France it was known as a cape Bretonne ("Breton hood"), after Anne of Brittany, Queen of France from 1491, and also the last reigning Duchess of Brittany. She wears it in portraits, including one in her Grandes Heures of Anne of Brittany of 1503–1508, and her ladies are often also depicted wearing it.

The French hood had a complicated and varied construction, with several layers of fabric, as well as jewels, wire, and perhaps metal bands. No examples survive, so aspects of its construction remain uncertain.

== History in England ==
Although popularly associated with Anne Boleyn, who had spent time in the French court, it was probably introduced to the English court by Mary Tudor, Queen of France, who is depicted wearing one in a wedding portrait from around 1516. Catherine of Aragon bought a French hood for her daughter Mary in March 1520.

However, English women at the time mostly wore the gable hood, and the French hood did not achieve much popularity in England until the 1530s and 1540s. In September 1537, Lady Lisle requested from the merchant William le Gras: "many hats, such as the ladies wear in France, for now the ladies here follow the French fashion." Despite its growth in popularity, Queen Jane Seymour apparently forbade her ladies from wearing the French hood, perhaps because it had been favoured by her executed predecessor Anne Boleyn. John Husee informed Lady Lisle that her daughter, Anne Bassett, an attendant to the Queen, was required to instead wear a "bonnet and frontlet of velvet", lamenting that it "became her nothing so well as the French hood."

According the Chronicle of the Grey Friars, the French hood and the jewelled gold billament became popular when Anne of Cleves came to England in 1540. Other sources detail that Anne of Cleves wore rich attires in the German fashion when she arrived in England, and adopted the French hood in the days after her wedding. Edward Hall wrote that the English fashion for the French hood suited her:

[Anne of Cleves] was appareiled after the Englishe fassion, with a Frenche whode, which so set furth her beautie and good visage, that every creature rejoysed to behold her.

Most examples from this period are seen in portraits of women who were in service to one of Henry VIII's wives, implying that it was primarily a court fashion. Princess Mary gave Margaret Douglas the "frontlet" or coif of a hood as a result of a bet in 1540. In 1551, Petruccio Ubaldini wrote that English noble ladies all wore a "small hat of French fashion", while other classes wore caps of fur or linen. Mary I of England preferred French hoods. As the century progressed, the French hood became smaller and more curved, and was worn further back on the head. By 1589, a variety of hoods were worn at the court of Elizabeth I, and Philip Gawdy was unable to advise his sister what the fashion was.

=== Habilments or billaments ===
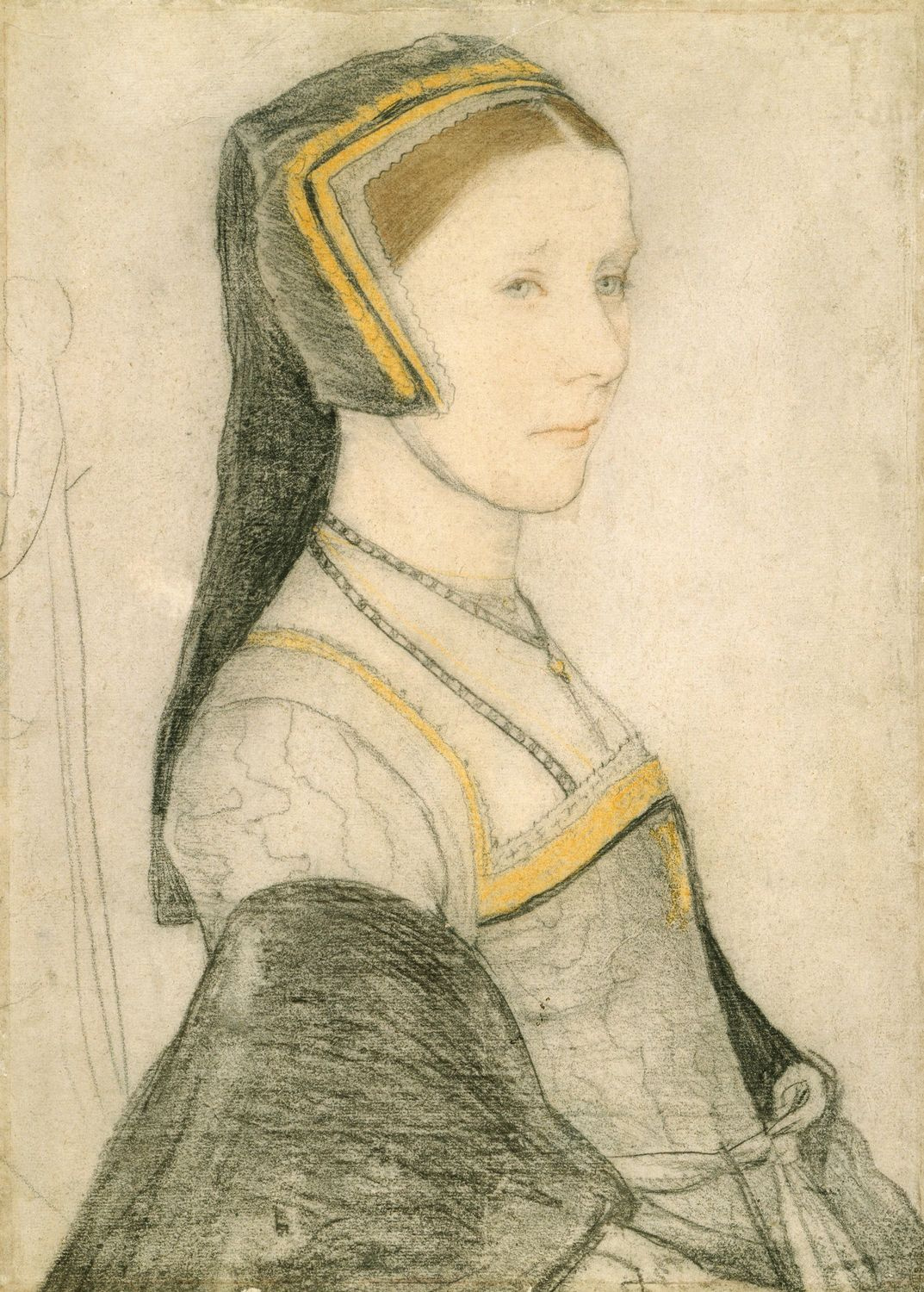
Thomas More was said to have refused to buy a billiment for Anne Cresacre, here drawn by Holbein in a "transitional" hood

The front of the hood could be decorated with a jewelled band, in England called a "habilment or "billement", (see below). An English dictionary of 1574 described "billimentes" as "the attire or ornament of a women's head, or neck, as a bonnet, a French hood, a paste, or such like".

In the early 1540s, Henry VIII passed a sumptuary law restricting the usage of "any Frenche hood or bonnet of velvett with any habiliment, paste, or egg [edge] of gold, pearl, or stone" to the wives of men with at least one horse. According to an early biography of Thomas More, he refused to give his ward and daughter-in-law Anne Cresacre a billiment set with pearls, and instead he gave one set with white peas as a lesson.

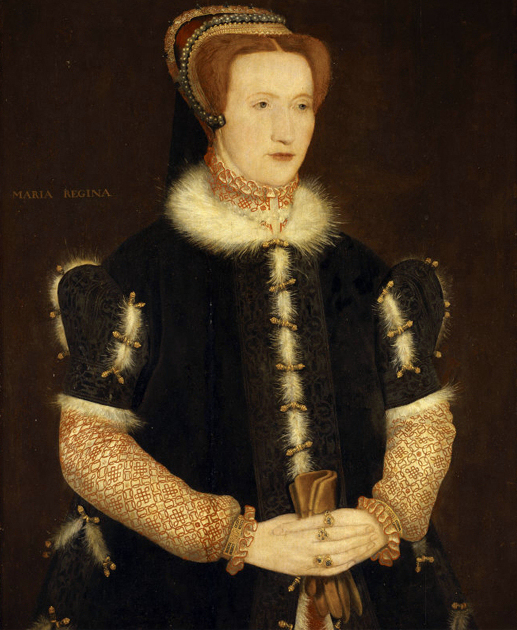
Bess of Hardwick in the 1550s.

Catherine Howard gave "upper and nether habiliments of goldsmith's work for a French hood" to Alice Wilkes. The English courtier Elizabeth Holland owned four pairs of upper and nether "billyments of goldsmith's work" in 1547. Katherine Brandon, Duchess of Suffolk owned several pairs of gold billaments, set with table and pointed diamonds, rubies, or pearls, and enamelled. At her trial and execution in 1553, Lady Jane Grey wore a "French hood, all black, with a black byllyment".

Mary I of England gave gold billaments to some of her gentlewomen to wear at her coronation in 1553. Accounts of the wardrobe of Mary I and Elizabeth I show that the fabric band itself was also called a "billiment". Mary Radcliffe made billiments for Queen Elizabeth's hoods from white satin and Elizabeth, Lady Carew, made the hoods from black velvet and satin.

In 1550, Bess of Hardwick's husband William St Loe paid £11 for "my wyffes billymentes". Her step-daughter Catherine's "belymente" cost 28 shillings. Bess was depicted in portraits wearing a French hood and billament. A 1556 list of clothing that had belonged to Jane Tyldesley of Wardley, a Lancashire gentlewoman, includes "ij ffrench hoodes with a billiment of sylver gylde". In 1582, Anne Petre, widow of Sir William Petre, bequeathed to her daughter-in-law, Mary Petre, a billiment of goldsmith work with black enamel, thirteen pieces set with nine pearls, and fourteen pieces without pearls.

As a New Year's Day gift for 1585, Christopher Hatton gave Queen Elizabeth upper and nether "abillements" of gold with pieces shaped as hearts and imperial crowns set with rubies, diamonds, and peaerls. In January 1586, the Countess of Bath gave Elizabeth gold upper and nether "abillyments" set with seed pearls.

=== Depiction on tomb effigies ===
French hoods were depicted on tomb monuments and can provide useful evidence for modern reconstructions. A 1581 contract made by George Shirley with the sculptors Richard and Gabriel Roiley included an alabaster effigy at Somerton to represent the wife of Thomas Fermor, "a picture or portraiture of a faire gentlewoman with a Frenchehood, edge and abilliment, with all other apparel, furniture, jewels, ornaments, and things usual decent and seemly for a gentlewoman".

== Scotland ==
A clothing account from 1538 mentions a "hood of the French sort" made from black velvet and lined with red "crammesy" satin for Jane Stewart one of the daughters of James V. The coif or frontlet was embellished with a gold "chafferoun" of Paris or filigree work made by John Mosman. Black velvet was also bought for a long "kathit hood of the French fashion". The inventories of the jewels of Mary, Queen of Scots, include several pairs of jewelled "billiments" worn at the front of a hood. They were described using a French word, bordure. Sources written in Scots call these accessories "garnishings".

== Construction ==
The various elements of the French hood are as follows:

- Coif – Made of linen, tied under the chin or possibly secured to the hair with pins, the coif was almost always white from the first quarter of the 16th century onward, with a fashion for early French hoods having red coifs existing prior to 1520.
- Crepine – A pleated or gathered head covering made from fine linen or silk, the crepine was sometimes worn without a coif, and may have been the origin of the pleated frill seen at the edge of the coif. The crepine could also possibly have been the bag-like attachment seen at the back of early French hoods, worn without a veil.
- Paste – Worn over the coif/crepine. More than one in a contrasting color could be worn at a time, possibly derives its name from the paste used to stiffen it, or from the term 'passé' meaning "border", derived from the effect of a border of contrasting color on the French hood. Lady Jane Grey was said to wear a "froes paste" and this phrase occurs in the 1550 accounts for Margaret Willoughby's clothes. Willoughby was also bought a "crepine".
- Veil – The "hood" portion, almost always black. Could be made from wool, or silk velvet or satin. It hung in a "straight fall" fashion and covered the back hair completely.
- Billaments, Biliments, or Habilments – Sometimes referred to as "upper" and "lower" billaments, these formed the decorative border along the upper edge of the hood and the front edge of the coif or paste. Several billements are detailed in a list of jewels belonging to Anne Seymour, Duchess of Somerset in 1549. Wardrobe accounts of velvet and satin for the making of billaments may refer to the base upon which the goldwork, jewels, and pearling was attached.
- Cornet/Bongrace/Shadow – A visor-like accessory that shaded the wearer's eyes. Later in the century, when the veil of the hood was flipped up on top of the wearer's head and pinned in place to shade the eyes, this was also apparently termed a "bongrace" or "shadow", as it protected the face from the sun.

As there are no known extant French hoods in existence, the precise details of its construction remain a mystery. It is often interpreted as featuring a stiff, protruding crescent, but statues from the period indicate it laid flat on the wearer's head.

== Gallery ==
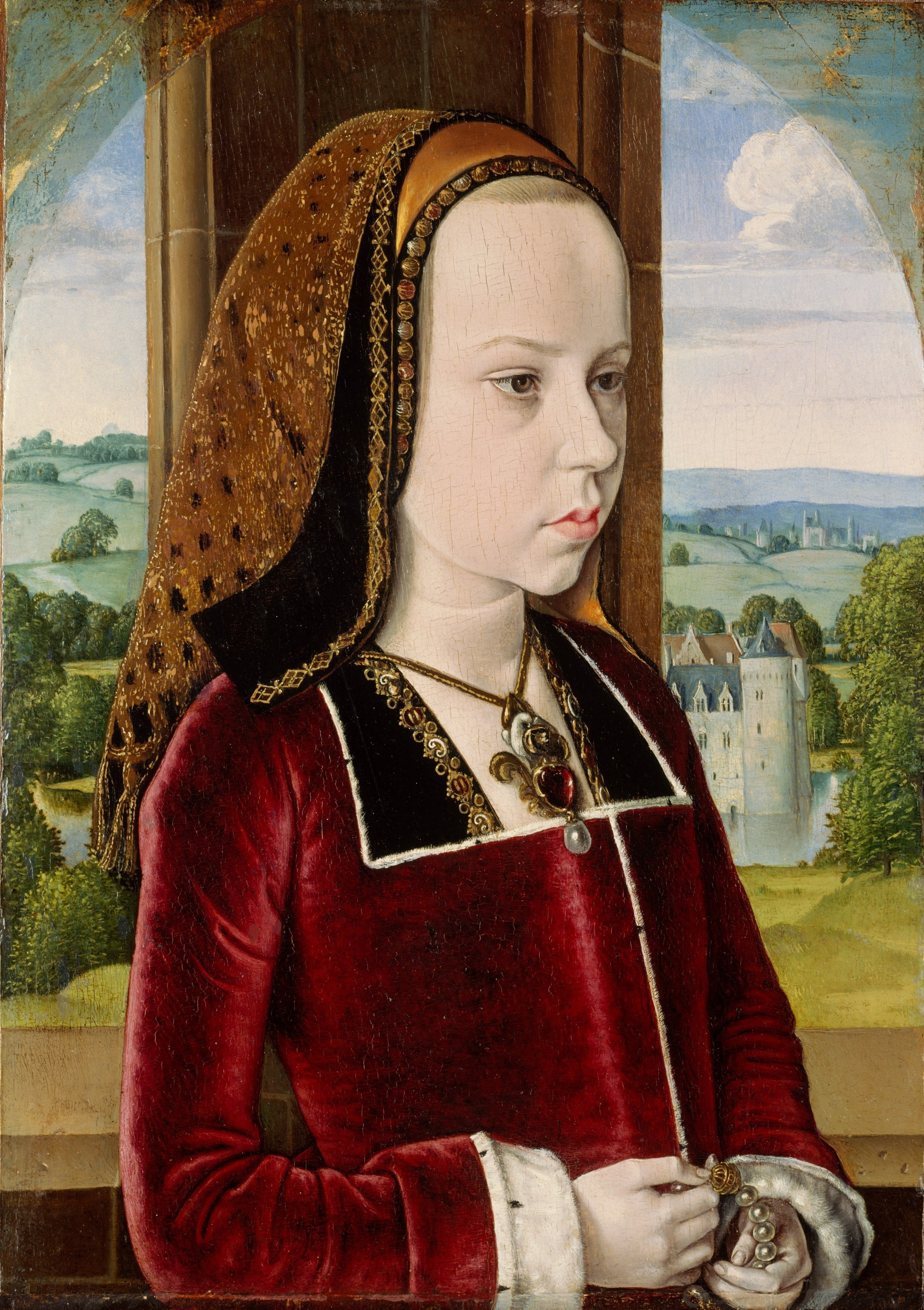
Margaret of Austria, then living in France, at about ten by Jean Hey, c. 1490

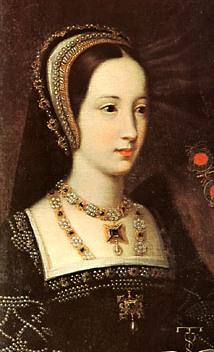
Mary Tudor, Queen of France c. 1516

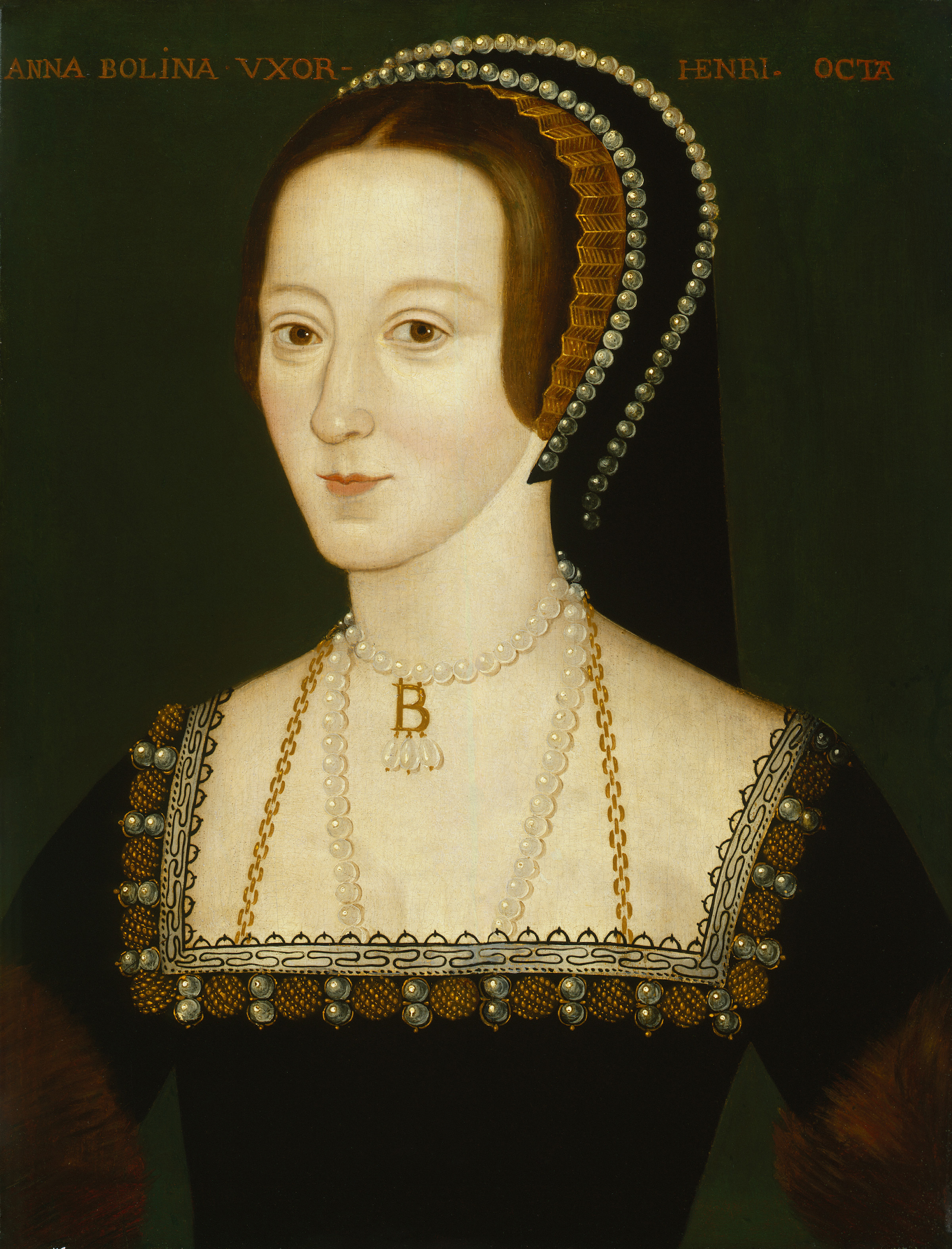
Anne Boleyn, late 16th century copy of a lost original

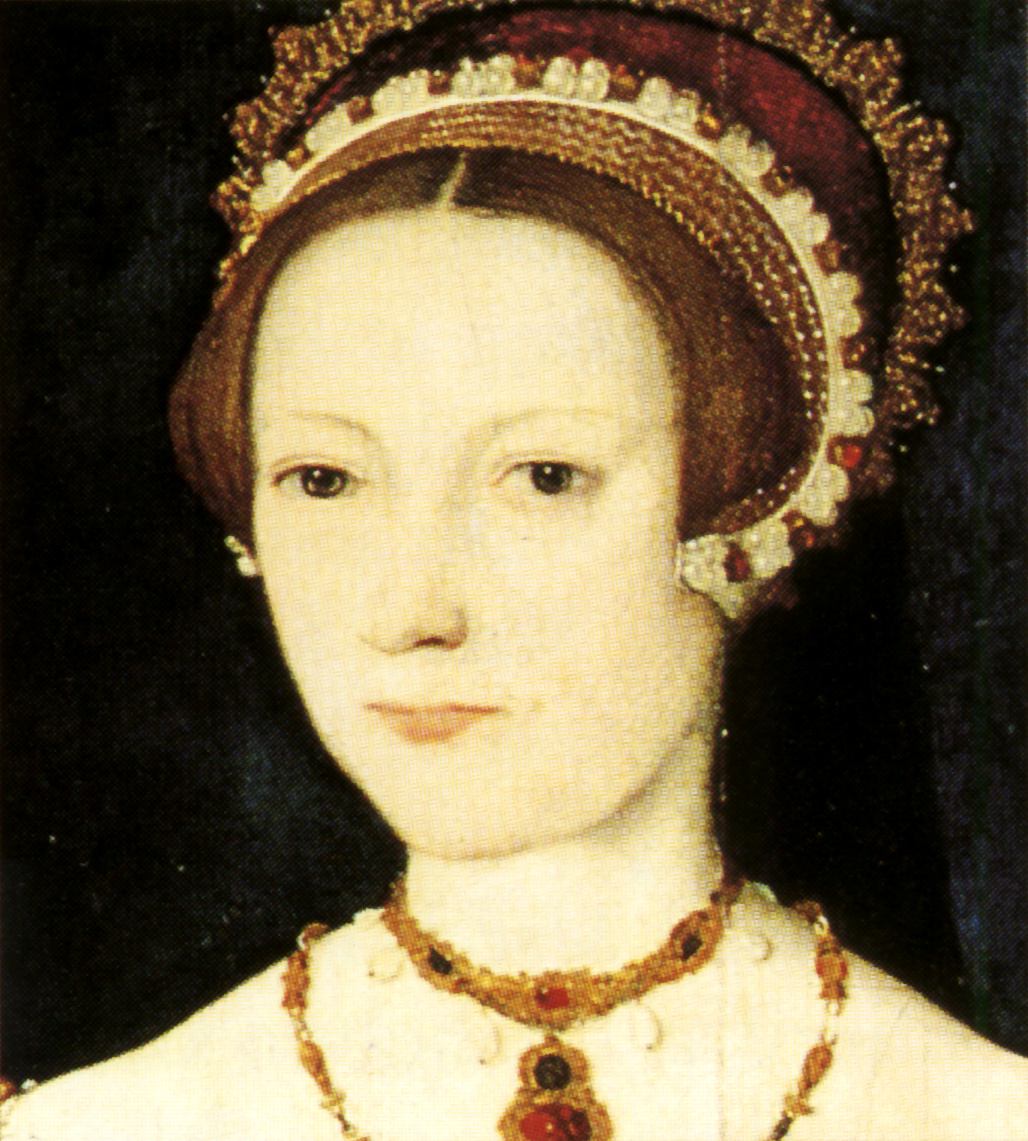
Catherine Parr wears a more curved French hood characteristic of the 1540s, c. 1545

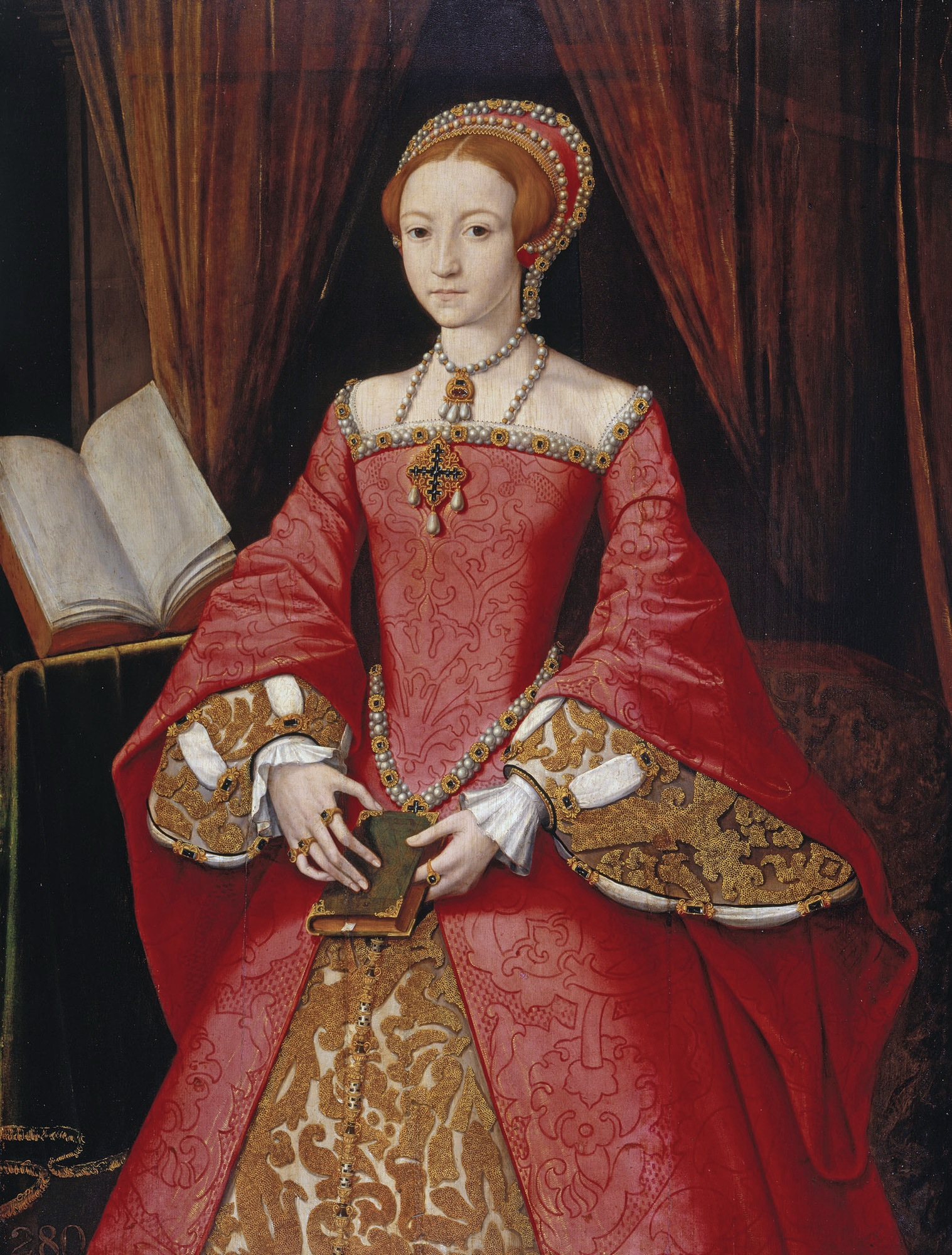
Princess Elizabeth Tudor, c. 1546

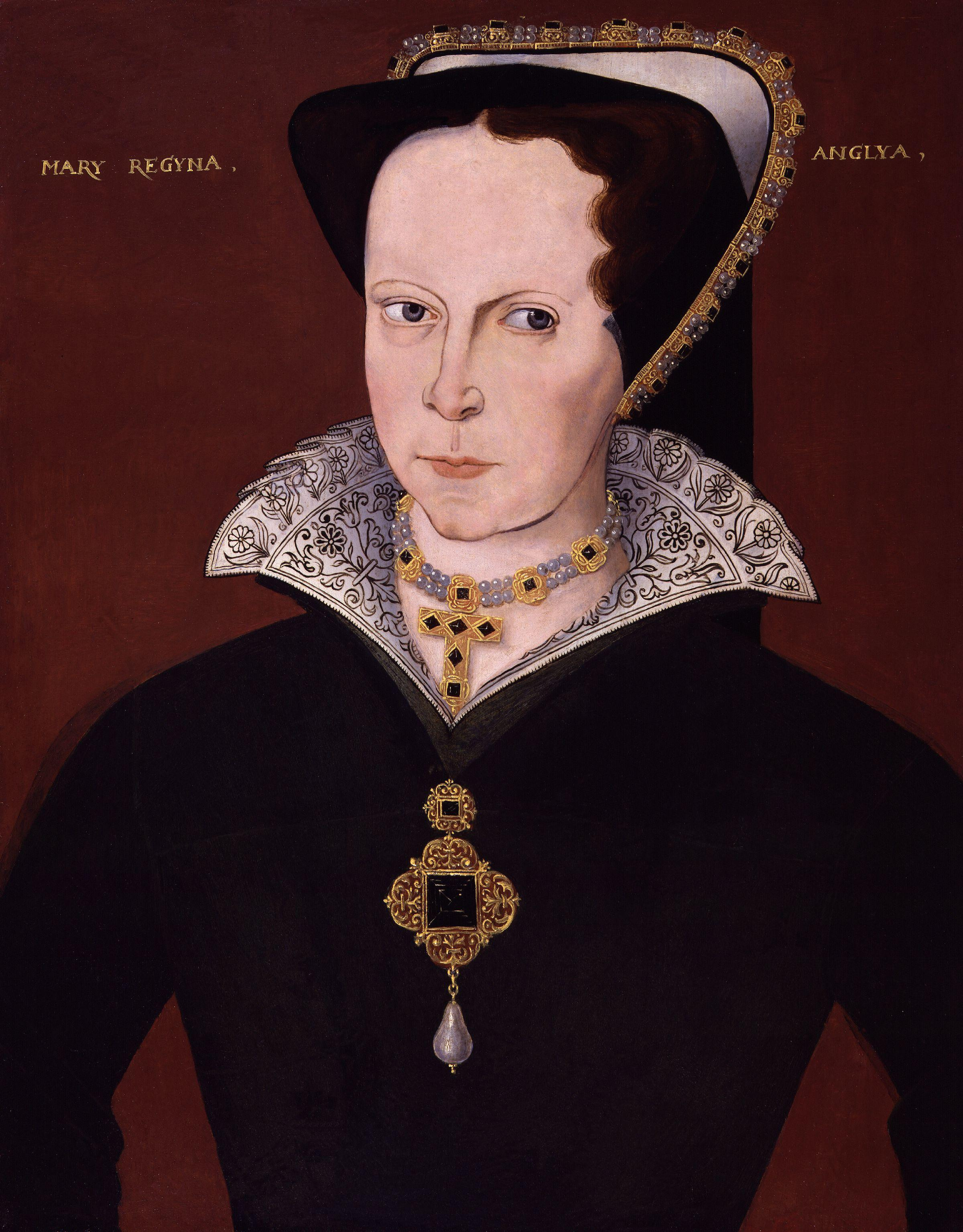
Queen Mary I, "Squared" French hood, English, c. 1555

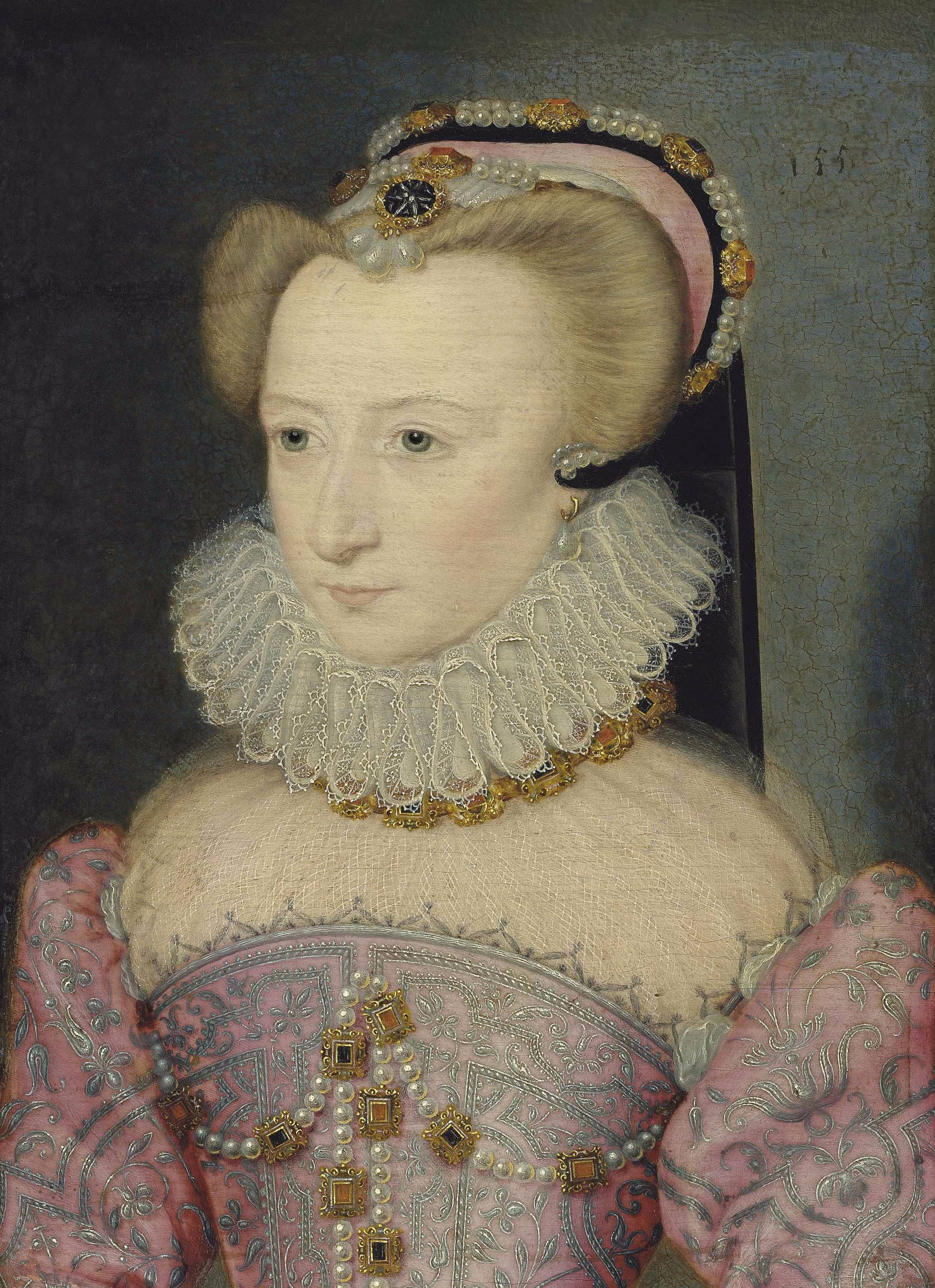
Louise de Lorraine (?), c. 1570s

== See also ==
- 1500–1550 in fashion
- 1550–1600 in fashion
- Kokoshnik
