= Gable hood =

English woman's headdress of the early 16th century

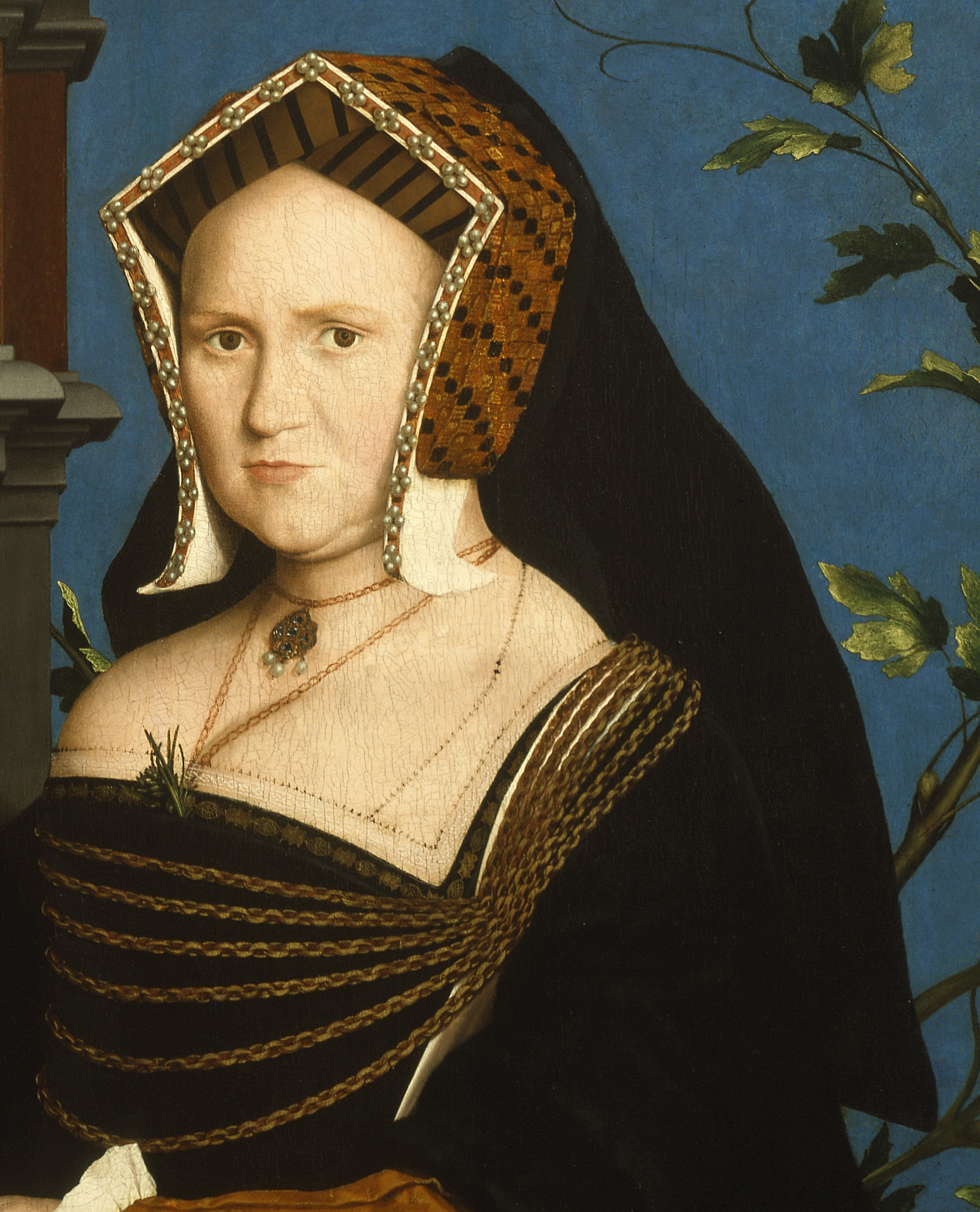
Gable hood with pinned-up lappets and a hanging veil. Mary, Lady Guildford, by Hans Holbein the Younger, 1527.

A gable hood, English hood or gable headdress is an English woman's headdress of c. 1500–1550, so called because its pointed shape resembles the architectural feature of the same name. The contemporary French hood was rounded in outline and unlike the gable hood, less conservative, displaying the frontal part of the wearer's hair.

== Description ==
The gable hood was originally a simple pointed hood with decorated side panels called lappets and a veil at the back. Over time, it became a complex construction stiffened with buckram, having a box-shaped back and two tube-shaped hanging veils at 90-degree angles. The hanging veils and lappets could be pinned up in a variety of ways to make complex headdresses.

Generally, the gable hood consisted of four parts: the paste, lappets, veil, and decorative jewels (for the most aristocratic only). The paste was a white, stiffened version of the coif, with drawstrings at the back to adjust to the wearer's head. The lappets were then pinned to the paste, and either left to hang or pinned to the side of the head; the veil was then attached. The jewels were mounted on a stiff foundation that could be sewn to the paste, acting not only as decoration but as something to create a more rigid structure. A striped silk undercap could also be worn to fully cover the hair.

== Tudor court ==
The privy purse accounts of Elizabeth of York include payments to Mistress Lokke, a silkwoman, who supplied her with frontlets and bonnets, and for the purchase of a gold frontlet. After her marriage in 1514, when making a Royal Entry to Abbeville, Mary Tudor, Queen of France, wore a gown of cloth of silver and an English-style gable hood. In 1517, Lady Catherine Gordon, the Scottish widow of Perkin Warbeck, owned a gold "flat chain for paste" for wearing on her hood.

In 1537, Jane Seymour forbade her gentlewomen from wearing the newly fashionable French hood, apparently preferring the gable style. John Husee informed Lady Lisle that her daughter, as an attendant to the Queen, was required to instead wear a "bonnet and frontlet of velvet", lamenting that it "became her nothing so well as the French hood".

== Gallery ==
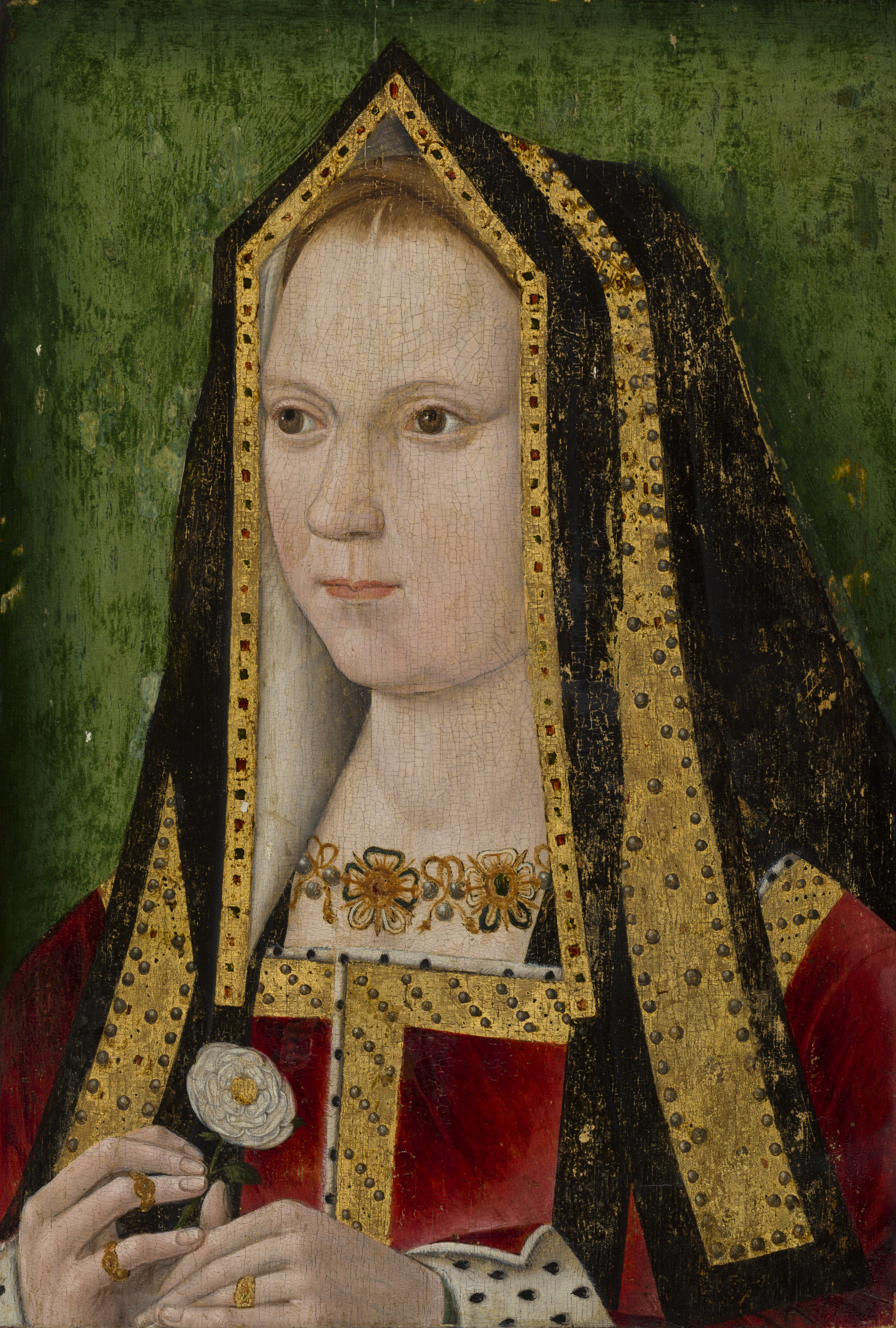
Early gable hood: Elizabeth of York (died 1503).

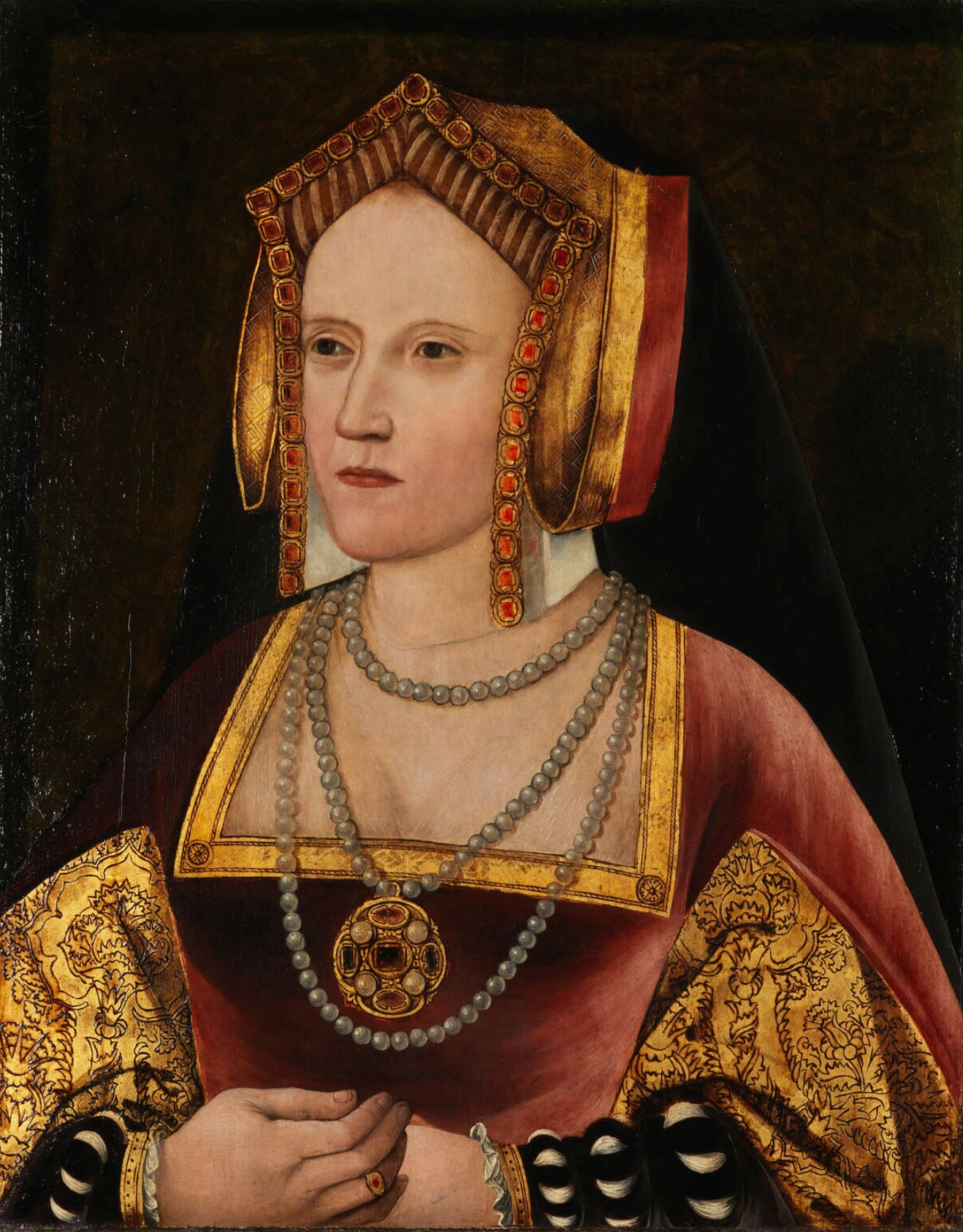
So-called Lambeth Portrait of Catherine of Aragon, Queen of England wearing a gable hood, c. 1520.

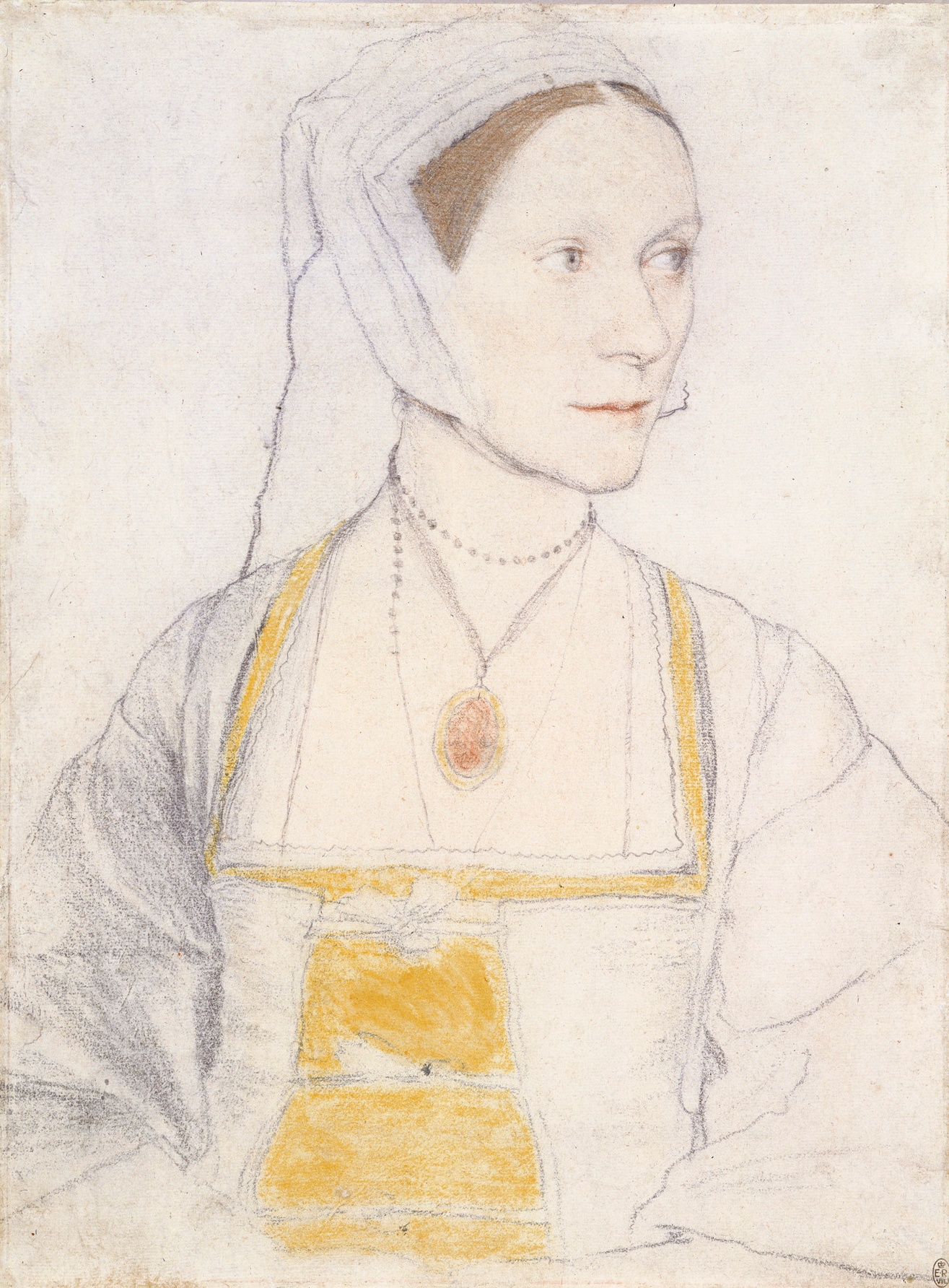
Holbein sketch of Cecily Heron (née More), preparatory sketch for The Family of Sir Thomas More, c. 1527.

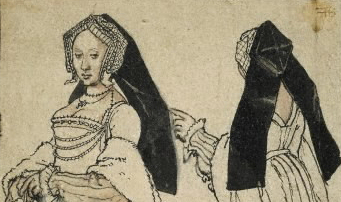
Front and back views of a box-backed gable hood of c. 1528–30. Detail of a drawing by Hans Holbein.

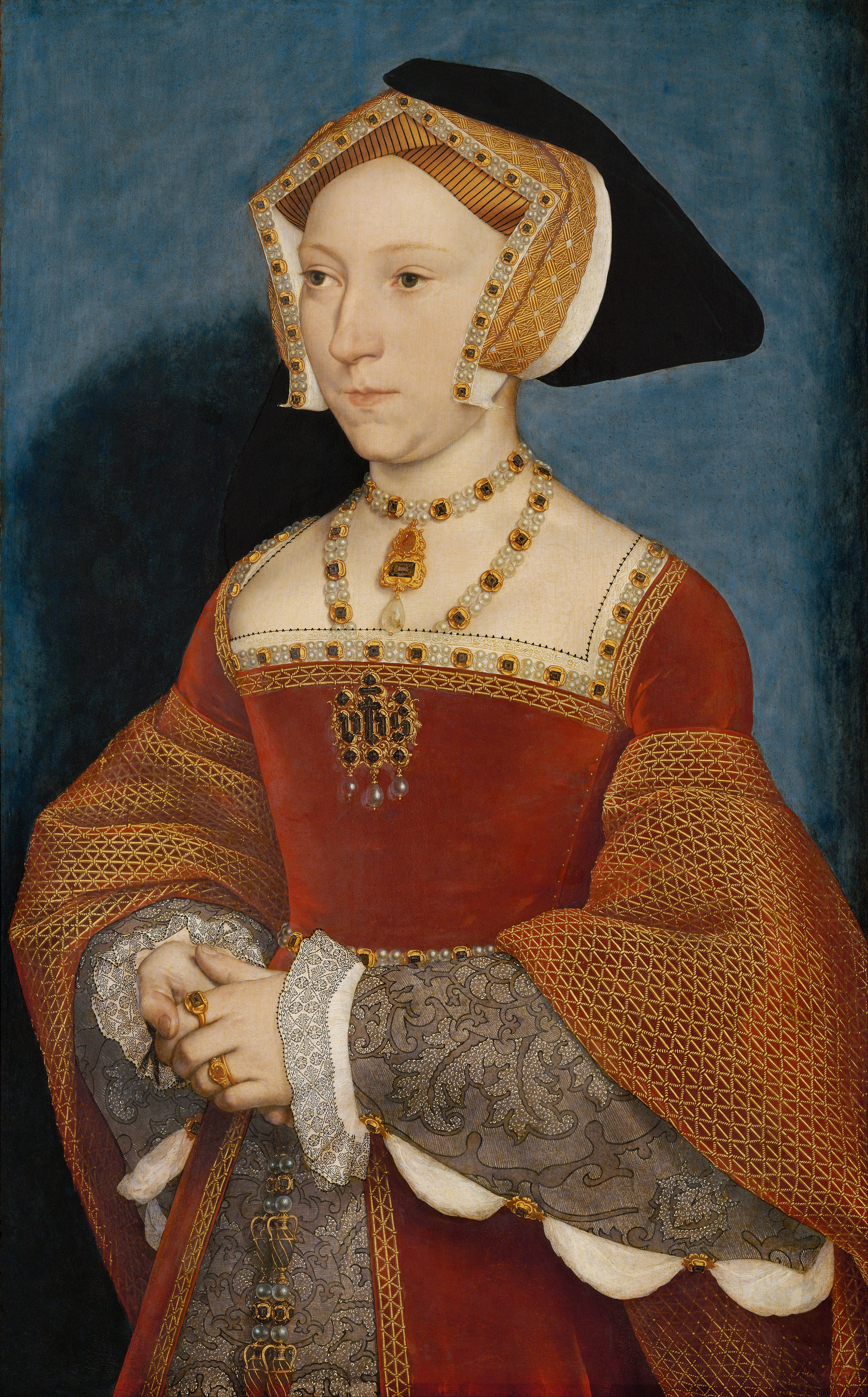
Holbein, Jane Seymour, 1536–37.

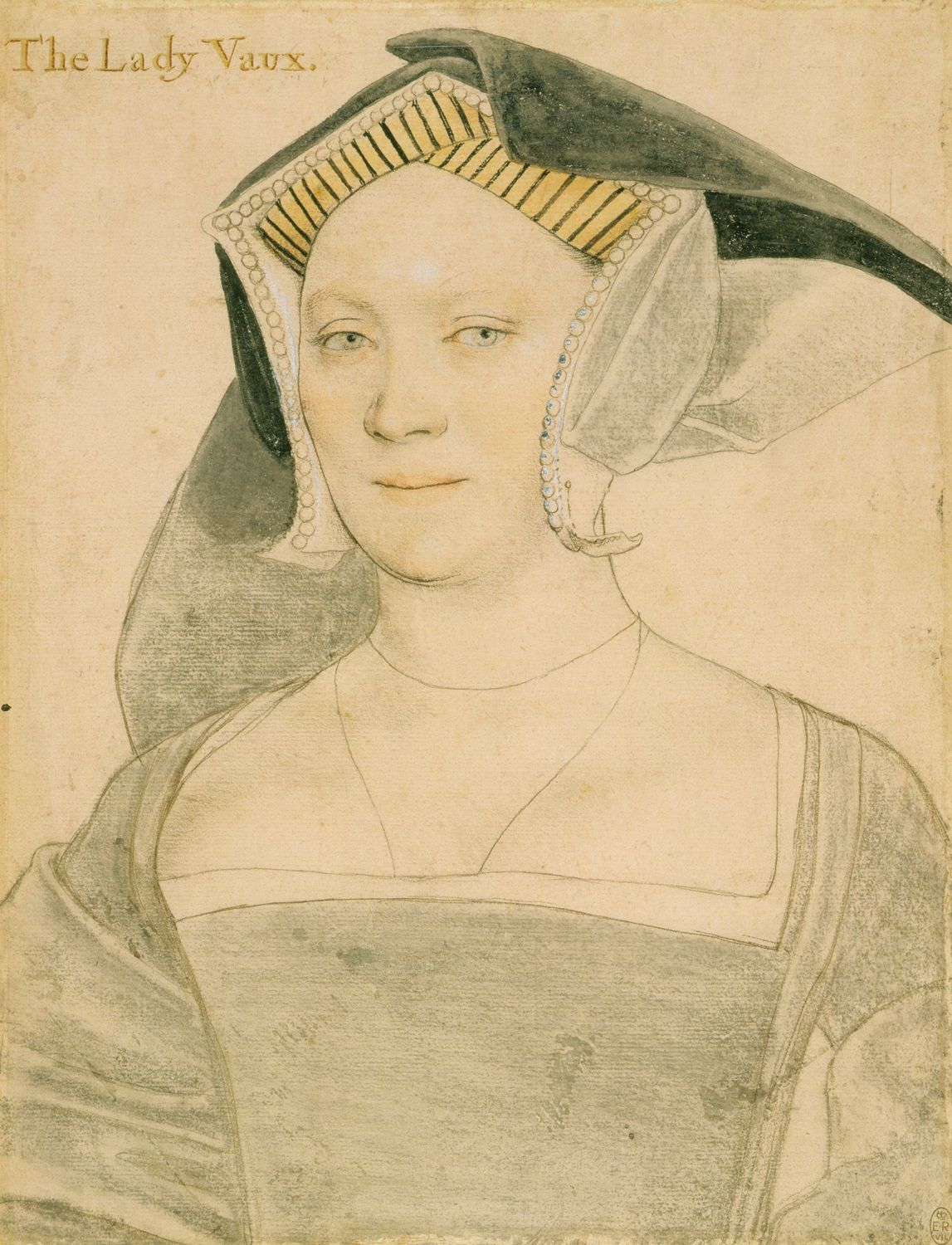
Elisabeth, Lady Vaux, depicted in a gable hood with lappets and one side of veil pinned up by Holbein, c. 1536.

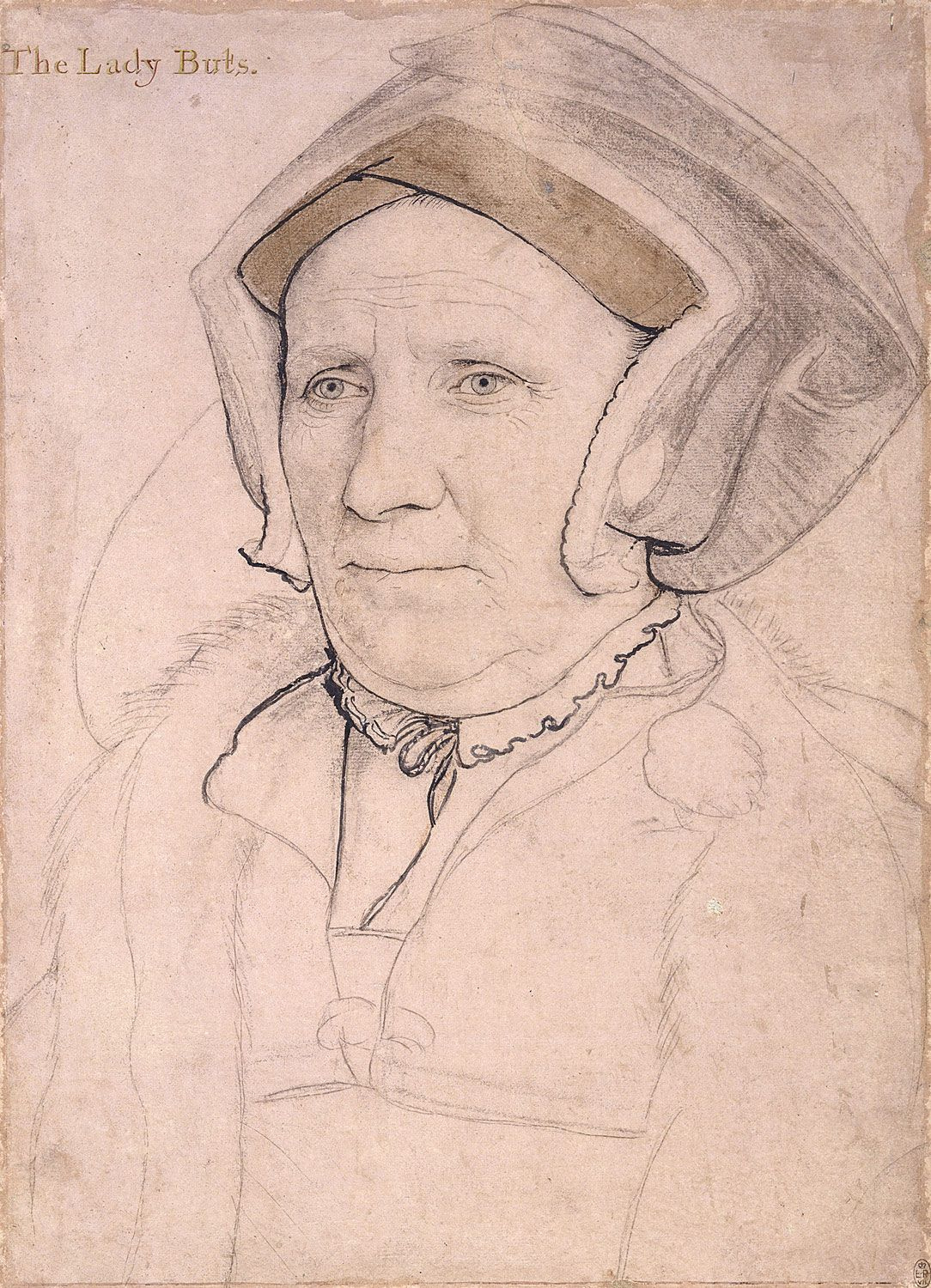
Holbein sketch of Margaret, Lady Butts, c. 1541–1543.

== See also ==
- 1500–1550 in Western European fashion
