= Marie MacLeod =

Scottish aristocrat

Marie MacLeod was a Scottish aristocrat at the court of Mary, Queen of Scots.

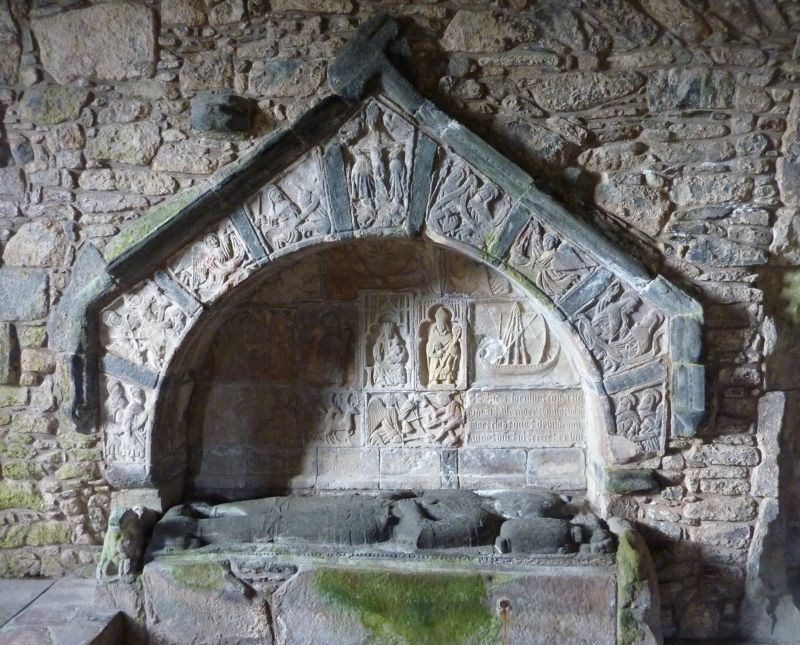
The tomb of Marie's grandfather at St Clement's Church, Rodel

Marie MacLeod was the daughter and heir of William MacLeod of Harris, and a granddaughter of Alasdair Crotach MacLeod. Her name was sometimes spelled "McCloyde" or "McCloid", or "Marie Clawde". She is regarded as a Chief of the Clan McLeod.

After her father died, in 1562 Queen Mary sent orders to Kenyeouth MacKenzie of Kintail that he should bring Marie MacLeod to her in Edinburgh. Another man, James McConeill, claimed her custody, but MacKenzie brought her to the queen. Marie joined the queen's household as a lady of her chamber.

On Christmas Eve 1562, Queen Mary bought clothes for Marie MacLeod, including black velvet for a riding hood and veil, and silk chamlet for a petticoat, bodice, and sleeves. In February 1563 she was a given a length of plaiding and a farthingale. In March 1565, Queen Mary ordered an outfit for Marie made of scarlet stemming for a cloak and a skirt front, known as a "devanter", possibly a riding costume. Marie and another young woman, Margaret Fame, were bought clothes made of black stemming as maidens in the queen's chamber and were provided with sheets and a mattress to sleep near the queen. Stemming was a woollen cloth.

== Lands of Trotternish ==
According to the lawyer and exchequer official John Skene, who made a note of crown lands in 1595, the Lords of Session transferred the lands of Trotternish, Uist, and Sleat from Marie Macleod to the crown. James V had granted these lands to her grandfather Alasdair Crotach MacLeod in November 1542.
