= Goddard Pemberton =

English landowner and Member of Parliament (1573–1616)

Sir Goddard Pemberton

Member of Parliament for Higham Ferrers
- In office 1604–1614
- Preceded by: Henry Montagu, 1st Earl of Manchester
- Succeeded by: Rowland St John

Personal details
- Died: 1 August 1616
- Cause of death: Illness
- Resting place: Rushden
- Spouse: Susannah
- Parents: Robert Pemberton (father); Margaret Throckmorton (mother)

Sir Goddard Pemberton (died 1 August 1616) was an English landowner and Member of Parliament.

Pemberton was the son of Robert Pemberton of Rushden and Margaret Throckmorton, the daughter of Richard Throckmorton of Higham Ferrers. His great-uncle was Sir George Throckmorton of Coughton Court.

Pemberton greatly benefited by his marriage and the political influence of Sir John Stanhope, the husband of his sister-in-law Margaret Macwilliam. His home was Hertingfordbury House, where he hosted King James and Anne of Denmark for a day in July 1605.

Pemberton was Member of Parliament for Higham Ferrers in 1604 and Sheriff of Hertfordshire in 1615.

Pemberton married Susannah, daughter of Henry Macwilliam and widow of Edward Saunders. Some sources say she was the daughter of Sir Thomas Cheek, her mother was Mary Cheke.

Pemberton died on 1 August 1616 of the "new ague or sickness", and was buried at Rushden. His widow married Thomas Ireland.
