= Charles Stanhope, 2nd Baron Stanhope =

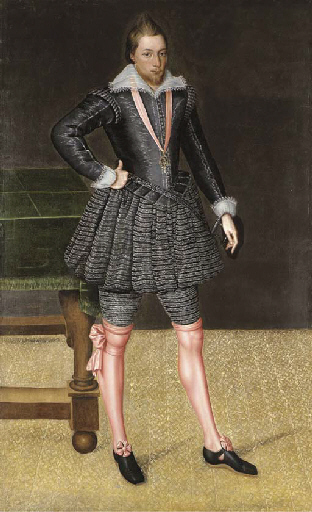
Sir Charles Stanhope by an artist in the circle of Robert Peake the Elder (Christie's)

Charles Stanhope, 2nd Baron Stanhope (1593–1675) was an English landowner, courtier, and writer of marginalia.

Stanhope was the son of Sir John Stanhope of Harrington, Northamptonshire and Margaret MacWilliam, daughter of Henry Macwilliam and Mary Hill. He attended Queens' College, Cambridge, and was knighted on 4 June 1610.

It was reported in June 1613 that, "My Lord Stanhope's son is lately fallen lunatic", but he seems to have made a recovery. He was Master of the Posts, an office that had belonged to his father, from 1625 to 1637. Margraret, Lady Stanhope died in 1640 at Stanhope House, in Charing Cross, London.

In 1641 Charles Stanhope married Dorothy or Doll Livingston, a sister of James Livingston, Earl of Newburgh, and a daughter of the Scottish courtier Sir John Livingston of Kinnaird, groom of the bedchamber, and Jane Sproxton (later Lady Gorges). However, some sources state his wife was Dorothy Barret.

== Marginalia ==
Stanhope is remembered for an anecdote about the fate of the wardrobe of Elizabeth I of England which he recorded in the margin of his copy of Cresacre More, The Life and Death of Sir Thomas More (1642), the book is now in the Folger Shakespeare Library. The marginalia asserts that George Home, 1st Earl of Dunbar, the new Scottish master of the wardrobe realised £60,000 from the sale of the late queen's clothes, and spent £20,0000 on the house he built at Berwick Castle. A similar story was recorded by Symonds D'Ewes on 21 January 1620, according to the antiquary Thomas Astle, that King James had given the late queen's wardrobe to the Earl of Dunbar, who had exported it to the Low Countries and sold it for £100,000. Stanhope's father, Sir John, had a connection with the wardrobe, having been tasked with making an inventory of royal apparel in 1604, and worked in Parliament to forward the Earl of Dunbar's business.

In his copy of Fulke Greville's Certaine Learned and Elegant Workes (1633), now in the Folger Library, Stanhope noted a rhyme about London pubs;

They pass by the Devil they make it no matter,
the Mitre, the Globe, the head in the platter,
the Fountain, the Mermaid too, these they go by all,
and how they will answer they balk at the Head Royal.

Three Catholic ladies were, "the College of Collapsed Ladies in Drury Lane, my Lady Garner, my Lady Markham, my Lady Easten". Further marginalia in the Life of Death of Sir Thomas More criticises his wife; she "spends you in two years £4,000 clear upon herself in paint perfumes", and "£320 a year for herself is enough if not too much for my Lady Dollkin". He characterises her servants in misogynistic terms as witches and spies.

== Lands and houses ==
Stanhope spent the Civil War abroad and after the Restoration bought Nocton Hall in Lincolnshire.

His niece Elizabeth Delaval (1649-1717) had an unhappy childhood in London and at Nocton with Dorothy Stanhope, relieved by amateur theatricals with the servants. Delaval, in her "meditations", blames Stanhope's servant Mistress Carter for leading her away from moral instruction. After two years at court as a maid of the privy chamber to Catherine of Braganza, Delaval returned to Nocton in 1664. Dorothy Stanhope was not a widow during this period, as some sources suggest. After her first husband Robert Delaval died in 1682, Elizabeth married Henry Hatcher, and in 1688 they joined the court of the exiled James II in France at Saint-Germain-en-Laye.

In 1654 Stanhope sold the manor of Stambourne and Stambourne Hall in Essex to Rachael, the widow of Sir John Cambell of Clay Hall, Barking.

Stanhope died in 1675 and was buried at Nocton. He had no children and left his estate at Nocton to a distant relation, Sir William Ellys, or his widow sold it to Justice Ellis for £18,000 in 1676.

Peerage of England
Preceded by John Stanhope	Baron Stanhope; 1621–1675	Extinct
