= Lord Stanhope =

Lord Stanhope may refer to

- Baron Stanhope of Harrington in the County of Northampton, was a title in the Peerage of England. It was created in 1605 and became extinct in 1675
- Earl Stanhope (pronounced "Stannup") was a title in the Peerage of Great Britain. It was created in 1718
