= Mary Cheke =

English courtier and poet (c.1532–1616)

Mary Cheke, Lady Cheke
- Born: Mary Hill c. 1532; Hampshire, England
- Died: 30 November 1616
- Occupations: courtier poet; epigrammatist
- Spouses: John Cheke (m. 1547; died 1557); Henry Macwilliam (m. 1558)
- Children: 3 with Cheeke; 8 with Mackwilliam
- Relatives: Sir John Mason (step-father)

Mary, Lady Cheke (née Hill; c. 1532 – 30 November 1616) was an English courtier, poet, and epigrammatist from Hampshire. She served as lady of the privy chamber to Elizabeth I and participated in literary exchanges at court, including a notable epigrammatic reply to Sir John Harrington. Cheke was married first to Sir John Cheke, a classical scholar and statesman, and later to Henry Macwilliam, while retaining the title of Lady Cheke. Her writings and courtly presence reflect both her literary activity and her life within the political and cultural circles of Tudor England.

== Biography ==
Born Mary Hill in Hampshire around 1532, her father was Richard Hill (d. 1539), of Hartley Wintney; he had served as Sergeant of the Wine Cellar to Henry VIII. After her father's death, her mother remarried Sir John Mason.

On 11 May 1547, she married Sir John Cheke of Mottistone Manor, an English classical scholar and statesman. They had at least three children: sons Henry, John, and Edward. After Mary Tudor became Queen in 1554, Mary Cheke's husband left England. From Calais, he requested John Harrington to look after his wife. John Cheke died in 1557. Late in 1558, Mary Cheke married Henry Macwilliam of Stambourne Hall, a gentleman pensioner, but retained the title of Lady Cheke.

She is remembered as an important attendant to Elizabeth I, and for a "witty poetic exchange" at her court. In the late 1590s, Harrington wrote an epigram with negative connotations regarding women in the Bible, and Cheke wrote back a lyrically-clever counter-epigram, "Erat quaedam mulier (a reply to John Harrington's poem, Erat quidem homo)".

Cheke died 30 November 1616.

== Selected works ==
- "Erat quaedam mulier (a reply to John Harrington's poem, Erat quidem homo)", late 1590s
