= William Grindal =

William Grindal (died 1548) was an English scholar. A dear friend, pupil and protégé of Roger Ascham's at St John's College, Cambridge, he became tutor to Lady Elizabeth, the future Queen Elizabeth I, and laid the foundations of her education in the Latin and Greek languages before dying prematurely of the plague in 1548.

== Origins, and study with Roger Ascham ==
Very little is known of William Grindal's origins. It is suggested he came from Cumberland, which was the origin of Edmund Grindal (Archbishop of Canterbury), born at St Bees in 1519, the son of a farmer named William Grindal, although the relationship between them, if any, has not been demonstrated. Both studied in the University of Cambridge during the 1530s and 1540s. A relationship may be suggested in a letter dated January 22, 1548 from Roger Ascham to Elizabeth, soon after William's death, in which he says "you must not hope, now that your own Grindal is dead, to get a better tutor in his place than is that other Grindal, who comes as near to him in sweetness and gentleness of manners as he does in name and in kindred." Possibly this "other Grindal" refers to Edmund, who was at that time M.A. and Fellow of Pembroke College, Cambridge, though there were other clergymen of that name.

William came as a poor scholar to St John's College: Roger Ascham wrote in his praise to Johannes Sturmius in January 1551, "He was my pupil in Cambridge, and from his youth he was grounded in Greek and Latin letters within the walls of my room for about seven years." William graduated B.A. in 1541/2, and was admitted to Fellowship at St John's on 14 March 1542/3. His friendship with Ascham was evidently very close: Ascham referred to him often as "my Grindal", "and if there were any other word in the whole language of friendship, of necessity, of dearness, of devotion, which might signify a closer and more binding conjunction than "my", I would most gladly apply it to the memory of my Grindal... He had such a conduct, intellect, memory and judgement as scarcely any man in England has attained whom I have ever seen."

Grindal was studying at the time when Ascham's teacher, John Cheke (of St John's College), and his friend Thomas Smith, both royal Exhibitioners, were introducing their revolution in the pronunciation of the ancient Greek, and was therefore one of the original students to benefit from the new life and understanding which they breathed into the study of the texts. Ascham had at first resisted the innovations, but soon followed the example of Smith's pupil John Poynet, and was converted. King Henry created Cheke his first Regius Professor of Greek at Cambridge in 1540.

It was in 1542 that Bishop Stephen Gardiner, as Vice-Chancellor of the University, issued a strict prohibition against their new methods, resulting in a copious private exchange of views with Cheke in which Gardiner became somewhat menacing. Over the next two years - the years of Grindal's Fellowship at St John's - Cheke, who was then also incorporated at the University of Oxford, was preparing for the King his translation into Latin (from Greek) of the De Apparatu Bellico of the Byzantine Emperor Leo VI, work which Ascham often talked over with his master. Ascham writes of "the great comoditie that we toke in hearyng hym [i.e., Cheke] reade privately in his chambre all Homer, Sophocles and Euripides, Herodotus, Thucydides, Xenophon, Isocrates and Plato." Grindal was immediately within the sphere of Cheke's teaching and influence.

== Royal teacher ==
In July 1544 John Cheke was summoned by the King to become preceptor to Prince Edward (to teach him "of toungues, of the scripture, of philosophie and all liberal sciences"), at first at Hampton Court, where he assisted or succeeded to Dr Richard Cox in that office. A few weeks later Ascham attempted to put Grindal forward for a Readership, with the approval of Dr William Bill and of Dr. John Madew, but shortly before this was settled a furore broke out in the college. Others, in Cheke's absence, attempted to defeat Ascham's proposal, objecting, as it seems, to his favouritism towards his pupil.

About 13 September 1544 Ascham wrote to Cheke, "I knew for certain that my friend Grindal, next to you and Smith, was second to none in Greek, and so poor that he had neither heart for study nor a sufficiency to live on, and that he was so attached to me that all our interests are in common. Could I then forgive his being separated from the learning in which he excelled, from the studies to which he was devoted, and from me his most familiar friend?" But as he was sealing his letter Bill and Madew came to inform him that Grindal was summoned to court to assist Cheke: Ascham wrote in postscript, "I commend him to you as a man of mark, and promise that you shall find him diligent and respectful, zealous in learning and love of you, silent, faithful, temperate, and honest, and in every way devoted and well fitted for your service."

Grindal was called by Cheke to instruct Lady Elizabeth in Greek letters. (At much the same time Giovanni Battista Castiglione was appointed her Italian tutor.) Ascham wrote to tell Grindal of the college upheavals, and in February wrote a longer letter of farewell, saying how his presence was missed: saying that he must write with discretion, and date his letters, to avoid any intrigue; he had read avidly Cheke's new translation from St John Chrysostom, with Grindal's prefatory Epistle; he urged Grindal to write often to Cheke, and to mention his name often to their master. Some time later Ascham also wrote to Elizabeth to compliment her on the excellent progress that she was making under the instruction of Lady Champernowne and William Grindal.

Katherine Champernowne, who married Sir John Astley in 1545, developed Elizabeth's knowledge of the French, Italian and Spanish languages. In both Greek and Latin, "the first foundations of these two languages were most felicitously laid by the hard work and diligence of Grindal... so that I might have doubted whether to admire more the wit of her that learned, or the diligence of him that taught," wrote Ascham to Sturmius long after Grindal's death of plague in January 1548. He compared the loss of his friend to the loss of his own parents. To Cheke he wrote, "It cannot be believed, most accomplished sir, to what a knowledge of the Latin and Greek tongues she will arrive, if she goes on as she has begun under Grindal."

== Death ==
Ascham wrote to Elizabeth on 22 January to condole with her over Grindal's death, and to place himself at her command in case she should not follow the guidance of Lord Admiral Seymour and Queen Katherine, who proposed to replace Grindal with Francis Goldsmith (sometime scholar of Christ's College and Fellow of Peterhouse), then a servant in the Queen's household. At that moment Seymour was attempting to manipulate John Cheke to influence the young king in his favour, and his flirtations with Elizabeth grew dangerous. Ascham was called to become her tutor in Grindal's place: he and Cheke maintained their positions after the fall of Seymour in January to March 1548/9, though Cheke had to defend his own innocency and withdrew temporarily from the court.

Elizabeth's fluency in Latin never deserted her, but was among the exceptional attributes of her royal authority, empowering her in all the formal business of the state. Her celebrated extempore harangue of a Polish ambassador in 1597, in which she poured out "a rolling flood of vituperative Latin, in which reproof, indignation, and sarcastic pleasantries followed one another with astonishing volubility", led her to conclude in English, smiling to her courtiers, "God's death, my lords! I have been enforced this day to scour up my old Latin which hath lain long rusting!" Rusty or not, the soundness of the structure was the work of Grindal and Ascham.
