= Henry Macwilliam =

16th-century English politician

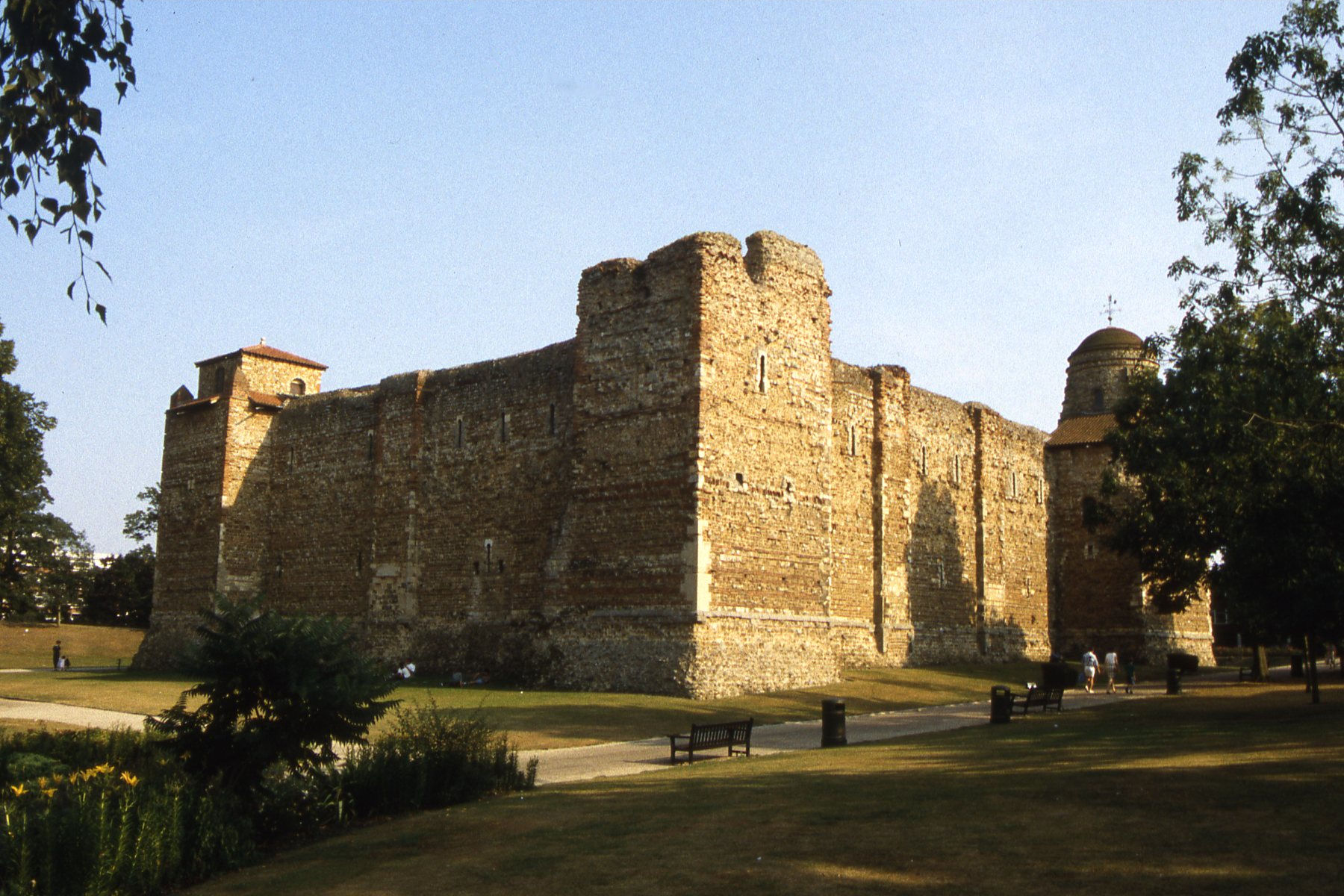
Colchester Castle, where Henry Macwilliam was its governor

Henry Macwilliam (c. 1532 – 1586) was a member of Parliament for Dorchester (1571), Liskeard (1572), Appleby (1584) and Carlisle (1586).

He was the son of Henry Macwilliam (died 1539) and his second wife Elizabeth Leyes, a daughter of Sir John Leyes. His sister Anne married Arthur Stourton.

His home was Stambourne Hall, Essex. He became Keeper of Colchester Castle.

He died on 27 December 1586.

== Marriage and children ==
He married Mary Cheke, daughter of Richard Hill, sergeant of the wine cellar to Henry VIII, and widow of John Cheke (died 1557), a lady of Elizabeth I's privy chamber. His children included:

- Henry Macwilliam, who was killed by Tom Compton in a duel in 1599.
- Margaret Macwilliam, married Sir John Stanhope (d. 1621)
- Susannah Macwilliam, married Edward Saunders or Sandys, (2) Goddard Pemberton, (3) Thomas Ireland.
- Ambrosia Macwilliam, who married William Kingsmill, mother of William Kingsmill (died 1618)
- Cassandra Macwilliam, who married George Cotton (died 1613), grandmother of the poet Charles Cotton
- Cicely Macwilliam, who married Thomas Ridgeway, 1st Earl of Londonderry, she was said to have been a maid of honour to Elizabeth I.
