= Henry Cheke =

16th-century English politician

Henry Cheke (c. 1548–1586), of Elstow, Bedfordshire; later of the Manor, York, was an English politician.

He was the eldest son of Sir John Cheke (tutor to King Edward VI) and his wife Mary, daughter of Richard Hill (and stepdaughter of Sir John Mason).

He was a Member (MP) of the Parliament of England for Bedford in 1571 and 1572 and for Boroughbridge in 1584.

He married twice, first to Frances Radclyffe (sister to Edward Radclyffe, 6th Earl of Sussex), by whom he had two sons and three daughters, and secondly to Frances daughter of Marmaduke Constable of York.

His son (Sir) Thomas Cheke was also a Member of Parliament and settled at Pyrgo in Essex.
