= John Stanhope, 1st Baron Stanhope =

16th-century English politician and peer

Arms of Stanhope: Quarterly ermine and gules

John Stanhope, 1st Baron Stanhope (1545 – 9 March 1621) was an English courtier, politician and peer. He was made Vice-Chamberlain of the Household by Elizabeth I, Privy Councillor, and a member of the Council of the North. He was a close associate of Sir William Cecil and Sir Robert Cecil at court.

== Life ==
He was the third son of Sir Michael Stanhope, born in Yorkshire, but brought up in Nottinghamshire after his father's attainder for treason in 1552. His father's end did not apparently hinder his own career, and he is probably the John Stanhope who was Member of Parliament (MP) for Marlborough in the Parliament of 1572–1581, for Truro in 1586 and for Rochester in 1588.

His aunt was Anne Stanhope, Duchess of Somerset, while his grandmother, Beatrice Cooke, was a cousin of Mildred Cooke, wife of the chief minister of Elizabeth I, William Cecil, 1st Baron Burghley. Through the patronage of the Cecils, Stanhope would rise at court.

At court, Stanhope was a Gentleman of the Queen's Privy Chamber. His uncle, Thomas Reston or Rawson, served as a trumpeter in ordinary at court. On 22 December 1589, Stanhope wrote from Richmond Palace to Lord Talbot, describing Queen Elizabeth's good health; "the Queen is so well as I assure you 6 or 7 galliards in a morning, besides music & singing, is her ordinary exercise."

At some point during his early career, Stanhope attached himself to the coat-tails of Sir Robert Cecil and subsequently proved a reliable ally, receiving in return a series of appointments. He was Custos Rotulorum of the North Riding and Vice-Admiral of Yorkshire for many years and a member of the Council of the North. In 1590, he was appointed Master of the King's Posts; and in 1596, he was knighted and appointed as Treasurer of the Chamber.

In 1597, Stanhope stood for election to Parliament as Member for Yorkshire, presumably assuming that with his own standing and Cecil's backing he would be certain of success, but they had not reckoned with the independence of the large electorate - Stanhope spent most of his time at court and no longer lived in Yorkshire, and despite his local roots, they may have considered him an outsider. According to Stanhope's supporters, his principal opponent, Sir John Savile, was backed by only "eight other gentlemen of any reckoning, but with a great number of clothiers and artificers"; but he was local and strongly connected with the clothing industry that provided many of the voters with their livelihood. Stanhope was defeated in a tumultuous election. After the Archbishop of York and other members of the Council of the North reported to the Privy Council that Savile had shown contempt for their authority, the council had him arrested, but they could not overturn the election result and were forced to release him in time to take his seat.

Meanwhile, Stanhope was hastily found a seat instead for Preston, a borough Cecil had in his gift as Chancellor of the Duchy of Lancaster. He later sat for Northamptonshire in the Parliament of 1601 and for Newtown from 1604 until, on 2 May 1605, he was raised to the peerage as Baron Stanhope, of Harrington.

As one of Cecil's leading followers, it was rumoured in 1600 that Stanhope would soon become Lord Chancellor. Instead, he was provided for by being appointed Vice-Chamberlain of the Household. In 1603 he was appointed one of the "Commissioners to treat of a Union between England and Scotland", to settle the arrangements for the inheritance of the English throne by the king of Scotland, James VI; and in 1609, he became a member of the council of the Virginia Company.

He resigned the Treasurership of the Chamber and retired from his other posts in 1616 and died in 1621. He was succeeded in his peerage (and as Master of the King's Posts) by his son, Charles Stanhope, 2nd Baron Stanhope, who married a sister of James Livingston, 1st Earl of Newburgh.

== Family ==
Stanhope was twice married: first to Joan, daughter of William Knollys, by whom he had no issue; and second, on 6 May 1589, to Margaret, daughter of Henry Macwilliam, one of the queen's gentlemen pensioners. His brother-in-law was Thomas Ridgeway, 1st Earl of Londonderry. By his wife he had issue:

- Charles, born in 1593, who succeeded as second baron but died without issue in 1675, when the title became extinct;
- Elizabeth, who married Sir Lionel Tollemache, 2nd Baronet; and
- Catherine, who married Robert Cholmondeley, Earl of Leinster.

Margaret died in 1640 and was buried alongside her husband at St. Martin's-in-the-Fields.

The later peers of the Stanhope family descend from the first baron's brother, Thomas.

== Notes ==
Attribution This article incorporates text from a publication now in the public domain: "Stanhope, John". Dictionary of National Biography. London: Smith, Elder & Co. 1885–1900.

Parliament of England
Preceded by William Brooke; William Lewin	Member of Parliament for Rochester; 1588–1589; With: William Lewin	Succeeded by William Lewin; George Chowne
Preceded by Robert Wroth; Rober Cotton	Member of Parliament for Newtown, IoW; 1604–1605; With: William Meux	Succeeded by Thomas Wilson; William Meux
Political offices
Preceded by Sir Francis Knollys	Vice-Chamberlain of the Household; 1602–1616	Succeeded by Sir John Digby
Preceded by Thomas Randolph	Master of the Queen's Posts; 1590–1621	Succeeded by Charles Stanhope
Honorary titles
Preceded by Sir Henry Gates	Custos Rotulorum of the North Riding of Yorkshire; 1589–1621	Succeeded by Sir Thomas Posthumous Hoby
Peerage of England
New creation	Baron Stanhope; 1605–1621	Succeeded by Charles Stanhope
