= Baron Stanhope =

Extinct barony in the Peerage of England

Baron Stanhope, of Harrington in the County of Northampton, was a title in the Peerage of England. It was created on 2 May 1605 for Sir John Stanhope, who served as Vice-Chamberlain of the Household between 1602 and 1616. He was the son of Sir Michael Stanhope and the brother of Sir Thomas Stanhope, ancestor of the Earls of Chesterfield, the Earls of Harrington and the Earls Stanhope.

Lord Stanhope was succeeded by his son, Charles, the second Baron, both of whom had been Master of the King's Posts. The title became extinct on his death in 1675.

== Barons Stanhope, of Harrington (1605) ==
- John Stanhope, 1st Baron Stanhope (d. 1621)
- Charles Stanhope, 2nd Baron Stanhope (1595–1675)

== Barons Stanhope, of Shelford ==
- See Earl of Chesterfield

== Barons Stanhope, of Elvaston ==
- See Earl Stanhope

== See also ==
- Earl of Harrington
- Baron Weardale
