= William Meux =

English Member of Parliament

William Meux or Mewes (c. 1530-1589), of Kingston, Isle of Wight, was an English Member of Parliament (MP).

He was a Member of the Parliament of England for Newtown, Isle of Wight in 1584.

Parliament of England
Preceded by ? ?	Member of Parliament for Newtown (Isle of Wight); 1584; With: Robert Rudge	Succeeded by Richard Huyshe; Richard Dillington
