= Stambourne =

Village in Essex, England

Coordinates: 52.020°N 0.510°E

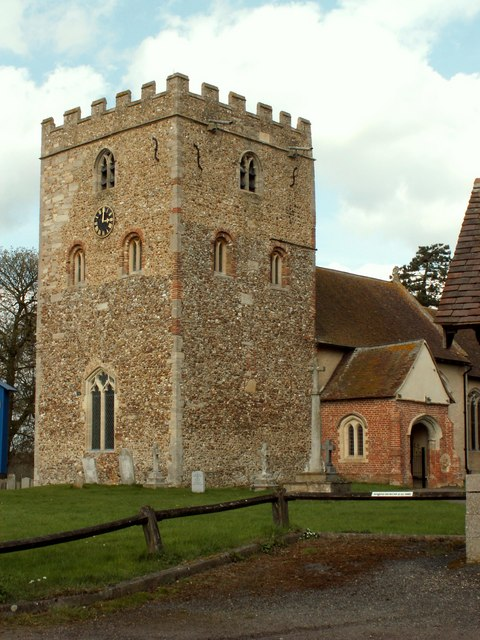
- Parish church of St Peter and St Thomas Becket

- Location within Essex
- Population: 421 (Parish, 2021)
- Civil parish: Stambourne
- District: Braintree
- Shire county: Essex
- Region: East
- Country: England
- Sovereign state: United Kingdom
- Post town: HALSTEAD
- Postcode district: CO9

Stambourne is a village and civil parish in the Braintree District in north Essex, England. It lies 8 miles (13 km) north-west of Halstead, its post town. Stambourne's closest neighbouring villages are Ridgewell, Toppesfield, Cornish Hall End and Great Yeldham. At the 2021 census the parish had a population of 421.

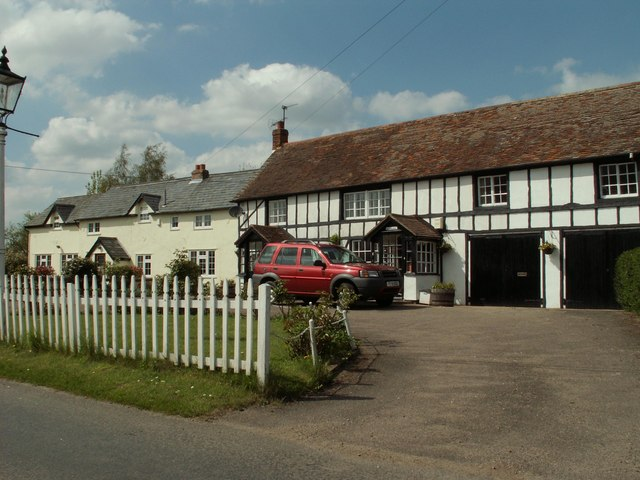
Cottages at Stambourne

== History ==
The name Stambourne derives from the Old English term for 'stony brook'.

A part of the British 17th-century witchcraft trials, the spinster Sarah Houghton of Stambourne, in 1663, was charged by the authorities with causing John Smyth to become "consumed and made infirme." A jury, including John Levett and Matthew Butcher, found Houghton guilty, and she was ordered to be hanged. She was reprieved after the jury had rendered their judgment.

Dame Gwen Ffrangcon-Davies, a stage actress of the early- and mid-20th century, lived in Stambourne in later life, dying in 1992 at the age of 101.

== Community ==
The parish church of St Peter and St Thomas Becket dates from the 11th century and is a Grade I listed building.

Every year a bonfire and fireworks display is held in the village playing field. The event attracts people from surrounding areas (including Great Yeldham, Hedingham and Halstead).

== See also ==
- Stambourne Hall
