= John Cheke =

English classical scholar and statesman (1514–1557)

Sir John Cheke
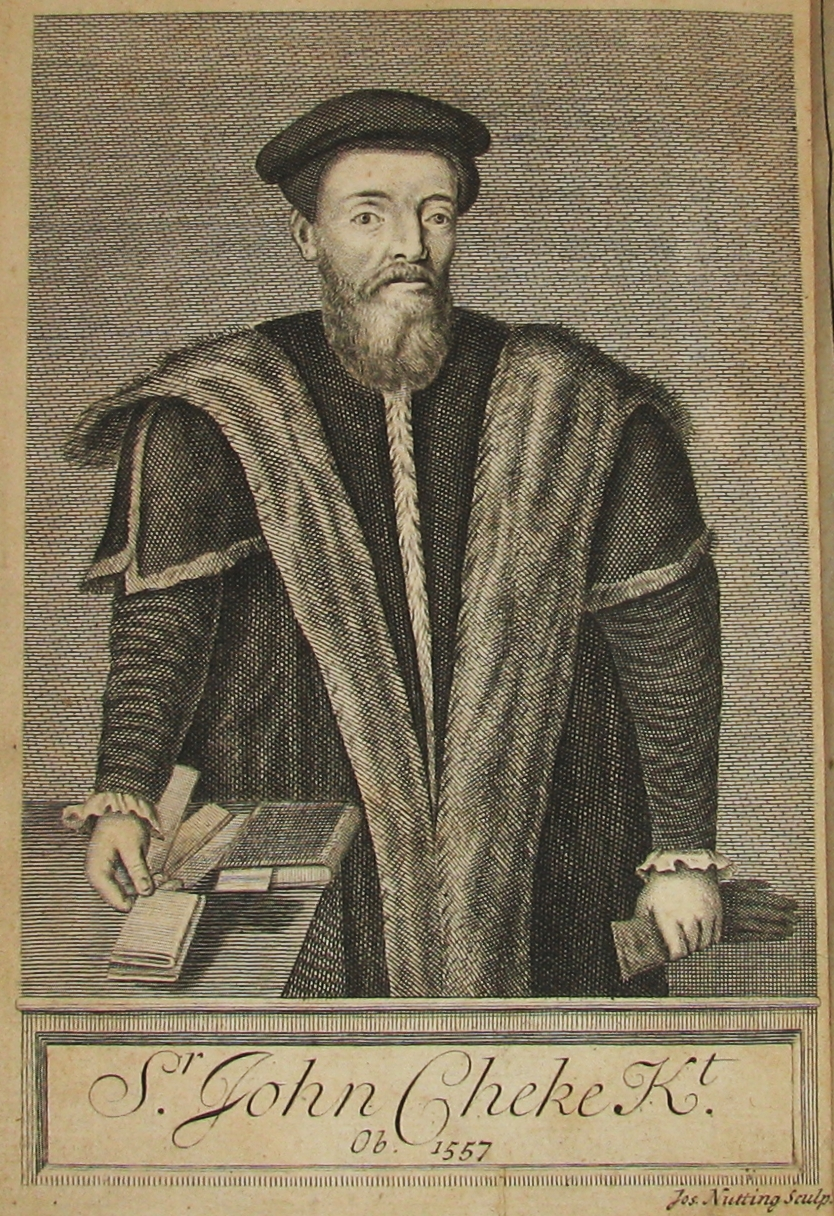
- Portrait from the biography The Life of the Learned Sir John Cheke, Kt (1705) by John Strype

Regius Professor of Greek (Cambridge)
- In office 1540–1547
- Appointed by: Henry VIII
- Monarch: Henry VIII
- Preceded by: Post established
- Succeeded by: Nicholas Carr

Personal details
- Born: 16 June 1514 Cambridge, England
- Died: 13 September 1557 (aged 43) London, England
- Spouse: Mary Cheke (m. 1547)
- Relations: Thomas Cheek (grandson; via Henry); Robert Rich, 1st Earl of Warwick (co-father-in-law; via Thomas)
- Children: Henry Cheke; John Cheke; Edward Cheke
- Parent(s): Agnes Duffield (mother); Peter Cheke (father)

Sir John Cheke (or Cheek; 16 June 1514 – 13 September 1557) was an English classical scholar and statesman. One of the foremost teachers of his age, and the first Regius Professor of Greek at the University of Cambridge, he played a great part in the revival of Greek learning in England. He was tutor to Prince Edward, the future King Edward VI, and also sometimes to Princess Elizabeth. Of strongly Reformist sympathy in religious affairs, his public career as provost of King's College, Cambridge, Member of Parliament and briefly as Secretary of State during King Edward's reign was brought to a close by the accession of Queen Mary in 1553. He went into voluntary exile abroad, at first under royal licence (which he overstayed). He was captured and imprisoned in 1556, and recanted his faith to avoid death by burning. He died not long afterward, reportedly regretting his decision.

== Origins and earlier career ==
The Cheke or Cheeke family is said to have originated in Northamptonshire and to be descended from Sir William de Butevillar. At the time of John's birth, the family seat had been, for more than a century, at Mottistone in the Isle of Wight.

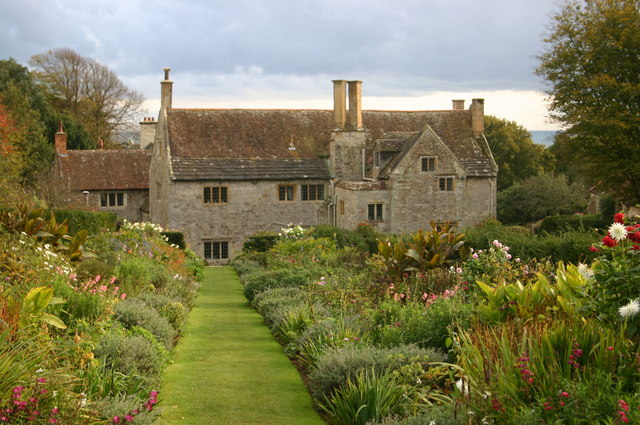
Mottistone Manor, the Cheke family seat on the Isle of Wight

John's father, Peter Cheke of Cambridge (the son of Robert Cheke of Mottistone), was Esquire Bedell of the University of Cambridge from 1509 until his death in 1529. John's mother was Agnes Duffield, daughter of Andrew Duffield of Cambridge: John was born in that city in 1514, and had five sisters, Ann, Alice, Elizabeth, Magdalen, and Mary. His grammatical education was begun by John Morgan, M.A. He was educated at St John's College, where he proceeded to receive a B.A. in 1529, and obtained a Fellowship. He commenced with an M.A. in 1533. His tutor was George Day, who became an opponent of the Edwardian Reformation.

At university, Cheke, and his friend, Thomas Smith (a student of Civil Law at Queens' College), were thought so outstanding that each was granted an exhibition by King Henry to support them in their studies. Both were largely impressed by the classical learning of John Redman, who had studied in Paris, and sought to emulate him. Both Queens' College (where the influence of Erasmus remained) and St John's fostered Reformist principles which Cheke and Smith embraced.

During the early 1530s Cheke and Smith studied together privately to import English phonological conventions onto ancient Greek letters. The language itself, its cadences and inflexions of meaning, thereby gained new life in the English-speaking world and the works of the ancient scholars and orators were made more familiar to English speakers. Smith, giving Greek lectures from 1533, around 1535 began to make public trial of these effects, and soon gained a following. Smith's student John Poynet, succeeding his tutor, maintained the new pronunciation in his lectures: both Cheke and Smith began to coach students in their method, and the Plutus of Aristophanes was acted at St. John's in the new manner. After Poynet as Greek Reader came Roger Ascham, Cheke's student, who read Isocrates, at first disputing but afterwards coming round fully to the innovations, which also won the approval of John Redman.

=== Academic manoeuvres ===
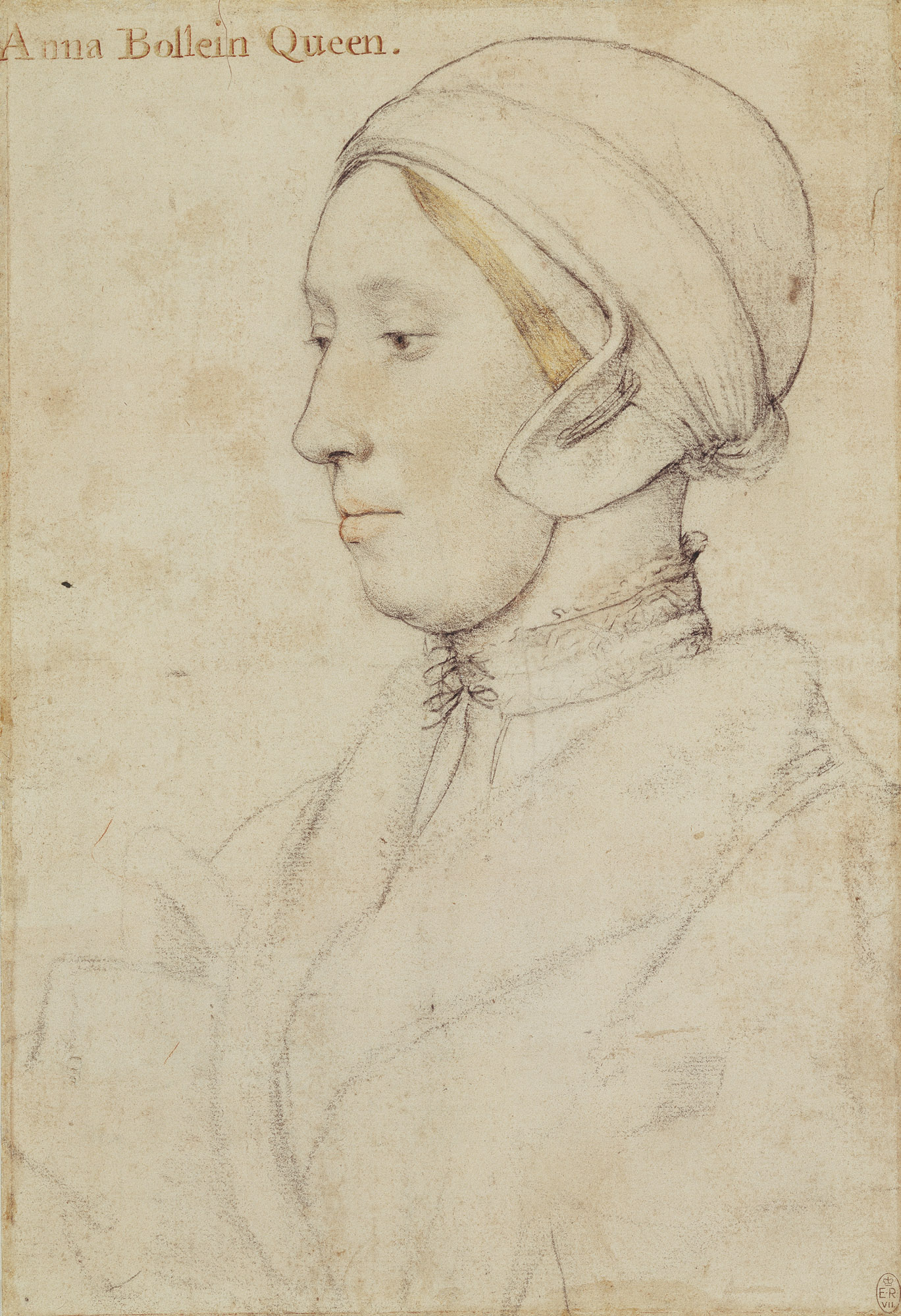
John Cheke inscribed the names on a famous series of portraits by Hans Holbein the Younger.

Through the mediation of Matthew Parker, Cheke obtained the support of Anne Boleyn for his student William Bill to continue his studies. After a year as Master of St John's, and as University Vice-Chancellor, George Day was appointed by King Henry to be provost of King's College in 1538, Smith having become University Orator in 1537 in succession to him. In 1540, at the King's creation of the Regius Professorships, Smith was made Professor of Law, Cheke Professor of Greek, and John Blythe (of King's College) Professor of Physick. Blythe married Alice, one of Cheke's sisters, before 1536, and in 1541 William Cecil (afterwards Lord Burleigh), Cheke's distinguished student, married Mary Cheke, another. (Mary Cecil died two years later, leaving Cecil with a son, Thomas Cecil.) In 1542 one "Mistress Cheke" was still resident in the Cheke home at Market Hill, Cambridge.

In June 1542, Bishop Gardiner, as chancellor of the university, issued his Edict to all who recognized his authority that the sounds customarily used for the pronunciation of Greek or Latin should not be changed by anyone, and gave a list of them with phonetic explanations. He pronounced severe and potentially exclusionist penalties at all levels of the academic hierarchy for those who contravened this ruling, and further wrote to the vice-chancellor requiring that his edict be observed. Cheke, as one of the principal targets of Gardiner's disapproval, entered into a correspondence of seven letters with him, but the Bishop remained inflexible. However the seeds of his method had been sown, and took root. At that time the letters remained unpublished.

In that year Cheke was incorporated M.A. at the University of Oxford, being made a canon of King Henry VIII's College. In 1544 he succeeded Smith as Public Orator in the University of Cambridge. Day, consecrated Bishop of Chichester in 1543, remained provost of King's. At this time Cheke prepared his Latin translation (dedicated to the King) of the De Apparatu Bellico of the Byzantine Emperor Leo VI, often sharing and talking over his work with Roger Ascham. Thomas Hoby was then one of his pupils. Cheke's reading and thought in the Greek Histories, and his use of them to extract examples of policy and conduct, can be studied in his annotations to print copies (from the Aldine Press) of Herodotus and Thucydides.

In 1543 and 1545, his Latin versions of the homilies of St John Chrysostom were published, opening with a letter of dedication to his patron the King. On 10 June 1544 Cheke was appointed tutor to the future King Edward VI, as a supplement to his tutor Dr Richard Cox, to teach him "of toungues, of the scripture, of philosophie and all liberal sciences" (as the Prince wrote in his Journal), and commenced his duties at Hampton Court soon afterwards. At the Prince's invitation, the young Henry Hastings shared in his studies. Roger Ascham felt strongly Cheke's absence from the university, where his example was so inspirational. Special interest has been found in Cheke's lengthy preface to his Latin translation of Plutarch's De Superstitione, prepared as a New Year's gift for the King in 1545 or 1546.

Edward's tutor in French, the Huguenot Jean Belmain, was Cheke's nephew by marriage. Ascham's pupil William Grindal was, at his recommendation to Cheke, chosen to read Greek to Princess Elizabeth, until his untimely death in 1548. By that time William Bill was Master of St John's, and John Redman Master of the newly-founded Trinity College (1546), in which Bill succeeded him in 1551.

On 11 May 1547, Cheke married Mary, daughter of Richard Hill (formerly Sergeant of the Wine-cellar to Henry VIII) and now stepdaughter of Sir John Mason. Cheke's religious and scholarly purpose bore fruit in the highest quarters. Gerard Langbaine the elder expressed it thus:

"under God M. Cheek was a speciall instrument of the propagation of the Gospell, & that Religion which we now professe in this Kingdome. For he not only sowed the seeds of that Doctrine in the heart of Prince EDWARD, which afterwards grew up into a generall Reformation when he came to be King, but by his meanes the same saveing truth was gently instilled into the Lady ELIZABETH, by those who by his procurement were admitted to be the Guides of her younger Studies."

== Edwardian statesman ==
=== Status and compromise ===
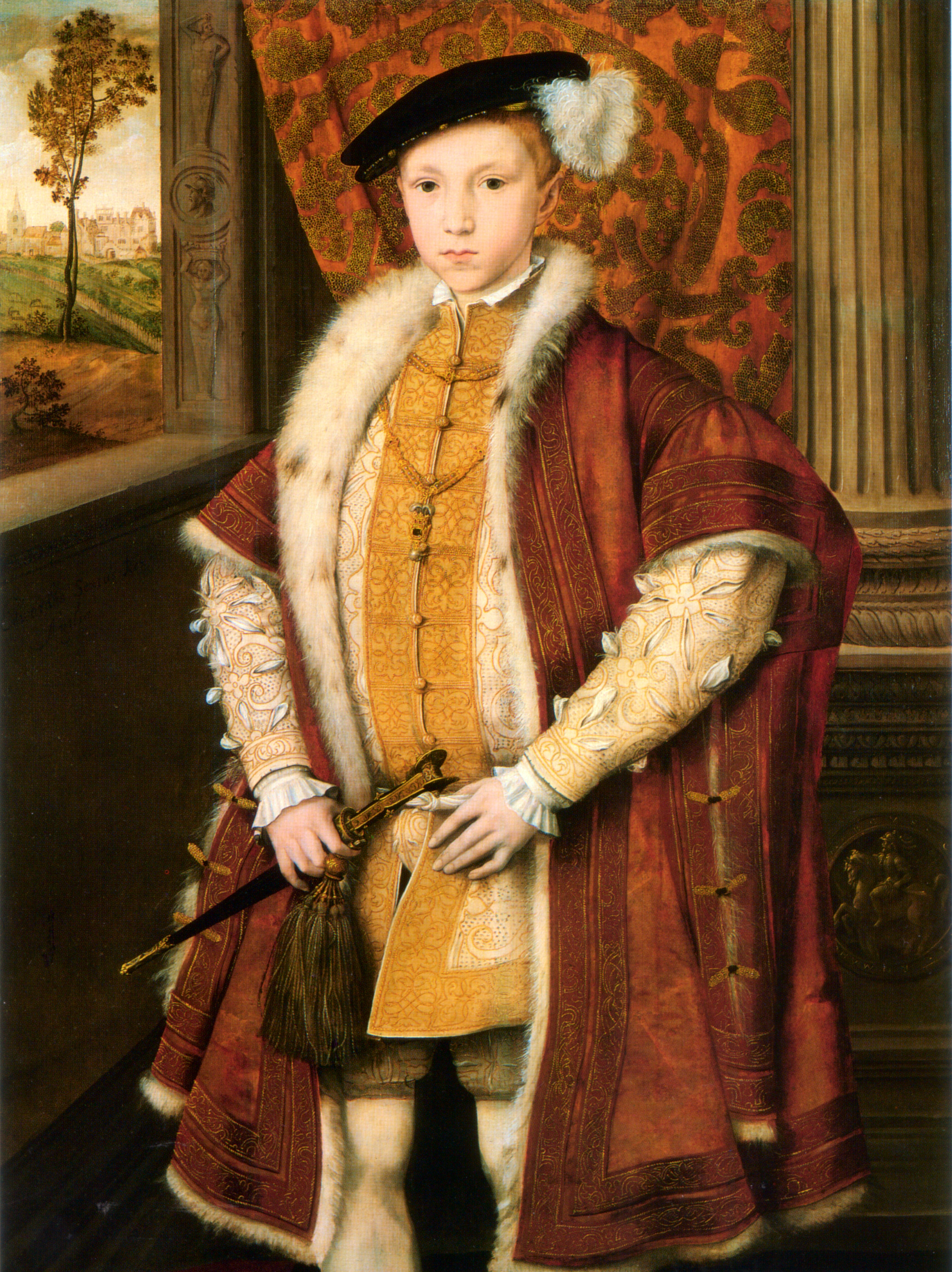
King Edward VI by William Scrots, Royal Collection, Windsor

Upon the accession of Edward to the throne Cheke, now Schoolmaster to the King, was made a Gentleman of the Privy Chamber, being allowed an annuity of £100 from the Augmentations in August. On 1 October, he was returned to Parliament as a member for Bletchingley, Sussex, probably under the patronage of Sir Thomas Cawarden. He was very soon placed in a compromise by Thomas Seymour (brother of the Duke of Somerset), who had drafted a letter as from the King to the Lords of the Parliament House seeking their approval to separate the offices of Lord Protector and Lord Regent, and to appoint Thomas Seymour himself as Protector. He urged Cheke to pass the letter to the King and to induce him to sign it, which Cheke refused to do, stating that Lord Paget had prohibited any such dealings. At Christmas, Seymour followed this up with a gift of £40 to Cheke, half for himself and half for the King. Seymour approached the King himself without success: Edward took Cheke's advice, and refused to sign it.

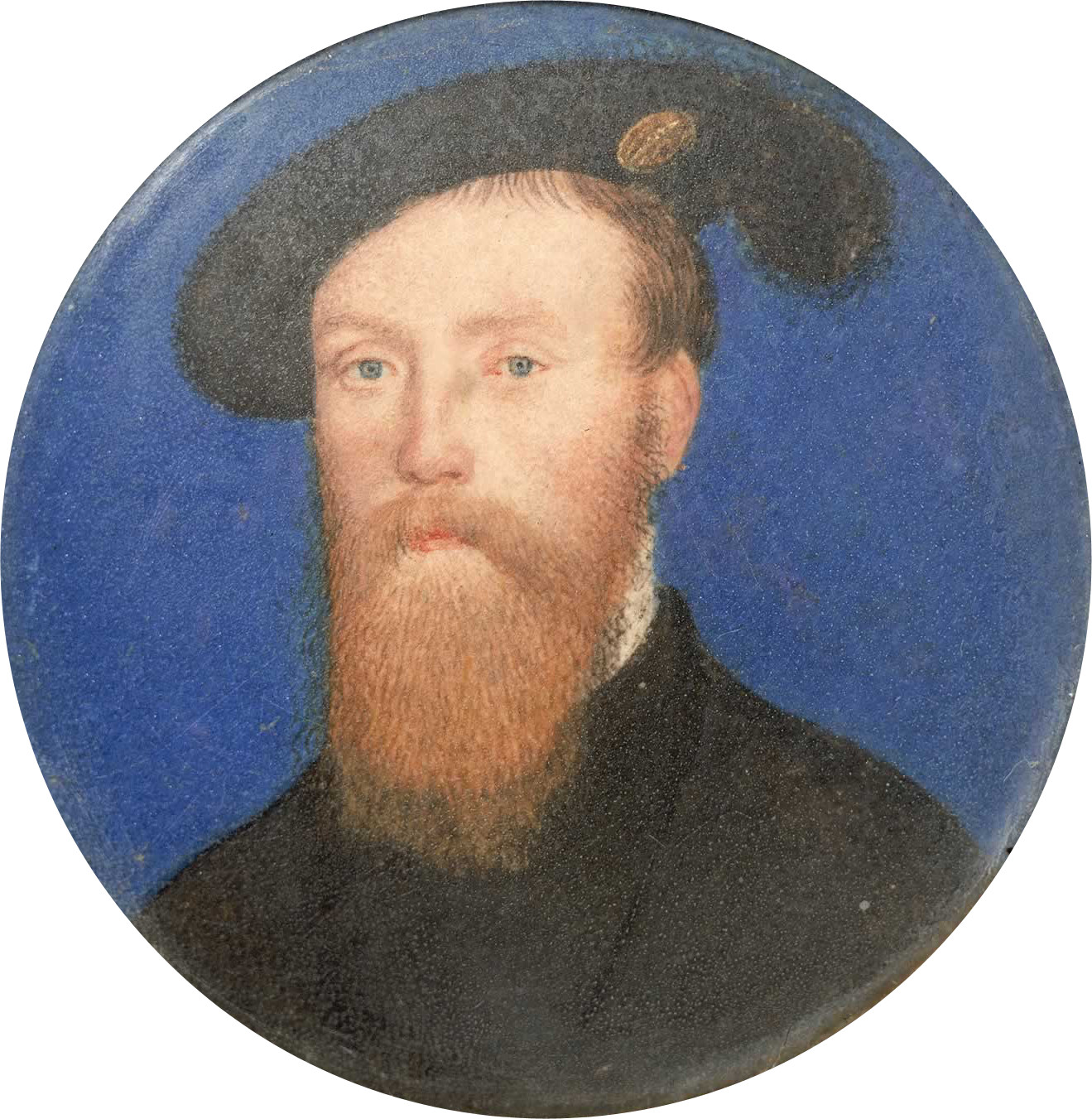
Thomas Seymour

On 1 April 1548 Cheke was chosen by special mandate of the King, overriding university statutes, to replace his former tutor George Day as provost of King's College. He received by purchase a large grant of lands in London and elsewhere, including the site of the former College of St John the Baptist at Stoke-by-Clare in Suffolk, in October 1548. Matthew Parker, its dean, had established a school there, and after its superstitious constitution had been dissolved he advised Cheke on its condition and maintenance.

The Seymour affair came to a head in January 1548/9, when Thomas Seymour was formally charged with using improper means to influence King Edward, and Cheke became implicated as his likely accomplice. On 11 January Cheke came near to losing his office as schoolmaster to the King. Seymour confessed the gift, but on 20 February Cheke exonerated himself by an honest declaration of his dealings in the matter. Unfortunately, Mistress Cheke offended the Duchess of Somerset in the course of these proceedings; an apology had to be made. Following Seymour's execution in March Cheke retreated to Cambridge for a time, tending his library and readjusting his circumstances, aware that he had come near to losing his position (as his letter to Peter Osborne indicates). Other royal preceptors, Sir Anthony Cooke or Dr. Cox, maintained the young King's instruction.

In the Epistle to his Arte of Logique (published 1551), Thomas Wilson speaks of Cheke and Cooke as "your Maiesties teachers and Scholemaisters in all good litterature".

The antiquary Francis Blomefield dates to 1550 Cheke's receipt of a 21-year lease of the manor and rectory of Rushworth, Norfolk (a former collegiate estate established by the Gonville family), which he re-leased to his brother-in-law, George Alyngton, of Stoke-by-Clare.

=== Religious reform: friends and rewards ===
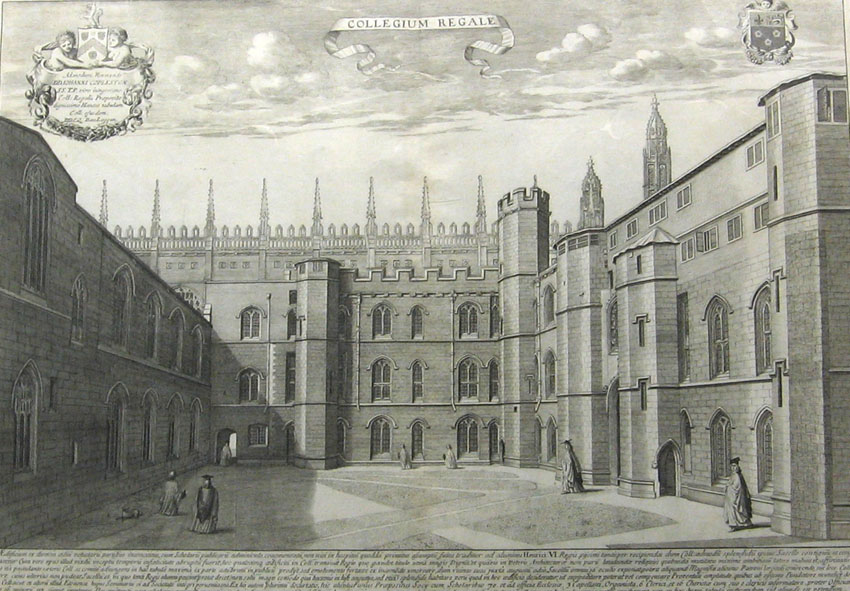
Part of King's College as it appeared in 1690.

In discharge of their Commission, in May–July 1549 the Bishops Goodrich of Ely and Ridley of Rochester, Sir William Paget and Sir Thomas Smith, John Cheke and two others conducted the King's Visitation of the University of Cambridge to investigate and amend statutes tending towards ignorance and Romish superstition. William Bill was now Master of St John's and vice-chancellor. On 6 May Cheke delivered the King's statute before the University Senate. Colleges were visited, complaints were heard, investigated and acted upon; two disputations (20 and 25 June) were held in the Philosophy Schools upon the question of the Real Presence in the Sacrament. Their business concluded, the congress broke up on 8 July.

In that year Cheke published his lasting work The Hurt of Sedition, in the aftermath of the suppression of Kett's rebellion. This made plain his full commitment to the Edwardian reform and its authority. He was chosen one of 8 divines, among 32 Commissioners, to draw up a reform of laws for the governance of the Church. The Latin form of their report, which Cheke prepared with Walter Haddon, remained long unpublished. He returned to London, giving evidence at the examination of Bishop Bonner in September 1549, and sitting in the Parliamentary third session, towards the close of which he was granted property in Lincolnshire and Suffolk worth £118 a year for his care in the King's instruction. In April 1550, following Somerset's fall, Cheke was given licence to keep 50 retainers. In May he acquired the manor and town of Dunton Wayletts in Essex, and the manors of Preston and Hoo in Sussex, from John Poynet. He obtained for Roger Ascham the role of secretary to Sir Richard Morison's Embassy to Emperor Charles V.

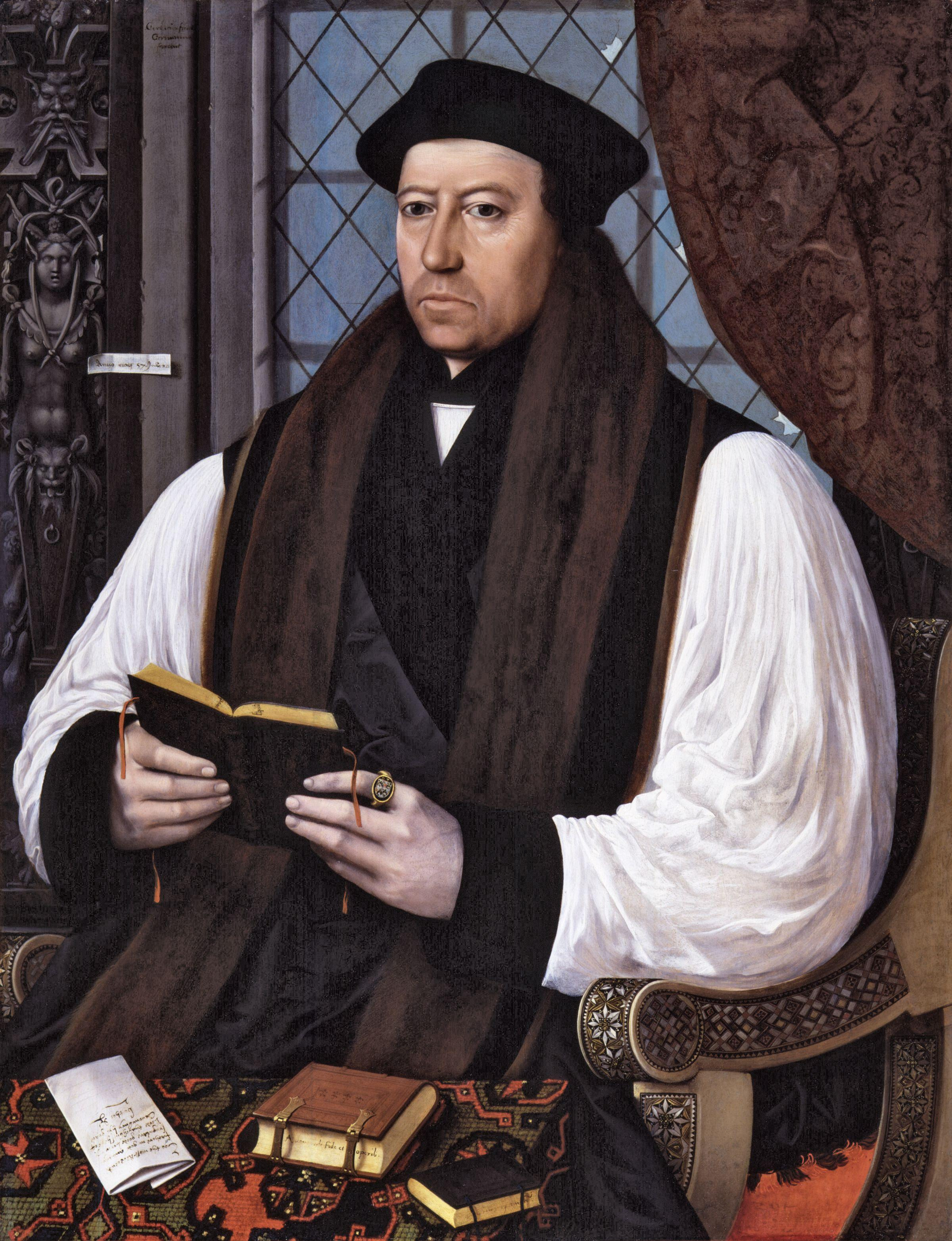
Archbishop Cranmer

Archbishop Cranmer reputedly told Cheke that he might be glad all the days of his life to have such a scholar as the Prince, "for he hathe more divinitie in his litle fynger, then all we have in al our bodies." Cheke meanwhile prepared a Latin version of the first Book of Common Prayer, the form in which Peter Martyr read it when consulted over its review by Cranmer. Peter Martyr doubted if the bishops would approve it, but Cheke foreknew the King's determination to implement it. In October 1550 his friend Martin Bucer, Cambridge Regius Professor of Divinity (who was indebted to Cheke for some favour offered by the King towards his countryman Johann Sleidan), presented him with the draft manuscript of his De Regno Christi (which remained unpublished until 1557).

With Sir Thomas Smith, William Cecil, Sir Anthony Wingfield, Sir Thomas Wroth and Sir Ralph Sadler, Cheke gave evidence at the interrogation and deprivation of Stephen Gardiner in January 1551. At that time he was appointed to a weighty Commission to inquire into, amend and punish heresies, renewed in the following year. Martin Bucer died in February. In May 1551 Cheke's annuity was cancelled, and in its place he received an enhanced grant of Stoke-by-Clare with its former lands and dependencies in Suffolk, Essex, Norfolk, Lincolnshire, Huntingdon, etc, with other properties, worth £192 per annum, for his industry in teaching the King. He was serving as commissioner for relief in Cambridgeshire, and, having conducted a Visitation of Eton in September, he and his brother-in-law Cecil (now a Secretary of State and chancellor of the Order of the Garter) on 11 October received knighthoods, the day upon which the Earl of Warwick was created Duke of Northumberland, and others of the nobility were advanced.

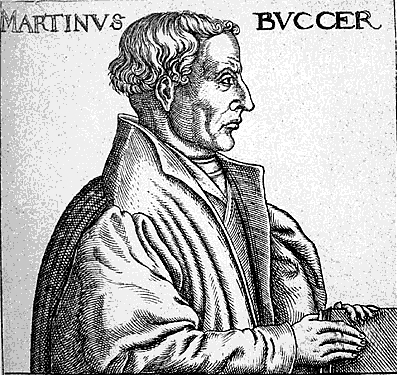
Martin Bucer

Shortly thereafter Cheke took part in two important private disputations upon the Real Presence, one at Cecil's house and the second at Sir Richard Morison's, held as a preparation for the review of the Prayer Book to be conducted in 1552. Among the auditors were Sir Thomas Wroth, Sir Anthony Cooke, Lord Russell and Sir Nicholas Throckmorton, and the debate lay between Cheke, Cecil, Edmund Grindal and others, against the presence, and John Feckenham, Dr Yong and others upholding it. The matter of the debates was printed by John Strype. The commission for examination of ecclesiastical laws, as required by Act of Parliament, was issued on 12 February. At this time Cheke, who had the books and papers of Martin Bucer, was attempting to build up the royal Library, and at the death of his friend and admirer John Leland, the antiquary, in April 1552 acquired his materials for the same purpose.

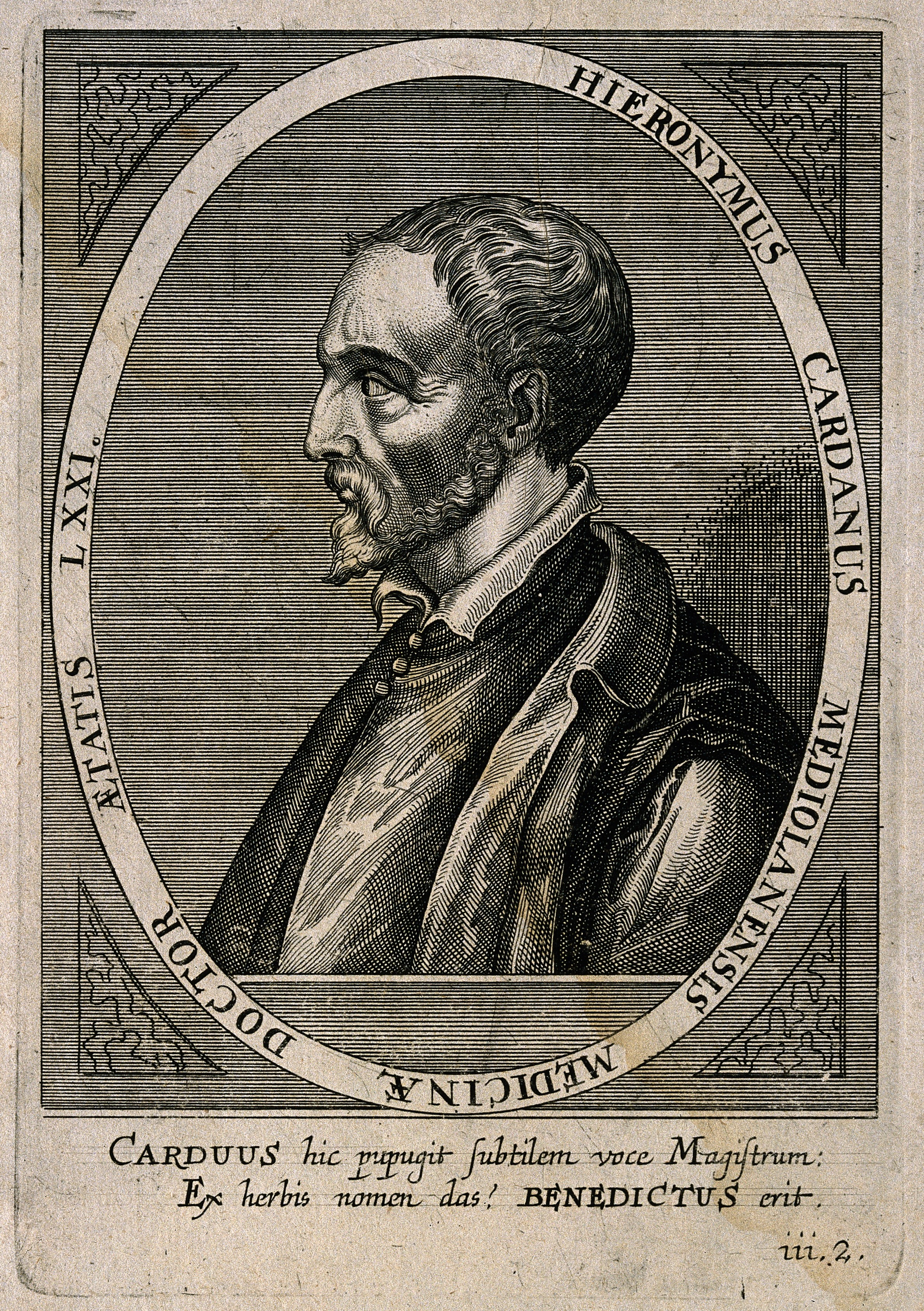
Girolamo Cardano

Having suffered a severe inflammation of the lungs in May 1552, he held a further disputation in Cambridge upon the doctrine of the Harrowing of Hell, with Christopher Carlile, before joining a royal progress. In July 1552, he was granted a special licence to shoot at certain fowl and deer with crossbow or hand-gun; in August he was created Chamberlain of the Receipt of the King's Exchequer, in the place of Anthony Wingfield, deceased, with a lifetime authority to appoint its officers (he entered office on 12 September 1552), and was also awarded the wardship and marriage of the heir of Sir Thomas Barnardiston.

In mid-September he received from Archbishop Cranmer the Forty-two Articles prepared for the revision of the Prayer-Book with the instruction to discuss them with Cecil and to set them in order. Being approved by the Convocation they were published in 1553: in the same period Cheke had apparently prepared the Latin translation of Cranmer's Defence of the True and Catholic Doctrine of the Sacrament of 1550, and this too was published in 1553.

During 1552, he was visited in London by Girolamo Cardano, who lodged with him. Cheke was, like others of his time, somewhat given to judicial astrology. John Dee claimed that Cheke had declared his 'good liking' of him to William Cecil.

At least two horoscopes of Cheke's birth exist, one by Sir Thomas White and one by Cardano. Cardano's observations on Cheke were published in his De Genituris Liber.

Cheke gave him some exact dates concerning events in his life, and Cardano described him as a slender, manly figure with fine skin of good colour, well-set and sharp eyes, of noble bearing, handsome and hirsute.

=== Apotheosis ===
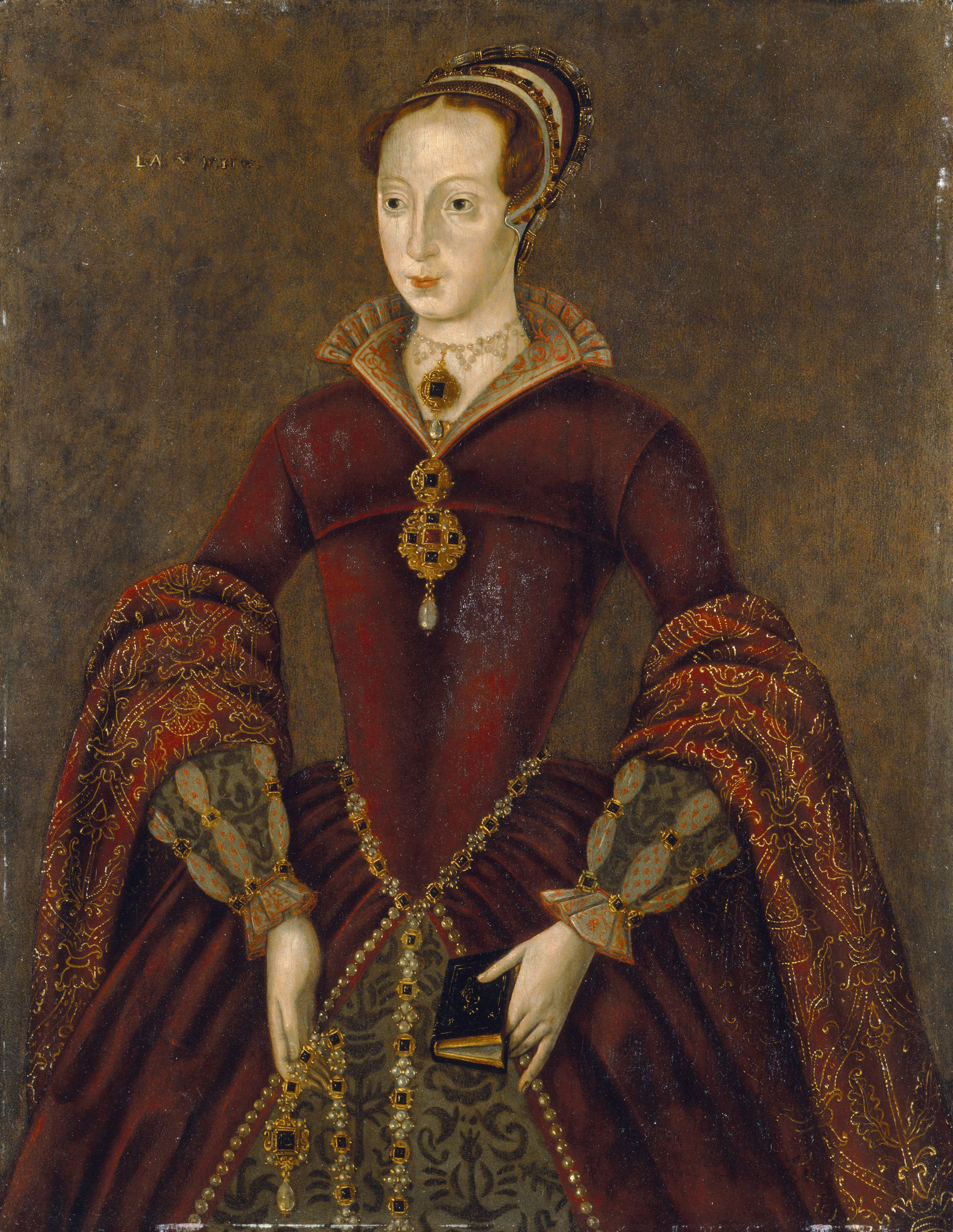
Lady Jane Grey (the Streatham Portrait)

Cheke was returned again for the Parliament of March 1553, and was at about that time a clerk of the Privy Council. In May 1553 he was further rewarded for his services to the King's education both in childhood and in youth, by the grant of the manor of Clare, Suffolk and the fees of various possessions of the Honour of Clare in Suffolk, Cambridgeshire and Huntingdonshire, worth £100 per annum. As the King's health declined and the question of succession became imminent, on 2 June 1553 Cheke was sworn as one of the principal Secretaries of State and took his place in the Privy Council. If that had been in anticipation of the resignation of Sir William Petre or Sir William Cecil, in the event neither resigned and there were for that time three Secretaries, all of whom signed the Engagement of the Council written out by Petre to certify the King's appointment of the succession, and the Duke of Northumberland's Letters Patent to that effect, dated 21 June 1553.

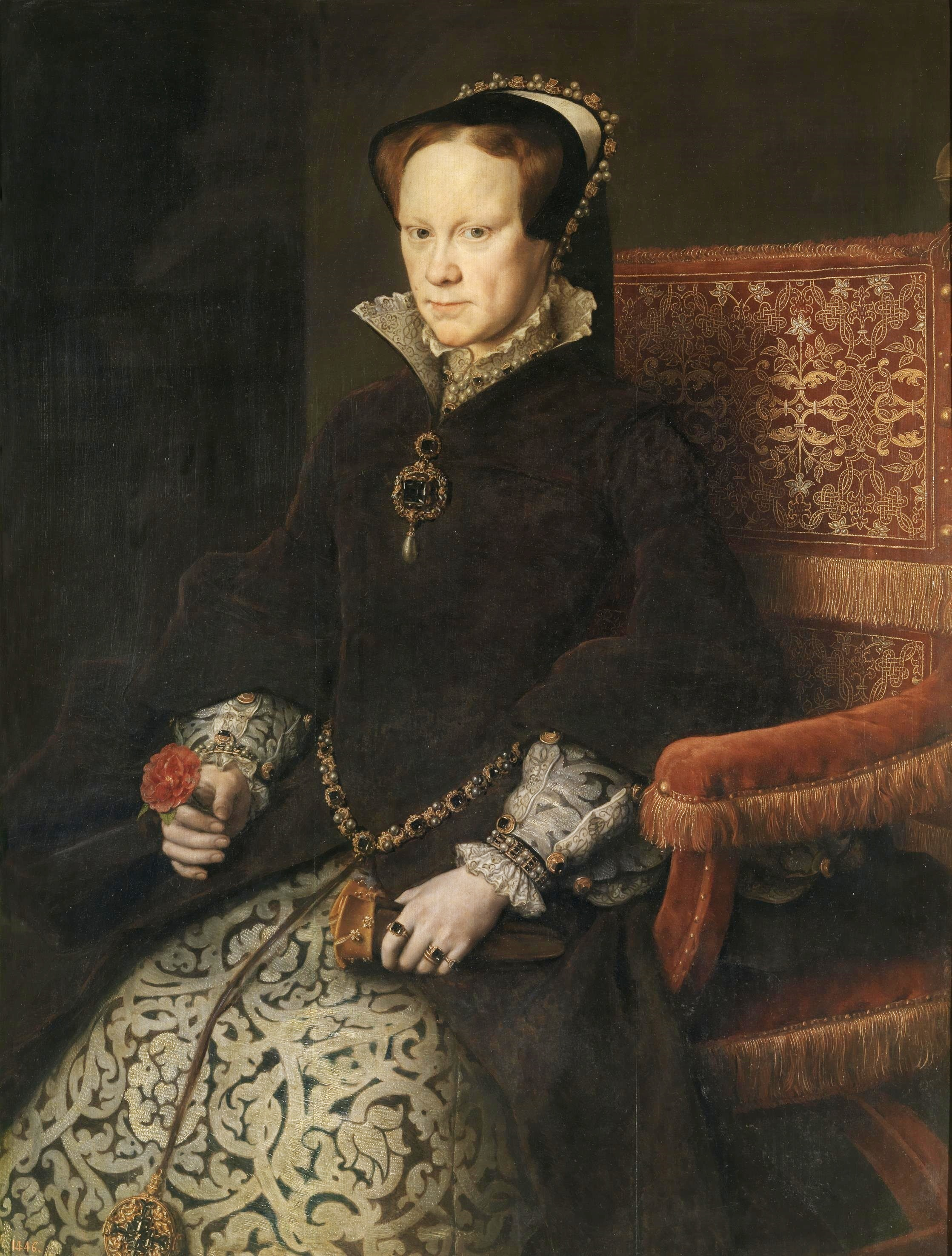
Queen Mary I

In Edward's last weeks Sir Thomas Wroth enfeoffed Cheke, and members of his own family, with his estates to the uses of his Wroth descendants, probably anticipating the danger of dispossession.

Roger Ascham wrote from Brussels to congratulate Cheke on future hopes for the King's reign, but too late. The King died on 6 July and Lady Jane Grey was proclaimed Queen on the 10th. Cheke remained as her Secretary of State and was loyal to her to the last. The council received a letter from Mary dated 9 July, from Kenninghall in Norfolk, stating her claim to the throne and demanding their loyalty. Sir John Cheke composed the reply of the same date, signed by the Lords of the council, informing her of Jane's rightful succession, of the witnessed and sealed deeds declaring the late King's will, and of their duty to her. He was present at the proclamation of Queen Mary on 19 July, hours after he had written to Lord Rich on behalf of the council to ensure his loyalty to Jane. He bowed to the inevitable.

Among the numerous arrests which followed, Sir John Cheke and the Duke of Suffolk (Queen Jane's father) were taken on 27 or 28 July 1553 and imprisoned in the Tower, articles of indictment being drawn up against him two weeks later. Cranmer, also imprisoned, wrote to Cecil for news of Cheke's welfare.

Following the executions of the Duke of Northumberland and Sir John Gates on 22 August, Mary's initial response was one of clemency. Cheke was released from the Tower on 13 September 1553. He ceased to be provost of King's College, Cambridge. His office in the Exchequer was granted to Robert Strelley in November 1553 and to Henry, Lord Stafford in February 1554. Cheke's property was seized, but in the spring of 1554 he was granted licence to go abroad. By the time his pardon for offences before 1 October 1553 was granted, on 28 April 1554, he had already left England.

== Marian exile ==
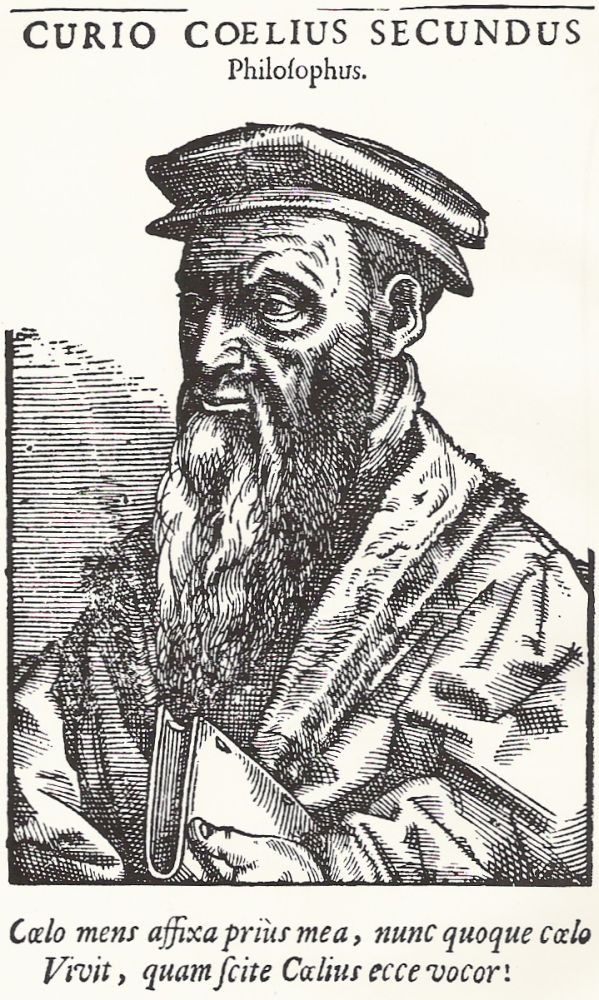
The Italian humanist Caelius Secundus Curio

Travelling under licence in early spring 1554, Cheke took with him Sir Thomas Wroth and Sir Anthony Cooke (who were not under licence), going first in April to Strasbourg and thence to Basel. There he met Caelius Secundus Curio, a distinguished Italian humanist, who had sent books and a greeting to Cheke in 1547. Cheke explained to him his system of Greek pronunciation and entrusted to him the correspondence between himself and Stephen Gardiner on that subject. By July 1554 they were in Italy, where at Padua he gave lectures upon Demosthenes in Greek to English students, met with Sir Thomas Wylson and many others, and entertained Sir Philip Hoby. Wroth, Cheke and Cooke, with their companies, joined with the Hoby party on an excursion to Mantua and Ferrara, returning to Padua in late November.

The following August, the Hobys' company having proceeded to Caldero beside Verona, Wroth and Cheke joined them there from Padua, avoiding a fresh outbreak of the plague, and they progressed north together through Rovereto, Innsbruck and Munich to Augsburg, where they arrived on 28 August 1555. After this the Hobys went on to Frankfurt, but Wroth and Cheke diverted to Strasbourg, and remained there, Cheke being chosen public Professor of the Greek tongue. During 1555 his correspondence with Bishop Gardiner on the Greek pronunciation was published at Basel by Curio without his knowledge; but not without provocation to Bishop Gardiner, now Lord Chancellor, and to his doctrine. Cheke remained in correspondence with Sir William Cecil at this time. Cheke may also have been in Emden to supervise the publication of his Latin edition of Thomas Cranmer's Defence of the True and Catholic Doctrine of the Sacrament of the Body and Blood of Christ and other Reformist publications.

In the spring of 1556 he visited Brussels to make a rendezvous with his wife, and, under promise of safe conduct, to meet with Lord Paget and Sir John Mason, his wife's stepfather. In the return journey, between Brussels and Antwerp, he and Sir Peter Carew were seized on 15 May 1556, by order of Philip II of Spain, and returned unceremoniously to England, where they were imprisoned in the Tower. In Cheke's words, he was "taken as it were in a whirlwind from the place he was in, and brought over sea, and never knew whither he went till he found himself in the Tower of London." John Poynet considered that Paget and Mason had treacherously arranged the arrest, causing them to be "taken by the Provost Marshall, spoiled of their horses, and clapt into a cart, their legs, arms, and bodies tyed with halters to the body of the cart, and so carried to the sea-side, and from thence into the Tower of London."

== Imprisonment, recantation and death ==
Cheke, whose wife was allowed to attend him, was visited by two priests and by Dr John Feckenham, Dean of St Paul's, with whom he had formerly disputed. Cheke wrote to the Queen expressing his willingness to obey her laws. Feckenham attempted to intercede for him, but nothing less than a full recantation, in prescribed terms, was acceptable to Mary. The fates of so many, of John Bradford, Rowland Taylor, Ridley, Latimer and Cranmer stood newly before him. In early September 1556 he wrote a submission to the Queen which Her Majesty approved, though he was made to write it out again for having failed to mention King Philip: Feckenham sent him some notes on the real presence. He agreed to be received into the Church of Rome by Cardinal Pole, and, following a public oration by John Feckenham, made his public recantation on 4 October 1556. John Foxe continues:

"Then after his recantation, hee was thorough the craftie handlyng of the catholikes, allured first to dine and company with them, at length drawen unwares to sit in place, where the pore Martyrs were brought before Boner and other Bishops to bee condemned, the remorse whereof so mightely wrought in his hart, that not longe after he lefte this mortal life. Whose fall although it was full of infirmitie, yet his rising again by repentaunce was greate, and his ende comfortable, the Lorde bee praised."

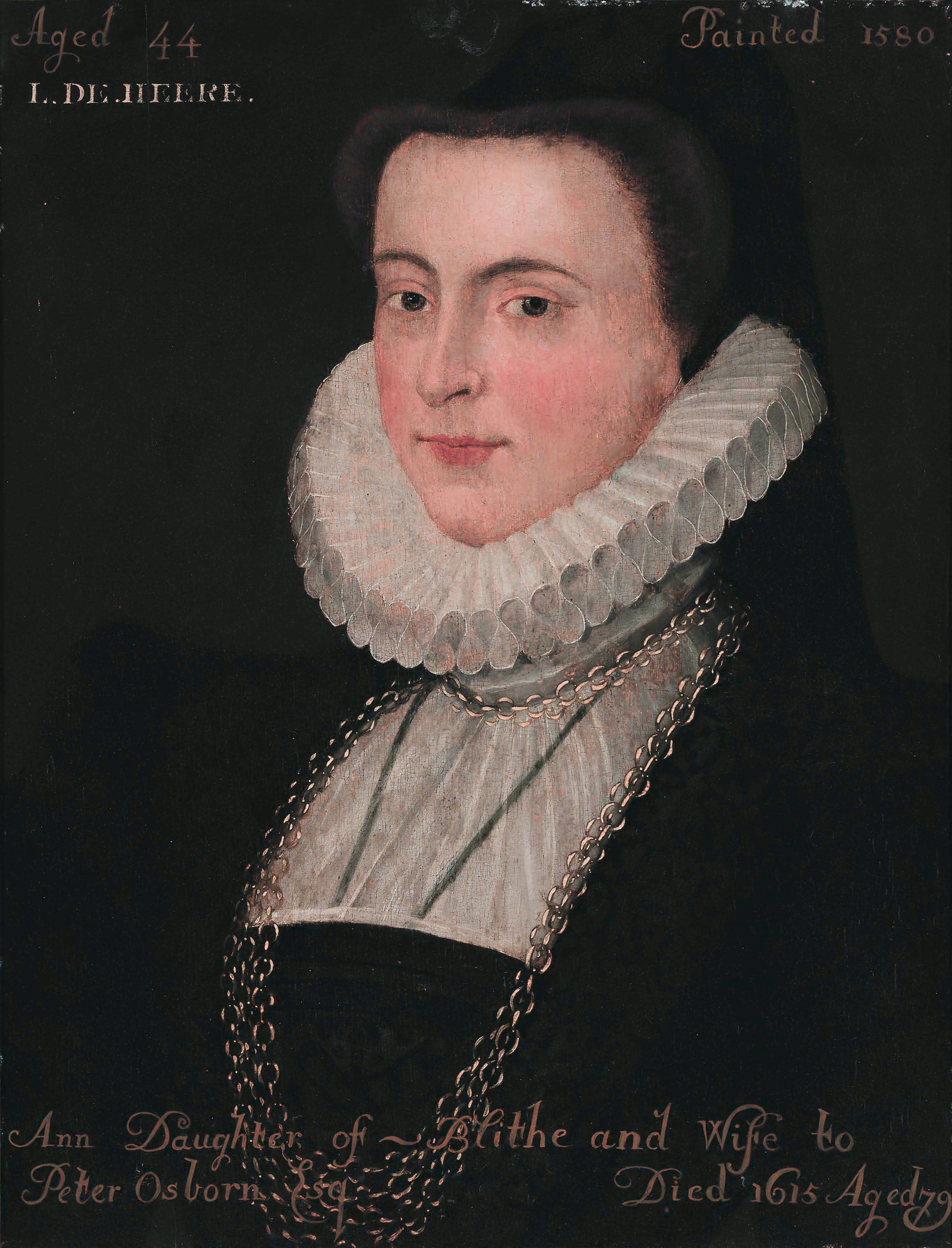
Anne Blythe, wife of Peter Osborne.

In the wake of his recantation the confiscated freehold properties in the eastern counties granted to him by King Edward VI were restored to him but immediately exchanged for other freehold lands in Suffolk, Devon and Somerset providing for an annual return of almost £250. He surrendered ownership of the Manor of Barnardiston to Queen Mary on 31 May 1557. In July 1557, living at Peter Osborne's house in Wood Street (Cheapside), he wrote to Sir Thomas Hoby thanking him for inviting his editorial comments on Hoby's translation of The Courtier (Il Cortegiano) of Baldassare Castiglione, over the Preface to which he had taken some pains. An advocate of English linguistic purism, he remarked "our own tung shold be written cleane and pure, vnmixt and vnmangeled with borowing of other tunges... For then doth our tung naturallie and praisablie vtter her meaning"; and he complimented Hoby on the 'roundness' of his 'saienges and welspeakinges'.

His brief will, providing for an annuity of £10 for his son Henry's continuing education, making his wife and his friend and kinsman Peter Osborne (husband of Cheke's niece Anne Blythe) his executors and his "deerely beloved" Sir John Mason his overseer, was written on 13 September 1557. Mylady Cheke, Mistress Osborne and his son's schoolmaster William Irelande (a distinguished early pupil of Roger Ascham's) were among the witnesses. He died, aged 43, on the same day, at Osborne's house in London, carrying, as Thomas Fuller remarked, "God's pardon and all good men's pity along with him." The will was proved on 18 January following. He was buried at St Alban, Wood Street and had a memorial inscription there, written by Walter Haddon, recorded by Gerard Langbaine:

"Doctrinae CHECUS linguae{que} utrius{que} Magister
Aurea naturae fabrica morte jacet.
Non erat ė multis unus, sed praestitit unus
Omnibus, et patriae flos erat ille suae.
Gemma Britanna fuit: tam magnum nulla tulerunt
Tempora thesaurum; tempora nulla ferent."

Translation:

CHEKE, Master both of doctrine and of tongues,
The golden stuff of nature lies in death.
He shone as one pre-eminent, not of many,
But first among all, for He was the flower of his nation.
He was Britain's Gem: no times have brought
So great a treasure, nor times shall ever bring.

== Legacy ==
Roger Ascham remembered him as "My dearest frend, and best master that ever I had or heard in learning, Syr I. Cheke, soch a man, as if I should live to see England breed the like againe, I feare, I should live over long..." Thomas Wilson, in the epistle prefixed to his translation of the Olynthiacs of Demosthenes (1570), has a long and interesting eulogy of Cheke; and Thomas Nashe, in a preface to Robert Greene's Menaphon (1589), called him "the Exchequer of eloquence, Sir John Cheke, a man of men, supernaturally traded in all tongues." The antiquary John Gough Nichols, who (after John Strype) developed historiographical understanding of Sir John Cheke, called him "in many respects, one of the most interesting personages of the century." Milton, in his Tetrachordon, writes that "Sir John Cheeke the Kings Tutor, [was] a Man at that time counted the learnedest of Englishmen," and his Sonnet 11 finishes with the lines: Thy age, like ours, O Soul of Sir John Cheek [sic], / Hated not Learning wors then Toad or Asp; / When thou taught'st Cambridge, and King Edward Greek."

=== Portraits ===
A portrait of Sir John Cheke is attributed to Claude Corneille de Lyon. The line engraving attributed to Willem de Passe, published in 1620, might be based on an earlier portrait. The Joseph Nutting engraving published in Strype's Life of 1705 apparently derives from the same source as a later engraving by James Fittler, A.R.A., after a drawing by William Skelton, itself said to be based on an original picture at Ombersley Court, Worcestershire, formerly in possession of the Dowager Marchioness of Devonshire. The portrait formerly in the collection of the Dukes of Manchester at Kimbolton Castle was sold at Christie's in 2020.

== Children ==
- Henry Cheke (c. 1548–1586) married first Frances Radclyffe (sister of Edward Radclyffe), by whom he had three sons and two daughters, and second Frances daughter of Marmaduke Constable of York. He became a member of parliament and travelled in Italy in 1576–79. He was the translator of Francesco Negri's Italian morality play, Libero Arbitrio, as Freewyl.
  - (Sir) Thomas Cheke, son of Henry, was also a member of parliament and settled at Pyrgo in Essex. He married Lady Essex Rich (daughter of Robert Rich, 1st Earl of Warwick), and was the father of Essex Cheke.
- John Cheke (died 1580) was in the retinue of his uncle Lord Burghley for at least six years, but become impatient of his life and persuaded his master to release him so that he could take up the life of a soldier. He was killed in 1580 by a Spanish sniper during the siege of Dún An Óir (the Fort del Ore at Smerwick in the Dingle Peninsula of County Kerry). He died without issue.
- Edward Cheke. He was living at his father's death, but died without issue.

== Writings ==
Gerard Langbaine gives this list of his writings:

Original

- Introductio Grammaticus, 1 book
- De Ludimagistrorum Officio, 1 book
- De pronunciatione linguae Graecae.
- Corrections to Herodotus, Thucidides, Plato, Demosthenes, and Xenophon. Many books
- Epitaphia, 1 book
- Panegyricum in nativitatem EDVARDI Principis.
- Elegia de Aegrotatione et Obitu EDVARDI VI.
- In obitum Antonii Denneii, 1 book
- De obitu Buceri.
- Commentarii in Psalmum CXXXIX et alios.
- An liceat nubere post Divortium, 1 book
- De Fide Iustificante, 1 book
- De Aqua Lustrali, Cineribus, et Palmis, ad [Stephen Gardiner] Wintoniensem, 1 book
- De Eucharistiae Sacramento, 1 book
- He collected the arguments and rationales in Parliament on either side in the question of the Eucharist.
- He edited a book on The Hurt of Sedition.

Translations from Greek into Latin

- Euripides and Sophocles quaedam ad literam.
- Aristotle De Anima.
- Demosthenes Olynthiacs, Philippics, and Contra Leptinem.
- Aeschines and Demosthenes, Orationes adversariae.
- Plutarch, De Superstitione.
- Leo Imperator, De Apparatu Bellico.
- Josephus, De Antiquitatibus Iudaicis.
- St John Chrysostom, Homilies:
  - Contra Observatores Novilunii, 1 book, and De Dormientibus in Christo, 1 book.
  - De Providentia Dei, 3 books, and De Fato, 3 books.
- St Maximus, Monachi Asceticum.

Translations from English into Latin

- Thomas Cranmer Liber de Sacramentis.
- Officium de Communione.

An edition of his English translation of the Gospel of St Matthew, in his own spelling system, appeared in 1843.

Many of Cheke's works are still in manuscript: some have been altogether lost.

== See also ==
- Secretary of State (England)

== Notes ==
=== References ===
Academic offices
Preceded by George Day	Provost of King's College, Cambridge; 1549–1553	Succeeded by Richard Atkinson
Political offices
Preceded by William Cecil	Secretary of State; June – July 1553	Succeeded by John Bourne
