= Stambourne Hall =

Historic house in Stambourne, Essex, England

Coordinates: 52.0218°N 0.5083°E

Stambourne Hall is a country house within the civil parish of Stambourne, Essex, England. It lies to behind to the northeast of St. Peter & St. Thomas's Church, Stambourne. Stambourne Hall is recorded in the National Heritage List for England as a Grade II listed building.

Historic England states the house dates to the 15th century. It is of five bedrooms in an L shape that were originally two separate houses, both of manorial status but of different types and dates. The houses were later joined and the whole has been substantially altered over the centuries. The site is moated and extends over seven acres. According to the previous owner, a conservation architect, the house was built in 1348, according to a date on the central hearth.

Member of Parliament Henry Macwilliam (c. 1532–86) lived in the house. Macwilliam's grandson, Sir Charles Stanhope sold the manor of Stambourne to Rachael, the widow of Sir John Cambell of Clay Hall, Barking.

In the nineteenth century the house was occupied by the Fry family of chocolate makers.

In July 2015, the house was for sale with an asking price of £1.65 million.

The Hodge family are now the owners (2017).
