= Thomas Bagehott =

Thomas Bagehott, also known as Thomas Badger, was an English courtier, masque dancer, royal huntsman, and Member of Parliament for Stockbridge (1625 and 1626) and Lostwithiel (1628–1629).

== Career ==
He was a son of George Bagehott of Hall Place, Noverton, Prestbury, Gloucestershire, and Alice, daughter of Richard Wakeman of The Mythe. He signed his name as "Thomas Bager".

He was knighted on 23 July 1603, in the days before the coronation of James I and Anne of Denmark. In 1605, Bagehott was appointed Master of the King's Harriers or Old Harriers.

Bagehott was a regular performer in court theatre, appearing in December 1604 in the masque at the wedding of Philip Herbert and Susan de Vere. There are few details of the performance and the masque has been given the title Juno and Hymenaeus. According to Dudley Carleton, the show "for conceit and fashion was suitable to the occasion" and the "apparel was rather costly than comely; but their dancing full of life and variety". Carleton noted the performer's names and described a lack of decorum amongst the audience:

The actors were the Earl of Penbrooke, the Lord Willoby, Sir James Hayes, Sir Thomas Germain, Sir Robert Cary, Sir John Lee, Sir Richard Preston and Sir Thomas Bager. There was no small loss that night of chayne and Jewells; and many great Ladies were made shorter by the skirts, and were well enough served that could keepe cutt no better".

In 1606, Bagehott was a defender of Opinion against Truth in the Barriers at a Marriage at the wedding of Frances Howard and the Earl of Essex, and as a knight of Apollo in Lord Hay's Masque at the wedding of Sir James Hay and Honora Denny, daughter of Edward, Lord Denny, and in the "running masque" of January 1620.

Bagehott was included in Lord Hay's embassy to France in 1616. John Chamberlain reported Lady Haddington's joke that Hay's companions "Sir Thomas German, Sir Rafe Shelton, and Sir Thomas Badger" were fools and buffoons.

In January 1618, Bagehott acted with other courtiers at Theobalds led by Sir John Finet in an interlude featuring "Tom of Bedlam the Tinker" intended to amuse King James who was suffering from gout. The cast included: Thomas Dutton, George Goring, Thomas Tyringham, Robert Yaxley, William Uvedale, Arthur Lake, Edward Zouch, and George Garret. The King however was displeased by the play, especially the lyrics sung or written by Finet, and John Chamberlain was surprised that "none had the judgement to see how unfit it was to bring such beastly gear in public before a prince". John Bingley was knighted on this occasion.

Bagehott developed a reputation as an entertainer at the court of King James, and his name was included in the ballad Listen jolly gentleman with other courtiers with whom the king "loves to be merry":

Att Royston and Newmarkett he'll hunt till he be leane,
But hee hath merry boys that with masks, and toyes,
Can make him fatt againe,
Nedd Zouch, Harrie Riche, Tom Badger,
George Goring, and Jacke Finett,
Will dance a heate till they stincke of sweat.

King James alluded to "Tom Badger" and his breeding of dogs in his letters to the Duke of Buckingham, and Buckingham mentions Bagehott as his confidante in their correspondence. An influential 19th-century editor, James Orchard Halliwell, and the historian John Heneage Jesse assumed that "Tom Badger" was just another nickname or cant name used by King James for Buckingham.

In 1628, Bagehott sent a live fox to Ben Jonson as a present when the poet was ill with palsy. Jonson recalled this gift in a letter to the Duke of Newcastle in 1631. Jonson wrote that this "creature, by handling, I endeavoured to make tame, as well for the abating of my disease".

In 1631, Charles I allowed Bagehott to form a partnership with Thomas Pott and Timothy Tyrrell (Master of the Buckhounds) with an exclusive patent to breed and export dogs. The dogs would be bred and trained in England or Wales.

== In fiction ==
Although Thomas Bagehott was unmarried and is not known to have had children, his son "Tobie Badger" is mentioned in a fictitious account of a Masque of Birch provided as a satirical commentary on The Twelve Days of Christmas by Alice Bowman to the Westminster Gazette in 1908.
