= Bridget Annesley =

Bridget Annesley (fl. 1610–1630) was a courtier to Anne of Denmark, wife of James VI and I.

Bridget Annesley was a daughter of Robert Annesley of Rathverd or Rathuard and Newport Pagnell, an undertaker of the plantations in Munster, and Beatrix Cornwall, a daughter of John Cornwall of Moor Park, Hertfordshire.

The surname "Annesley" was sometimes written "Anslow" or "Anslowe".

Bridget Annesley became one of the servants of Anne of Denmark, called maids of honour or "chamberers", a lady of the bedchamber in 1609. She may have got this appointment through her mother's parents, who lived near the Earl of Bedford and the Countess of Bedford's house at The More. The Countess of Bedford was influential with the queen. Another link was that the manor of Newport Pagnell belonged to the queen.

Anne of Denmark gave clothes to Bridget Annesley. On 6 January 1610, she received a night gown of carnation and white taffeta, and on 8 December 1610 a dove-coloured taffeta gown with stripes of black and white made for the queen two years previously. Annesley was given mourning clothes on the death of Prince Henry in 1612. In 1614 she was bought a bay ambling gelding horse for £18 to replace her lame grey gelding.

She was known as "the queen's servant Mrs Anslow" in 1616, when her brother Francis Annesley (d. 1660) was promoted to be a joint-secretary of Ireland. Bridget Annesley may have helped her brother gain the favour of the king's new favourite George Villiers, who could assist his friends in careers and appointments.

When the queen died in 1619 the other chamberers were; Elizabeth Murray (probably the Countess of Annandale), Marie Mayerne sister of Théodore de Mayerne who married Gian Francesco Biondi in 1622; Elizabeth Devick, a former attendant of Lady Edmondes; and Mary Gargrave as Maid of Honour, the daughter of Sir Cotton Gargrave and Anne Waterton, and Elizabeth Foukes who was probably a niece of John Finet. Bridget walked in the funeral procession with the ladies of the Privy Chamber, listed as "Mrs Anslow".

In 1627, Bridget Annesley petitioned for payment of back wages amounting to £866.

Connections made in the queen's household were strengthened in 1637 when her niece Beatrice Annesley, Francis Annesley's daughter, married James Zouch, the son of Dorothea Silking, her Danish colleague in the queen's bedchamber, and Sir Edward Zouch of Woking.

The dates of Bridget Annesley's birth and death are unknown.
