= Dorothy Silking =

Danish courtier

Dorothy Silking (fl. 1608–1640) was a Danish courtier, one of the chamberers in the household of Anne of Denmark.

== Career ==
Records of the royal household refer to her as "Mistress Dorothy", or "Dorothy Silkin" or "Silken", or "Selken". She was from Güstrow. Her name appears as "Dorothea Silking, of an ancient family in the kingdom of Denmark" on her daughter's monument at Ketton church, Kedington, Suffolk.

Dorothy's work for Anna of Denmark included looking after her silver plate and jewellery. She was probably a successor of Margaret Hartsyde who was accused of stealing the queen's jewels and trying to sell them back to George Heriot. The queen gave Dorothea and her sister Jyngell Silking gifts of clothes as a mark of favour. An inventory of the jewels of Anne of Denmark mentions that "Mrs Dorothy" returned a bracelet to the queen's cabinet in 1607.

=== The mine at Corston ===
In October 1609 Silking attempted to open a coal mine on a royal manor at Corston, Somerset, a right she had presumably been given by the queen as a reward. The manor of Corston was part of the queen's jointure lands. Silking wrote to the Earl of Salisbury about permissions and patents, signing her name "Dorothy Selkane". George Carew, the queen's chamberlain, wrote to the lawyer Julius Caesar for support on her behalf. It is not clear that Silking's venture was successful.

=== Sisters at court ===
"Dorthee" and "Engella Seelken" were naturalized as English citizens in July 1610 at the same time as other members of the queen's household, including; Katherine Benneken from Garlstorf, the queen's doctor Martin Schöner from Głogów, the apothecary John Wolfgang Rumler from Augsburg and his wife Anna de l'Obel from Middelburg, a daughter of Matthias de l'Obel. Dorothy and "Mrs Ingle" were both given mourning clothes on the death of Prince Henry in 1612, as the women of the bedchamber "La: Souche and Mris Ingle".

=== Lady Zouch of Woking ===
She married Edward Zouch of Woking in 1612, and was usually known as "Lady Zouch". In 1635 Reverend George Garrard, who had been at court in the household of Prince Henry, recalled that Silking was "a Dane, one that served Queen Anne in her bedchamber. I knew her well, a homely woman, but being very rich Zouch married her for her wealth".

The jeweller George Heriot recorded in his accounts for 1613 that the "Lady Sutch" owed him £81 which "she affirmes her Majesty is pleased to paye".

At the funeral of Anne of Denmark in 1619, "Lady Zouch" walked in procession, listed with the ladies of the Privy Chamber.

When an inventory of the late queen's silver plate at Denmark House was taken in 1621, the Zouches were asked to supply a shortfall worth £492-19 shillings, including a gold casting bottle engraved with the arms of Queen Elizabeth. Edward Zouch successfully claimed that a warrant signed by Dorothea Silking was a forgery because she could not write her name, and they were not liable.

Edward Zouch died in 1634, and the year after their 17-year-old daughter Sophia was married to Viscount Wimbledon, a 63-year-old war veteran, the age difference attracted comment from Sir John Finet.

Her son James Zouch married Beatrice Annesley (1619–1668), daughter of Francis Annesley, then Lord Mountnorris. In 1638 Mountnorris advised James Zouch, after consulting his steward Andrew Conradus, that in view of his debts he ought to live more economically with his mother and just four or five servants for £100 a year.

After the death of James Zouch in 1643, Beatrice Zouch married Sir John Lloyd of Woking and the Forest (d. 1664) while their son was still an infant, and then Sir Thomas Smith of Hill Hall, Essex (d. 1668), according to a law case heard before the Lord Chancellor in 1669. The mother and son in this case were noted to be related to Arthur Annesley, 1st Earl of Anglesey. The case was brought by a creditor of Sir Edward Zouch called Gilpen, against Dorothea's grandson as his heir.

The exact dates of Dorothea's birth and death are unknown.

== Family ==
Dorothy's children included;

- James Zouch (1615–1643), who married Beatrice Annesley (1619–1668), a daughter of Francis Annesley, 1st Viscount Valentia. She was a niece of Bridget Annesley, a companion of Dorothy Silking in Anne of Denmark's bedchamber. James and her brother had travelled together on a Grand Tour.
- Sophia Zouch (1618–1691), who married (1) in September 1635 Edward Cecil, 1st Viscount Wimbledon (1572–1638), and had a child called Algernon who died young, (2) Robert King of Boyle Abbey, County Roscommon (d. 1657). Her daughter Elizabeth King married Thomas Barnadiston. Sophia was buried at Ketton in Suffolk.
