= Elizabeth Devick =

Servant of Anne of Denmark

Elizabeth Devick or De Vic (fl. 1600-1620) was a servant of Anne of Denmark.

She was a member of the household of Magdalen Wood, the wife of the English diplomat Thomas Edmondes. In May 1615 Edmondes gave her £100 after the death of his wife, for her long service.

On 14 February 1613 she added a Valentine's day greeting to Jean Beaulieu's letter from Paris to William Trumbull and his wife and daughter "pretty Betty".

At the end of June 1615 she travelled from Paris to Pougues with the Countess of Pembroke.

Elizabeth Devick joined the household of Anne of Denmark in March 1617 as a lady in waiting, or "chamberer". She went to join the queen's household at Oatlands Palace where she swore the customary oath of loyalty and service on 24 August 1617. At the Queen's death in 1619 she reckoned to have two years service in wages.

She was with the queen, who had been ill, at Hampton Court and told a visitor that she now "began to sit up and walk about her chamber, which for 6 weeks before she was not able to do."

When the queen died in 1619 the other chamberers were; Elizabeth Murray (probably the Countess of Annandale); Marie Mayerne, sister of Théodore de Mayerne who married Gian Francesco Biondi in 1622; Bridget Annesley; and Mary Gargrave as Maid of Honour. Elizabeth Devick attended the queen's funeral, listed with the ladies of the Privy Chamber.

Subsequently there was "much talk" in London about provision for her servants, "Mistris de Vicg" was to have rewards and pensions pro rata. The King delayed making a settlement but the terms were announced to satisfy the Danish ambassador.

The exact date of Elizabeth Devick's death is unknown.
