= Woking Palace =

Manor house in Woking, Surrey, England

Coordinates: 51.3033°N 0.5245°W

Woking Palace is a former manor house of the Royal Manor of Woking on the outskirts of Woking, near the village of Old Woking, Surrey.

The manor was in the gift of the Crown, and was held by numerous nominees of the Crown until 1466 when Lady Margaret Beaufort and her third husband, Sir Henry Stafford obtained the Manor by royal grant. Margaret Beaufort was the mother of Henry VII of England.

== History ==
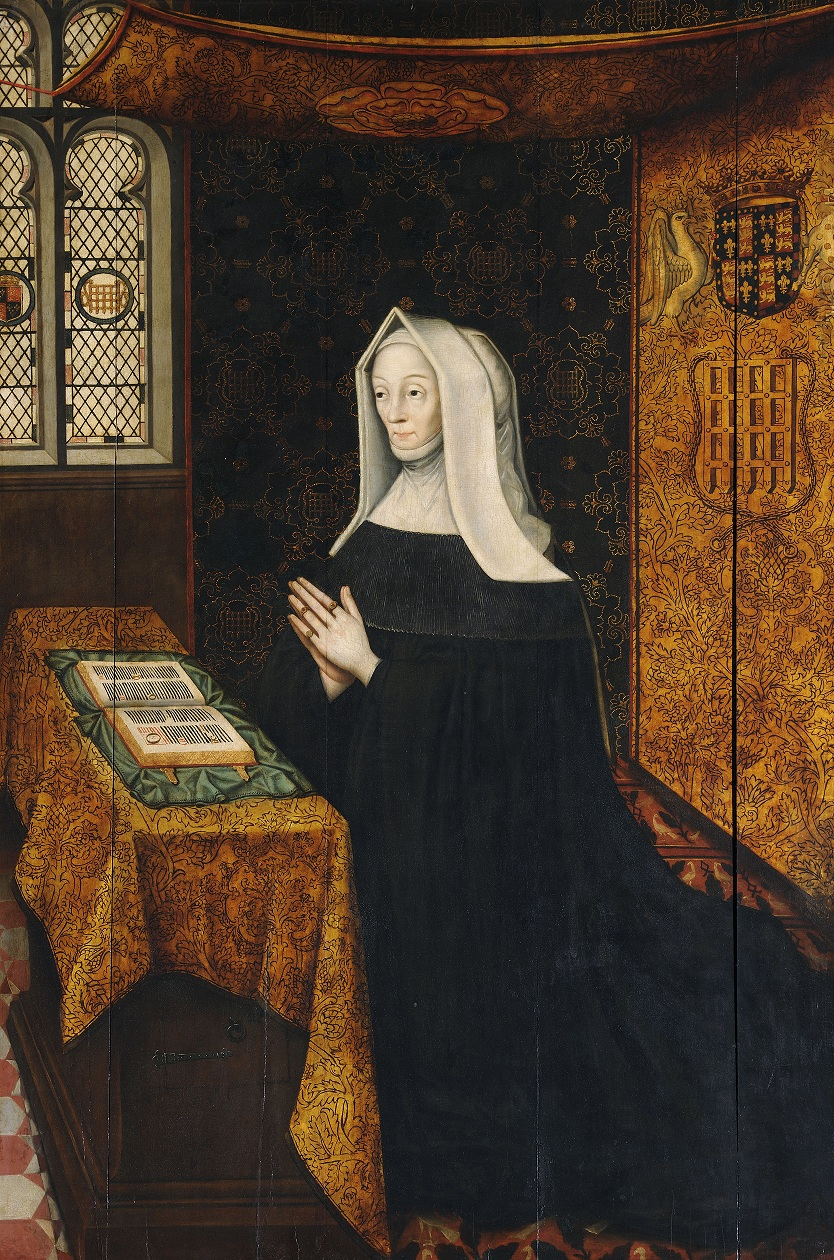
Lady Margaret Beaufort at prayer, by Rowland Lockey hung at the university college she founded, St John's College, Cambridge

The first mention of a house on the site is in 1272. There is also later recorded use by Lady Margaret Beaufort, her son Henry VII and her grandson Henry VIII. Woking Manor House was converted into a palace by Henry VII in 1503 and was subsequently remodelled by Henry VIII and Elizabeth I. The site comprises buried and exposed ruins of its old buildings on a cut and grazed water meadow.

It was held by numerous nominees of the Crown until 1466 when Lady Margaret Beaufort and her third husband (of four), Sir Henry Stafford obtained the Manor by royal grant of Edward IV.

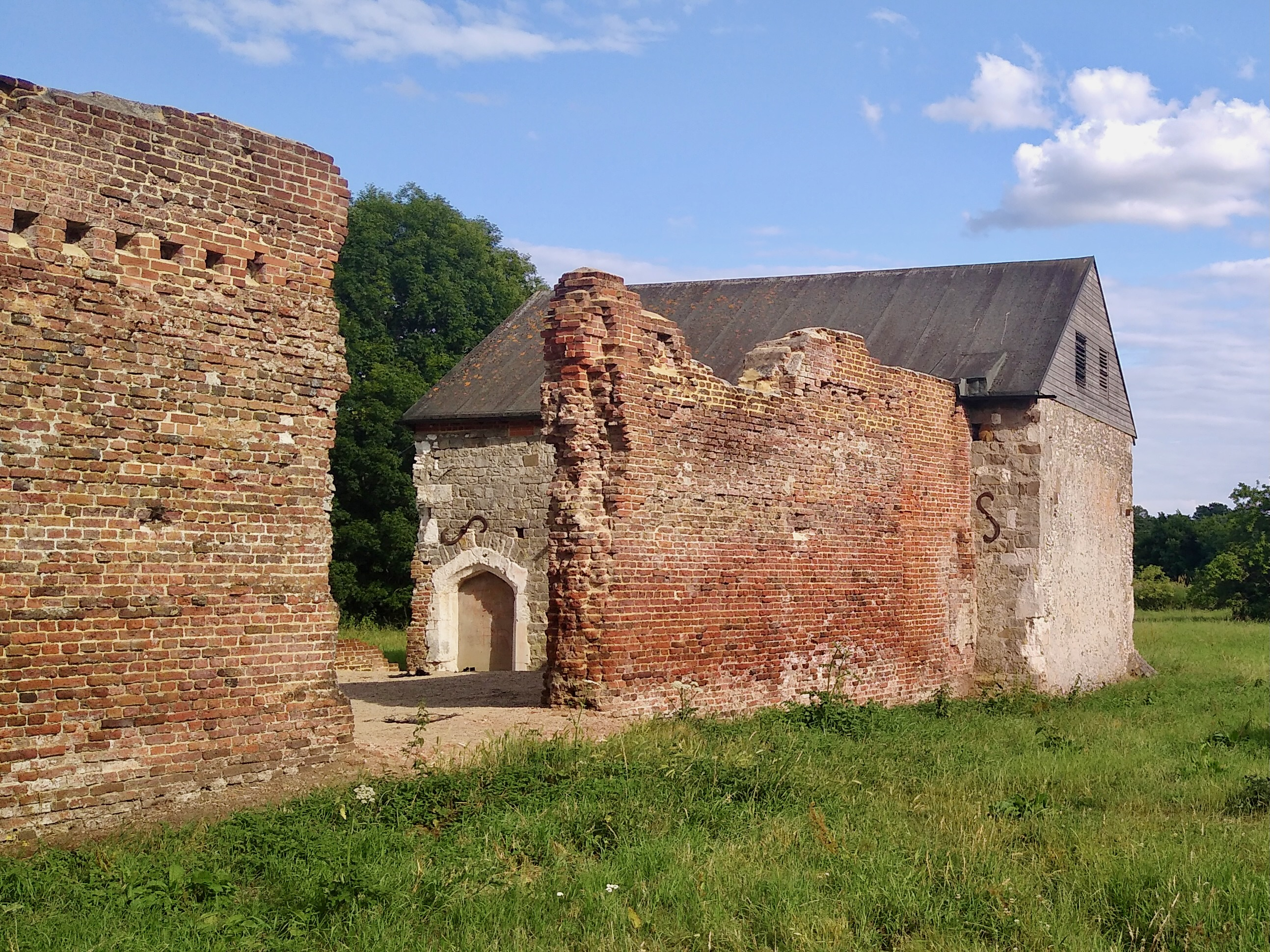
The ruins of Woking Palace in 2023. The stone building is an original part of the palace, but the brick walls are part of a 16th-century barn.

The palace was moated and can be separated into four parts: north east quadrant; the medieval barrel vault and the King's Hall, built by Henry VII in 1508, in the south east; the King's Garden on the south west; and the Copse to the north west, once the orchard. Woking Borough Council, as custodians, have built a protective roof over the barrel vault, installed a lockable door and carried out protective repairs to the remaining Tudor wall. The King's Garden was originally a formal kitchen garden but is now a rough meadow. The Copse contains two large linear fish ponds and a smaller round pond. The moat is on three sides whilst the River Wey enclosed the site on the fourth side.

Henry VIII often visited Woking Palace and throughout his reign it underwent regular maintenance as well as some alterations. Additions approved commissioned by him included a new wharf by the river Wey and two new bowling alleys. Maintenance works included the replacement of bridge planks, alterations to room partitions, plastering and painting, replacement of glass in windows, retiling of roofs and fireplaces, and, the installation of new windows.

=== King James and Edward Zouch ===
King James VI and I visited Woking in March 1606. While he was there, a false rumour spread in London that he had been assassinated with some of his courtiers by Catholic conspirators using poisoned knives or pistol shot. Whitehall Palace and the Tower of London were secured. The king quickly returned to London unharmed and the church bells were rung at St Margaret's, Westminster.

Sir Edward Zouch, the Knight Marshal, was made steward of Woking Manor or Palace and keeper of the park on 9 May 1609 by King James. In June 1609 Simon Basil, the surveyor of the royal works, came to Woking to estimate costs for repairs to the manor, office houses, a wharf, and two bridges. The King's Lodging was already in good repair. Zouch asked Basil to estimate for cleaning out the moat and building a new bridge over the river at the front of the house. This would increase the privacy of the king's garden. King James was a frequent visitor to Woking, often coming in the month of March.

Zouch was granted the estate in 1620. He may well have allowed its buildings to be plundered to build a new mansion nearly a mile away, Hoe Bridge Place. Zouch was one of the proprietors of the Plymouth Colony in America and the North Virginia Company. He was first keeper of Woking Park, including the Palace, and in 1620 acquired it from a cash-strapped crown for a rent of £100 a year and the duty of serving the first dish to the king on a feast on St James's Day.

When the King was at Oatlands Palace he often came for revels with Zouch playing the fool, singing bawdy songs and telling bawdy tales. He stayed with Zouch at the start of September 1624 and hunted towards Busbridge. He wrote to the Duke of Buckingham that he would stay longer, "so earnest I am to kill more of Zouch's great stags." In 1631, not long before Zouch died, his tenants made a long list of grievances and exploitations. In his will he contributed to the maintenance of Old Woking Church, and requested that he was to be buried at night.

By the reign of Charles II (1660–1685), the palace appears to have been abandoned and virtually ruined.

== Archaeology ==
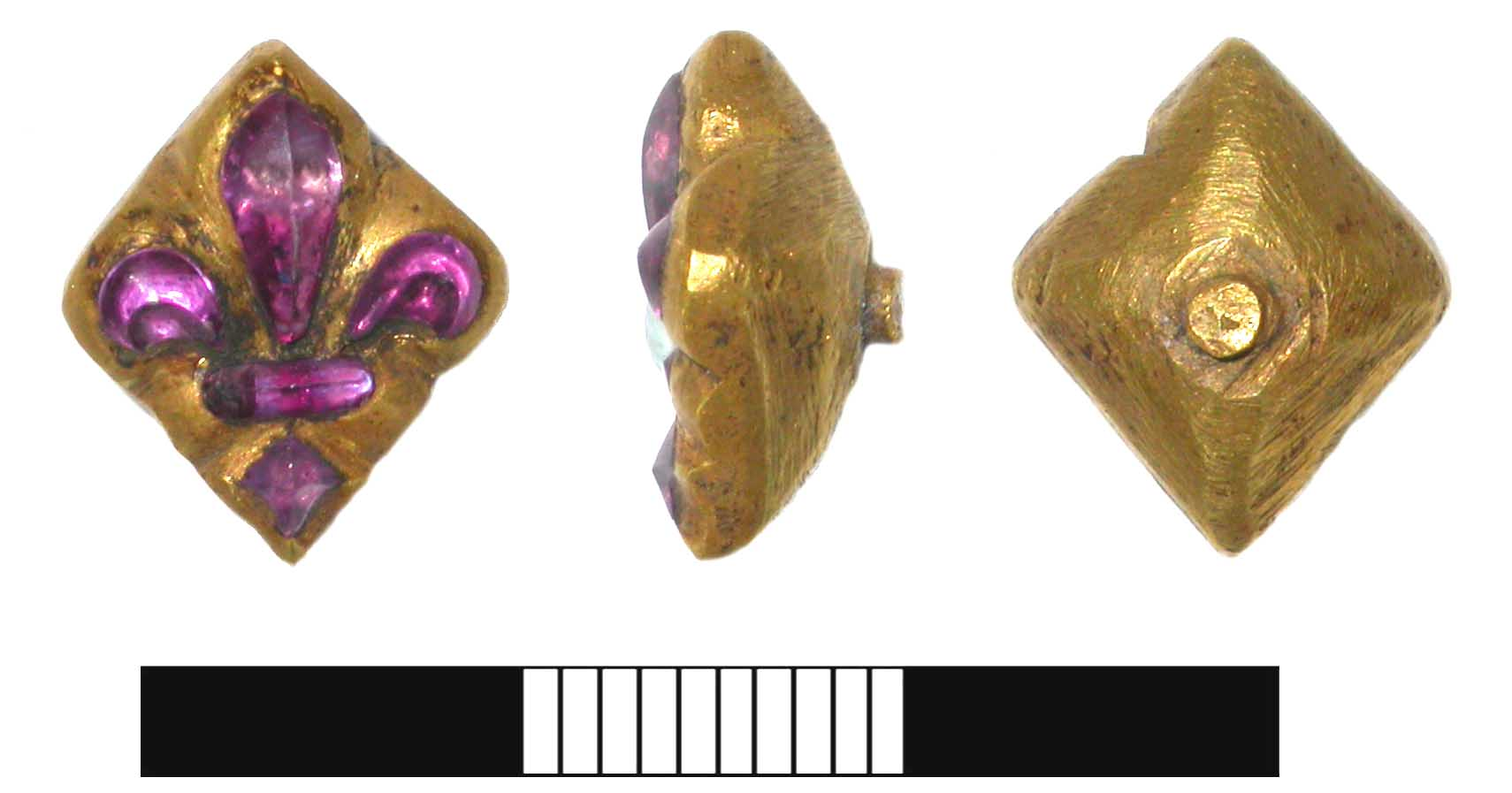
1400-1550 gold and amethyst pin found at the site, published under PAS government records

The Portable Antiquities Scheme records cover many finds, including those subject to the Treasure Act 1996, creating the criminal offence of not declaring finds of precious metals, prehistoric base metal, and finds in association with them.

The public record for the site as at 2026 comprises:

1. a 1400 to 1550 gold brooch/pin set with a fleur de lys made from amethyst (an inlay).
2. a "close parallel" to a c.1750-1900 copper alloy object, perhaps originally cylindrical and in the form of a lid, with a lead or solder filling. The parallelled object bears the image of a horse prancing to the left.

=== Preservation, visitor facilities and future work ===
Woking Palace has been assessed among royal sites of the pre-16th century as an "excellent survival", highly diverse, with large archaeological potential spanning the island and the waterlogged moats. A high "amenity value" in legal planning terms (see listed building) attaches to the site equating to its relatively important national historic, architectural and archaeological values.

The site is designated a Scheduled Ancient Monument (under the Ancient Monuments and Archaeological Areas Act 1979 as amended by the in 1983). It is owned by Woking Borough Council.
