= Edward Zouche =

Edward Zouche or Zouch may refer to:

- Edward la Zouche, 11th Baron Zouche (1556–1625)
- Edward Zouch (died 1634) of Woking
