= James Hay, 2nd Earl of Carlisle =

The Right Honourable James Hay
- Earl of Carlisle
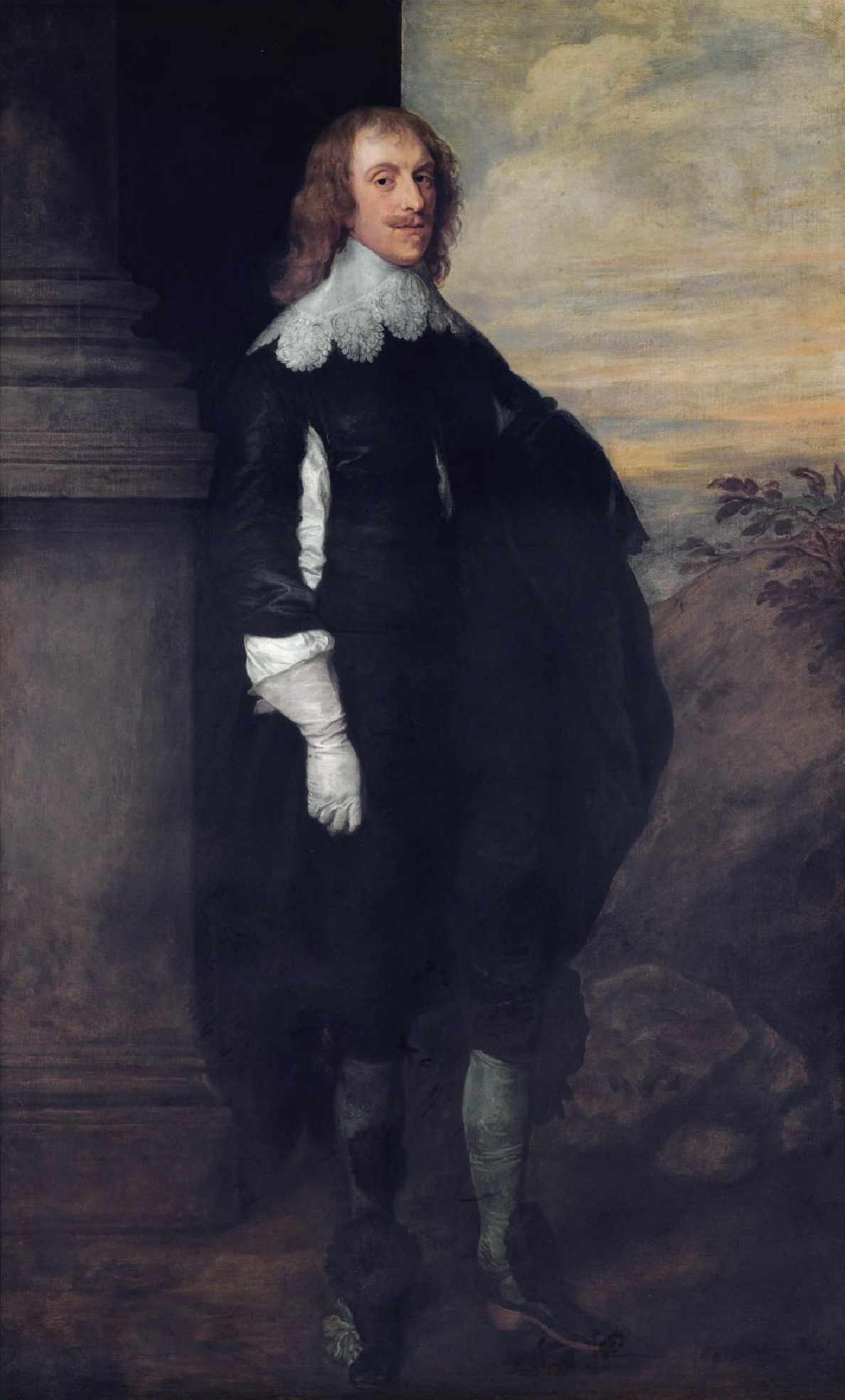
- Painting by Anthony van Dyck

- Coat of arms
- Tenure: 1636–1660
- Predecessor: James Hay, 1st Earl of Carlisle
- Successor: Extinct
- Born: 1612
- Died: 30 October 1660 (aged 47–48)
- Spouse: Margaret Russell (m. 1632)
- Father: James Hay, 1st Earl of Carlisle
- Mother: Honora Denny

James Hay, 2nd Earl of Carlisle (1612 – 30 October 1660) was the Earl of Carlisle (2nd Creation), succeeding James Hay, 1st Earl of Carlisle. Hay was the second son of the 1st Earl, a Scottish nobleman, and his wife Honoria, heir to Edward Denny, 1st Earl of Norwich.

James Hay was Colonel of a Regiment of Foot in Germany, and was appointed Knight of the Order of the Bath.

In 1632 he married Margaret Russell, third daughter of Francis Russell, 4th Earl of Bedford. In 1639 he inherited the Carlisle Islands, later called Barbados. Between 1642 and 1646 he was a Royalist Colonel of a Regiment of Horse. He lived mainly in Barbados but returned in 1652. He died without issue on 30 October 1660. At his death, the peerage became extinct in the Hay family.

Political offices
Preceded by The 2nd Earl of Warwick	Lord Lieutenant of Essex; 1641–1642; Served alongside: The 2nd Earl of Warwick	English Interregnum
Preceded by The 2nd Earl of Warwick	Custos Rotulorum of Essex; 1642–1646	English Interregnum
Honorary titles
English Interregnum	Custos Rotulorum of Essex; 1660	Succeeded by The 4th Earl of Warwick
Peerage of England
Preceded by James Hay	Earl of Carlisle; 1636–1660	Extinct
