= Lord Hay's Masque =

Play written by Thomas Campion

Lord Hay's Masque was an early Jacobean era masque, written by Thomas Campion, with costumes, sets and stage effects designed by Inigo Jones. The masque was performed on Twelfth Night, 6 January 1607, in the Great Hall of Whitehall Palace. It was the premier event at the Stuart Court for the 1606-7 Christmas holiday season.

== The marriage ==
Lord Hay's Masque celebrated the marriage of an important Scottish aristocrat Sir James Hay and a socially prominent English gentlewoman Honora Denny, daughter of Edward, Lord Denny. Hay was a favourite of King James I, and had been a masquer in Hymenaei the previous year. As Hay was from a Scottish family, the wedding at court was framed as an event to celebrate the Union of the Crowns and plans for a closer political union.

The intricate politics of the Stuart Court decreed some key differences between the two events; while the bill for Hymenaei was paid by King James, the expenses of the masque for Lord Hay were covered by the powerful Howard and Cecil families. The principal masquers were led by Theophilus Howard, Lord Walden, the son and heir of the Earl of Suffolk. James's queen consort, Anne of Denmark, was antipathetic to the Howards and she sat out the masque, claiming illness. Partially as a result, the documentary record on Lord Hay's Masque is thinner than for some other Court masques of the era.

== The masque ==
Jones's design for the masque had a sylvan theme, centered on a Grove of Diana with nine golden trees, flanked by a Bower of Flora on the right and a House of Night on the left. One scene featured artificial owls and bats flying around the set on wires. The nine gold trees moved and danced and split apart to reveal the nine principal masquers (the trees then sank into the stage below, at a touch from Night's wand). The masquers, dressed in carnation and cloth of silver and initially concealed in green and silver leaves, were nine knights of Apollo, and the torchbearers were the nine Hours of the night.

== The music ==
The masque was richly supplied with music, created by several composers – including Campion himself, who contributed two "airs" for songs and a dance. The published text indicates that the music was played by a "consort of twelve," violins with three lutes, a "consort of ten" that included harpsichord, bandora, sackbut, and two violins as well as lutes, and a group of cornets. A few details of the musical arrangements have survived, including the fact that at least one song was sung by a doubled set of voices, with a treble and bass situated near the King and another set of singers on the stage, "so that the words of the song might be heard of all."

== Cast ==
The nine knights of Apollo were: Lord Walden, Sir Thomas Howard, Sir Henry Cary Master of the Jewel House, Sir Richard Preston, Sir John Ashley, Sir Thomas Jarret, Sir John Digby, Sir Thomas Badger Master of the King's Harriers, Master Goring.

== Publication ==
Campion's text was entered into the Stationers' Register on 26 January 1607 and was published in quarto shortly after, printed by John Windet for the bookseller John Browne. Campion's verses conjoin the personal and political, hailing the marriage of Hay and Denny and looking forward to a day when English/Scottish intermarriage will produce a new "British" citizen.

== Aftermath ==
Such political and social import is a heavy load to lay on a new marriage. Within two years the couple were facing difficulties. Honoria was supposedly unfaithful and Hay was jealous; he broke open her cabinets in search of love letters and threatened her servants. Lady Mary Wroth exploited their troubles in Urania, her prose roman à clef about Stuart high society.

== See also ==
- The Lords' Masque, an alternative name for The Somerset Masque, also known as The Squire's Masque.

== Sources ==
- Barroll, John Leeds. Anna of Denmark, Queen of England: A Cultural Biography. Philadelphia, University of Pennsylvania Press, 2001.
- Cerasano, S. P., and Marion Wynne-Davies. Gloriana's Face: Women, Public and Private, in the English Renaissance. Detroit, Wayne State University Press, 1992.
- Chambers, E. K. The Elizabethan Stage. 4 Volumes, Oxford, Clarendon Press, 1923.
- Leapman, Michael. Inigo: The Troubled Life of Inigo Jones, Architect of the English Renaissance. London, Headline Book Publishing, 2003.
- Lindley, David. Thomas Campion. Leiden, Brill Academic Publishers, 1986.
- Walls, Peter. Music in the English Courtly Masque, 1604–1640. Oxford, Clarendon Press, 1996.
