= James Hay, 1st Earl of Carlisle =

British noble

The Right Honourable James Hay KG KB PC
- Earl of Carlisle
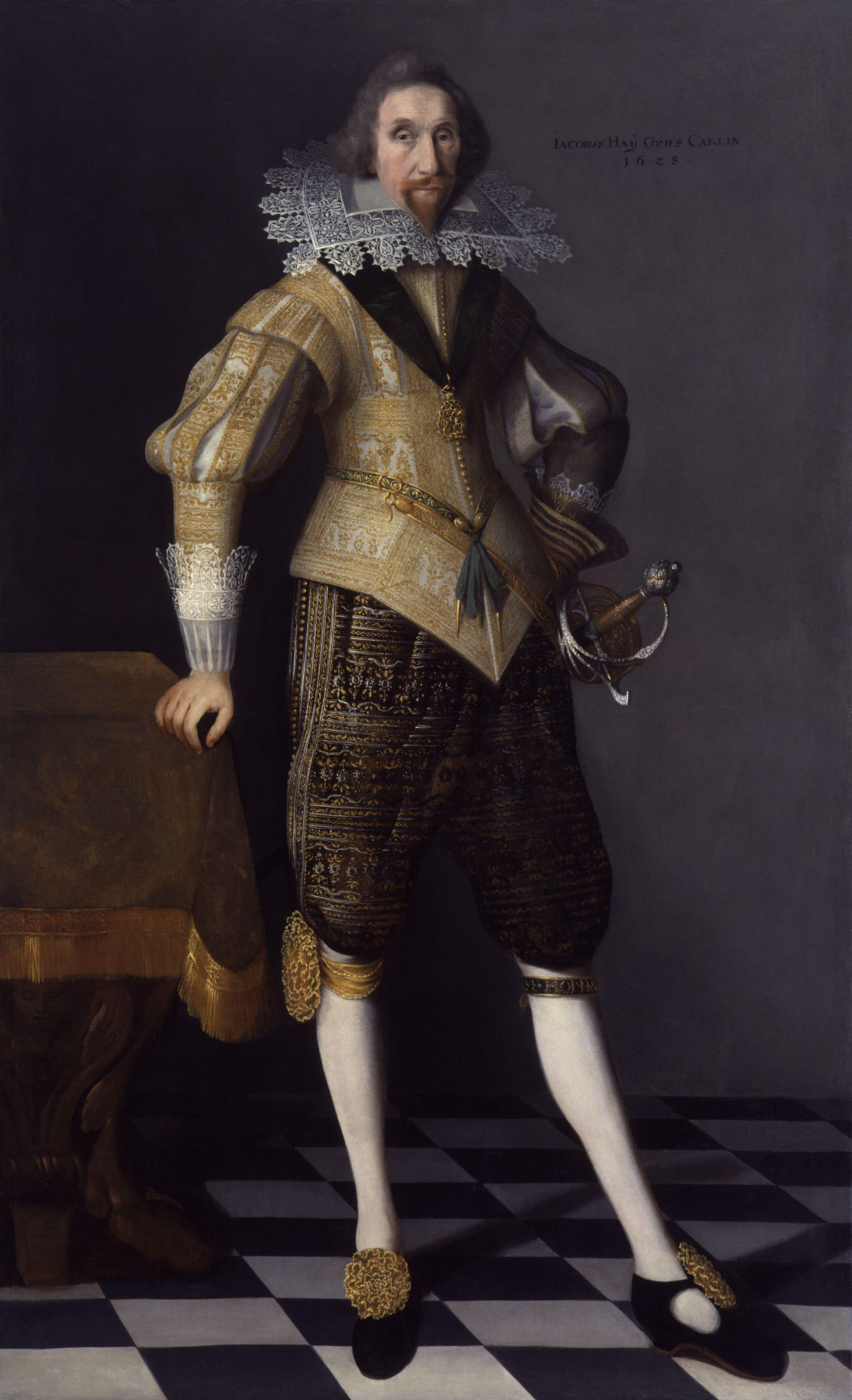

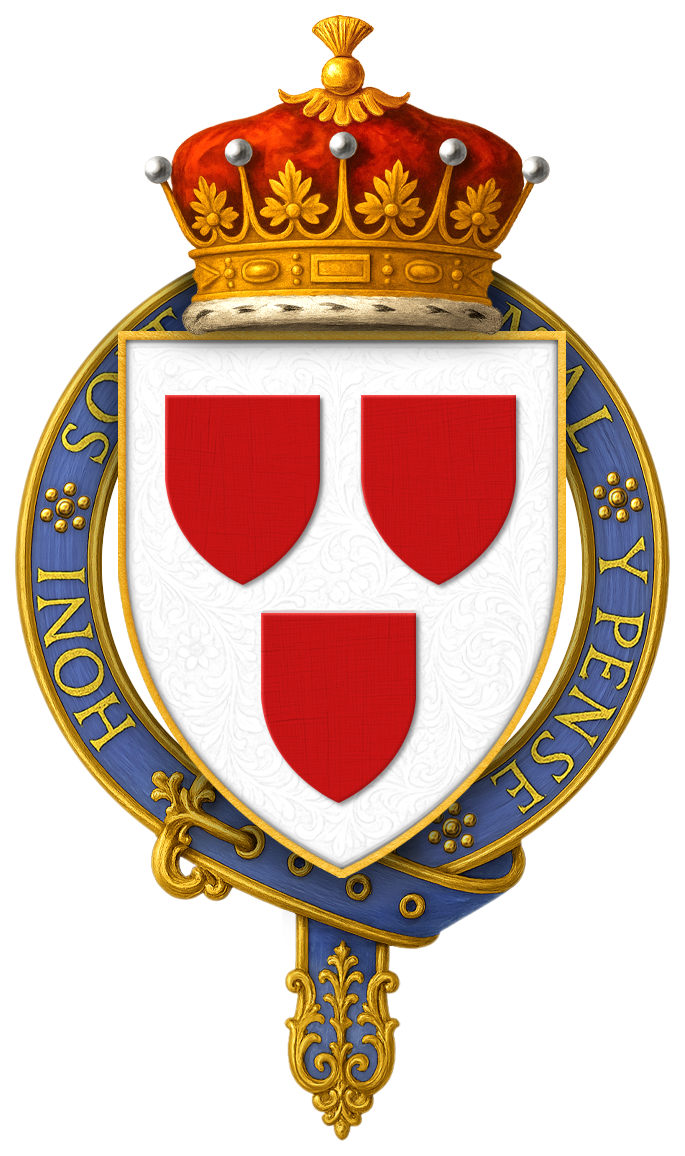
- Coat of arms
- Tenure: 1606–1636 (Lord Hay); 1618–1636 (Viscount Doncaster); 1622–1636 (Earl of Carlisle)
- Predecessor: New creation
- Successor: James Hay, 2nd Earl of Carlisle
- Spouses: Honora Denny (m. 1607; died 1614) Lady Lucy Percy (m. 1617)
- Issue: Lady Anne Hay; James Hay, 2nd Earl of Carlisle

James Hay, 1st Earl of Carlisle KG KB PC (c. 1580 – March 1636) was a Scottish courtier and English nobleman.

== Life ==
He was the son of Sir James Hay of Fingask, second son of Peter Hay 3rd of Megginch (a branch member of Hay of Leys, a younger branch of the Erroll family) and his wife Margaret, daughter of Crichton of Ruthven. His mother was Margaret Murray, cousin of George Hay, afterwards 1st Earl of Kinnoull.

His aunts married well, and he had two well-regarded uncles. His uncle Peter Hay of Megginch married Margaret Ogilvie, daughter of Sir Patrick Ogilvie of Inch, and are the ancestors of the later Earls of Kinnoull via their son, his first cousin Peter of Kirklands of Megginch. His uncle Edmund Hay was Professor of Scots Law at Douay.

He was knighted and taken into favour by James VI of Scotland, brought into England in 1603, treated as a "prime favourite" and made a gentleman of the bedchamber. In 1604, he was sent on a mission to France and pleaded for the Huguenots, which annoyed Henry IV of France and caused a substantial reduction of the present made to the English envoy. On 21 June 1606, he was created by patent a baron for life with precedence next to the barons, but without a place or voice in Parliament, no doubt to render his advancement less unpalatable to the English lords.

The king bestowed on him numerous grants, paid his debts, and secured for him a rich bride in the person of Honora Denny, only daughter and heir of Edward, Lord Denny. Their marriage was celebrated by Lord Hay's Masque, staged on 6 January 1607. On 9 February 1608 he performed in the masque The Hue and Cry After Cupid at Whitehall Palace as a sign of the zodiac, to celebrate the wedding of John Ramsay, Viscount Haddington to Elizabeth Radclyffe. In 1610 he was made a Knight of the Bath, and in 1613 master of the wardrobe. He danced in The Somerset Masque on 26 December 1613. In 1615 he was created Lord Hay of Sawley, and took his seat in the House of Lords.

Honora, Lady Hay was favourite of Anne of Denmark and they enjoyed the company of a Venetian diplomat and musician Giulio Muscorno. Muscorno quarrelled with the ambassador Antonio Foscarini and it was said that the queen and Lady Hay promoted Muscorno's cause. Honora, Lady Hay died in 1614 and was buried on 16 August at Waltham Abbey.

Hay was sent to France in 1616 to negotiate the marriage of Princess Christina with Prince Charles. Before he left London news arrived that the French fashion in clothing had changed and his outfits would have to be remade. Lady Haddington made a joke about his companions, that there were three mignards; himself, Sir Henry Rich and Sir George Goring, three dancers; Sir Gilbert Hawten, John Auchmoutie, and Abercromby, and three fools or buffoons; Sir Thomas German, Sir Ralph Shelton, and Sir Thomas Badger. On his return, being now a widower, he was made a Privy Councillor.

In February 1617 he presented a masque by Ben Jonson, Lovers Made Men, to the French ambassador Baron de Tour at his house in London. The performance was staged by the Countess of Bedford and said to have cost £2200. Later that year, he married Lady Lucy Percy (1599–1660), daughter of Henry Percy, 9th Earl of Northumberland (the famous "Wizard Earl"), by his wife Dorothy Devereux.

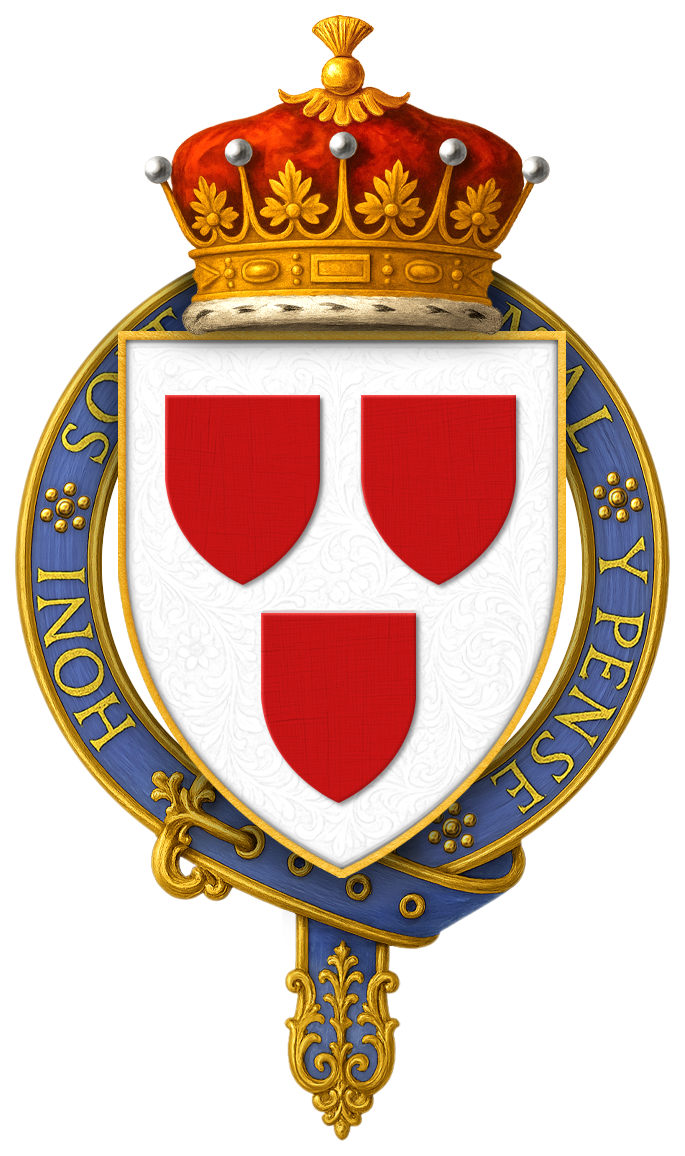
The coat of arms of Sir James Hay, 1st Earl of Carlisle, KG

In 1618 he resigned the mastership of the wardrobe for a large sum in compensation. He was created Viscount Doncaster, and in February 1619 was despatched on a mission to Germany, where during the beginning Thirty Years' War he identified himself with the cause of the "Winter King", Elector Frederick V of the Palatinate, and urged James to make war in his support. In 1621 and 1622 he was sent to France to obtain peace for the Huguenots from Louis XIII, in which he was unsuccessful, and in September 1622 was created Earl of Carlisle.

Next year he went to Paris on the occasion of Prince Charles's journey to Madrid, and again in 1624 to join Henry Rich, afterwards Lord Holland, in negotiating the prince's marriage with Henrietta Maria, when he advised James without success to resist Richelieu's demands on the subject of religious toleration. In 1624 he was made a knight of the Order of the Garter. Charles's marriage in 1625 was by proxy, so the wedding contract was signed by Carlisle and Holland. The king's representative at the actual wedding was the duke of Chevreuse, yet Carlisle and Holland acted as witnesses.

Carlisle became gentleman of the bedchamber to King Charles I after his accession. In 1628, after the failure of the expedition to Rhe, he was sent to make a diversion against Cardinal Richelieu in Lorraine and Piedmont; he counselled peace with Spain and the vigorous prosecution of the war with France, but on his return home found his advice neglected. He took no further part in public life, and died in March 1636.

Carlisle was a man of good sense and of accommodating temper, with some diplomatic ability. His extravagance and lavish expenditure, his double suppers and costly entertainments, were the theme of satirists and wonder of society, and his debts were said at his death to amount to more than £80,000. A lavish banquet for the French ambassador in 1621 at Essex House involved sweetmeats costing £500 and ambergris used in cooking costing £300, and the total bill was £3,300.

Clarendon said he left a reputation of a very fine gentleman and a most accomplished courtier, and after having spent, in a very jovial life, above £400,000, which upon a strict computation he received from the crown, he left not a house or acre of land to be remembered by.

== Colonial proprietor ==
Hay by 1612 was a director of the Virginia Company. He was a patentee and councillor of the plantation of New England, and showed great interest in the colonies.

Carlise also had an interest in the Caribbean. There James Ley, 1st Earl of Marlborough was a rival, who had to be bought off. Another rival was the Earl of Montgomery. On 2 July 1627 Carlisle obtained from the king a grant of all the Caribbean Islands, including Barbados, this being a confirmation of a former concession given by James I. A colonial plantation venture on Barbados was led in 1628 by Marmaduke Roydon, a prominent City of London merchant and one of Carlisle's major creditors.

== Family ==
Hay's first wife was Honoria Denny. His second wife, Lucy Hay, Countess of Carlisle, was involved in many conspiracies, or allegations thereof, during the English Civil War.

The first earl was succeeded by James, his only surviving son by his first wife. James married Margaret Russell, third daughter of Francis Russell, 4th Earl of Bedford, but James died without issue on 30 October 1660. At his death, the peerage became extinct in the Hay family.

== Notes ==
Peerage of England
New creation	Earl of Carlisle; 1622–1636	Succeeded by James Hay
New creation	Viscount Doncaster; 1618–1636	Succeeded by James Hay
Peerage of Scotland
New creation	Lord Hay; 1606–1636	Succeeded by James Hay
