= Early modern glass in England =

Glass production in England (c. 1500–1800)

The early modern period in England (c. 1500–1800) brought on a revival in local glass production. Medieval glass had been limited to the small-scale production of forest glass for window glass and vessels, predominantly in the Weald. The organisation of production evolved from the small-scale family-run glass houses typical of forest glass-making to large monopolies granted by the Crown. The influx of immigrants from Europe brought changes in furnace technology and raw materials, creating a better quality glass. Monastic decrees later banned the use of wood fuel which was then replaced by the less expensive alternative of coal. The development of lead glass in the late 17th century propelled England to the forefront of the glass industry and paved the way for advancements in the Industrial Revolution.

== Chemical composition ==
Glass has three major components: a network former (silica), a network modifier (flux), and a network stabilizer (predominantly lime). In the early 16th and 17th centuries glassmaking (the manufacture of glass from raw materials) and glassworking (the creation of objects from glass) occurred within the same glasshouse. Glass was also recycled at this time in the form of cullet.

In the early modern era, network formers were obtained from fine or coarse sands which were usually located near the area of production or from silica based pebbles.

Network modifiers were used to alter the chemical composition of the network former and reduce the melting temperature of the batch. These fluxes varied depending on the type of glass. Potassium oxide (K_{2}O) based alkalis were used extensively in glass production.

The type of flux selected heavily influenced the quality of the glass produced. In England, beech wood and oak were preferred for forest glass. For soda-lime glass (Na_{2}O), alkalis were often found in the form of marine plants – either local kelp or imported plants from the Mediterranean and the Near East (barilla, polverine, rochetta, Sevonus, natron).

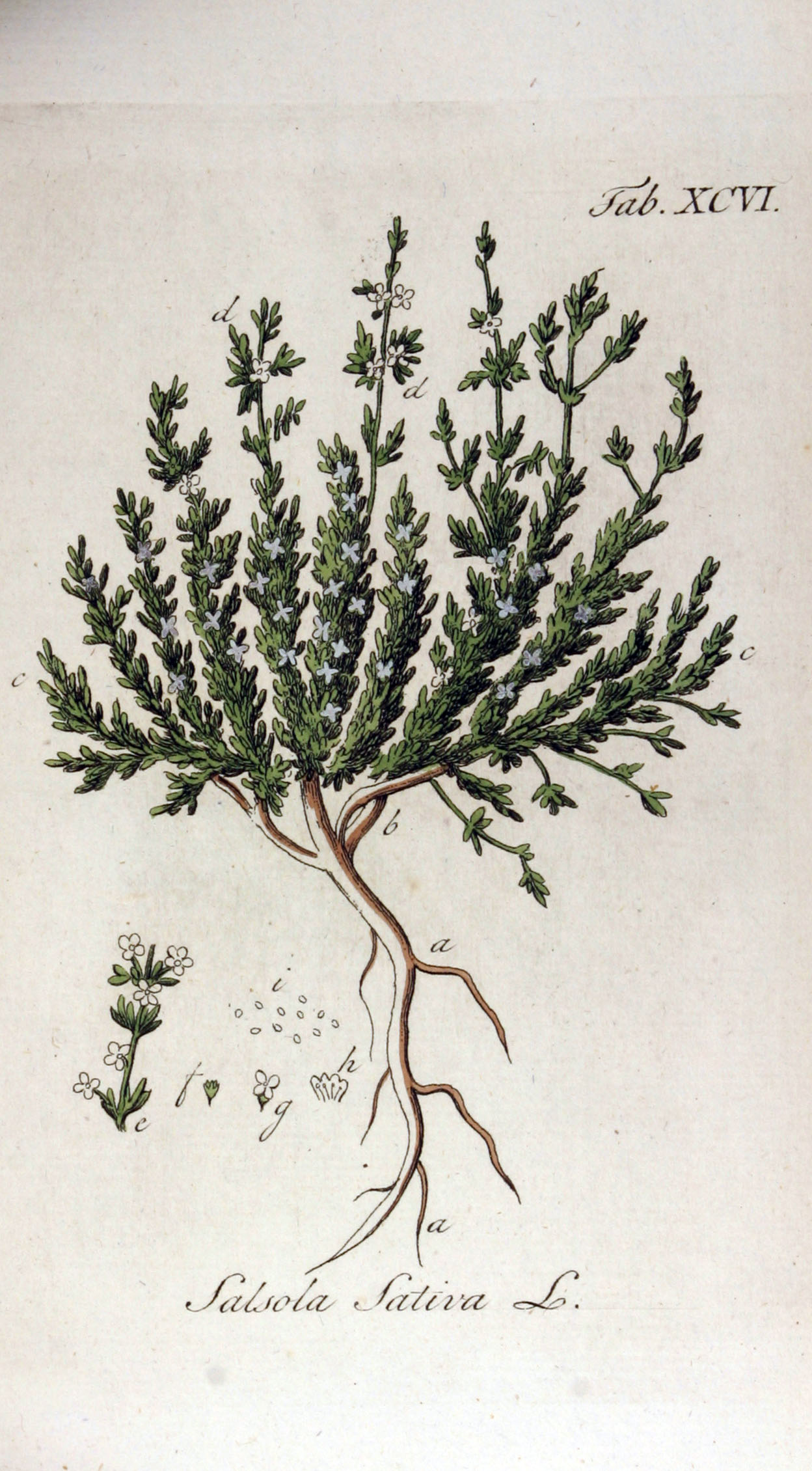
Halogeton sativus is one of the plants from which barilla was made. The species was formerly classified as Salsola sativa. Engraving published 1813 (Adolphus Ypey).

These were often used for the production of 'white' crystallo glass, a colourless glass or façon de venise, colourless glass of the highest quality.

Network stabilizers in early modern England continued to be lime sources. Lime occurs as a natural contaminant in most sands, and may also be intentionally added to the melt.

=== Compositional groups ===
Five glass compositional groups have been identified through analysis of archaeologically recovered glass from this period. These have been further reduced into two types, ‘green glass’ and ‘white glass’. The groups include:

- Potash-lime-silica glass (forest or green glass), typically has an excess of 10% wt oxide K^{2}0
- High lime low alkali (green glass) usually has <10% Na_{2}O, K_{2}O, 15-20% CaO
- Soda-lime glass (white glass/‘ordinary glass’) with low MgO, CaO, high K_{2}O
- Mixed alkali glass (white glass/crystallo) Na_{2}O K_{2}O and CaO levels are too low for this glass to be incorporated in the other categories.
- Lead glass (white glass/ façon de venise) has on average 25-35% PbO

The following table represents the mean compositional data derived from the analysis of materials at the Old Broad Street furnace in London, dated to the early 17th century. and those recovered from Phase Two (circa 1680-1700 AD) Silkstone, Yorkshire This information was gathered from Dungworth's compilation and analysis The data is represented in wt% oxides and those below the detection limits (0.2% or less) are shown by '-'.

Site	Type	Na_{2}0	MgO	Al_{2}O_{3}	SiO_{2}	P_{2}0_{5}	SO_{3}	Cl	K_{2}O	CaO	TiO_{2}	MnO	Fe_{2}O_{3}	SrO	PbO
Old Broad St	Potash	2.5	6.5	1.4	54.7	3.7	0.07	0.19	11.8	14.5	0.30	1.10	0.92	-	-
s.d.		1.1	1.2	0.3	3.3	0.4	0.05	0.03	1.3	2.4	0.10	0.23	0.23	-	-
Old Broad St	HLLA	3.0	3.7	3.3	57.9	3.2	0.33	0.26	4.6	20.7	0.32	0.52	1.43	-	-
s.d.		1.6	1.0	1.8	3.9	1.0	0.28	0.18	1.7	2.0	0.07	0.49	0.52	-	-
Silkstone phase 2	HLLA	1.1	5.1	4.5	52.5	3.1	0.3	0.3	8.5	21.4	0.3	0.9	2.1	0.06	<0.3
s.d.		0.2	0.8	0.8	3.8	0.7	0.1	0.1	0.9	1.8	0.1	0.5	0.4	0.02	-
Old Broad St	Soda-Lime-Silica	12.2	3.9	1.0	68.6	0.34	0.10	0.35	2.4	10.1	0.07	0.49	0.52	-	-
s.d.		1.0	0.7	0.3	2.4	0.15	0.02	0.05	0.3	1.8	0.08	0.64	0.27	-	-
Old Broad St	Mixed Alkali	6.0	5.3	2.6	63.5	1.7	0.2	0.7	3.6	15.2	n.d.	0.2	0.2	-	-
s.d.		0.9	0.4	0.4	1.4	0.6	0.1	0.2	0.6	2.2	-	0.2	0.2	-	
-
Silkstone Phase 2	Mixed Alkali	6.9	2.9	1.4	68.3	0.3	0.1	0.5	6.6	10.5	<0.1	1.0	1.0	0.05	<0.3
s.d.		0.4	0.1	0.3	1.9	0.3	0.1	0.1	0.2	1.6	-	0.1	0.2	0.01	
Silkstone Phase 2	Lead glass	<.05	<0.3	0.5	53.8	<0.2	<0.2	<0.1	13.2	<0.1	<0.1	<0.1	0.1	<0.02	32.0
s.d.		-	-	0.1	0.8	-	-	-	0.6	-	-	-	0.1	-	0.8

=== Colorants ===
There are numerous factors that may influence colouration during glass production. These include contaminants in raw materials, furnace conditions, and deliberate additives that would provide known colour variations.

Iron existing as a contaminant in sands, produced either a green or brown colour depending upon the oxidation state. Coal fumes provided a carbon contaminant, which could create a dark brown or black colour. Manganese present in wood ash may have contributed to the lighter, translucent green colour. Other trace elements present in alkalis (such as MnO in beech ash) undoubtedly influenced the finished product.

Other metal oxide colorants were known from earlier periods in antiquity.

== Early post-medieval glass ==
Medieval glasshouse traditions continued in the Weald, which was becoming deforested by the early 17th century; local glassmaking spread elsewhere, where timber was available to fire furnaces, to Hampshire, Gloucestershire, North Staffordshire and the Scottish Borders. At Bagot's Park, Staffordshire, one such glasshouse has been recovered, which dates from circa 1535; it contained an early melting furnace and a smaller annealing furnace. The melting furnace had two siege benches for the placement of three crucible pots, each with a central flue cut into the floor to create a draught that would allow the furnace to achieve 1200 °C in order to melt the glass. Fritting, and the preheating of crucibles may have occurred in the upper areas of the main furnace. Annealing (glass) and glass blowing probably occurred using a smaller furnace. Cullet heaps of broken glass residue were found on either side, suggesting the use of a flux to reduce melting temperatures. Some crushed white pebbles were recovered in the bottom of pots, and this may reflect the silica source used at this site. The glass recovered from Bagot's Park was badly weathered, yet the ends of broad glass and crown glass suggest that window and vessel glass were produced.

=== Glass technology ===
The majority of glass at this time was blown or mould blown into a variety of vessel shapes. This was enhanced by decorative styles, including optic decoration and trailing the glass, sometimes with pre-fabricated glass canes, to replicate Venetian traditions. In glass tank furnace we generally used AZS block in bottom section.

== Influences from the Continent ==
In 1567, Jean Carré arrived in London from Antwerp and obtained a crown-sanctioned patent for the production of window glass. This patent was awarded to Carré on the condition that prices remained low and that glassmaking and blowing would be taught to native Englishmen to promote the craft. He brought many Venetian craftsmen to his London workshop and opened a second furnace outside the city to produce vessel and green glass.

Later in 1574, Jacob Verzelini, a Venetian who worked for Carré was granted a monopoly over Venetian-style vessel glass. This effectively banned most of the imports from Venice and promoted glass made locally in England. Verzelini's goal was to produce clear crystallo glass as well as decorative glass façon de venise ("in the Venetian mode"), which he achieved by importing barilla from Spain. This effectively helped to lower the price of clear glassware and made it available to a wider range of the gentry and middle class.

Utilitarian green glass production remained on a small scale and was made by numerous glasshouses in different areas for local consumption, in the tradition of forest glass.

=== Technological changes ===
With the new influx of immigrants from the European Continent in the mid-16th century, technological changes affected the quality of English glass. This was possibly the combined result of experience and the selection/importation of purer raw materials.

=== Winged furnaces ===
Additionally, glass furnaces constructed from the mid-16th century began to reflect continental styles. This trend, identifiable in the archaeological record, supports the documentary evidence for immigrant glassmakers. Wing-like additions were added to the late 16th–early 17th century furnace remains at two glass producing sites, Hutton and Rosedale in York, as well as at Vann Copse in the Weald. The Hutton furnace had two wings added in the northeast and southeast corners of the original rectangular melting furnace. A smaller nearby furnace was abandoned around the same time as the addition of the wings, suggesting that they provided an area for either annealing or pre-heating pots.

Rosedale and Vann Copse were constructed in similar styles but with four wings, one in each corner, which were built integral to the original furnace. The wings showed evidence of heating which again suggested these were areas for fritting or glassworking. The glass produced at Rosedale was generally cleaner and of a better quality than that of Hutton, although the reasons for this are still unclear. Production at Rosedale appeared to have a higher output than that of Hutton, as two additional smaller furnaces indicate that the operation had expanded. It is thought that these furnaces are similar to those of the Lorraine style, and research in Belgium suggests that contemporary continental furnaces were made in this fashion.

== Change to coal ==
From 1581–1584, Parliament became increasingly concerned over the wood supply in the country. At this time, a large number of high temperature industries were dependent on wood for fuel, and this began to diminish the country's forests. The original decree in this time prohibited the use of wood fuel unless it was from one’s own land. By 1609, Sir Edward Zouche was granted a patent to experiment with coal as the main fuel for a furnace at Winchester and by 1615 Parliament had banned the use of wood fuel.

Adopting coal as the main source of fuel created numerous problems for glass production. Burning coal produced short flames which shifted the location of the hearth from the far ends of the furnace to the center. Air draughts are also necessary to create a regenerative heating system for glass melting. Early coal furnaces, such as at Bolsterstone, contain underground flues to provide an easy way to remove ash. Additionally, the carbon from the coal fumes contaminated the glass in the uncovered pots which created a dark and often uneven colour. Lids, such as those found at Bolsterstone, needed to be implemented to prevent these impurities. Glass bottles from this initial transition are often dark in color.

== Sir Robert Mansell ==
Before 1616, Sir Robert Mansell bought out the patent and company started by Zouche. He began many ventures and set up a successful glasshouse near a coal source in the attempts to save money and to more easily meet the demands of London. His crystallo furnace at Broad Street, London, had fared successfully. Some of his earlier attempts to set up new a furnace to produce glass for the growing needs of London failed, as transportation costs proved to be too high. Yet the furnace Mansell set up at Newcastle was successful.

Patents in 1614 favoured the use of Scottish coal. A winged furnace was set up at Kimmeridge using local sources of oil shale as fuel. Unlike other wing furnaces, the one at this site had deep flues and a centrally located hearth, illustrating the adaptation to a new fuel source. This furnace was demolished in 1623 as being in violation of Mansell’s monopoly.

== Conical furnaces ==
The conical glasshouses of England of the late 17th century introduced to furnaces the use of a chimney and a new plan shape. This development possibly drew off the idea of earlier wind furnaces and the beehive-shaped Venetian style furnaces, known only from historical documents in England. The addition of the chimney both created a strong draught and acted to extract the coal fumes. The earliest examples appear in Bristol and at Gawber, Yorkshire.

These furnaces had underground flues and chimneys with air holes to provide a strong air draught to control heat. Fritting, pre-heating pots and annealing processes were undertaken in different sections of the furnace, elevated above the heat source.

== Expansion of the industry ==
Around 1663, George Ravenscroft developed flint glass, a colourless and translucent glass with many desirable working properties. The original recipe was subject to crizzling. Later batches had the addition of lead oxide (PbO) which combatted this problem and produced a superior glass that was more suitable for to engraving and etching. Lead glass was widely adopted by the Glass seller’s guild when Ravenscroft’s patent expired.

Lead glass helped to propel England to the front of the glass industry. Bottles for wine and phials began to be produced and exported on a large scale. The archaeological remains of the Albion shipwreck off Margate in 1765 contained 11 lead glass ingots, which are thought to be meant for trade with China. Although little is known about these materials, it does suggest that lead glass contributed to England's exports.

The 19th century brought new developments with synthetic materials, such as gas fuel. Additionally, continuous melting production with tank furnaces helped mark the end of the early modern period and the beginning of the Industrial Revolution.

== English glass objects ==
=== Vessel glass ===
The evolution of vessel glass became more elaborate and specific to its intended use throughout the early modern period. Mirror glass and glass objects also began to be produced on larger scales during the early modern period. Types of objects include:

- Phials
- Goblets
- Drinking glasses
- Beakers
- Tankards
- Jugs
- Bottles
- Bowls
- Jars
- Urinals
- Flasks
- Mirror glass

=== Window glass ===
Window glass was produced throughout the period on a small scale, in the form of crown glass and broad glass. This was predominantly made from green glass throughout the 16th century. While rare in the early 16th century, glass windows soon became a symbol of increasing wealth and status. Larger sheets were in demand for domestic and public buildings.

=== Stained glass ===
Stained glass in the earliest part of the early modern period was imported into England from France. With the Protestant Reformation in England, ecclesiastic buildings increasingly used the more expensive 'white' glass.
