= Edward Zouch =

English actor (died 1634)

Sir Edward Zouch of Woking (died 1634) was a courtier to English kings James and Charles I, a masque actor, and Knight Marshal of the King's Household.

He was the son of Sir Willam Zouch or Zouche. His mother's name is not known.

== Career ==
=== Marriages ===
He first married Eleanor Brittayne in 1598. His second wife was Elizabeth Middlemore, a sister of Anne of Denmark's maid of honour Mary Middlemore.

In 1612 he married Dorothy Silking, a Danish chamberer in the bedchamber of Anne of Denmark from Güstrow. The queen gave her and her sister Jyngell Silken gifts of clothes as a mark of favour. In 1635 Reverend George Garrard, who had been at court in the household of Prince Henry, recalled that Silken was a "homely woman" and Zouch had married her for her money. The jeweller George Heriot recorded in his accounts for 1613 that the "Lady Sutch" owed him £81 which "she affirmes her Majesty is pleased to paye".

=== Glass making ===
From 1609 to 1618 Zouch was involved in glass-making, especially at Vauxhall glassworks. He built a glasshouse at Lambeth with Louis Thelwall, fuelled by Scottish coal, which was inspected by Sir George More and Sir Edmund Bowyer In July 1613. The glass patents were discussed in the parliament of 1614. He sold his interest to Sir Robert Mansell, whose wife Elizabeth Roper had also been in the household of Anne of Denmark.

John Aubrey recorded a story that Zouch had obtained the patent for glass-making at the expense of William Robson, by making the king laugh with this verse;

Severn, Humber, Trent, and Thames,
And thy great Ocean and her streames
Must putt downe Robson and his fires
Or downe goes Zouche and his desires.

In 1613 Zouch sent the lawyer James Whitelocke a doe (female deer) from Woking as a Christmas present. The King sent a present of silver plate worth £150 to the christening of his son James in 1615.

=== A play at Theobalds ===
As a gentleman of the Privy Chamber, Zouch attended the king on his visit to Scotland in 1617, being made a burgess of the guild of Aberdeen.

In January 1618 he acted with other courtiers at Theobalds led by Sir John Finet in an interlude featuring "Tom of Bedlam the Tinker" intended to amuse the king who was suffering from gout. The cast included: Thomas Dutton, Thomas Badger, George Goring, Thomas Tyringham, Robert Yaxley, William Uvedale, Arthur Lake, and George Garret. The King was displeased by the play, especially the lyrics sung or written by Finet, and John Chamberlain was surprised that "none had the judgement to see how unfit it was to bring such beastly gear in public before a prince". John Bingley was knighted on this occasion.

A later 17th-century version of the story places these entertainments at an earlier date, associated with the rise of George Villiers, 1st Duke of Buckingham as a royal favourite. Zouch, Goring and Finet were described as the king's "chief and Master Fools", who regularly entertained King James. Zouch was noted for singing "bawdy songs". The games included David Drummond and Archibald Armstrong riding piggy-back to joust.

=== Knight Marshall ===
In October 1618 he bought the Knight Marshallship from Sir Thomas Vavasour for £3000 with the aid of a gift of £1500 from the king. Anne Clifford noted that Zouch was responsible at the queen's funeral for the burial of Anne of Denmark in the Henry VII Chapel at Westminster Abbey at 7 o'clock at night on 13 May 1619.

On 5 August Zouch acted in a comedy for the king at Salisbury in character as a "bearward" or keeper of bears, probably in "the house of Mr Sadler". On 28 August 1620 Zouch wrote to his cousin Lord Zouch of Odiham that he intended to offer King James and Prince Charles more mirth in their forthcoming visit to Woking than the Bishop of Winchester would at Farnham, with masques every night. This approach was a success for Zouch, and John Chamberlain reported "Yet hard as the world goes, Sir Edward Zouch, knight marshall, hath Oking with another lordship adjoining to it, in all better than £500 a year, lately given him in fee-farme for masking and fooling." These theatricals were recorded in Anthony Weldon's satirical account of James's court; "Zouch his part to sing bawdy songs, and tell bawdy tales, Finet's to compose these songs".

=== Woking ===
Edward Zouch was made steward of Woking Manor or Palace and keeper of the park on 9 May 1609. In June 1609 Simon Basil, the surveyor of the royal works came to Woking to estimate costs for repairs to the manor, office houses, and two bridges. Zouch asked Basil to make an estimate for cleaning out the moat and building a new bridge over the river at the front of the house. This would increase the privacy of the king's garden. King James was a frequent visitor to Woking, often coming in the month of March.

In 1620 Zouch was appointed keeper of Woking Palace. He built a house nearby called Hoe Bridge Place with a free-standing tower. In November 1620 Zouch was given the manors of Woking, Bagshot, and Chobham, with the proviso that he should return the service of carrying the first dish to the king's table and pay £100. He was also Forester of Woking. John Chamberlain wrote that Zouch had "Oking" and other lands worth £500 yearly for his "fooling and masking".

After an inventory of the late queen's silver plate at Denmark House was taken in 1621, the Zouches were asked to supply a shortfall worth £492-19s., including a gold casting bottle engraved with the queen's arms. Zouch successfully claimed that a warrant signed by Dorothy Silking was a forgery, because she could not write her name. At least three examples of Dorothy's signature survive today.

Zouch donated a panelled oak gallery to St Peter's Church in Old Woking in 1622, his name is painted across its architrave. King James stayed at Woking with Zouch at the start of September 1624. He hunted towards Busbridge, and wrote to the Duke of Buckingham that he would stay longer, "so earnest I am to kill more of Zouch's great stags."

=== Reign of Charles I ===
After the death of James VI and I, Zouch proclaimed King Charles at the gate of Theobalds. According to James Howell, Zouche mistakenly proclaimed Charles the "dubitable heir" at Theobalds. He was corrected by Secretary Conway. Howell included this story in a letter to his father, printed in his Epistolae Ho-Elianae.

Zouch resigned his office of Knight Marshall in February 1626, and Charles I gave it to Edmund Verney. In 1630 Zouch sued Sir William Bulstrode and his wife, the widow of the goldsmith and member of Parliament Henry Banister, for jewels which he had pawned in 1624, but it was discovered that Zouch had sold them to Banister in 1626.

In 1625 his cousin Edward, Lord Zouche, bequeathed Bramshill House to him, "he being of my blood and the son of him I loved best in my life, except the Lord Gray of Wilton."

Edward Zouch died on 7 June 1634. There is a Latin memorial inscription to Zouch placed by his wife in St Peter's Church at Old Woking, noting his court position as "Marescalli Aulici", or "Marshall of the Household".

After his death, an inventory was taken of Bramshill House, where the library contained 250 books and "certain mathematical instruments". His son James sold Bramshill in 1637 and his furniture was valued at £2762-5s-3d.

== Family ==
Edward Zouch and Dorothy Silking had the following children;

- James Zouch (1615-1643) married Beatrice Annesley, daughter of Francis Annesley, 1st Viscount Valentia. She was a niece of Bridget Annesley, a companion to Dorothy Silking in Anne of Denmark's bedchamber. James had accompanied her brother Arthur while on his Grand Tour.
- Sophia Zouch (1618-1691), who married in 1635 Edward Cecil, 1st Viscount Wimbledon. Her father's friend John Finet made a satirical comment on their age difference. Secondly she married Robert King of Boyle Abbey, County Roscommon, (d. 1657) and had issue. She was buried at Ketton, in Suffolk.

=== Chancery archive ===
James Zouch had married Beatrice Annesley in 1637, and after his death, she married Sir John Lloyd (d. 1664), while their son was still an infant. She married for the third time, Sir Thomas Smith of Hill Hall (d. 1668), according to a law case heard before the Lord Chancellor in 1669. The mother and son in the case were noted to be related to Arthur Annesley, 1st Earl of Anglesey. The case was brought by a creditor of Sir Edward Zouch called Gilpen, against his grandson or heirs. The case papers contain a copy of Edward Zouch's will and an inventory of goods at Bramshill.
