= Old Woking =

Coordinates: 51°18′18″N 0°32′20″W

- Ward
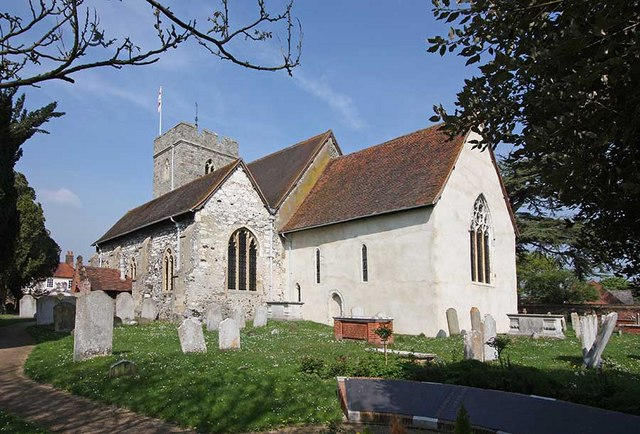
- St Peters Church, Old Woking

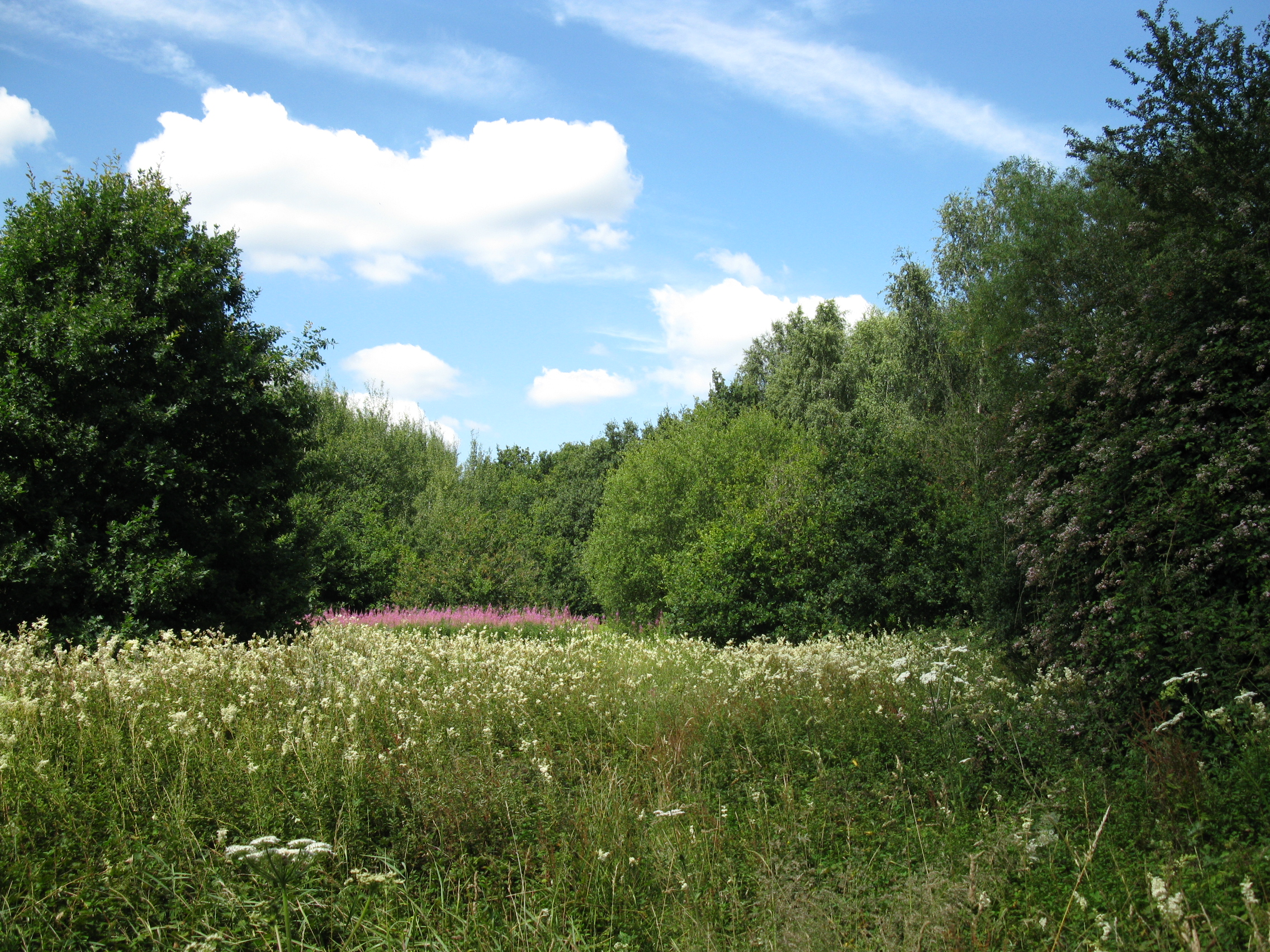
- The Hoe Valley after improvement in the Hoe Valley Scheme, is half within the ward and half within Mayford ward.

- Location within Surrey
- Area: 2.24 km^{2} (0.86 sq mi)
- Population: 3,192 (Census 2011. Ward)
  - Density: 1,425/km^{2} (3,690/sq mi)
- OS grid reference: TQ0257
- District: Woking
- Shire county: Surrey
- Region: South East
- Country: England
- Sovereign state: United Kingdom
- Post town: Woking
- Postcode district: GU22
- Dialling code: 01483
- Police: Surrey
- Fire: Surrey
- Ambulance: South East Coast
- UK Parliament: Woking

Old Woking is a ward and the original settlement of the town and borough of Woking, Surrey, about 1.3 miles (2.1 km) southeast of the modern town centre. It is bounded by the Hoe Stream to the north and the River Wey to the south and between Kingfield to the west and farmland to the east. The village has no dual carriageways or motorways, its main road is the A247, which connects Woking with Clandon Park and provides access to the A3. The village contains parts of Woking's two largest parks and two converted paper mills. The expanded village largely consists of semi-detached houses with gardens and covers an area of 224 hectares (550 acres).

To the east of Old Woking's developed cluster are the ruins of Woking Palace which was the local manor house and a royal dwelling throughout the Tudor dynasty.

== History ==
The village of Old Woking, though much rebuilt, predates the rest of Woking by over 1000 years and still contains many historic buildings; the Old Wokings Residents' Association architectural group has recorded over 100 buildings in St Peter's parish built before 1700. More than 50 buildings have been listed by English Heritage.

St Peter's Church is a grade I listed building, dating to the 12th century. Other significant buildings in the parish include Ye Olde Brew House, The Grange, London House, Sutton Place, Church Cottage, Hand and Spear, The Old House, The Old Vicarage, Fishers Farm, Hoe Place, The Old Manor House and Weylea.

=== Manor ===
Here Woking Palace was important as a main home of Margaret Beaufort, the pious and determined mother of Henry VII. His allied forces largely obtained through his mother's marriages and skilful negotiation won the Battle of Bosworth, killing the last king to have died in battle in Britain. It remained a royal residence throughout the Tudor period. However after Margaret's death it lost importance compared to the royal palaces of London, Oatlands Palace and Windsor Castle.

By 1911 only the foundations, stumps of walls and earthworks remained. These still provide visitors with evidence of its once extensive buildings, with two chapels, within a double moat. The double moat is shown in the survey by Norden of 1607, and the remains of what was the manor house are still visible at Woking Park Farm. The palace had a cornmill, a fulling-mill and a deer park.

It was Elizabeth I's own house in 1583. James VI and I, however, made a grant of it in 1620 to Sir Edward Zouch, who died in 1634. In 1715 following that family, the palace in some ruin already, and the vast manor estate around it was bought by John Walter. His son Abel sold it to Lord Onslow in 1752 in whose hands Old Woking remained until the Earls sold it off piecemeal, through the 19th and 20th centuries.

=== After the industrial revolution ===
For most of the 20th Century and earlier Old Woking was the commercial hub of Woking containing many large companies including the original factory of Kenwood Limited, manufacturer of kitchen appliances, notably the Kenwood Chef. Today the company is owned by DeLonghi. Harvey's Water Softeners is another example of a long-established manufacturing business in the area.

The village had a substantial automotive sector, specifically in repair and retail. Since the 1990s most industry, storage and assembling operations have declined in the village. Thames Water's treatment works to the east of the village have expanded in line with population. The main sites of the James Walker factory and the Gresham Press operated from the 1890s until the late 20th century. The printing works utilised two paper mills on the Wey. Both have been redeveloped into upmarket apartments.

== Amenities and Localities ==
=== Hoebridge ===
Hoe Bridge School and Hoebridge Golf Course are in Old Woking. Hoebridge usually informally describes the very small locality or neighbourhood in the east.

=== Elm Bridge Estate ===
A somewhat obscure, rarely marked name for the western network of residential roads, is the Elm Bridge Estate.

=== Nature reserves ===
Mill Moor, directly south of the High Street, is a nature reserve criss-crossed by paths. It is a Site of Nature Conservation Interest. To the north there are two nature reserves along the Hoe Stream, the White Rose Lane Nature Reserve, an area of alder woodlands, and the Mayford Meadows wetland habitat.

=== Woking Park ===
Woking Park has two leisure complexes, one with three types of pool, including a competition pool, two main playing fields to the far east and west and wooded garden walks. Since the early 21st century the Army Cadets, Sea Cadets and a boxing club have their headquarters in the park.

== Landmarks ==
=== St Peter's Church ===
The Anglican parish church is 50 yards (46 m) south of the main, relatively short east-west thoroughfare which forms the High Street, It is surrounded by a cluster of 17th and 18th centuries buildings around the small conservation area and very short Church Street. The west door of the church is the oldest door in Surrey and probably the third oldest in the country having been dated by dendrochronology to the reign of Henry I (1100–35). The four planks making up the door very likely came from a single tree which was over 270 years old when it was felled. The tree must have grown from an acorn which germinated in the reign of Egbert of England (802–39). Dr Jane Geddes, of the University of Aberdeen, has identified the door as one of only five picture doors in the country and the ironwork as medieval. The church is usually open after Easter in the summer months on Saturdays from 1 pm to 3 pm.

=== Former Saint Martha Printing Works ===
==== Unwin's Mill ====
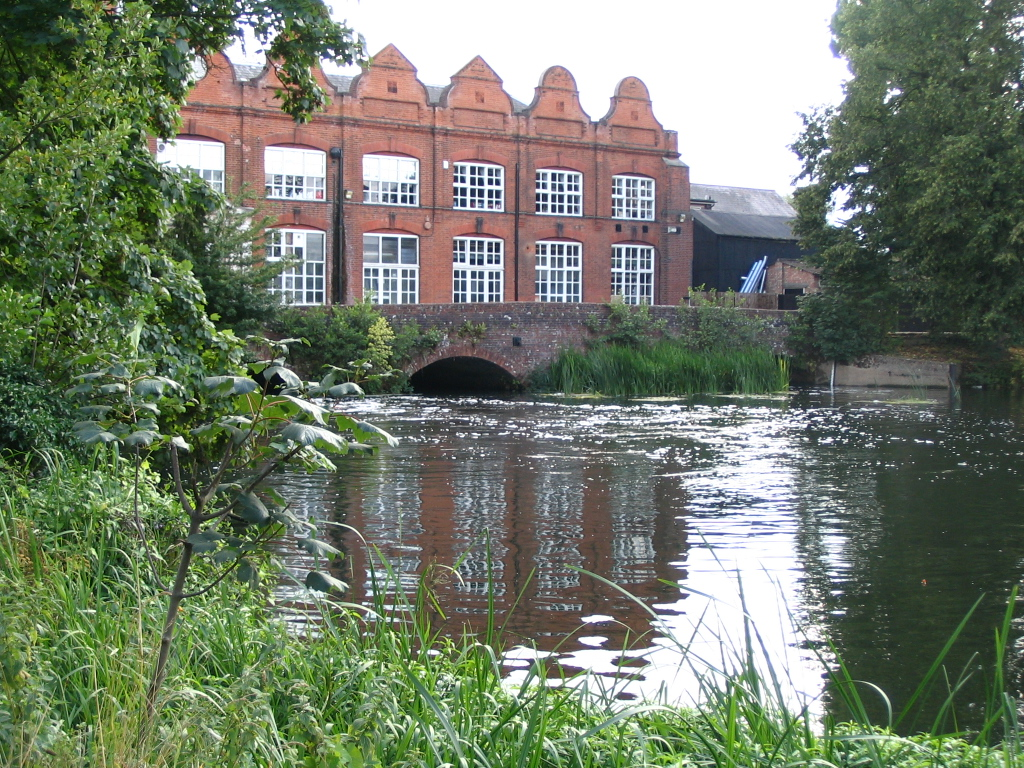
Unwins Mill

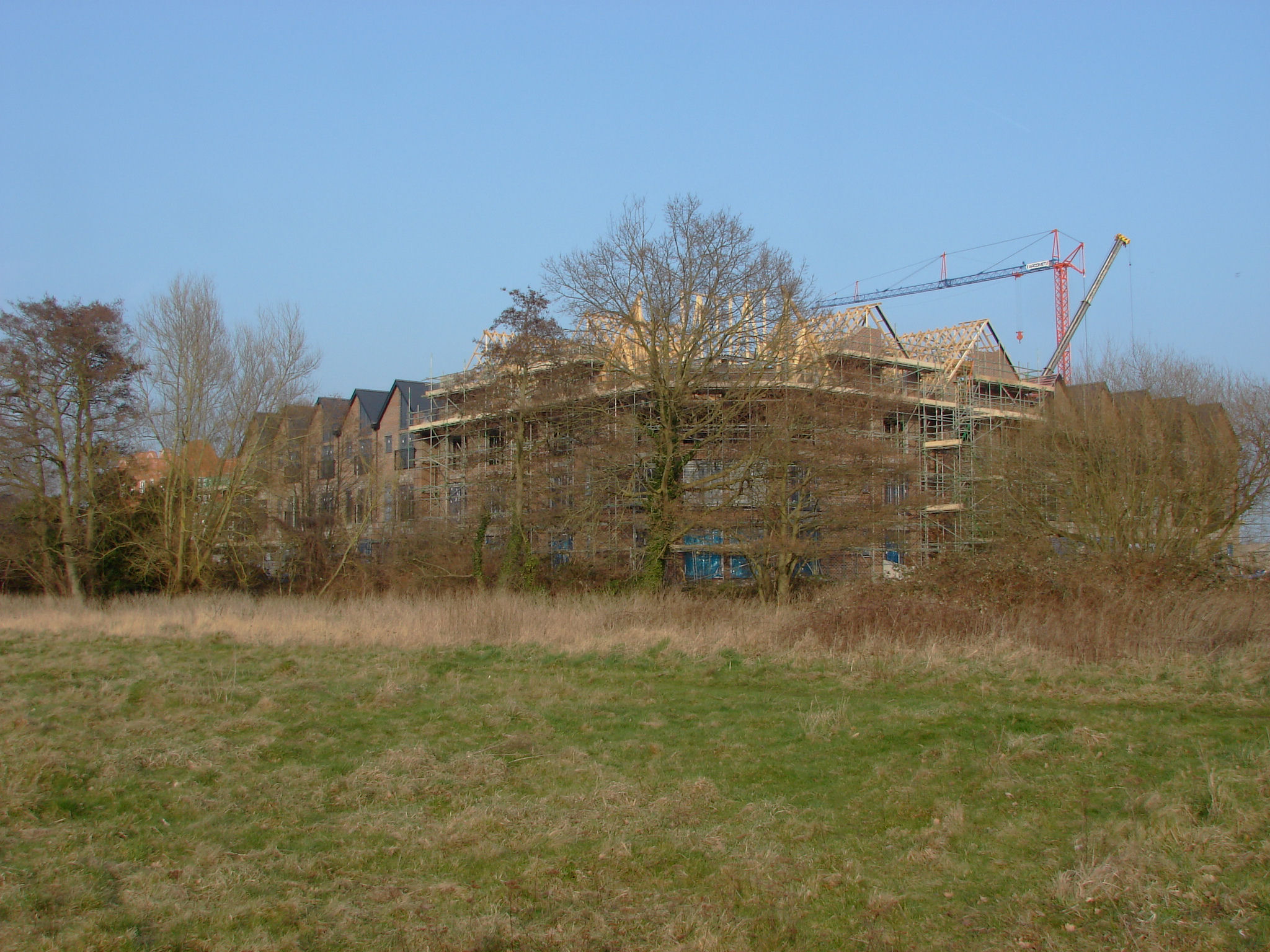
Gresham Mill

Surrounded by narrow channels which are branches of the River Wey, this imposing red-brick, tall lattice windowed former paper mill with red stone renderings has been converted to apartments and houses.

==== Gresham Mill ====
This offshoot of the same printing works on the River Wey's backwater streams, Gresham's Mill, has also been converted to large apartments and houses; its façade is in light brick, set behind trees, with a stylistic multi-hipped, gable-end roof. The mill race has been adapted to drive a hydro-electric turbine to generate electricity for the development.

== Demography ==
The proportion of households in Old Woking who owned their home outright was within 4% of the borough and regional average. The proportion who owned their home with a loan was 8% greater than the regional average; providing overall a lower proportion than average of rented residential property and of social housing, and close to the average in Surrey.

2011 Census key statistics
Output area	Population	Households	% Owned outright	% Owned with a loan	hectares
Old Woking (ward)	3,192	1,048	23.8	48.2	224

== Local government ==
At Surrey County Council, one of the 81 representatives represents the area within the Woking South East division.

At Woking Borough Council. most wards of the borough are deemed appropriate to be represented under the current constitution of councillors by one councillor, which is the case for Old Woking.

Woking Borough Councillor
Election	Member	Ward
2011	Louise Morales	Old Woking

Surrey County Councillor
Election	Member	Electoral Division
2013	Liz Bowes	Woking South East

== Transport ==
=== Roads ===
The A3 has its main access to the borough from this part of Woking, less than 2.5 miles (4.0 km) away from Old Woking's centre. Other parts of Woking have their main access to a radial route out of London in the form of the M3, either via western suburbs and open countryside or northeastern suburbs and via the M25.

The mixed use, suburban settlement is 1.3 miles (2.1 km) southeast of Woking's centre, as defined by The Peacocks, a large shopping mall, commencing immediately north of Woking railway station. Local roads are indirect to reach the settlement however which brings the distance to just over 2 miles (3.2 km) by road, however pedestrian and cycle shortcuts exist, mainly to cross the green buffer, Woking Park, which is a large park used for sports, play and tree-lined walks. This public recreation ground was laid out in 1906–7.

=== Rail ===
The main station is Woking railway station on the South West Main Line; the next nearest is Worplesdon railway station to the southwest, which is on the Portsmouth Direct Line. Services are operated by South Western Railway.

=== Buses ===
Bus services are mainly operated by Arriva, providing the following connections:

- Woking High School, Horsell via Woking town centre
- Woking railway station
- St Peter's School, Merrow (school terms only)
- The Friary Shopping Centre, Guildford
- New Haw (by Brooklands and within the post town of Addlestone)

== Gallery ==
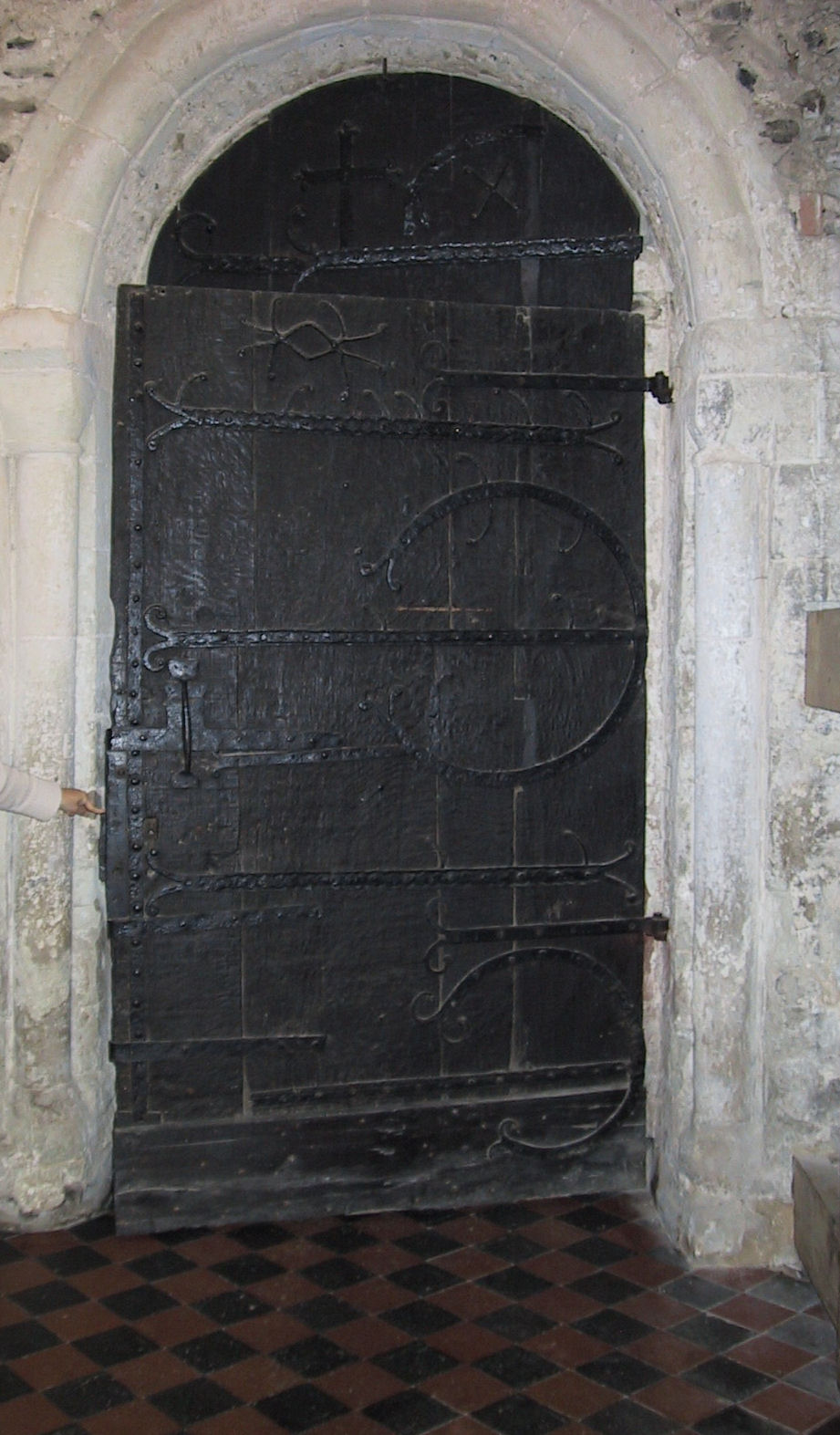
The Great Oak Door at St Peter's Church, Old Woking

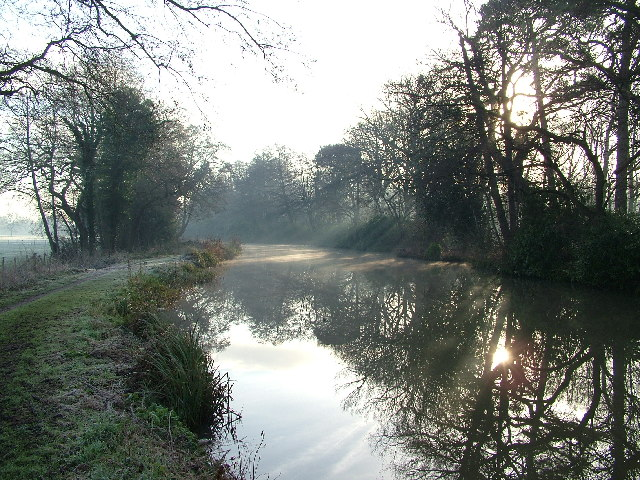
Wey Navigation Canal

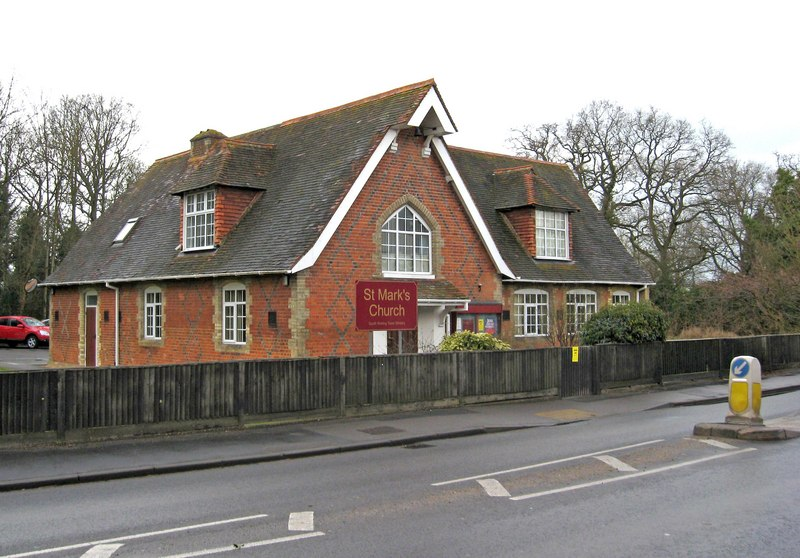
St Mark's Church
