= Honora Denny =

English courtier

- Died: 1614
- Buried: 16 August 1614; Waltham Abbey
- Spouse: James Hay, 1st Earl of Carlisle (m. 1607)
- Issue: Lady Anne Hay; James Hay, 2nd Earl of Carlisle
- Father: Edward Denny, 1st Earl of Norwich
- Mother: Lady Mary Cecil

Honora Denny (died 1614) was an English courtier.

She was the daughter of Edward, Lord Denny and Mary Cecil, a daughter of Thomas Cecil, 1st Earl of Exeter. Some sources use the name "Honoria" or "Honor".

She married a prominent Scottish-born courtier James Hay, 1st Earl of Carlisle. Their marriage was celebrated by Lord Hay's Masque written by Thomas Campion and staged on 6 January 1607. The Spanish ambassador gave her a jewel worth 6000 crowns.

She was a favourite of Anne of Denmark. They enjoyed the company of a Venetian diplomat and musician Giulio Muscorno. Muscorno argued with the ambassador Antonio Foscarini. A third Venetian diplomat, Giovanni Rizzardo investigated their quarrel and found that the queen and Lady Hay had promoted Muscorno's cause. During subsequent hearings in Venice about Foscarini's conduct, doubt was cast on Rizzardo's story, and it was suggested Lady Hay was not a lady of the court, or the queen's servant, and did not frequently visit her.

Honora was supposedly unfaithful and Hay was jealous. He broke open her cabinets in search of love letters and threatened her servants. After her death, Lady Mary Wroth alluded to their troubles in Urania and satirised Hay as Sirelius. Wroth criticised Lord Denny for taking Hay's part against his daughter. Denny responded in verse.

Joseph Hall addressed an epistle her on the subject of baptism after she lost a child.

In 1614 she was returning from a masque at court late at night in a coach and a thief reached in and stole a valuable jewel which she was wearing on her forehead. She died soon after, suffering a miscarriage, and was buried on 16 August 1614 at Waltham Abbey.

She had a daughter, Anne Hay, and a son, James Hay, 2nd Earl of Carlisle, who married Margaret Russell, a daughter of Francis Russell, 4th Earl of Bedford.

Richard Niccols dedicated two volumes to her memory, The Furies or Vertues Encomium. Or the Image of Honour (London, 1614), and Monodia, or Waltham's Complaint upon the death of the Lady Honor Hay (London, 1615).

The tomb of her aunt Dorothy Denny, wife of the crown auditor William Poovey or Purvey, at Wormley in Hertfordshire, commemorates an "Honour Denny" with a carved profile portrait of a young woman and a verse that mentions, 'Foreseeing Death, she sung a Swan-like song'.
