= George Garrard (MP) =

George Garrett or Garrard (1579 – after 1650) was an English Member of Parliament.

He was a younger son of Sir William Garrard of Dorney Court, Buckinghamshire and Elizabeth, daughter of Sir Thomas Rowe, Lord Mayor of London 1568–69. He was educated at Merton College, Oxford, from 1594, graduating BA in 1597 and MA in 1603.

He was a friend of the queen's lady in waiting Cecily Bulstrode and when she died in August 1609 he asked Ben Jonson to write an epitaph.

He was a Gentleman of the Privy Chamber extraordinary to Prince Henry in 1610–12. He was in the employ of William Cecil, 2nd Earl of Salisbury from 1614 to 1672.

In January 1618 he acted with other courtiers at Theobalds led by Sir John Finet in an interlude featuring "Tom of Bedlam the Tinker" intended to amuse King James who was suffering from gout. John Bingley was knighted on this occasion. The cast included: Thomas Dutton, Thomas Badger, George Goring, Thomas Tyringham, Edward Zouch, Robert Yaxley, William Uvedale, and Arthur Lake. The King was displeased by the play, especially the lyrics sung by Finet, and John Chamberlain was surprised that "none had the judgement to see how unfit it was to bring such beastly gear in public before a prince."

In 1621 he was elected Member of Parliament for Wigan in a by-election after the death of his uncle, Sir Thomas Gerard, 1st Baronet. In 1624 he represented Newtown (IOW) and was then elected for Preston in 1626 and 1628. In April 1640, he was elected for Hindon in the Short Parliament.

He was ordained in 1635 and became Master of the London Charterhouse from 1638 to 1650.

He married Elizabeth, the daughter of Thomas Swallow of Saffron Walden, Essex, with whom he had one son, George.

Parliament of England
Vacant Parliament suspended since 1629	Member of Parliament for Hindon; 1640; With: Sir Miles Fleetwood	Succeeded by Sir Miles Fleetwood; Robert Reynolds
