= Magdalen Wood =

English courtier and diplomatic messenger

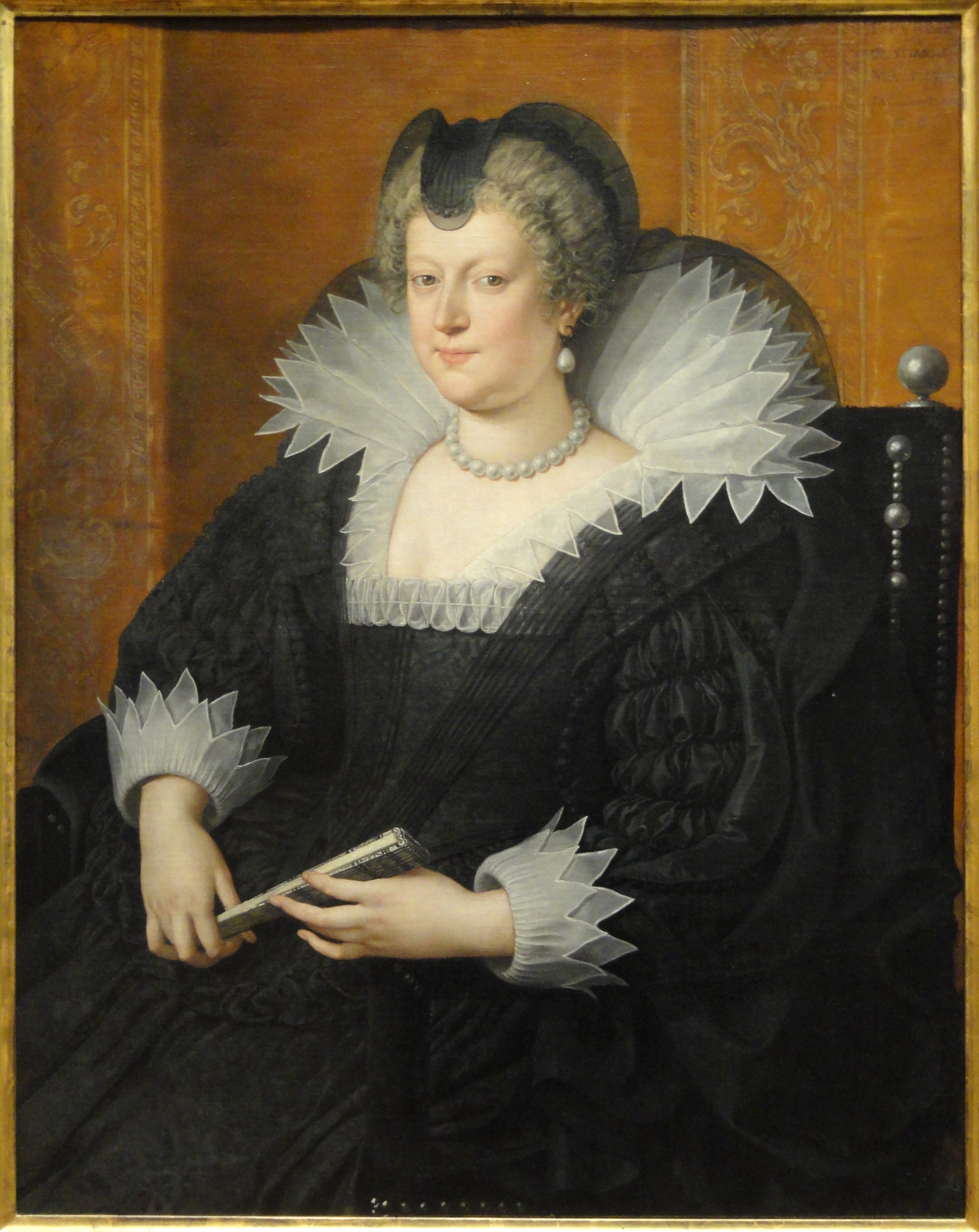
Magdalen, Lady Edmondes had an audience with Marie de' Medici (pictured) in August 1610.

Magdalen Wood (fl. 1600–1614) was an English courtier and diplomatic messenger.

== Life ==
Magdalen Wood was a daughter and co-heiress of Sir John Wood, Clerk of the Signet. She married Sir Thomas Edmondes (1563-1639), a diplomat and politician, in 1601.

One of her properties, Albyns Manor, at Stapleford Abbotts, was demolished in 1955. The Edmondes household spent Christmastime there in 1610/11.

The diplomat William Trumbull referred to Lady Edmondes as "Debora" in September 1611, in comparison with the biblical figure Deborah, an icon of female power frequently evoked in this period.

=== Tire making ===
In May 1606 she was in Brussels, and her husband's servant Jean Beaulieu wrote to William Trumbull in London, asking for clothes in the latest fashion including a white hat for Marguerite de Lalaing, the wife of Florent de Berlaymont, and for herself from her "tire" woman Mrs Colwort, a "tire" or headdress "of the newest fashion, with hair and pearls, in flowers and leaves fashion, bestowing therein an ounce of great "ragge" pearls and an ounce of small ones". She wanted glass pendants made like cherries and strawberries, 24 yards of lace made according to a pattern she sent, more lace in "newer fashions", and ribbons according to the colour and width of the pattern sent. In London Anne of Denmark appointed a tire-maker Dorothy Speckard as a servant in her household, while Blanche Swansted was tire maker to Princess Elizabeth. William Shakespeare was a lodger for a time in the house of the tire-makers Christopher and Mary Mountjoy. In 1608 the queen of France, Margaret of Valois, sent Anna of Denmark a set of flowers and jewels for head tires housed in a cabinet scented with musk and ambergris.

In 1608 as the wife of the ambassador in Brussels she received presents of apricots and ice from those wanting diplomatic favours. In 1610 Anne, Lady Tredway (née Gerrard), the wife of the new ambassador in Venice Dudley Carleton asked her for tips.

=== Spanish Infanta ===
Lady Edmondes was in England at Hampton Court with her husband in September 1609. James VI and I left to go to Waltham forest, while Anne of Denmark remained. She had an audience with Anne of Denmark, and presented her with her a portrait of the Spanish Infanta and ruler of the Netherlands, Isabella Clara Eugenia, and brought some letters from her. In 1606, Thomas Edmondes, or his assistant William Trumbull, had presented Albert and Isabella with portraits of James, Anne, and Prince Henry. The portraits were painted by John de Critz.

=== Paris ===
In August 1610 she arrived in Paris with her sister Mrs Anne Wood, travelling at speed from Breteuil in a coach with six horses. She put on formal mourning clothes sent by Anne of Denmark, and her hair was dressed in Paris by Anne of Denmark's "tire-woman", for an audience with Marie de' Medici, the widow of the recently assassinated Henry IV of France. These preparations equipped her in "the fashion of the outward grand deuil as well as any of them". Edmondes carried letters from Anne of Denmark, who had made her wait for days at court in London, and dance for her, and had eventually made her a lady of the privy chamber in ordinary while Anne Wood had been made the "child woman". Dudley Carleton wrote that Anne of Denmark's letters would "procure her a gracious reception".

The ambassador's household in Paris in 1610 included Jean Beaulieu, William Devick, John Woodford the secretary, James the Butler, Robin the porter, the cook, Thomas the footman, a lackey, and other serving men. They had all travelled in black cloaks with mourning clothes for the audiences at the French court. Beaulieu would later marry Devick's sister Elizabeth. She continued to be known as "Elizabeth Devick" and in March 1617 joined the household of Anne of Denmark as a lady in waiting.

In February 1614 Lady Edmondes became interested in buying three or four hundred "aigrette" feathers to sell on for women's headdresses. Beaulieu explained to Trumbull that Lady Edmondes wanted broad black "herneshawe" or heron feathers. Another bulk purchase was two or three dozen mallow sticks for cleaning teeth. In 1611 she had trouble getting more cloth dyed to match her bed curtains in "as lively a colour as this which she hath", the new colour was "a little browner".

She became ill in October 1614 while hosting the Thomas Howard, 21st Earl of Arundel and Alethea Howard, Countess of Arundel in Paris, Anne Wood took her place but she also became unwell. Wood recovered and came to England with the Arundels, but Edmondes worsened and after seven weeks her symptoms included, "a bloody flux and fever and great obstructions in her liver".

She died in Paris on 14/24 November 1614 and was buried on 22 February 1615 at Canterbury Cathedral.

== Family ==
Wood and Edmondes had children including;

- Henry, born July 1602,
- Isabella, born November 1607, married Henry de la Warr (1603–1628).
- Mary, born 1608, married Robert Mildmay, son of Henry Mildmay, 15th Baron FitzWalter and Elizabeth d'Arcy.
- Louisa, born in Paris in August 1611, who married one of her father's servants in March 1636.
- Lucy, born April 1614.
