= St Peter's Church, Old Woking =

St Peter's Church
- St Peter's
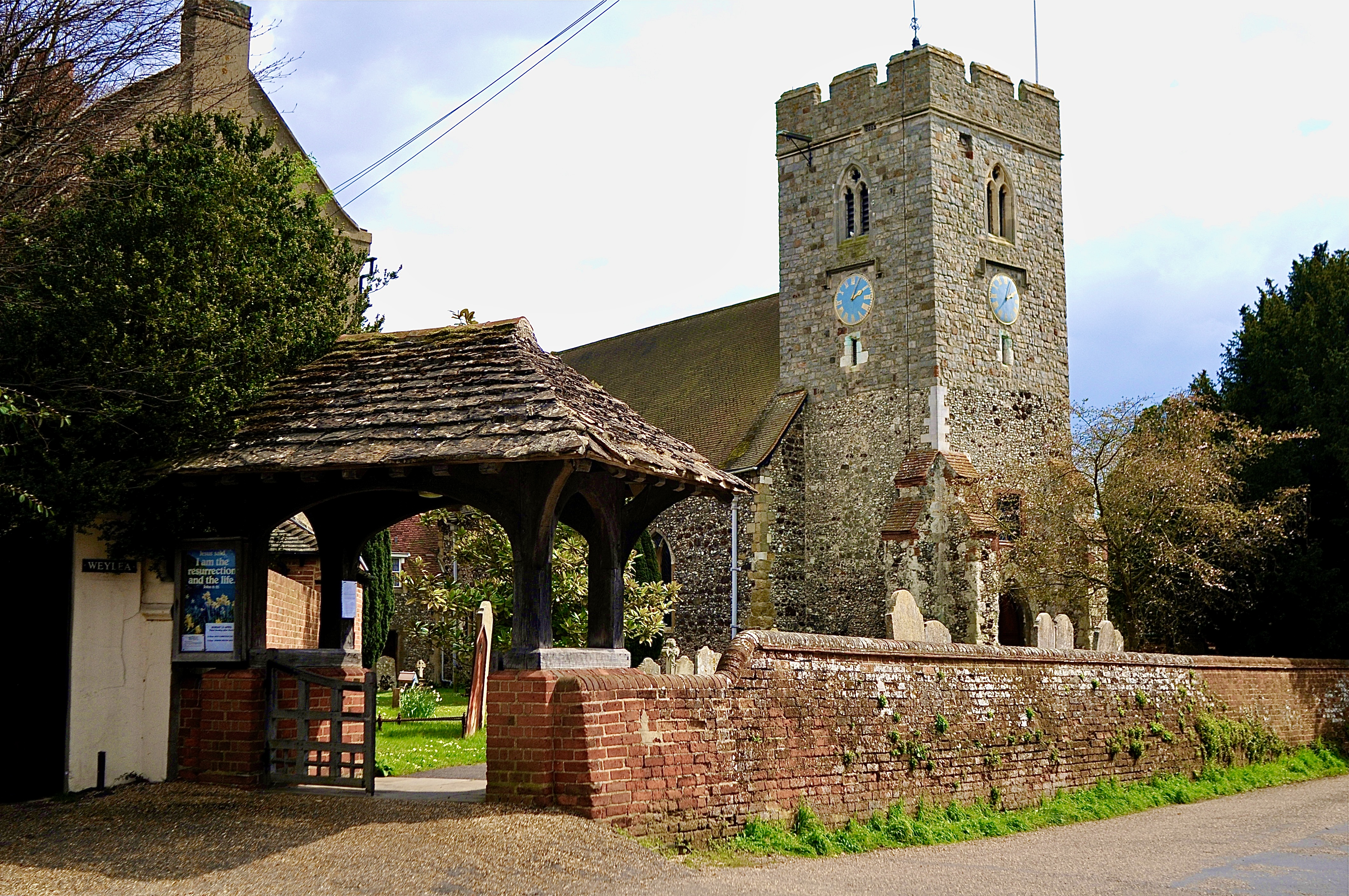
- St Peter's Church, Old Woking

- Location within Surrey
- 51°18′06″N 0°32′14″W
- OS grid reference: TQ 02084 56845
- Location: Woking
- Country: England
- Denomination: Church of England
- Website: St Peter's website

History
- Founded: 7th-century (first church)

Architecture
- Functional status: Active
- Architectural type: Norman, English Gothic

Administration
- Province: Canterbury
- Diocese: Guildford
- Parish: St Peter Woking

Clergy
- Vicar: Rev'd Jonathan Thomas

St Peter's Church is situated in Old Woking, Surrey, England. It is recorded in the Domesday Book. It also has the third oldest surviving door in the British Isles. It also has the oldest door in Surrey.

== History ==
The church is a Grade I listed building, within the Old Woking Conservation Area. St Peter's was originally the parish church of Woking prior to the development of a new urban area, now called Woking, centered on the railway station. The village of Woking subsequently became known as Old Woking. The Domesday Book records a church at "Wochinges" (an old name for Woking). An early written record relates to the foundation of a minster, dedicated to St Peter in the year 675.

== Construction and different parts of the building ==
A Norman church was built during the reign of William I of England, replacing a 7th-century Saxon wooden church. The Norman church was a simple rectangular building about 50 feet in length. Only the north and west walls survive from this period, now part of the nave. The original east wall was removed to facilitate the construction of the south aisle in the 14th century or early 15th century.

The tower is at the west end of the nave. The base of the tower was built around 1200 to 1220. It is constructed of flint and a sedimentary rock known as puddingstone. The upper part was completed around 1340.

== Door ==
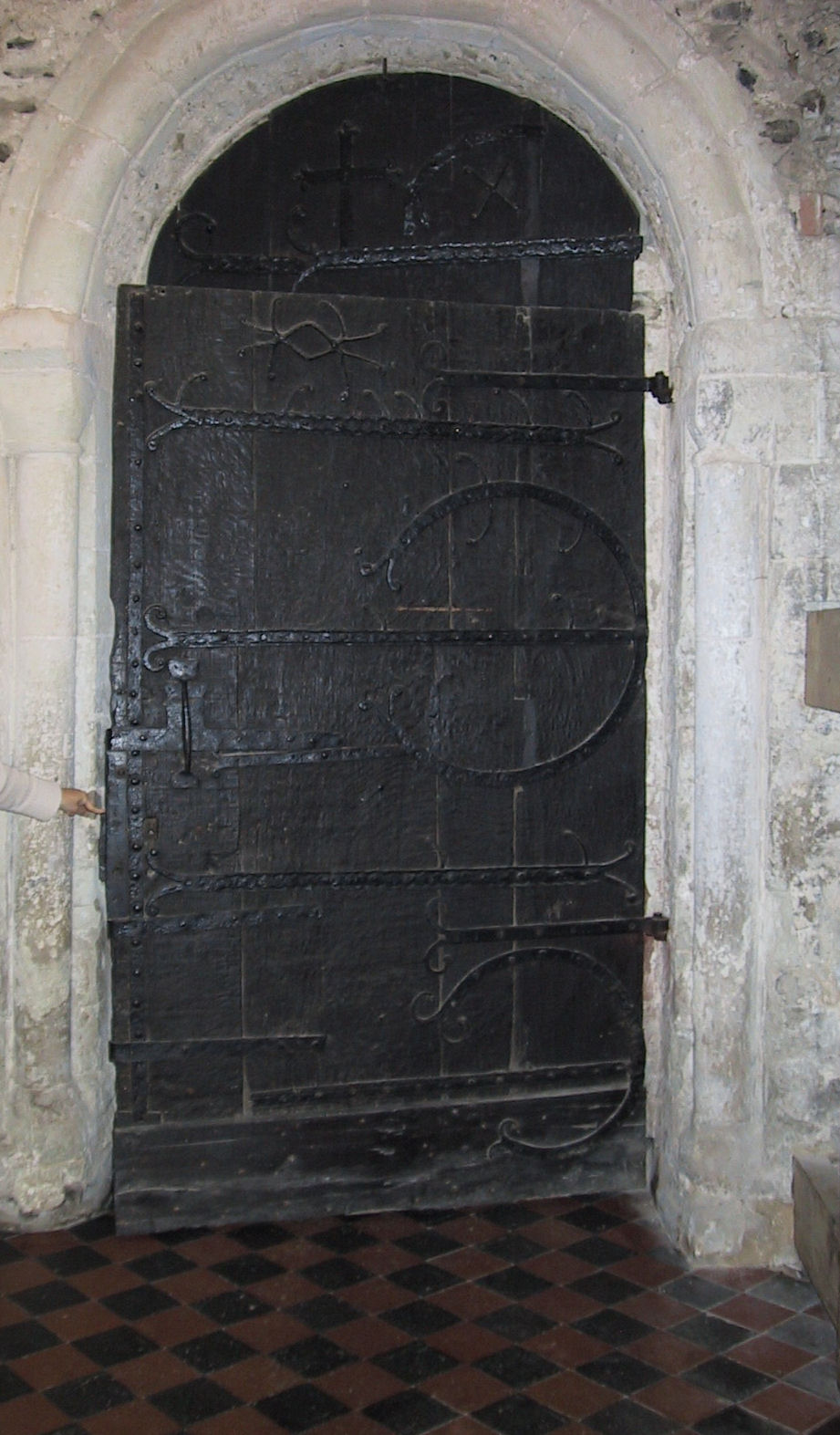
Norman Door at St Peter's Church

The west door survives from the Norman church. Originally in the west front of the church, it now opens into a porch formed by the base of the tower. It is the oldest door in Surrey and probably the third oldest in the country having been dated by dendrochronology to the reign of Henry I of England. The four oak planks making up the door may have come from a single tree which was over 270 years old when it was felled. Jane Geddes of the University of Aberdeen has identified the door as one of only five picture doors in the country and the ironwork as medieval.

== Gallery ==
The gallery, at the west end of the nave, known as the Zouche Gallery, was constructed during the reign of James I of England. It was built in 1622 at the expense of Sir Edward Zouch.

== Open days ==
The building has frequent open days on Saturdays throughout the warmer months. It used to be possible to go to the top, which is still possible on certain days. Health and Safety has restricted this though. The open days come with a tour.

== See also ==
- St Dunstan's Church, Woking

== Sources ==
- Geddes, J. (1999). Medieval Decorative Ironwork in England, London: Society of Antiquaries of London. ISBN 0-85431-273-0
- Perry, A. et al. St Peter's Church, Old Woking: Historical Guide. Leaflet printed by Woking Borough Council.
