= Arthur Lake (MP) =

English politician

Sir Arthur Lake (1598–1633) was an English politician who sat in the House of Commons from 1624 to 1626. His reputation was badly damaged by the notorious Lake-Cecil feud which lasted from 1617 to 1621, and both scandalised and fascinated the Jacobean Court.

== Early life ==
Lake was the eldest son of Sir Thomas Lake, who was Secretary of State to King James I, and his wife Mary Ryder, daughter of Sir William Ryder, Lord Mayor of London. He was a young man of some intellectual promise: he was a student of Middle Temple in 1609 and matriculated at New College, Oxford, aged 12; his entry to the college is dated 12 October 1610. He was awarded BA from Hart Hall, Oxford on 8 February 1613 and was incorporated as MA of Cambridge on 14 July 1617. He accompanied the King on his royal progress in 1617, and was knighted by him at Hoghton Tower on 18 August 1617.

== The Cecil–Lake feud ==
He played a major part in the bitter feud which erupted in 1617 between his family and the family of his brother-in-law, William Cecil, 16th Baron de Ros, grandson of Thomas Cecil, 1st Earl of Exeter, who had married Arthur's sister Anne. Arthur, Anne and their mother made lurid allegations of incest and adultery against Lord de Ros and other members of the Cecil family, all of which were found to be wholly untrue. Anne and her mother were severely punished by Star Chamber as a result.

Arthur himself was briefly imprisoned in the Tower of London on a charge of perjury, but he escaped any more serious punishment due to lack of evidence. However, his reputation was badly damaged, especially by the claim that the charge of incest against de Ros was a diversion to distract attention from Arthur's own incestuous relations with his sister Anne. De Ros challenged Arthur to a duel but Arthur refused.

De Ros died in 1618, but his father and grandparents continued to press for justice, and the matter dragged on until 1621.

== A play at Theobalds ==
In January 1618 he acted with other courtiers at Theobalds led by Sir John Finet in an interlude featuring "Tom of Bedlam the Tinker" intended to amuse King James who was suffering from gout. The cast included: Thomas Dutton, Thomas Badger, George Goring, Thomas Tyringham, Edward Zouch, Robert Yaxley, William Uvedale, and George Garret. The King was displeased by the play, especially the lyrics sung by Finet, and John Chamberlain was surprised that "none had the judgement to see how unfit it was to bring such beastly gear in public before a prince."

== Politician ==
In 1624, Lake was elected member of parliament for Minehead in the Happy Parliament. He was elected MP for Bridgwater in 1625 and 1626.

Lake died at the age of 35 and was buried at Whitchurch, Middlesex, on 19 December 1633. He married twice but had no surviving son; his estate passed to his brother Thomas, who died in 1653, and then to the youngest brother Sir Lancelot Lake, who died in 1680.

Parliament of England
| Preceded by Francis Pearce; Sir Robert Lloyd | Member of Parliament for Minehead; 1624; With: Dr Arthur Duck | Succeeded by Thomas Luttrell; Charles Pyne |
| Preceded by Roger Warre; Edward Popham | Member of Parliament for Bridgwater; 1625–1626; With: Edward Popham | Succeeded by Thomas Smith; Thomas Wroth |
