= Anthony Weldon =

English courtier and politician (1583–1648)

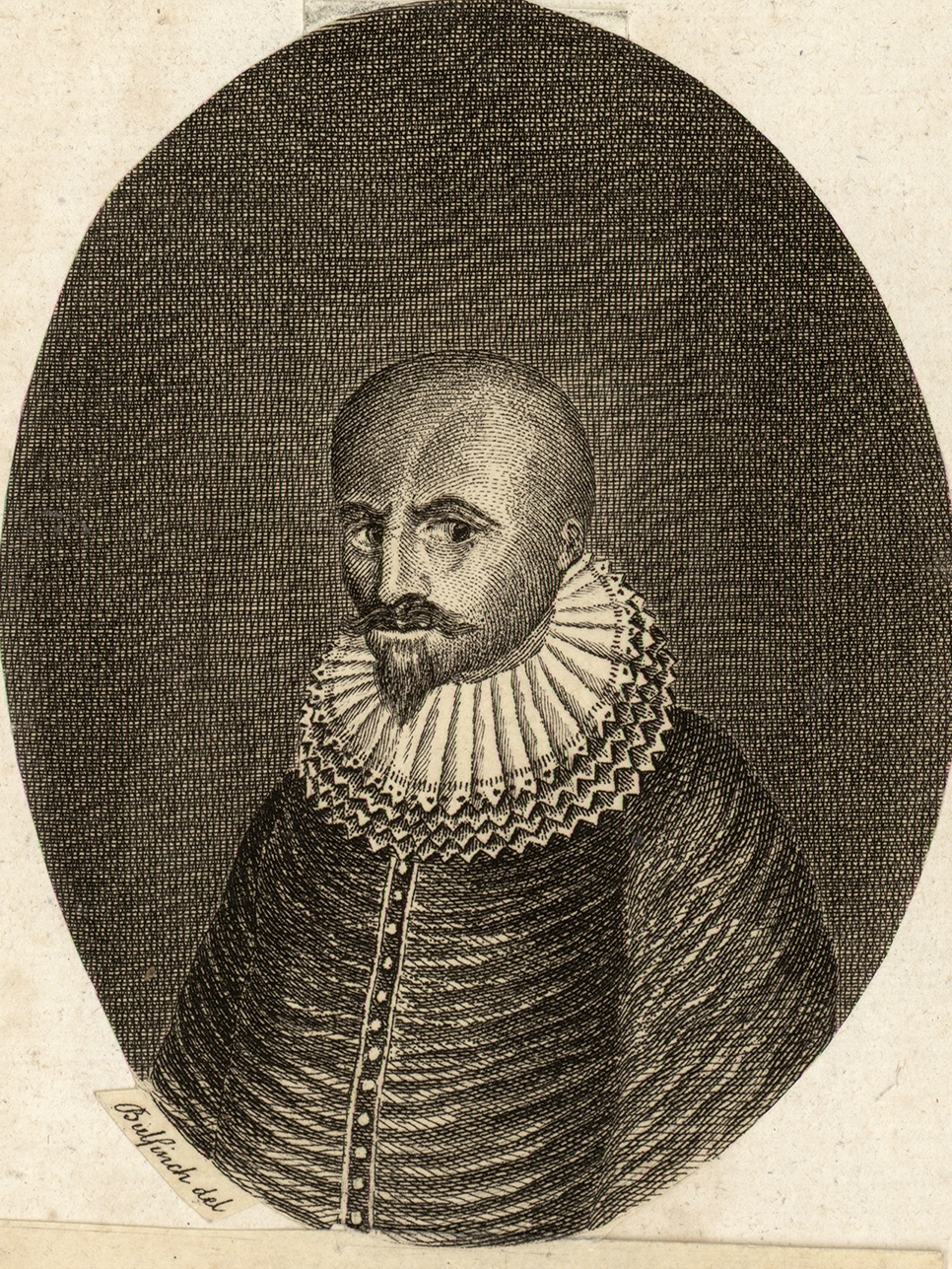
Sir Anthony Weldon

Sir Anthony Weldon (1583–1648) was an English 17th-century courtier and politician. He is also the purported author of The Court and Character of King James I, although this attribution has been challenged.

== Relations with King James ==
The story of Weldon's dismissal from King James' court for his negative assessment of the Scots in A Description of Scotland, is usually taken as the justification for the criticism of James in The Court and Character of King James I, which contains the famous comment that James was "the wisest fool in Christendom". However, it is unclear whether Weldon was the author of either of these works. A Description of Scotland was first published six years before Weldon's dismissal from the court and was not credited to him until the second half of the 17th century. Likewise The Court and Character of King James I was not credited to Weldon until after his death in 1648. He did, however, support Parliament during the English Civil War, holding and administering the county of Kent.

== Role in the English Civil War ==
In 1643 Weldon became chairman of the Kent County Committee, which was the Parliamentary government of the county. As such Weldon was a very powerful man, kind to his friends but a bitter enemy to those who crossed him. Weldon was fearless against both Royalist and Parliamentarian officials in London who tried to squeeze the Kentish economy for their own purposes. An ardent Parliamentarian, Weldon informed on the Rector of Swanscombe in 1642 whose loyalties were in doubt. When, in 1648, the county rose up against the Parliamentary regime and drew up the County Petition of complaints, Weldon roared that he would not cross Rochester High Street to save the soul of any person whose name appeared therein. The revolt was serious and General Fairfax's army was despatched to destroy the Royalists; a process which included the battle at Stonebridge Hill, Northfleet, on 1 June 1648. Weldon was in his sixties and waited in his manor house at Swanscombe for the Royalists to arrest or kill him. He is quoted as saying, "Hourly I waited to be seized, which must cost the seizers, or some of them, their lives, for I shall not be their prisoner to be led in triumph ..." Weldon lived to see Parliamentarian order restored before he died and was buried at Swanscombe on 27 October 1648.
