= John Finet =

English knight (1571–1641)

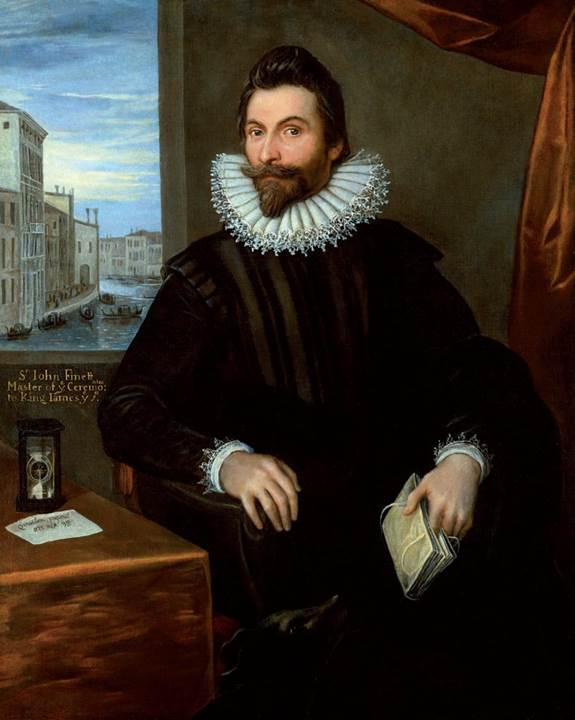
John Finet in Venice, 1610–1611, by Domenico Tintoretto

Sir John Finet or Finett (1571–1641) was the English Master of the Ceremonies in the Stuart court.

== Early life ==
Finet was a son of Robert Finet (d. 1582) of Soulton, near Dover, Kent. His mother was Alice, daughter and coheiress of John Wenlock, a captain of Calais.

His great-grandfather, John Finet, an Italian of Siena, came to England as a servant in the train of Cardinal Campeggio in 1519, settled here and married a lady named Mantell, maid of honour to Catherine of Aragon.

== Diplomat and courtier ==
Finet was in Paris early in 1610, and sent home an account of the treatment accorded to duellists in France, dated 19 February 1610. He escorted William Cecil, Viscount Cranborne, future 2nd Earl of Salisbury, through southern France and Northern Italy 1609–11. He had his portrait painted by Domenico Tintoretto in Venice.

Finet remained for a time in the service of Robert Cecil. Wood states that he was in France on diplomatic business in 1614, but on 15 December 1614 he was reported in a contemporary news-letter to have just returned from Spain, whither he had been despatched to present gifts of armour and animals to members of the royal family. Next year he was with the king at Cambridge.

On 23 March 1616 he was knighted, and on 13 September 1619 he was granted the reversion of the place of Sir Lewes Lewknor, Master of the Ceremonies, whom he had already begun to assist in the performance of his duties. On 19 February 1625 he was granted a pension of £120, vacant by the death of Sir William Button, assistant-master of the ceremonies. On 18 March 1625 he was formally admitted into Button's office on the understanding that on Finet's promotion to Lewknor's place the office should be abolished.

He commended himself to James I at court by composing and singing witty songs in the royal presence after supper with Edward Zouch. Sir Anthony Weldon credits Finet's songs with much coarseness. In January 1618, Finet offended his master by the impropriety of some verses that he introduced into a play produced by courtiers at Theobalds. The play featured "Tom of Bedlam the Tinker". It was intended to amuse King James who was suffering from gout. The cast included: Thomas Dutton, Thomas Badger, George Goring, Thomas Tyringham, Robert Yaxley, William Uvedale, Arthur Lake, and George Garret. James was displeased by the play, and especially the lyrics sung by Finet. John Chamberlain mentions the occasion was the knighting of John Bingley. Chamberlain was surprised that "none had the judgement to see how unfit it was to bring such beastly gear in public before a prince".

On Lewknor's death Finet succeeded to the Mastership of Ceremonies (12 March 1626). Finet was employed in entertaining foreign envoys at the English court, and determining the numerous difficulties regarding precedence which arose among the resident ambassadors. He was intimate with all the courtiers. Lord Herbert of Cherbury had made his acquaintance before 1616. In 1636 it was proposed at Oxford to confer on him the degree of D.C.L., but it is doubtful if the proposal was carried out.

== Family and successors ==
In 1618 Finet married Jane Wentworth (d. 1652), the 'lame' daughter of Henry, lord Wentworth, of Nettlestead, Suffolk, His brother-in-law Thomas Wentworth was created Earl of Cleveland on 7 February 1625.

Their children included:

- John Finet
- Lucy Finet
- Finetta Finet, who died unmarried in March 1709 In Aynho aged 84.
- Anna Finet (1625-1701), who married Oliver Ivye (d. 1650) of Hullavington, Wiltshire, then Edmund James (d. 1674) of Bradfield Wiltshire then William Cole (d. 1701; see ODNB), naturalist of Bristol and Bradfield
- Elizabeth Finet (1620-1705), who married Jacob Godschalk a London merchant and then Thomas Morton.
- Jane Finet, who married Richard Everard

Finet's sister, Joan Finet, was said to have been a maid of honour to Anne of Denmark. She married Thomas Foche of Wootton and Sutton near Dover.

Finet died 12 July 1641, aged 70, and was buried on the north side of the church of St. Martin's-in-the-Fields. Sir Charles Cotterell was his successor at court as Master of Ceremonies.

== Works ==
Finet was the author of the following :

1. The Beginning, Continvance, and Decay of Estates. Written in French by R. de Lusing, L. of Alymes, and translated into English by I. F. (London, 1606); dedication, signed Iohn Finet, to Richard Bancroft, archbishop of Canterbury : an essay on the history of the Turks in Europe.
2. Finetti Philoxenis: some choice observations of Sr John Finett, knight, and master of the ceremonies to the two last kings, Touching the Reception and Precedence, the Treatment and Audience, the Puntillios and Contests of Forren Ambassadors in England (London, 1656). The dedication to Philip, Viscount Lisle, is signed by the editor, James Howell. The incidents described by Finet chiefly concern the reign of James I. A manuscript copy of the book was kept at Rousham Abbey near Oxford.

An interesting letter from Finet to Lord Clifford is among the Duke of Devonshire's MSS at Bolton Abbey. Others are at Hatfield and the Record Office.

Some recipes by Finet appear in a manuscript volume formerly kept at Ettington Hall.
