= Giovanni Francesco Biondi =

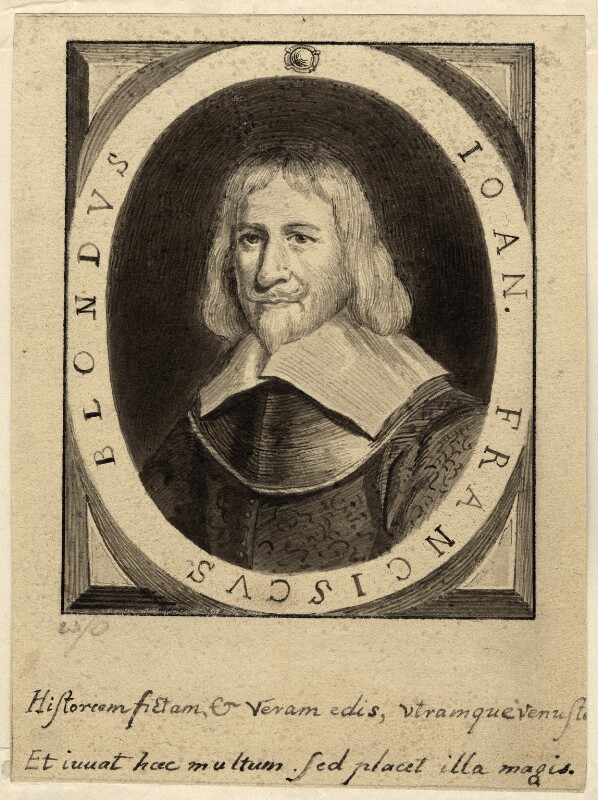
Giovanni Francesco Biondi

Sir Giovanni Francesco Biondi (also Gian Francesco Biondi; Croatian: Ivan Franjo Biondić or Biundović) (1572–1644) was an Italian diplomat, romance writer and historian, knighted by James I of England.

== Life ==
Biondi was born on Lesina (now Hvar in Croatia) in the Adriatic Sea. Entering the service of the Venetian Republic, he was appointed secretary to Pietro Piruli, the Venetian ambassador in Paris, where he stayed from 1606 to 1608. He became a Protestant convert; and then returned to Venice.

At the suggestion of Sir Henry Wotton, the English ambassador, Biondi went to England to seek his fortune. Arriving in 1609, with an introduction to James I, he was at first employed in negotiations with Charles Emmanuel I, Duke of Savoy over marriages between his children, and Henry Frederick, Prince of Wales and Princess Elizabeth. It all came to nothing, but the king granted him a pension.

In 1615 Biondi went to the Calvinist assembly in Grenoble as James I's representative, assuring them of the English king's protection and favour. From about this period he acted as a double agent, reporting also to the Venetians. On 6 September 1622 he was knighted by James I at Windsor. Soon afterwards he became a gentleman of the king's privy chamber. He had the patronage of William Cavendish, 2nd Earl of Devonshire, who died in 1628.

Biondi left England in 1640 for the house of his brother-in-law Mayerne, at Aubonne, near Lausanne, Switzerland. He died there in 1644. He was a member of the Venetian Accademia de' Signori Incogniti.

== Works ==
Biondi was the author of a trilogy of chivalric romances, which tell a continuous story, and of a work on English history. They were all written in Italian, but became popular in English translation. They are:

- L'Eromena divisa in sei libri, published at Venice in 1624, and again in 1628. It was translated into English as Eromena, or Love and Revenge (1631), by James Hayward, and dedicated to Charles Lennox, 1st Duke of Richmond. A German translation appeared in parts at Nuremberg between 1656 and 1659, and was republished in 1667.
- La Donzella desterrada, published at Venice in 1627 and at Bologna in 1637, and dedicated to the Duke of Savoy. The dedication is dated from London, 4 July 1626, and in it Biondi mentions a former promise to undertake for the duke a translation of The Countess of Pembroke's Arcadia. James Hayward translated the book into English, under the title of Donzella desterrada, or the Banish'd Virgin, in 1635.
- Il Coralbo; segue la Donzella desterrada (Venice, 1635). It was translated into English by A. G. in 1655, with a dedication to William Wentworth, 2nd Earl of Strafford. The translator states that Coralbo was regarded by Biondi as the most perfect of his romances.
- L'istoria delle guerre civili d'Inghilterra tra le due case di Lancastre e di Iorc, published in three quarto volumes at Venice between 1637 and 1644, with a dedication to Charles I. It was translated into English, apparently while still in manuscript, by Henry Carey, 2nd Earl of Monmouth, and published in two volumes in London in 1641, under the title of An History of the Civil Warres of England between the two Houses of Lancaster and Yorke.

== Family ==
Biondi married around 1622 Mary Mayerne, a former lady-in-waiting to Anne of Denmark and the sister of Sir Theodore Mayerne, the king's physician.
