= Edward Denny, 1st Earl of Norwich =

English courtier

- Earl of Norwich
- Arms of Edward Denny, 1st Earl of Norwich: Gules, a saltire argent between twelve crosses pattee or.
- Tenure: 17 October 1626 – 24 October 1637
- Born: 15 August 1569
- Died: 24 October 1637 (aged 68)
- Residence: Abbey House
- Spouse: Lady Mary Cecil
- Issue: Honora Denny, Countess of Carlisle
- Parents: Henry Denny, Dean of Chester; Honora Grey

Edward Denny, 1st Earl of Norwich (15 August 1569 – 24 October 1637), known as The Lord Denny between 1604 and 1627, was an English courtier, Member of Parliament, and a peer.

== Life ==
The son of Sir Anthony Denny's eldest son, Henry Denny, he matriculated at St John's College, Cambridge in 1585. His mother was Honora Grey, daughter of William Grey, 13th Baron Grey de Wilton and Lady Mary Somerset. He was knighted in 1587, and welcomed the Scottish King James I to England while holding the post of High Sheriff of Hertfordshire in 1603. He was M.P. for Essex in 1604, but on 27 October 1604, he was raised to the peerage as Baron Denny of Waltham.

Around 1590–1600, Denny built Abbey House on the site of Waltham Abbey, the lands of which had been in the family for several generations. Most of the old abbey buildings had been demolished, but the church remained as a parish church. The new Abbey House was directly north-east of the church. The whole building was later demolished in 1770.

The appearance of Lady Mary Wroth's The Countess of Montgomery's Urania brought protests from Denny, objecting to portrayals of real people at the work. He particularly was stung by an incident from the work that to him seemed to allude to his own family life.

He was created Earl of Norwich on 17 October 1626.

== Family ==
Edward Denny married Lady Mary Cecil, daughter of Thomas Cecil, 1st Earl of Exeter by his first wife, Dorothy Neville. They had one child, a daughter, Lady Honora Denny, who married James Hay, 1st Earl of Carlisle.

== Death & burial ==
He was buried in Waltham Abbey.

== Notes ==
Peerage of England
New creation	Earl of Norwich; 1626–1637	Extinct
New creation	Baron Denny; 1604–1637	Extinct
