= Elizabethan architecture =

Early Renaissance architecture

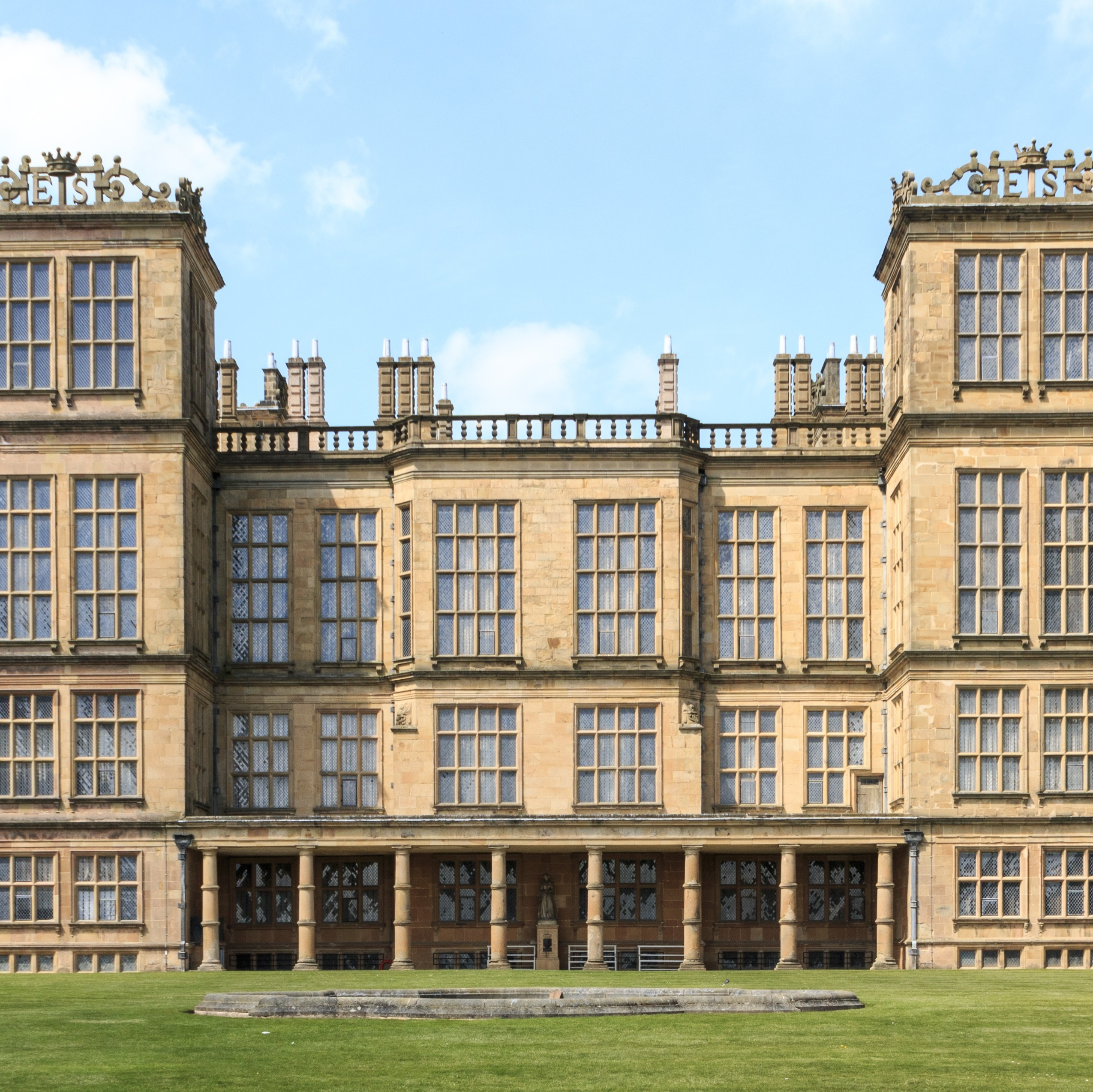
English Renaissance: Hardwick Hall (1590–1597), a classic prodigy house. The numerous and large mullioned windows are typically English Renaissance, while the loggia is Italian.

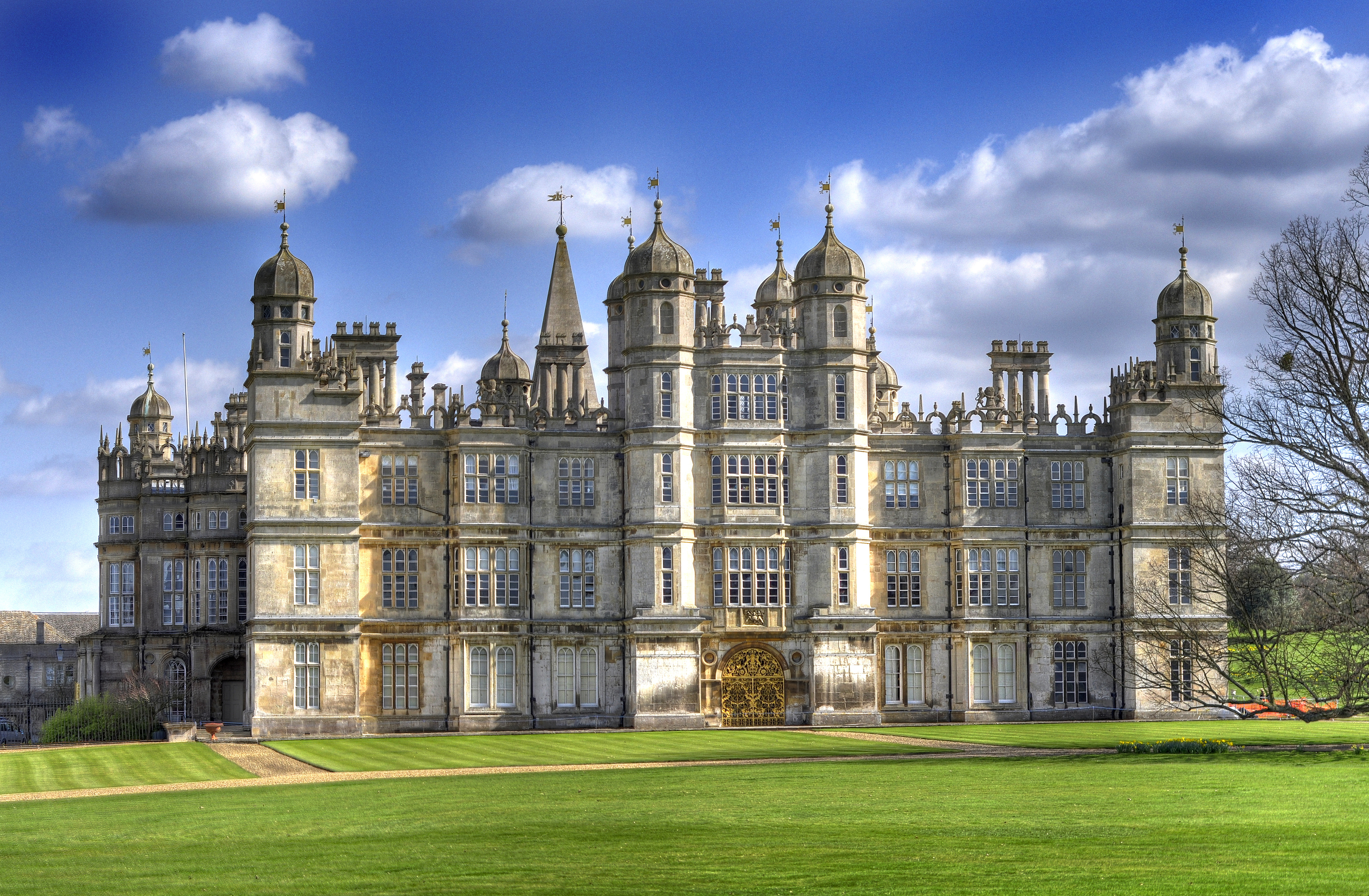
Burghley House, completed in 1587

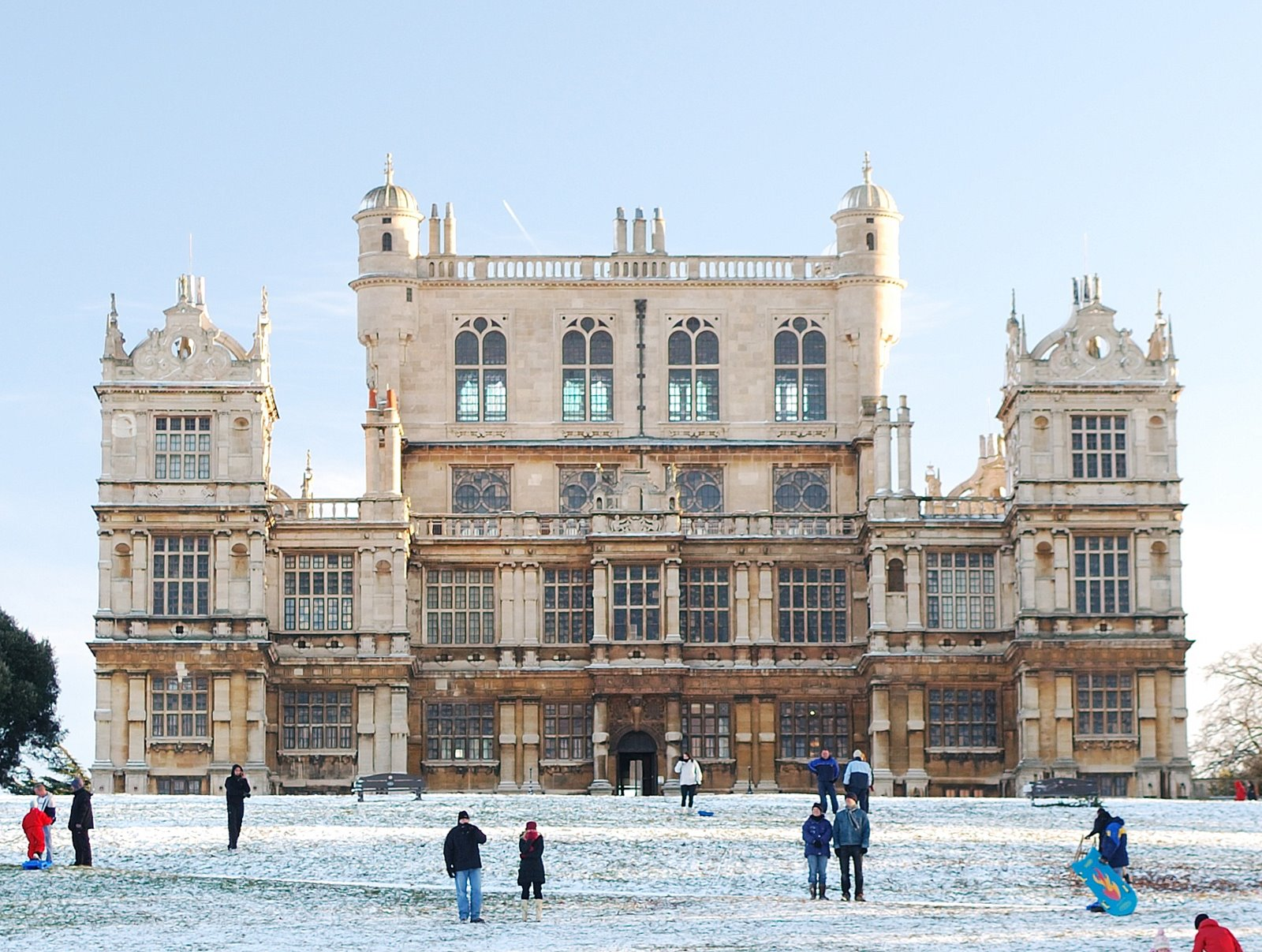
Wollaton Hall, Nottingham, England, completed in 1588 for Sir Francis Willoughby by the Elizabethan architect Robert Smythson

Elizabethan architecture refers to buildings in a local style of Renaissance architecture built during the reign of Queen Elizabeth I of England from 1558 to 1603. The style is very largely confined to secular buildings, especially the large prodigy houses built for the newly-risen nobility close to the court. Many ordinary buildings continued vernacular styles with little decoration. New religious building had ended abruptly at the Dissolution of the Monasteries from c. 1536. English architecture was late in adopting Renaissance standards compared to the rest of Europe, and in the Elizabethan style northern Europe rather than Italy was the main influence. After Elizabeth a new court culture of pan-European artistic ambition under James I (1603–1625) saw the style morph into Jacobean architecture. Stylistically, Elizabethan architecture is notably pluralistic. It came at the end of insular late Gothic traditions in design and construction called the Perpendicular style in church building, the fenestration, vaulting techniques, and open truss designs of which often affected the detail of larger domestic buildings. In the later 16th century, illustrated continental pattern-books introduced a wide range of architectural exemplars, fuelled by the archaeology of Ancient Rome.

As church building turned to the construction of great houses for courtiers and merchants, these novelties accompanied a nostalgia for native history as well as divisions in religious identity, plus the influence of continental mercantile and civic buildings. Insular traditions of construction, detail and materials never entirely disappeared. These varied influences on patrons who could favour conservatism or great originality complicate attempts to neatly classify Elizabethan architecture. This era of cultural upheaval and fusions corresponds to what is often termed Mannerism in Italy, French Renaissance architecture in France, and the Plateresque style in Spain.

In contrast to her father Henry VIII, Elizabeth commissioned no new royal palaces, and very few new churches were built, but there was a great boom in building domestic houses for the well-off, largely due to the redistribution of ecclesiastical lands after the Dissolution. The most characteristic type, for the very well-off, is the showy prodigy house, using styles and decoration derived from Northern Mannerism, but with elements retaining signifies of medieval castles, such as the normally busy roof-line.

== History ==
The Elizabethan era saw growing prosperity, and contemporaries remarked on the pace of secular building among the well-off. The somewhat tentative influence of Renaissance architecture is mainly seen in the great houses of courtiers, but lower down the social scale large numbers of sizeable and increasingly comfortable houses were built in developing vernacular styles by farmers and townspeople. Civic and institutional buildings were also becoming increasingly common.

Renaissance architecture had achieved some influence in England during the reign of, and mainly in the palaces of, Henry VIII, who imported a number of Italian artists. Unlike Henry, Elizabeth built no new palaces, instead encouraging her courtiers to build extravagantly and house her on her summer progresses. The style they adopted was more influenced by the Northern Mannerism of the Low Countries than Italy, among other features it used versions of the Dutch gable, and Flemish strapwork in geometric designs. Both of these features can be seen on the towers of Wollaton Hall and again at Montacute House. Flemish craftsmen succeeded the Italians that had influenced Tudor architecture; the original Royal Exchange, London (1566–1570) is one of the first important buildings designed by Henri de Paschen, an architect from Antwerp. However, most continental influences came from books, and there were a number of English "master masons" who were in effect architects and in great demand, so that their work is often widely spread around the country.

Important examples of Elizabethan architecture include:

- Burghley House
- Charterhouse (London)
- Condover Hall (Shropshire)
- Danny House
- Hatfield House
- Kenilworth Castle
- Longleat House
- Montacute House
- Wollaton Hall
- Rainthorpe Hall

In England, the English Renaissance first manifested itself mainly in the distinct form of the prodigy house, large, square, and tall houses such as Longleat House, built by courtiers who hoped to attract the queen for a ruinously expensive stay, and so advance their careers. Often these buildings have an elaborate and fanciful roofline, hinting at the evolution from medieval fortified architecture.

It was also at this time that the long gallery became popular in large English houses. This was apparently mainly used for walking in, and a growing range of parlours and withdrawing rooms supplemented the main living room for the family, the great chamber. The great hall was now mostly used by the servants, and as an impressive point of entry to the house.

== Examples of Elizabethan Architecture ==
Several historic English buildings illustrate the characteristics of Elizabethan architecture.

=== 1. Hardwick Hall ===
Hardwick Hall in Derbyshire is one of the best-known examples of late Elizabethan architecture. Built for Bess of Hardwick in the late 16th century, it is famous for its large windows, symmetrical composition, prominent vertical proportions, and extensive use of glass.

Its design demonstrates how daylight, geometry, and carefully organized façades became important features of prestigious English residences.

=== 2. Longleat House ===
Longleat House in Wiltshire is an important example of the transition toward Renaissance-inspired English country-house architecture. Developed during the 16th century, it features an impressive arrangement of façades, large windows, and formal architectural proportions.

The building reflects the growing preference for grand residences designed to combine domestic comfort with ceremonial display.

=== 3. Wollaton Hall ===
Wollaton Hall in Nottingham is another notable example of late Elizabethan architecture. Constructed in the late 16th century, it combines Renaissance-inspired ornamentation with a monumental silhouette and an elaborate central structure.

Its design demonstrates the influence of continental Renaissance ideas on wealthy English patrons and architects.

=== 4. Montacute House ===
Montacute House in Somerset is celebrated for its symmetrical façade, classical details, large windows, and carefully arranged architectural composition. Built around the end of the 16th century, it illustrates the growing influence of Renaissance principles on English domestic architecture.

Its long gallery, positioned on the upper floor, also reflects the importance of display, recreation, and social life in aristocratic residences.

== Surveyors (architects) active in this period ==
- Robert Adams (1540–1595)
- William Arnold (fl. 1595–1637)
- Simon Basil (fl. 1590–1615)
- Robert Lyminge (fl. 1607–1628)
- Robert Smythson (1535–1614)
- John Thorpe or Thorp (c. 1565–1655?; fl.1570–1618)

== See also ==
- Tudor architecture, a term used to describe the buildings of the previous generation and also sometimes Elizabethan buildings
- Jacobean architecture, the next phase of English Renaissance architecture
- Tudorbethan and Jacobethan, revivals derived (in part) from Elizabethan architecture

== Sources ==
- Airs, Malcolm, The Buildings of Britain, A Guide and Gazetteer, Tudor and Jacobean, 1982, Barrie & Jenkins (London), ISBN 0091478316
- Girouard, Mark, Life in the English Country House: A Social and Architectural History 1978, Yale, Penguin, etc.
- Jenkins, Simon, England's Thousand Best Houses, 2003, Allen Lane, ISBN 0713995963
- Summerson, John, Architecture in Britain, 1530 to 1830, 1993 edition, Yale University Press Pelican History of Art, Yale University
- Elizabethan Architecture: Characteristics, History, Examples
- Press, ISBN 0300058861, ISBN 9780300058864
