= Richard Coningsby =

Richard Coningsby (died 1620) was an English courtier who served as an usher and Black Rod. He was the member of Parliament for Leominster in 1593.

== Career ==
Richard Coningsby's family background is unclear, but he seems to have been a relation of Thomas Coningsby of Hampton Court, Herefordshire, and a grandson of Thomas Coningsby I (died 1559) an MP for Herefordshire in 1559.

Richard Coningsby was a gentleman usher of the chamber at the court of Elizabeth I. From 1594, he was also the keeper of Easthampstead Park in Berkshire, which was then a royal deer park. Coningsby served as a commissioner of the peace in Berkshire and in Wiltshire in 1602.

Coningsby was married twice. His first wife was a relation of a colleague, the usher Thomas Rolles, surnamed Barker. His second wife was Margaret Corham (died 1657), a daughter of Robert Corham of Holdshott in Heckfield. Some years after his death, in 1638 his second wife became a nun in Ghent under the name Mary Ignatia Coningsby with her nieces Justina and Cornelia Corham.

Coningsby had a daughter Mary who married Ralph Scrope, who was his successor as keeper of Easthampstead. A William Coningsby was one of Richard's predecessors.

=== Mission to Scotland ===
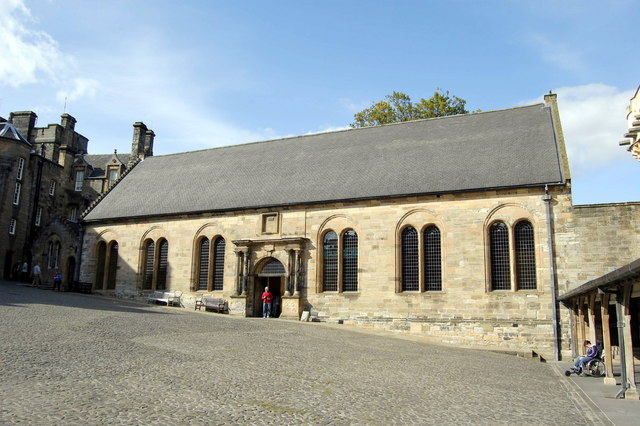
Coningsby joined the English diplomats in the Chapel Royal of Stirling Castle on 30 August 1594.

In August 1594, Richard Coningsby joined the retinue of the ambassador Robert Radclyffe, 5th Earl of Sussex, to travel to Stirling Castle for the baptism of Prince Henry. Other prominent companions of the Earl of Sussex were Lord Wharton, Sir Henry Bromley of Holt, Hugh Portman, Henry Guildford, Oliver Cromwell, Thomas Monson, Henry Clare, Edward Greville, Nicholas Sanderson, Edward Gorges, and William Jeffson, and the usher Mr. Rolles. Coningsby was in charge of bringing the presents from Queen Elizabeth, while Rolles rode to Edinburgh with letters from the Earl of Sussex to King James VI.

The baptism was delayed until this party arrived at Stirling Castle at the end of August. Coningsby wrote from Stirling to Sir Robert Cecil that the baptism was "solemnly performed within the new chapel at Stirling". According to the order of service, the ushers and other English officers were to serve the ambassador at his seat in the chapel.

Sussex reported that the Queen's gifts were "orderly presented" and greatly admired by the Scottish court and other diplomats. James Melville of Halhill, who attended Anne of Denmark when the gifts were presented after the baptism, noted that the jewelled gilt plate and gold cups selected from the Jewel House at the Tower of London were "cunningly wrought".

The resident English ambassador Robert Bowes reported that the two ushers, Coningsby and Thomas Rolles, had "performed their duties with careful providence to see all things done and observed" for the honour of Elizabeth I.

Coningsby wrote that he would have liked to learn more about Scotland to report to Robert Cecil, but time was short, he had few contacts, and his "disposition was not to be much inquisitive". He thought that England might be unpopular in Scotland, writing "I find no manner of content in respect of her Majesty's southern countries". He signed his letter "Ry. Connyngesbey".

== Holland cheese ==
In 1600, Robert Sidney sent four "excellent Holland cheeses" for the queen's servants, to be eaten at the ushers and daily waiters table. The cheese was somehow mislaid or purloined, and Rowland Whyte asked Sidney to send more cheese to George Pollard and Coningsby.

== Usher at the court of King James ==
Richard Coningsby and Thomas Rolles continued to serve as ushers at court for King James after the Union of the Crowns. They were sworn as his servants at York in May 1603. Coningsby was knighted later in the year. Rolles, a "gentleman usher daily waiter", bought a house in Lewknor and died in 1606.

=== The usher's role ===
An usher in the reign of Mary I, probably John Norreys or Norris, wrote a treatise which describes ceremony at court and the various roles undertaken by ushers. The ushers were tasked with preparing lodgings and preparations for entertainments, and worked with the "harbingers" during royal progresses. Richard Coningsby made rooms ready at Hampton Court for the performance of plays at Christmas 1590. Similar subsequent payments to him are recorded in accounts called "Apparellings".

In April 1605, "Sr Richarde Connigesbie", as a gentleman usher daily waiter, was paid an allowance for making Whitehall Palace ready for the King and his brother-in-law, Ulrik, Duke of Holstein, on their return from hunting at Marylebone Park. On this occasion his team included a yeoman usher, four other yeomen, two groom of the chamber, two grooms of the wardrobe, and a groom porter. In the same month, Coningsby and the groom porter Thomas Williams were paid for serving at meetings of the commissioners for a union between England and Scotland.

Coningsby and the yeoman ushers travelled to Beaulieu in 1612 to make preparations for a royal visit. Stands were built for the royal party to watch football and animal baiting. King James came to Beaulieu in August 1613.

=== Parliament and Black Rod ===
Richard Coningsby was usher of the House of Lords from 1598. In 1601 the journal of the House recorded his complaint on a point of privilege. In 1614, he came to the House of Commons to inform them of the royal summons, now a well-known role of Black Rod.

Coningsby supervised preparations for holding Parliament at Westminster. Roger Aston sent him wool and say and serge fabric from the royal wardrobe in 1608 to upholster the seating.

=== George Pollard of Langley ===
From 17 October 1605 to 1617, Coningsby shared the office of usher at Parliament, or Black Rod, with George Pollard of Langley. Pollard's wife Elizabeth née Leche, was a half-sister of Bess of Hardwick. She was Mother of the Maids at court between 1567 and 1598. George Pollard was her second husband. Her first husband was Anthony Wingfield (died 1593) who also served as a gentleman usher. Anthony Wingfield took part in the coronation of Elizabeth I, walking in costume to represent the Duke of Guyenne. Anthony and Elizabeth Wingfield's surviving correspondence discusses New Year's Day gifts at court. After George Pollard died, in March 1617 Coningsby was confirmed as Black Rod with the Scottish usher James Maxwell appointed in reversion.

=== Playing cards ===
Coningsby had a grant of a patent or monopoly for importing and selling playing cards in 1615, but this seems not to have been profitable and card-makers raised objections. The scheme was intended to repay the King's debt of £1,800 owed to Coningsby.

== Later life ==
Richard Coningsby returned to Scotland with King James during the progress in 1617. He died in 1620. John Chamberlain wrote that he was the "oldest gentleman-usher". The office of Black Rod passed to a Scottish usher James Maxwell.

== Portrait ==
The collection at Longleat House includes a portrait of Richard Coningsby as Black Rod.
