= Affabel Partridge =

English goldsmith

Affabel Partridge was a London goldsmith who served Elizabeth I. He is thought to have marked his work with a hallmark of a bird.

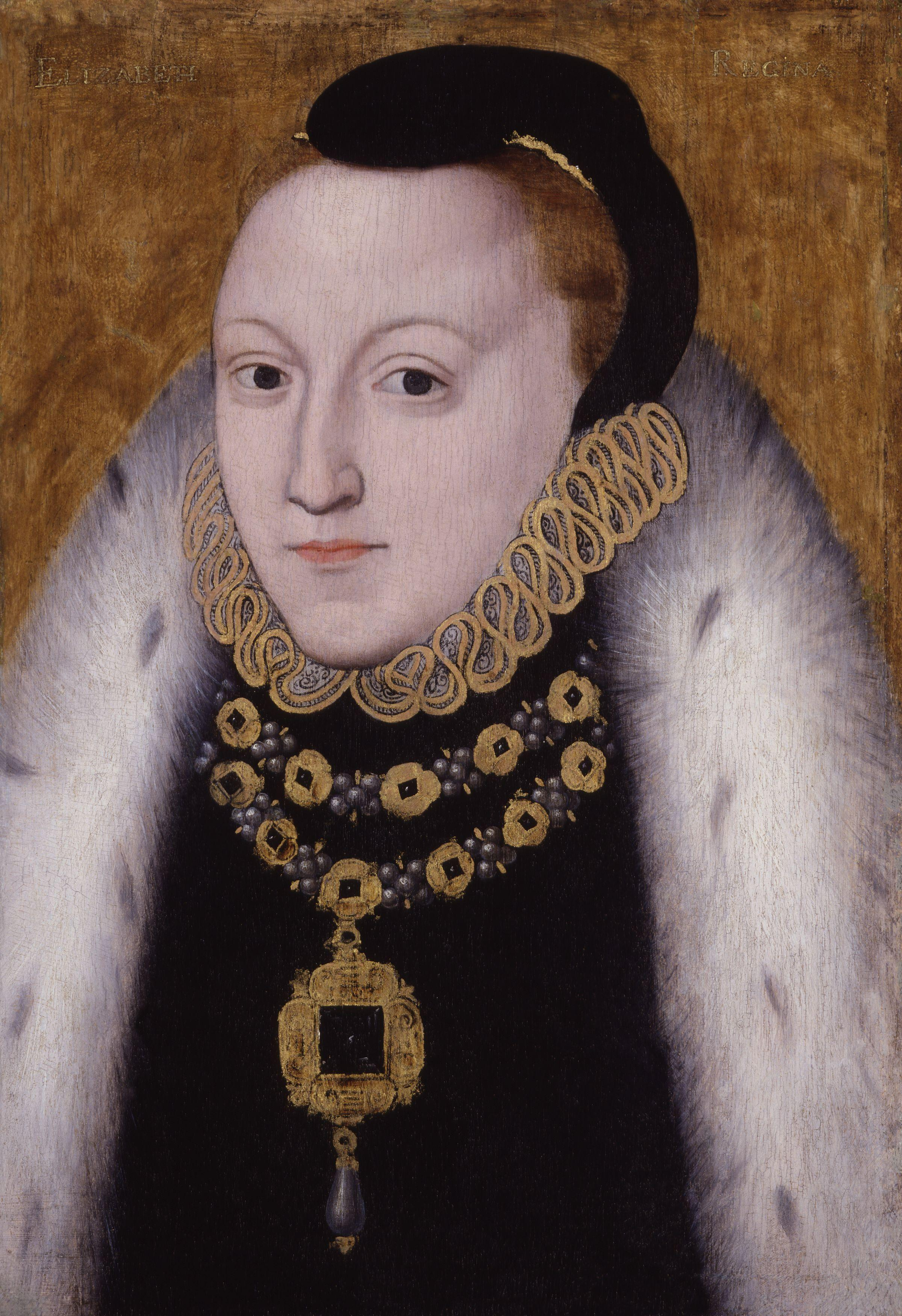
Affabel Partridge was set to work improving old royal jewellery for Elizabeth I in 1560

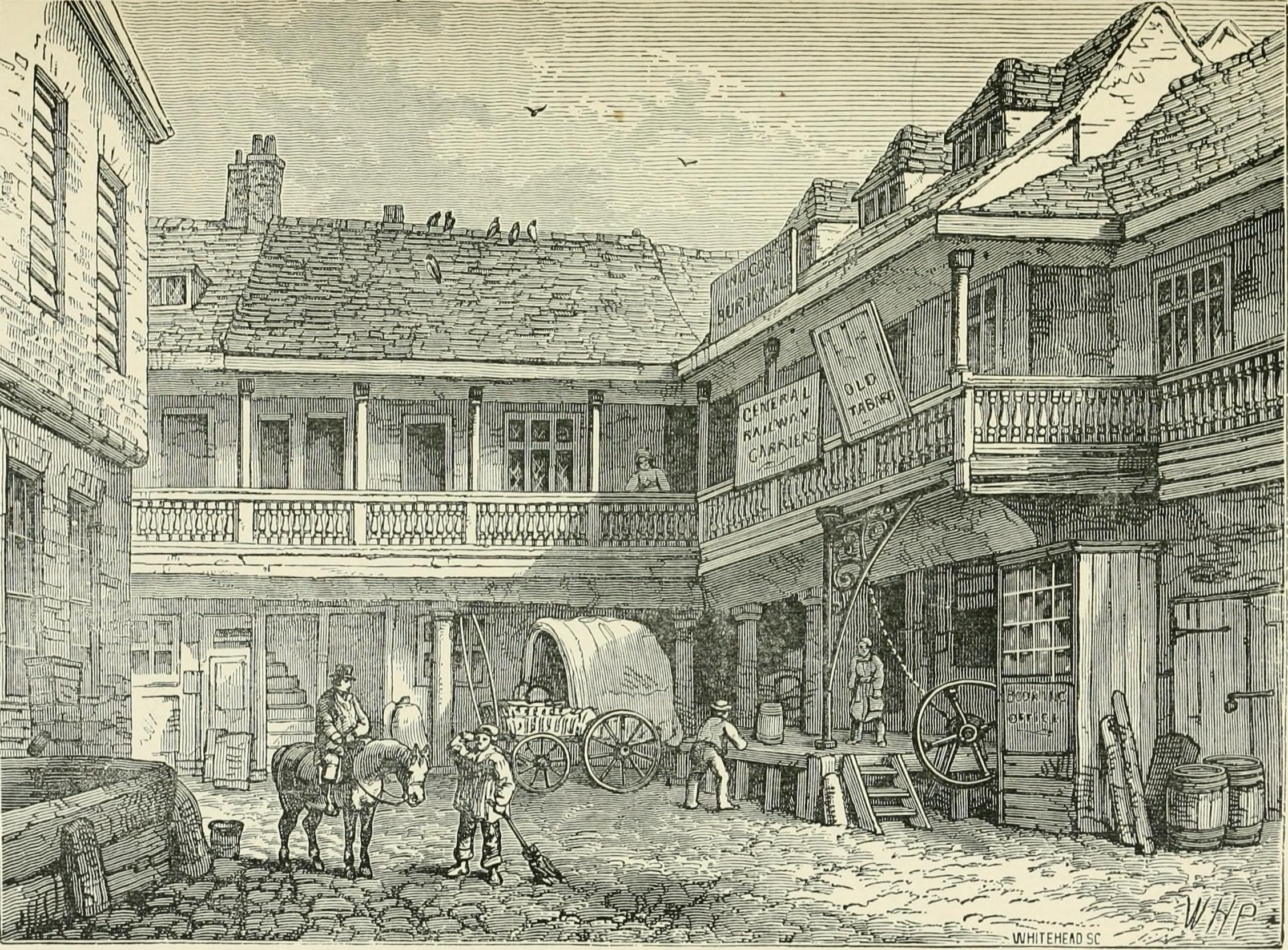
Affabel Partridge lent money to Robert Mabbe on the security of a pub in Southwark called The Tabard

== Career ==
Partridge was an apprentice of Richard Crompton. He worked at the sign of the Black Bull in Cheapside. On 25 July 1554 (her wedding day), Mary I ordered some of the jewels in the Tower of London to be delivered to her goldsmith "Affabel Partriche".

With Robert Brandon, he became a goldsmith to Elizabeth I on her accession. They were joined by Hugh Keall in 1577.

Brandon and Partridge supplied hundreds of pieces of plate which Elizabeth distributed as New Year's Day gifts, and as gifts on other occasions. They also repaired tableware. In September 1560 Partridge and Brandon received 4000 ounces of silver plate scrapped from the Jewel House as unfit to serve at the queen's table, to be melted down and made into new objects.

Partridge established himself on Cheapside at the "Sign of the Black Bull". On 25 July 1560, Partridge was employed to repair and reset old jewels from the Tower of London into a "better fashion" for Queen Elizabeth to wear from time to time, meet and suitable for her occasional use. The pieces for refashioning were "fifty tablets of sundry fashion tied upon a string whereof diverse have pomanders within them", and broken nether and upper habiliments (the jewelled bands which were worn at the forehead of a French hood), with aglets and their laces and pins. Partridge was to pay attention to the enamelling. The aged Marquess of Winchester was ordered to deliver the jewels to the goldsmith.

Partridge and Brandon were permitted to collect base money for refining at the royal mint in October 1560.

Partridge sued Edward Baeshe of West Coker for the value of a garter set with rubies and pearls in 1565. Baeshe had paid for a gold flower set with diamonds and pearls.

"Aphabelle Partridge" subscribed to a general lottery in 1568, and wrote this verse:

If hawk do soar and partridge springs,
Then shall we see what luck he brings,
But if he soar and partridge flit,
Then hawk shall lose and partridge hit.

It is thought that Affabel Partridge used the device of a bird as his hallmark. A silver gilt salt belonging to the Vintner's Company with the bird mark and London hallmarks for 1569/70 may his work. The salt is decorated with renaissance ornament and emblematic figures of virtues derived from German patterns. The early history of the salt is unknown. Records show that Partridge provided similar objects. In 1576 Partridge supplied three gilt salts with "a cover of the French making". "Affabell Partrydge" signed the vestry minutes of Stepney parish twice in 1583 and probably died in that year.

Partridge lent money to a goldbeater Robert Mabbe, a son of the goldsmith John Mabbe, taking as security a share of the Tabard Inn, Southwark.

Partridge and Brandon were succeeded as royal goldsmiths by Richard Martin and Hugh Kayle.

== Family ==
He is said to have married (1) Anne Fildus, (2) Margery Gilbard. His third wife was Denise or Dionise, the widow of John Owtred who held land in Havering. His children included:

- Thomas Partridge
- Ellen Partridge, who married Thomas Berthellet, perhaps the Thomas Bartlett who Partridge owed money to in 1578.
- Mary Partridge, daughter of Margery, who married Thomas Wadnall, their daughter Jane (died 1616) married Robert Mabbe
- Dionyssus Partridge, who married the goldsmith Stephen Mabbe, a son of the goldsmith John Mabbe who served Mary I of England.
- Stephen Partridge, a goldsmith, who christened his daughter "Dennis" in March 1590 at St Peter upon Cornhill.
