= New Year's Day gift (royal courts) =

Historical gift-giving tradition

At the Tudor and Stuart royal courts in Britain it was traditional to give gifts on New Year's Day, on 1 January. Records of these gift exchanges survive, known as "gift rolls", and provide information about courtiers and their relative status. A similar custom at the French court was known as the étrenne. Gift-giving on New Year's Day at the court of King Arthur is the setting of the 14th-century romance Sir Gawain and the Green Knight. Historians often analyse these gift economies following the ideas of the anthropologist Marcel Mauss and Bronisław Malinowski's description of the Kula ring.

== Gifts and status ==
Margaret of Anjou and Elizabeth of York gave and received jewels and plate as New Year's Day gifts. The value of the plate given was calibrated to match the rank, status, and standing of the courtier. While gold plate might not always have been more valued than silver, gem-set jewellery seems to have been a token of special royal favour.

In 1504, James IV of Scotland gave Margaret Dennet, an English servant of his queen consort Margaret Tudor, a gold chain with a figure of Saint Andrew worth £20 Scots. James IV gave Margaret Tudor two sapphire rings, and in 1507 a "serpent's tongue", a fossil shark's tooth supposed to be a talisman against poisoning. In 1507, James IV gave Elizabeth Berlay, another English attendant of Margaret, gold rosary beads with a cross costing £62 Scots. On 1 January 1512, Ellen More, an African servant, was given 5 French crowns at Holyrood Palace and the same amount was given to two "maidens" at Holyrood Palace, servants of Elizabeth Barlay. Elizabeth Sinclair received 10 crowns.

James V bought New Year's Day gifts for the French court in 1537, including daggers or whingers for Dauphin Henry and King Henry II of Navarre and ruby bracelets for the dauphine, Catherine de' Medici. He gave gifts at the New Year Mass in 1539, and a length of black ribbon was bought to make loops for lockets or pendants known as "tablets". He paid a goldsmith John Mosman £410 Scots for making chains, rings, tablets, bracelets, targets (brooches or hat badges), and other gold work brought to him at Stirling Castle to be New Year's gifts for his courtiers in January 1541. Other gifts of gold "Paris work" were provided by Thomas Rynd including "chaffrons" for French hoods, bracelets, rosary beads, buttons and a ring.

In 1520, the Duke of Buckingham commissioned a gold pomander with the heraldic badges of Henry VIII and Catherine of Aragon for her New Year's Day gift, to be filled with scented compound and worn on her girdle. The lady-in-waiting Isabel Leigh gave Henry VIII a shirt she had embroidered and received a silver cup in return. The council of the household of Princess Mary wrote from Tewkesbury to Cardinal Wolsey in November 1525, wondering if she should send New Year's Day gifts.

Henry VIII gave Anne Boleyn a large quantity of silver plate on 1 January 1533, many pieces were newly refurbished and stamped by Cornelis Hayes with her arms as Marquess of Pembroke, and some had been confiscated from Sir Henry Guildford. Anne Boleyn told the goldsmith Cornelis Hayes that she would give her ladies-in-waiting riding equipment rather than jewels or plate. In 1534, George Boleyn gave Henry VIII a bonnet of black velvet adorned with gold aglets and buttons, a further set of buttons and a brooch.

Henry VIII sometimes received his gifts in person, in 1538 leaning against a cupboard while Brian Tuke made notes of the presents and donors. The silver and gilt plate which Henry gave to his courtiers in return for their gifts was made or supplied by goldsmiths including Cornelis Hayes and Robert Amadas. Claiming these items of gift plate could involve administrative fees and a visit to the Jewel House, a process described in 1605 by the Earl of Huntingdon.

When Margaret Douglas was in favour in 1539 at the court of Henry VIII, she was given a gilt cup made by the goldsmith Morgan Wolf as a New Year's Day gift. In 1543, Margaret Douglas gave Mary a satin gown of carnation silk in Venice fashion. Prince Edward gave Mary a "little tablet of gold". Mary spent £40 on silver plate from Cornelis Hayes to serve as gifts and gave £30 to Susan Clarencieux and her servant Hobbes to purchase other gifts for January 1543. Prince Edward wrote to Catherine Parr from Hatfield on 14 January 1547, thanking her for a New Year's Day gift of a jewel or ring with her image and the King's "expressed to the life".

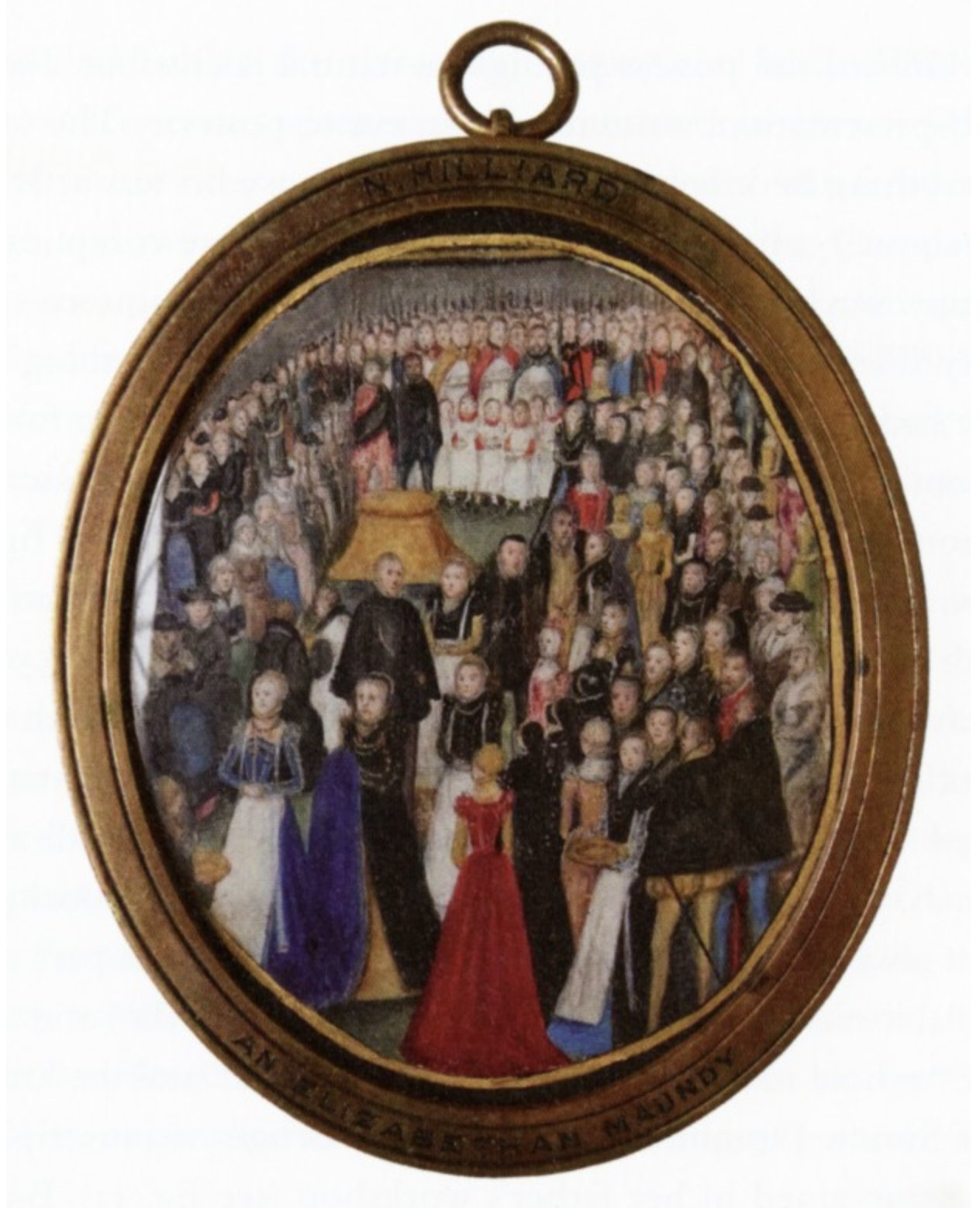
Maundy at court, attributed to Levina Teerlinc, a similar painting was a gift to Mary I.

Mary Finch gave Queen Mary I a red satin purse containing twelve gold half sovereign coins as a New Years Day gift for 1557. Sybil Penn, who had been Edward VI's nurse, gave Mary I six handkerchiefs edged with gold and silk lace. The artist Levina Teerlinc gave a small painting of the Trinity, and the serjeant painter Nicolas Lizard gave a picture of the Maundy. A surviving miniature painting of the Maundy at court is attributed to Teerlinc, and it has been suggested that her painting was intended as a New Year's Day gift to Elizabeth I.

== Elizabethan gifts ==
In January 1552, Elizabeth bought 74 ounces of gilt plate for gifts from Thomas Crococke. Rewards of money were given to servants who brought gifts to her from Master Aglionby, Lady Cheke, Lady Oxford, the Marquess of Winchester, the Chancellor of the Augmentations, and the Lord Privy Seal. Master Wheeler brought a gift from Edward VI and received £4 in reward. The plate distributed by Elizabeth was made by Robert Brandon, Affabel Partridge, Hugh Kayle, Richard Martin and others.

Mary Radcliffe, a maid of honour, was said to have been presented to Elizabeth I in January 1561 by her father as if she were a New Year's Day gift. She joined the household in 1564 and received an annual salary or stipend of £40.

The Spanish ambassador Guerau de Espés described a New Year's Day gift presented by the Earl of Leicester to Elizabeth in January 1571. The gift was a jewel with an enamelled scene showing Elizabeth enthroned and Mary, Queen of Scots, in chains. Neptune bowed to Elizabeth. For Espés, this device was typical of English boasting and bravado and signalled a need for caution and the need to take advantage of opportunity and artifice for the preservation of Spanish power.

Evidence of the importance of gift giving can be found in the letters of Rowland Whyte, who reported the success of presents when charting the current royal favour enjoyed by courtiers including the Robert Devereux, 2nd Earl of Essex and Lady Leicester. In 1582, Thomas Heneage presented Elizabeth with a jewel depicting a "fish prison" on behalf of Christopher Hatton. Heneage described Elizabeth's conversation, a verbal game alluding to fish, flesh, and water, and said she wore it in acceptance. In 1587, the Earl of Essex gave a jewel featuring a rainbow over two pillars, one broken. A cracked pillar was perhaps a reference to the death of Philip Sidney, intended to promote the idea that Essex was now the leading proponent of chivalry at Elizabeth's court, a pillar of chivalry.

In January 1600, Elizabeth ignored a gift from the Earl of Essex who was out of favour. Robert Cecil was conspicuous as gift giver, and gave Elizabeth seven sprigs of gold set with precious stones, and a jewel made like a hunter's horn.

=== Costume gifts ===
The gift rolls from the reign of Elizabeth include various costume accessories such as scarves, petticoats, mantles, girdles, caps, and handkerchiefs, frequently embroidered and enriched with silks, gold thread and jewels.

In January 1562, Sybil Penn gave Elizabeth I a pair of "silk knytt hoose". These were knitted silk stockings, and in subsequent years were supplied by the queen's silkwoman Alice Montague. Clement Adams, father of Robert Adams surveyor of the Queen's works, gave a pattern for the embroidery of a pair of sleeves.

Elizabeth I wearing a doublet given by Robert Dudley, 1st Earl of Leicester, Reading Museum

In 1575, Robert Dudley, 1st Earl of Leicester gave the queen a doublet of white satin garnished with goldsmith's work and 18 gold clasps set with diamonds and rubies. He commissioned a portrait of Elizabeth wearing the doublet to display at Kenilworth Castle. The portrait is now held by Reading Museum. Courtiers increasingly thought that elaborate clothing could make better gifts than plate. Anthony Wingfield, an usher, wrote to his wife Elizabeth Wingfield that "fantastical things will be more accepted than cup or jewel". In 1576, Bess of Hardwick and the Earl of Shrewsbury gave Elizabeth I a gown, having given a gold bowl in 1575. Bess's half-sister, Elizabeth Wingfield (who was Mother of the Maids at court), wrote to the Shrewsburys describing the Queen's positive reaction to the gown:

her majesty never liked any thing you gave her so well, the colour and strange trimming of the garments with the rich and great cost bestowed upon that hath caused her to give out such good speeches of my Lord and your Ladyship as I never heard of better

Some items of clothing recorded on the gift rolls can be cross-referenced with entries in the queen's inventories. Among loose gowns or night gowns listed in an inventory now held by the Folger Shakespeare Library, two were given in 1584 and 1585 by "Baroness Paget Cary" (Katherine, a daughter of Henry Knyvet), another presented by Mary Scudamore in 1585, one by Henry Brouncker in 1588, and a night gown of silver was a gift from Mary and John Scudamore in 1599.

In 1585, the Earl of Leicester gave a sable skin or fur dressed with a jewelled gold head and feet, an item known today by its Italian name as a zibellino. Elizabeth Snowe gave toothpicks and toothcloths. In January 1600, Dorothy Speckard, a silkwoman at the English court, gave a head veil of striped network, flourished with carnation silk and embroidered with metallic "oes", and Elizabeth Brydges, a maid of honour, presented a doublet of network lawn, cut and tufted up with white knit-work, flourished with silver.

Food was also a suitable gift, in 1562 Lady Yorke gave Elizabeth three sugar loaves and a barrel of sucket. A bible, bound in crimson velvet embroidered with pearls, given to Elizabeth in 1584 by the printer Christopher Barker is now held by the Bodleian Library.

=== Diplomats and aristocrats ===
Elizabeth also gave gifts to ambassadors, and the gift roll for January 1585 includes silver plate weighing 545 ounces given to Lewis Bellenden and 135 ounces to the Master of Gray, who had been involved in the negotiations around the Association of Mary, Queen of Scots, and James VI.

Beyond the royal court, evidence survives of New Year's day gift giving in aristocratic households. In 1576, Gilbert Talbot, who was staying at Goodrich Castle, sent his father, the Earl of Shrewsbury, locally made gifts of a Monmouth cap, Ross boots, and perry. Mary, Queen of Scots, imprisoned at Sheffield in 1580, asked her ally James Beaton, Archbishop of Glasgow, to send her items of gold jewellery from Paris for her to give as tokens and New Year's Day gifts. She had not been able to acquire as many gifts as she would have liked to give in previous years.

== James VI and I in Scotland ==
The burgh council of Edinburgh gave gifts to the monarch, and money to the porters at the gate of Holyrood Palace. The town treasurers Alexander Park, Robert Glen, and John Weston were sent to Leith to buy three tun barrels of the "best wyne" and wax torches for Mary, Queen of Scots. In 1577, James VI presented small gold rings to his companions at Stirling Castle as his first New Year's Day gifts.

Anne of Denmark's New Year's Day gifts to James VI in 1591 included a fine grey castor hat garnished with gold and lined with blue velvet. The Edinburgh goldsmith and financier Thomas Foulis supplied jewels to James VI to serve as New Year's Day gifts. The 1595 gifts were a ruby and pearl carcan (a collar or necklace), a pearl chain, a gold tablet set with precious stones, an emerald ring, a ring with eleven diamonds, and seven other rings, costing in total £1,335 Scots. Foulis had previously supplied James with jewels for gifts while working with his former master, the goldsmith Michael Gilbert.

Some recipient's names in 1596 were listed, a gold salamander studded with diamonds was given to the Master of Work, William Schaw. Anne of Denmark received a diamond set gold locket or tablet with a diamond and ruby necklace. Sir Thomas Erskine had a locket set with rubies and diamonds, the Duke of Lennox had a hat badge in the shape of a diamond set gold crown, and a courtier known as the "Little Dutchman" (possibly William Belo) received a diamond ring. A precept signed by King James for similar jewels supplied by Foulis to serve as gifts in January 1597 also survives.

James VI gave the goldsmith George Heriot £400 sterling from his English subsidy for New Year's day gifts in 1600 or 1601. Heriot supplied a jewel costing £1,333 Scots to King James for Anne of Denmark's 1602 New Year's Day gift. The Scottish treasurer's accounts mention that a horse was hired to take a New Year's Day gift to Prince Henry at Stirling and to Princess Elizabeth at Linlithgow Palace.

== Stuart court in England ==
After the Union of the Crowns in 1603, jewels were prominently featured in the January masque entertainments at court, starting with the 1604 The Masque of Indian and China Knights at Hampton Court. In the performance, William Herbert, 3rd Earl of Pembroke, gave an expensive jewel to the king, but in reality James had the jewel on approval from the financier Peter Vanlore. The silver plate given by James in 1604 was supplied by John Williams.

An account book for 1604 written by Princess Elizabeth (or her companion Anne Livingstone) records the purchases of gifts for the Harington household at Coombe Abbey, including "four ear rings at fifteen pennies the piece" that were "given at new year's day to my lady Harington's women", and rings bought for the dancing master and writing master, with gifts for "Lady Harington's officemen", including the pantry man and the buttery man.

In 1606, the court physician John Craig gave King James a marchpane and four boxes of dry confections, Doctor John Hammond gave a pot of green ginger, their colleague Henry Atkins gave King James a pot of orange flowers, and Martin Schöner presented a box of confections. As had been the custom of Elizabeth's court, the musicians, including Nicholas Lanier the Elder and Rowland Rubbish, gave pairs of perfumed gloves.

Arbella Stuart's letters give an insight into anxiety around gift giving. Elizabeth I had given her a disappointing gift in 1601, thought to be worth much less than the present she gave the queen. When Arbella sent a New Year's Day gift to Robert Cecil in 1604, he reciprocated with a "fair pair of bracelets".

Arbella recommended that Mary Talbot, Countess of Shrewsbury take advice from Margaret Hartsyde, one of the Scottish chamberers serving Anne of Denmark. She thought Hartsyde could discreetly inquire what the queen wanted, to know her "mind without knowing who asked it", without spoiling any surprise. Anne "regarded not the value, but the device", apparently the thought mattered more. Arbella heard that Anne would prefer ear rings rather than costly gowns or petticoats. Mary, Countess of Shrewsbury, gave Bess of Hardwick a cushion based on the embroidered patterns of her daughter the Countess of Arundel's bed hangings.

Despite Anne of Denmark's reputed preference for jewels, an inventory of Anne of Denmark's clothes lists elaborately embroidered petticoats or skirts, gifts in January 1609 and 1610 from King James, her chamberlain Lord Lisle, and her servant Mary Gargrave. The Countess of Nottingham gave a petticoat embroidered with fruit bats. Bats had featured in a 1607 court entertainment, Lord Hay's Masque. King James gave Anne an unusually costly diamond ring in January 1613, for which Stephen Some and Isaac Sutton were paid £1,200.

The French ambassador Antoine Lefèvre de la Boderie referred to le jour des étrennes when describing gifts given to Benjamin, Duke of Soubise, in January 1609. The jewellery was supplied by William Kindt. In January 1610, Thomas Howard, 1st Earl of Suffolk gave Anne a petticoat embroidered with arches, pyramids, and wild beasts. In 1619, he and his wife, the Countess of Suffolk, with their associate Sir John Bingley were charged with corruption, for taking bribes to expedite exchequer payments. They claimed that they had innocently received New Year's Day gifts, but the trial lawyer Francis Bacon declared "new years gifts did not last all the year".

On 31 December 1616, Lady Anne Clifford sent a sweet bag for perfume to Anne of Denmark and a standish inkwell to "Mrs Hanno". For New Year's Day 1619, Clifford sent a cushion of cloth of silver, embroidered with the royal arms of Denmark, and decorated with "slips of tent stitch". A slip was a rectangle of linen with embroidered motifs. The cushion may have been intended to complement a silver bed with the Danish arms owned by the Queen.

On 1 January 1623, King James gave the Duchess of Richmond a "collar with letters" and a chain of gold with diamonds and pearls to the Countess of Buckingham.

In December 1636, Dorothy Sidney, Countess of Leicester, wrote from Penshurst Place to her lawyer and agent William Hawkins, explaining she had sent one of her servants to buy and deliver her gift to Charles I. Hawkins was to pay the servant £500 for the gift. The Countess of Leicester reported that in January 1639, the Earl of Holland gave her sister, the Countess of Carlisle, a diamond bracelet which cost £1,500, worth more than any of the "fine things" given by courtiers to Henrietta Maria. Charles I's gift to Henrietta Maria cost £6,000. In December 1640, the Countess of Leicester was in Paris, and Lucy, Countess of Carlisle, asked her to buy jewels, plate, or "stuff" (fabric) for a New Year's Day gift, because there was nothing she liked in the London shops.

== Literary gifts ==
Some courtiers or poets adjacent to the court wrote verses in the manner of New Year's Day gifts. The Scottish poet Alexander Scott presented Ane New Yeir Gift to Quene Mary at New Year in 1562.

In 1602, John Harington sent a lantern and a poem as a New Year's Day gift to James VI in Scotland. With a theme looking forward to James's succession to the English throne, Harington alluded to the imprisonment of David II of Scotland at Nottingham Castle. Harington repackaged his verses as a gift to Prince Henry for the king's birthday in 1605.

James Howell included a New Year's Day gift poem, The Vote, or A Poem-Royal (1641) as a preface to his collection of letters, Epistolae Ho-Elianae: Familiar Letters.

Aristocratic families also wrote gift poems. William Cecil wrote a poem for his daughter Anne to accompany the gift of a spinning wheel in 1567. Rachel Fane made a New Year’s Day gift poem for her mother Mary Mildmay Fane, Countess of Westmorland, apparently for January 1627. Esther Inglis made and gave illuminated manuscript books, possibly seeking aristocratic patronage.

== See also ==
- Enkutatash
- Cervula
- Strenua
