= Alexander Murray of Drumdewan =

Scottish soldier

Alexander Murray of Drumdewan (died 1599) was a Scottish courtier and soldier.

He was a younger son of William Murray of Tullibardine and Agnes Graham, a daughter of William Graham, 2nd Earl of Montrose and Janet Keith. William Murray was a Master of the Household to James VI of Scotland. His aunt was the influential Annabell Murray, Countess of Mar.

His own lands were at Drumdewan, near Dull, Perth and Kinross. He was made a gentleman of the king's forechamber in June 1580.

He took over a command in the Dutch service from his brother William Murray of Pitcairlie in 1588.

His nieces, Anne Murray and Lilias Murray were ladies in waiting to Anne of Denmark, the wife of James VI. On 15/25 September 1594, Anne of Denmark met two Dutch ambassadors, Walraven III van Brederode and Jacob Valck, and recommended the services of Alexander Murray to them.

He commanded a regiment for Prince Maurice at the Battle of Turnhout (1597). He was killed at the siege of Bommel on 19 May 1599.
