= The Tabard =

English inn in Southwark, London (1307–1676)

Coordinates: 51°30′14″N 0°5′23″W

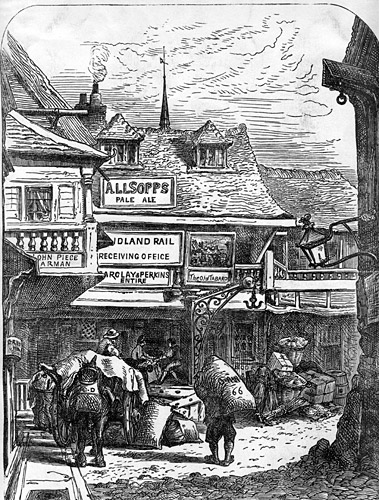
The Tabard Inn, Southwark, around 1850; since demolished

The Tabard was an inn in Southwark established in 1307, which stood on the east side of Borough High Street, at the road's intersection with the ancient thoroughfare to Canterbury and Dover. It was built for the Abbot of Hyde in Winchester, who purchased the land to construct a place for himself and his ecclesiastical brethren to stay when on business in London.

The Tabard was famous for accommodating people who made the pilgrimage to the Shrine of Thomas Becket in Canterbury Cathedral, and it is mentioned in the 14th-century literary work The Canterbury Tales by Geoffrey Chaucer.

== Early history ==
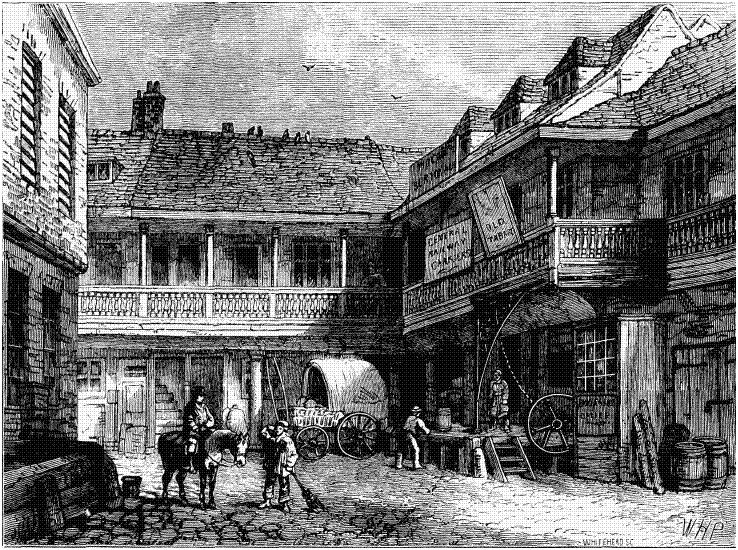
Just before it was demolished in 1873

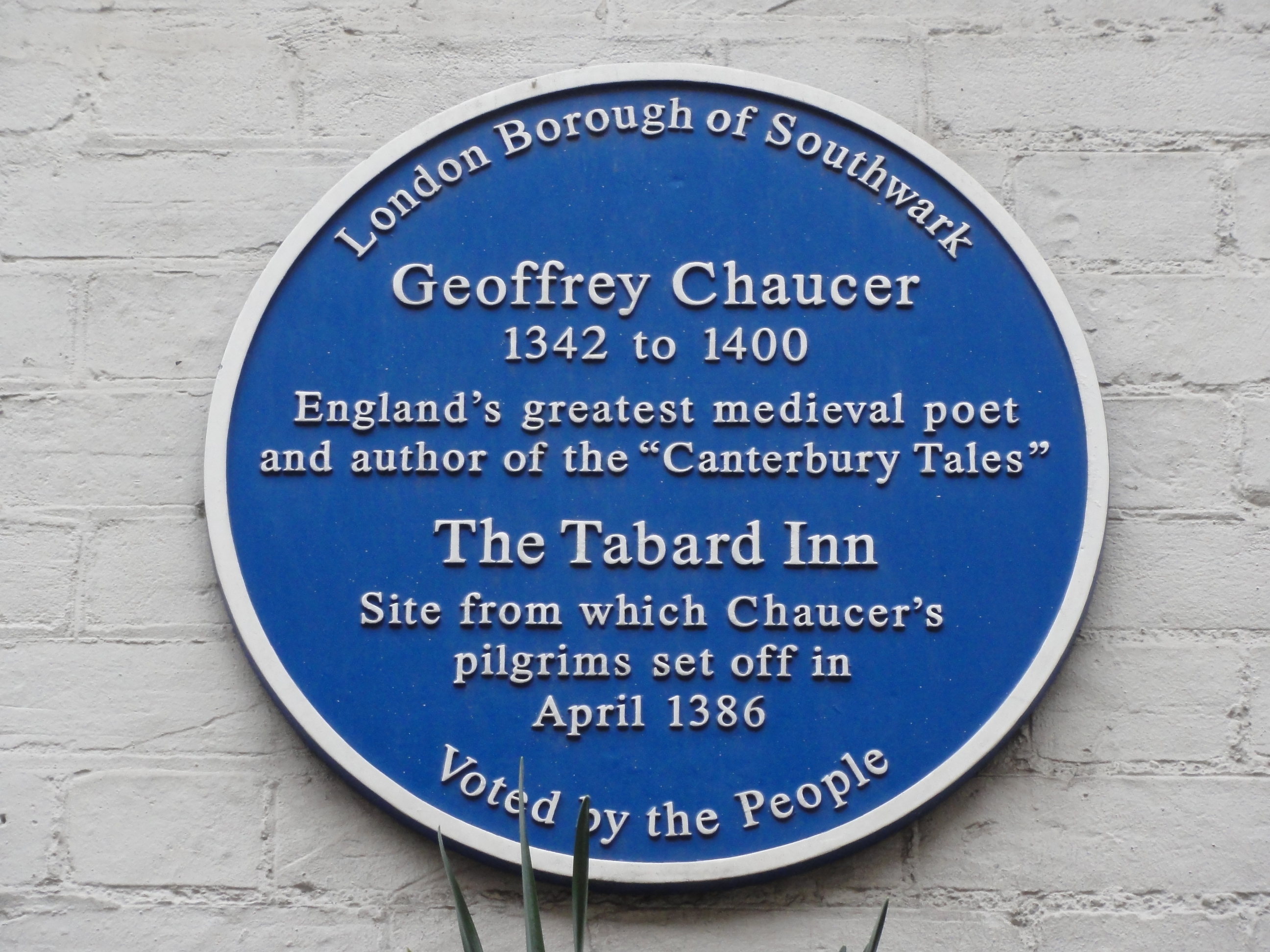
Blue Plaque on site in Talbot Yard

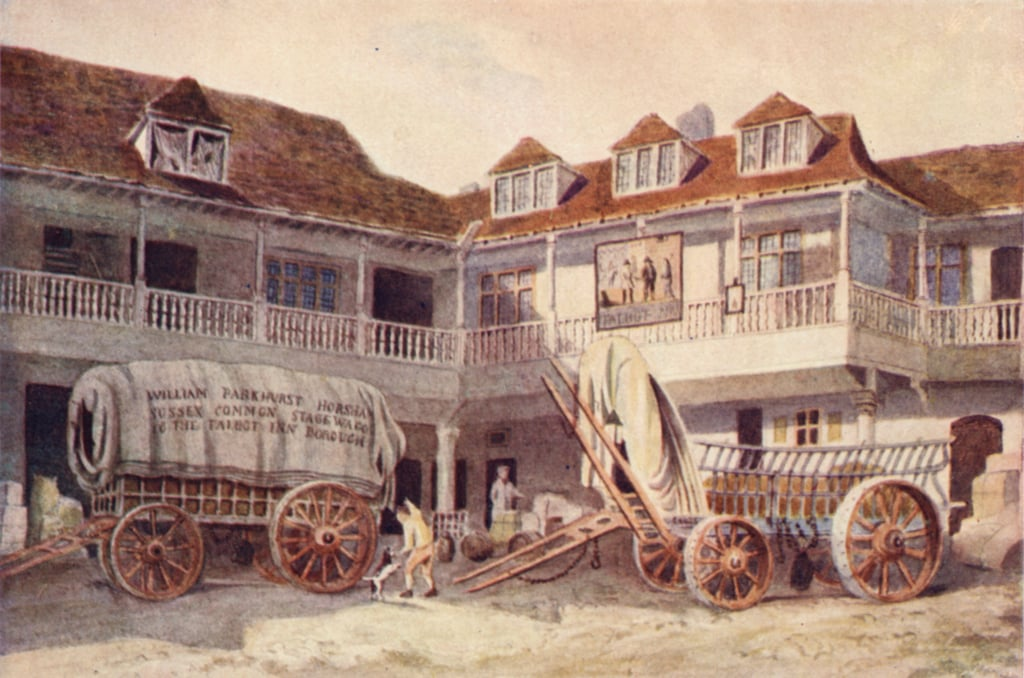
Tabard Inn Southwark 1810 by Philip Norman

The inn was located on the south bank of the Thames, just north of where the two Roman roads of Stane Street and Watling Street merged. It stood near the Manor of Southwark, controlled by the Bishops of Winchester. Also known as the Liberty of Winchester, the manor lay outside the jurisdiction of the City of London. Activities that were forbidden within the City of London and the county of Surrey, including prostitution and animal baiting, were permitted within Southwark, which thus became medieval London's entertainment district. In those times, the Tabard would have been filled with pilgrims, drunks, travellers, criminals, and prostitutes (colloquially known as the "Winchester Geese").

Chaucer wrote that the Tabard was the location where the pilgrims first met on their journey to Canterbury in the 1380s. The inn's proprietor was a man named Harry Bailey:

Bifel that in that season on a day,
In Southwerk at the Tabard as I lay
Redy to wenden on my pilgrymage
To Caunterbury with ful devout corage,
At nyght was come into that hostelrye
Wel nyne and twenty in a compaignye
Of sondry folk, by aventure yfalle
In felaweshipe, and pilgrimes were they alle,
That toward Caunterbury wolden ryde;
The chambres and the stables weren wyde,
And well we weren esed atte beste;

The antiquary John Stow wrote in his Survey that by the 16th century it was among several inns at this location in Southwark: "many fair inns, for receipt of travellers, by these signs: the Spurre, Christopher, Bull, Queen's Head, Tabard, George, Hart, King's Head" &c.

Following the Dissolution of the Monasteries in the mid-16th century, "the Tabard of the Monastery of Hyde, and the Abbot's Place, with the stable and gardens thereunto belonging" were sold to John and Thomas Master. The goldsmith John Mabbe (died 1582) acquired the inn. His son Robert Mabbe pledged a share of the inn to the goldsmith Affabel Partridge for a loan.

The layout of the Tabard Inn was described in a lease in 1540, and in a legal dispute, Partridge v. Mabbe, in 1601. Named rooms in 1601 included a parlour, the dark parlour, a hall, the chamber called the "flower de luce", a kitchen, the cook's lofts, and oven house.

== Destruction and replacement ==
On 26 May 1676, ten years after the Great Fire of London, a great blaze started in Southwark. The Tabard was among many buildings that were either burned down or pulled down to create fire breaks. The blaze, which took 17 hours to contain, destroyed most of medieval Southwark. King Charles II and his brother the Duke of York were both involved in the firefighting effort. Although the medieval building was destroyed, the site was immediately rebuilt and renamed The Talbot.

== Closure ==
In the early 18th century, the new inn was profiting from the growth in stagecoach traffic between London and the channel ports because of the growth in turnpikes. By the early 19th century, the Talbot remained a well-renowned coaching inn. However, with the advent of the railways, it eventually closed. The building was then converted into stores. It was demolished in 1873.

== See also ==
- The George Inn, Southwark, a surviving nearby coaching inn
- White Hart, Southwark, a demolished nearby coaching inn
