= Battle of Turnhout (1597) =

1597 battle

- Part of the Eighty Years' & Anglo-Spanish Wars
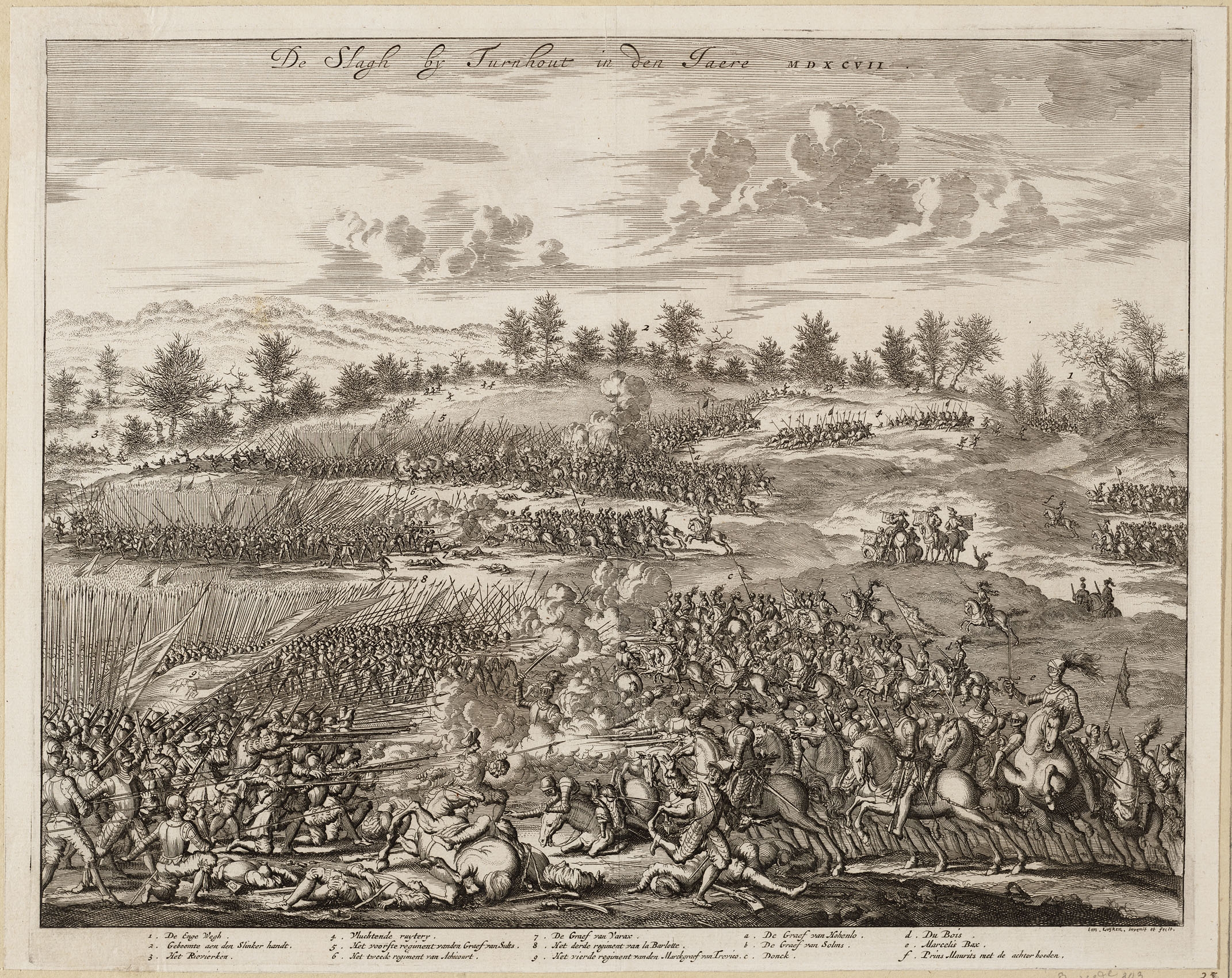
- The battle of Turnhout in 1597. Engraving by Jan Luyken
Date	24 January 1597
Location	Near Turnhout, Southern Netherlands (now in modern-day Belgium)
Result	Anglo-Dutch victory

Belligerents
(Spain) Spanish Empire	Dutch Republic; England

Commanders and leaders
(Spain) Philibert de Rye, Count Varax † (Spain) Nicolo Basta	(Dutch Republic) Maurice of Nassau (Kingdom of England) Sir Francis Vere

Strength
4,000 infantry, 500 cavalry	800 cavalry

Casualties and losses
2,000 killed & wounded, 500 to 700 captured	12 killed, 50 wounded

The Battle of Turnhout, also known as the Battle of Tielenheide, was fought on 24 January 1597 by allied forces of the Dutch Republic and the Kingdom of England against those of the Spanish Empire. The battle took place near Turnhout in the Southern Netherlands (now in modern-day Belgium), and was part of the Eighty Years' War and the concurrent Anglo-Spanish War (1585–1604).

The engagement occurred as the Spanish were withdrawing ahead of an impending Dutch and English attack on their winter quarters in Turnhout (which did not have defensive walls), to Herentals, the nearest fortified town, 17 kilometres (11 mi) to the southwest. The vanguard of the allied army caught up with the Spanish column en route to Herentals, and after some skirmishing, both armies confronted each other on a heath called Tielenheide. The Spanish cavalry was driven off, after which the English and Dutch cavalry fell upon the disordered Spanish infantry who were routed with heavy casualties.

== Background ==
After the successful attack on Cadiz in 1596, the English forces allied to the Dutch led by Sir Francis Vere were urgently required back in the Netherlands and went there directly. The severe damage from the raid contributed to the bankruptcy of Spain for the third time, which meant that payments to their armies dried up, leading to frequent mutinies. In addition, many Spanish troops had been sent from the Spanish Netherlands to France by Philip II of Spain to assist the Catholic League in the French Wars of Religion.

During the winter of 1596/1597 Archduke Albert's Spanish army of 4,500 under the command of the Burgundian Philibert de Rye, Count Varax, had advanced to the town of Turnhout, about 30 kilometres (19 mi) south of the Dutch city of Breda; their design was to surprise the town of Tholen in a rare winter offensive.

Varax had under his command four infantry units: the Tercio of Naples led by the Marquis of Treviso, the Germans under the Count of Sulz, and two Walloon and Burgundian regiments under the Comtes de Hachicourt and de Barlaymont. The cavalry under Nicolo Basta comprised four squadrons of Spanish horse commanded by Juan de Cordova, Alonzo de Mendoza, Juan de Guzman and Alonzo Mondragon, and a Flemish unit under de Grubbendonck. These were split into two units, one of heavy demi-lancers and the other of lighter herreruelos (harquebusiers).

The Dutch Stadtholder, Maurice of Nassau, had received orders from the States General to collect a force at Geertruidenberg to counter this Spanish threat. Though the town was not walled, Turnhout was strategically important - it held a small castle surrounded by a moat and contained a garrison of forty men. A force of nearly 6,800 infantry with two demi-cannons and two field pieces was assembled at Geertruidenberg. Six companies of Dutch infantry were under Maurice, and the counts of Hohenlohe, Brederode, and Solms arrived with contingents gathered from their various garrisons. Vere led the English force once more - nearly two-thirds of Maurice's army were in fact English and Scots. A minority were subsidized allied troops or 'religious volunteers', most of whom were long-term mercenaries sent by Elizabeth I. Among these were Sir Alexander Murray's regiment of Scots, as well as eight companies of English infantry under the command of Captain Henry Docwra. The cavalry totaled 800 men commanded by Marcellus Bacx and included a contingent of one hundred elite cuirassiers made up of volunteers from among the English gentry, 'the gentlemen of the [Protestant] religion', under Sir Robert Sydney and Sir Nicholas Parker.

On the morning of 23 January 1597 the allied army departed Geertruidenberg in four divisions, with the cavalry on the flanks. In a one-day forced march of 38 kilometres (24 mi) in poor road conditions they managed to reach the village of Ravels that evening (5 kilometres (3.1 mi) northeast of Turnhout), and made camp.

At midnight the Dutch and English broke camp and approached the outskirts of Turnhout.

== Battle ==
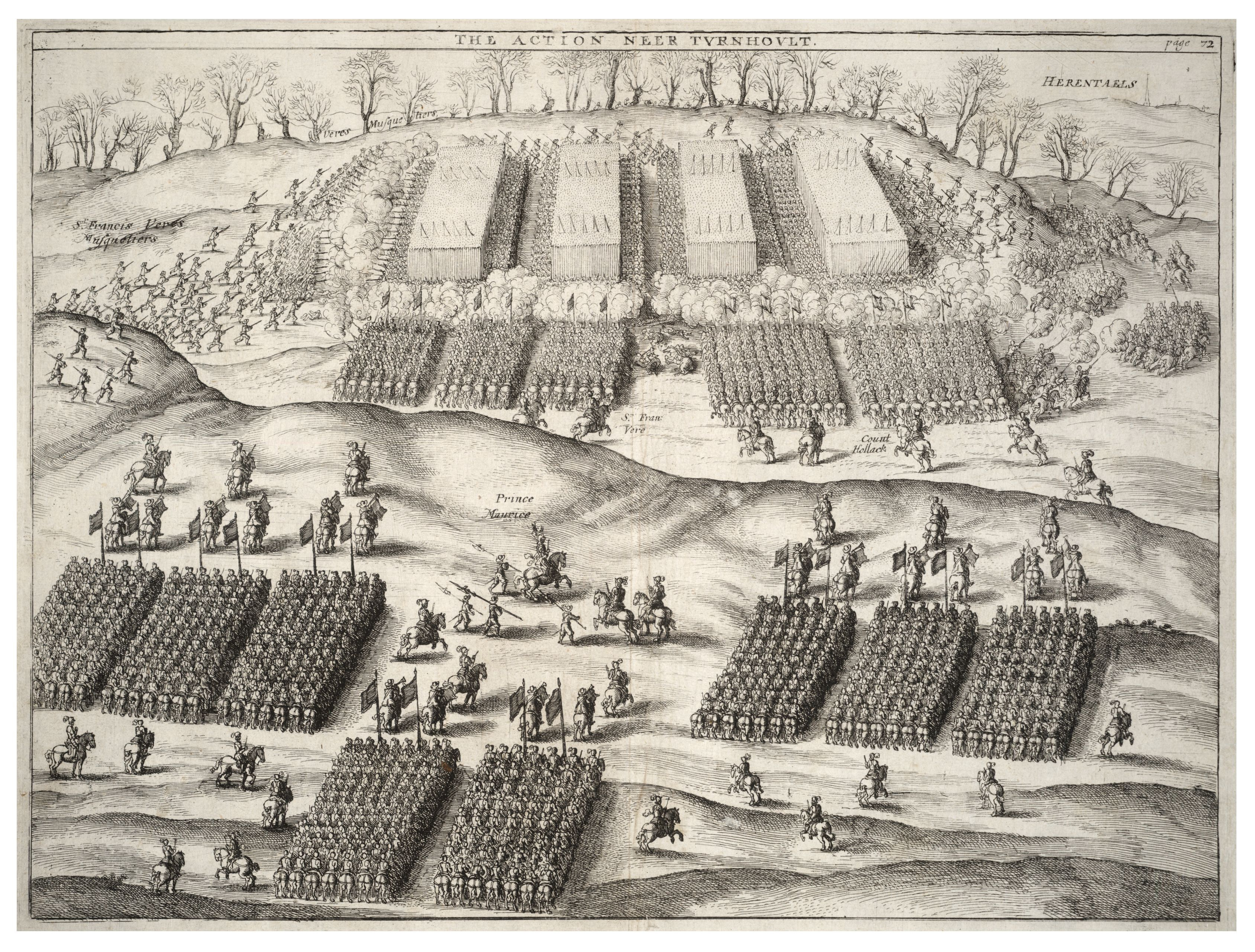
Print of the battle showing the English attacking the Spanish on the left and the Dutch on the right

Varax heard exaggerated reports of the size of Maurice's approaching army; this information and the lack of defensive walls at Turnhout caused him to immediately order a withdrawal south to the fortified town of Herentals. By daybreak of 24 January the whole of the Spanish force was en route to Herentals. Maurice soon discovered that the Spanish rearguard had marched out of the village just before his arrival. The country was intersected in all directions by hedges and ditches and having reached the banks of the river Aa, Varax removed all but one plank from the wooden bridge that crossed it. Parties of Spanish musketeers were stationed on the other side to contest any crossing attempt, but the English advance guard swiftly forced them off.

English carabiniers and musketeers were sent forward to follow and engage the Spanish rearguard and a skirmish ensued which continued for 8 kilometres (5.0 mi). Dutch musketeers crossed the bridge, while others, with the cavalry, traversed the river at a nearby ford. The Spanish were now in full retreat, while Maurice ordered the whole of the Anglo-Dutch cavalry to pursue, leaving his infantry and artillery well behind, struggling with the muddy road.

Having come across a large wood further on from the river, Vere called up his detached musketeers and placed them along the edges to conceal them. These skirmishers kept up a constant harassing fire on the Spanish rearguard, while Vere along with sixteen horsemen followed them along the highway in full sight and at the same time sent back a report to Maurice to come up in support. Vere had his horse shot from under him which slightly wounded his leg, but continued to lead on foot, until he was remounted. This skirmish between the Anglo-Dutch scouting force and the Spanish rearguard lasted for over three hours until the main body of the former's cavalry arrived. The Spanish had by then emerged onto the Tielenheide, an open heath suitable for cavalry action.

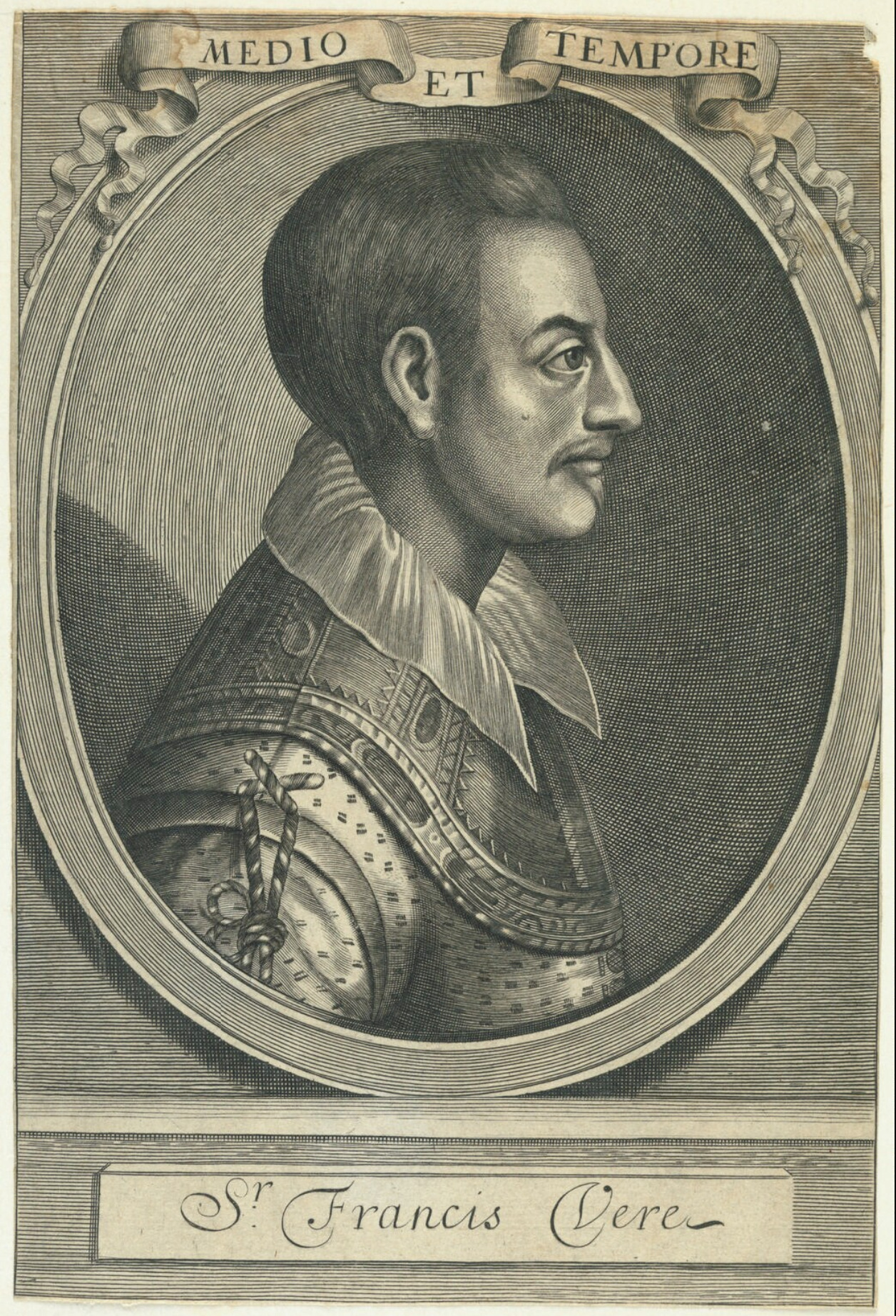
Sir Francis Vere

Varax formed his infantry in four solid squares of pikemen in column in the open space of the heath as they marched south, with musketeers on the flanks as was standard practice for the Spanish. His cavalry and wagons had entered an enclosed lane beyond the heath. The first square consisted of Germans led by the Count of Sulz, followed by the Walloons and Burgundians. The Marquis of Treviso brought up the rear with the veteran Spanish and Italian troops. Vere continued to follow them, until all of Maurice's cavalry had joined with him having emerged from the wood. The Anglo-Dutch then formed on the heath in front of the Spanish.

The Spanish steadily continued their march but as they became aware of the allied movements on their left, their cavalry changed position and transferred from the right to the left of the line and rode between the infantry and the belt of woods. After the first volley by Vere's musketeers the Spanish harquebusiers on foot broke and fled. Varax ordered his cavalry to cover the retreat but Count Hohenlohe and his Dutch cavalry charged the Spanish right flank, as Vere followed suit upon their rear. Hohenlohe fell upon Sulz's regiment of Germans while Vere's English and Bacx's Dutch cavalry assailed the Spanish rearguard. The surprise was complete; the Spanish cavalry which included the famed squadrons of Guzman, Mondragon, and Mendoza were hit hard at the first onset and within moments retreated for the opening of the enclosed lane. Most of them escaped through this into the boggy ground beyond. Several companies of Parker's cavalry galloped down the Herentals road, in pursuit of the Spanish cavalry and baggage.

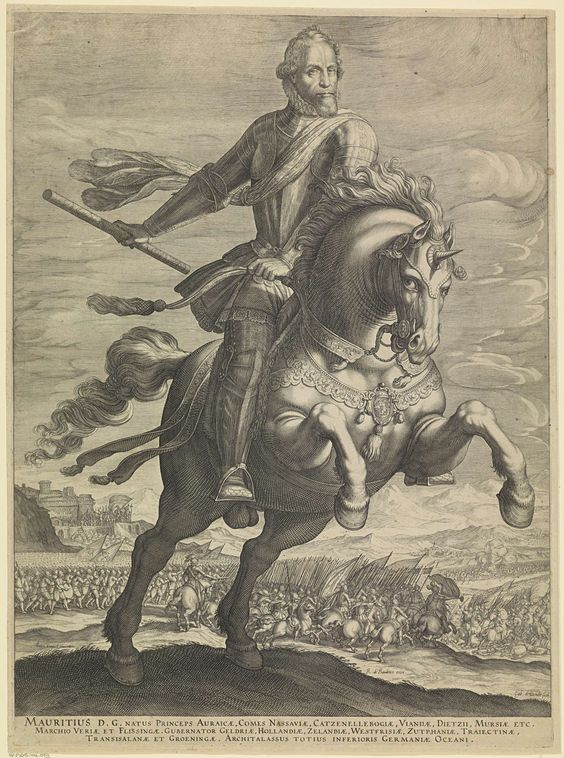
Equestrian portrait of Maurice, Prince of Orange at the Battle of Turnhout by Egbert van Panderen

With the Spanish cavalry having been driven off, the Dutch and English cavalry fell upon the disordered Spanish infantry. The Walloon regiments tried to form a line with the flank protected by a copse, but their morale was already low after witnessing the flight of their cavalry. When they saw in the distance the mass of Dutch infantry approaching to support their cavalry they broke and tried to swim across the Aa river to reach Herentals. The musketeers of Sultz's regiment fell back in confusion upon the pikemen behind them and the whole formation promptly surrendered en masse upon being charged by the Anglo-Dutch cavalry. The veteran tercio under Treviso managed to deploy in combat formation and resisted manfully for some time, but Vere and Bacx's charge upon them was decisive. The Dutch and English troopers rode up very close to the massed ranks of the Spanish infantry and discharged their pistols and carbines at point-blank range, inflicting carnage. Varax, fighting in the front line with his men, was among the casualties. The cuirassiers' fire opened gaps within the Spanish ranks into which the troopers rode in and started attacking the formation from within, rapidly causing a rout.

While the veteran Spanish troops were fighting, the surviving Germans in the front and the other infantry in the rear had been simultaneously shattered and the panicked survivors swamped the two other regiments, those of Hachicourt and La Barlotte which were placed between them, masking their fire and spreading panic among them. The English and Dutch soon broke these formations as well and put nearly all of the Spanish infantry to flight. The pursuing cavalry harried them and the Spanish infantry were "cut down with terrible slaughter". Parker's cavalry had in the meantime gone through the enclosed lane and plundered the Spanish baggage train. The Spanish had been completely routed and the battle had lasted no more than half an hour.

The remnants of the Spanish force managed to retreat to Herentals where Nicolo Basta took command and rallied the survivors.

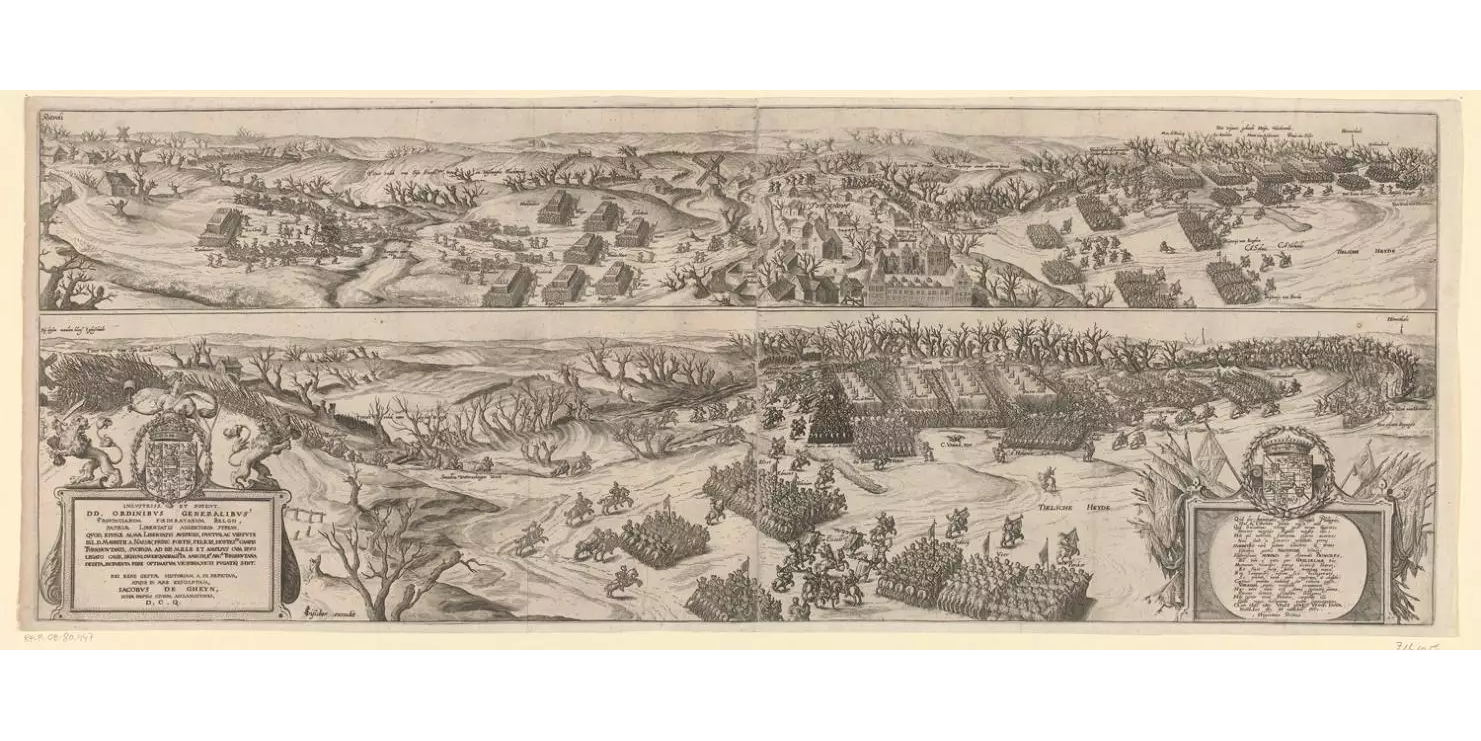
Print of the Battle of Turnhout by Bartholomeus Dolendo Top: The advancing army under Maurice in pursuit of Spanish troops from Ravels via Turnhout to the Tielenheide. Bottom: The battle on the Tielenheide and the fleeing Spanish cavalry.

== Aftermath ==
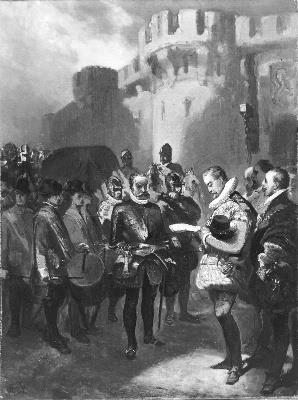
Prince Maurice returns Varax's corpse after battle of Turnhout

Out of 4,000 Spanish soldiers and 500 horsemen nearly half were casualties; 2000 were killed or wounded. In addition thirty-eight ensigns were taken and prisoners numbered around 600. Of the allied force only fifty were casualties including ten killed. The whole action was won by around 800 Dutch and English horsemen and the majority of the Dutch infantry were never brought into action. That night the victors rested in Turnhout; the next morning the castle there capitulated and the Dutch promptly burned parts of it. However, Maurice had to leave the town after several days before the arrival of Spanish reinforcements led by the Archduke Albert, including the Spanish infantry of Francisco Velasco and several cavalry units, joined by the survivors of the battle. The allied force then began their return march to Geertruidenberg. The victory at Turnhout therefore did not result in any long-term strategic gain as there was no follow up.

On 8 February Maurice returned to The Hague - the captured Spanish flags were displayed in the Ridderzaal (the political headquarters of the States General) as a symbol of victory. The prisoners were treated with kindness and the wounded were cared for, and the body of Varax was sent to the Archduke. In return Albert assured the Stadtholder that he would follow his generous example for the duration of the war. The English under Vere and Sidney greatly distinguished themselves. Vere accompanied Sidney to Willemstad, wrote his official despatches and gave them to one of Sidney's captains to deliver in England. Both generals spoke generously of each other - Vere thought that Sidney excelled in battle, being one of the first that charged. Sidney reported that the victory was only due to Vere.

News of the victory was received in England with great rejoicing, and congratulations poured in on all sides. The satirist Stephen Gosson composed a sermon called the Trumpet of Warre a justification of war with Spain. The battle was even dramatised in London, and introduced on the stage known as the Overthrow of Turnholt. All of the officers who were present at the battle were impersonated.

He that played Sir Francis Vere got a beard resembling his, and a watchet satin doublet with hose trimmed with silver lace. Sidney and the others were among the dramatis personæ, and honorable mention was made of their services in seconding Sir Francis.

Queen Elizabeth I of England herself wrote to Vere on February 7, 1597, in the following terms:

It is no news to hear, by the late defeat at Turnhout, that your presence and that of the other English in the service, has furthered both your own reputation and its success: yet we wish to signify our good liking of the report we hear of your services.

=== Analysis ===
At the time the battle was of great importance for the evolution of mounted warfare for two reasons:

The first impact was that Maurice's army had demonstrated the superiority of the new type of cavalry, the cuirassiers or reiters, as used by Henry IV of France at the battle of Ivry. The cuirassiers wore half-armour and a light helmet and were armed with several pistols but also carried carbines as well as a sword. No lances were carried, so instead of being arrayed in a thin line (en haye) to maximize the number of lances being deployed they charged in dense formations (eight ranks deep) and fired their pistols only at the moment of contact. This tactic, which had already defeated French gendarmes (lancers in full armour) at Ivry, proved to be effective as well against the lighter Spanish demi-lancers.

The second impact was that the Dutch and English cuirassiers, with the support of a few hundred musketeers, had destroyed a Spanish tercio without the help of their own heavy infantry. These lessons on the value of the cuirassiers were quickly learned and most European armies abandoned the use of lancers soon after, with only the Poles retaining them within their famed husaria. The Spaniards finally drew their own conclusions after their defeat at Nieuwpoort three years later.

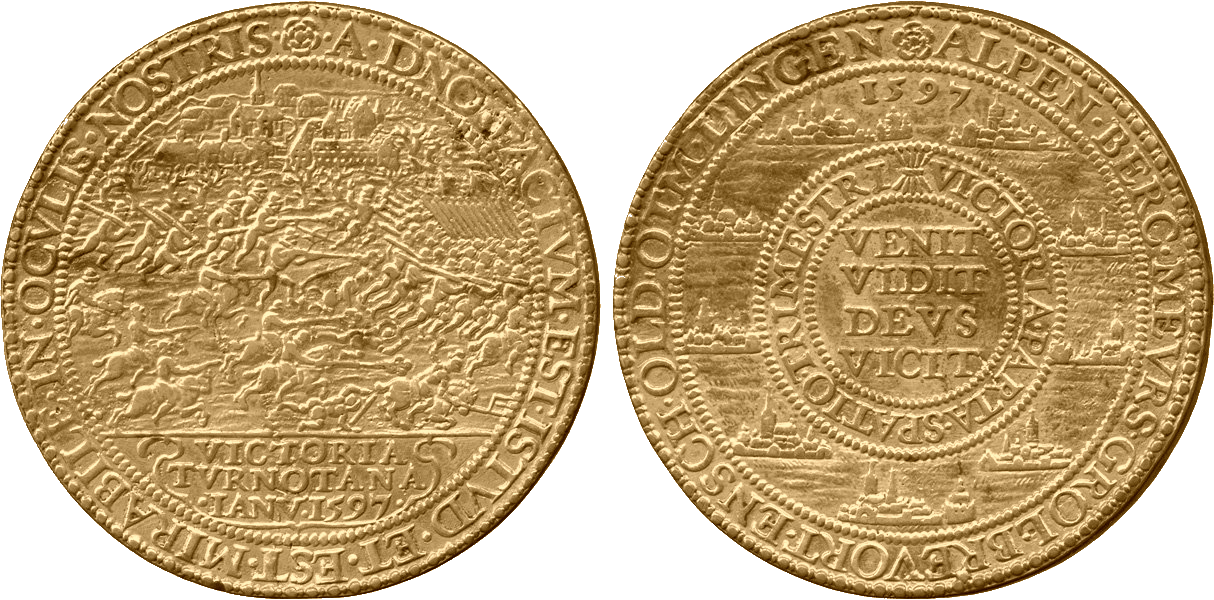
A commemorative Dutch medallion made after the battle in 1597 - The Battle of Turnhout and Spanish defeats, by Prince Maurice of Nassau (front), 1597, by Gerhard van Bijlaer. The troops of Prince Maurice chase after the Spanish (reverse).

== Cultural ==
Music composer Kevin Houben commemorated the battle in his concert work, Thyellene: The Battle on the Heath. In September 2008, Brassband Kempenzonen Tielen played this work on the site where once the battle took place.

The victory at Turnhout inspired the writing of the Dutch hymn We Gather Together.

== Bibliography ==
- Dunthorne, Hugh (2013). Britain and the Dutch Revolt, 1560-1700. Cambridge University Press. ISBN 9780521837477.
- Eysturlid, Lee W; Coetzee, Daniel, eds. (2013). Philosophers of War: The Evolution of History's Greatest Military Thinkers (2 Volumes). ABC-CLIO. ISBN 9780313070334.
- Fissel, Mark Charles (2001). English warfare, 1511–1642; Warfare and history. London: Routledge. ISBN 978-0-415-21481-0.
- Gosman, Martin; Peeters, Joop W. Koopmans, eds. (2007). Selling and Rejecting Politics in Early Modern Europe Volume 25 of Groningen studies in cultural change. Peeters Publishers. ISBN 9789042918764.
- Hadfield, Andrew; Hammond, Paul, eds. (2014). Shakespeare And Renaissance Europe, Arden Critical Companions. A&C Black. ISBN 9781408143698.
- Markham, Clement (2007). The Fighting Veres: Lives Of Sir Francis Vere And Sir Horace Vere. Kessinger Publishing. ISBN 978-1432549053.
- Van der Hoeven, Marco (1997). Exercise of arms: warfare in the Netherlands, 1568-1648. New York: BRILL. ISBN 90-04-10727-4.
- León, Fernando González de (2009). The Road to Rocroi: Class, Culture and Command in the Spanish Army of Flanders, 1567-1659 Volume 52 of History of warfare. BRILL. ISBN 9789004170827.
- Manning, Roger B (2006). An Apprenticeship in Arms: The Origins of the British Army 1585-1702. OUP Oxford. ISBN 9780199261499.
- Nolan, Cathal J (2006). The Age of Wars of Religion, 1000-1650: An Encyclopaedia of Global Warfare and Civilization, Volume 2. Greenwood Publishing Group. ISBN 9780313337345.
- Van Nimwegen, Olaf (2010). The Dutch Army and the Military Revolutions, 1588-1688. New York: Boydell & Brewer. ISBN 978-1-84383-575-2.
- Weigley, Rusell Frank (2004). The Age of Battles: The Quest for Decisive Warfare from Breitenfeld to Waterloo. Indiana: Indiana University Press. ISBN 0-253-21707-5.
