= John Mabbe =

John Mabbe or Mab was the name of two English goldsmiths working in Tudor London.

== The Mabbe family ==
The senior John Mabbe (who died in 1582 and was buried at St Matthew Friday Street) was a son of John Mabbe of Chayton in Sussex and his wife Joan Goble. John Mabbe, the goldsmith, married Isabell Colley, and was Chamberlain of London from 1577 until his death. A daughter, Martha Mabbe married Clement Medley of Newstead, Hemsworth. His son John Mabbe the younger married Martha Denham, and they were the parents of another John Mabbe, and possibly the stationer Ralph Mabbe, and James Mabbe, a translator of Spanish literature.

== The Tabard Inn ==
John Mabbe senior appears to be the goldsmith who worked for Princess Mary recorded as "Mabell" by her lady in waiting Mary Finch. He had an interest in the Tabard, Inn, Southwark, and wrote a will in 1578. His son Robert Mabbe, a goldbeater, inherited the property and pledged a share of the inn to the goldsmith Affabel Partridge. Affable Partridge had a daughter, Dionyssus, who married Stephen Mabbe, also a goldsmith and a younger son of John Mabbe senior. The layout of the Tabard Inn was described in a legal dispute, Partridge v. Mabbe, in 1601.

== Jewels in 1576 ==
An inventory of John Mabbe the younger's goldsmith stock in 1576 survives. After making a statute on the quality of gold sold in London, Elizabeth I allowed him to market his existing stock of jewellery made with gold under 22 ct fineness. His stock included jewels with the story of Joshua and Caleb, Charity, Hercules, Narcissus, Julius Caesar, a mermaid, the story of Mars, Venus and Cupid, Phoebus Apollo and Daphne, and the emblem Fama Perennis. A gold tablet or locket with a "Roman burning his hand in fire" told the story of Gaius Mucius Scaevola. There was a gold tortoise with a shell set with 39 topazes and a pendant emerald. He had 224 gold perfumed beads known as pomander beads from the name of the scented compound.

Kim F. Hall notes the representation of Black Africans depicted on gold brooches in Mabbe's 1576 inventory, with cameos of a "Mores-head", a "Blackamoore", and a woman like a "More".
