= Sucket =

Medieval English sweet

Sucket or succat was a kind of confectionary or dessert popular in early modern England, frequently served at banquets with other confectionary. The word is related to succade, which refers to a kind of dried fruit.

== Description ==
The dish was a sweetmeat involving sugar plums and dried fruit or peel in thick syrup flavoured with ginger and other spices. The dried fruits themselves were called "suckets" or "dry suckets". Suckets were moulded to decorative shapes, and a red colour could be achieved by using the juice of barberries. The Elizabethan writer William Harrison disapproved of sucket amongst a list of other "outlandish confections".

Hugh Plat described a sucket made from lettuce stalks in his Delightes for Ladies (1602), with his recipe drawn from a work of recipes and domestic advice compiled from the 1550s to 1580s, now contained in the British Library in Sloane MS 2189. Gervase Markham published a recipe for suckets in The English Huswife (1615). A similar recipe was included in The Accomplish'd Ladies Delight, in Preserving, Physick, Beautifying, and Cookery (1675), a work published with an attribution to Hannah Wolley. Markham also listed wet, then dry suckets in a sequence of banqueting dishes.

From the 16th century, confectioners in Colchester made sucket from the sea holly that grew along the coast. C. Anne Wilson describes suckets made from such sources as valued as aphrodisiacs, and the industry as persisting into the mid-19th century. John Murrell's A Delightfull Daily Exercise for Ladies and Gentlewomen (1621) includes a method to sucket candy green lemons as a cordial for the stomach, and a recipe to sucket candy green ginger, green peaches, and apricots. Murrell suggested "succet of walnuts" for banqueting tables in English or Dutch fashion. A Closet for Ladies and Gentlewomen (1654) gives a recipe for walnut sucket. A manuscript recipe book owned by Constance Hall in 1672, held by the Folger Shakespeare Library, gives a recipe for making a cake, adding fruit and suckets just before baking.

=== Sucket fork ===
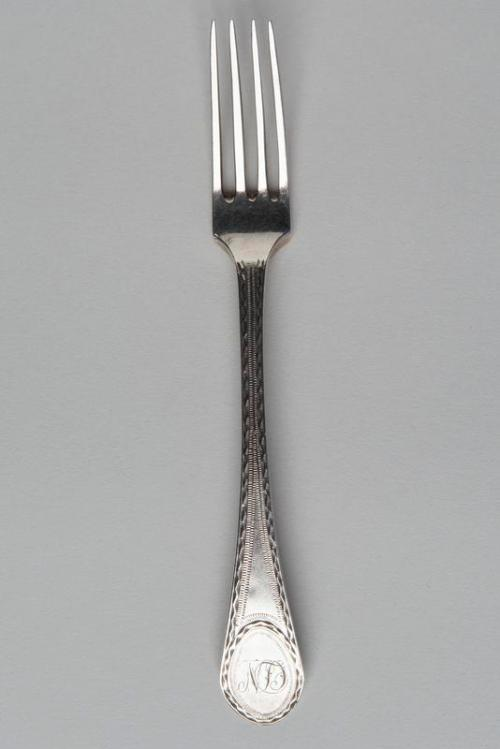
18th-century sucket fork made by James Wildgoose of Aberdeen.

As a dessert course, sucket was sometimes brought to the table in a silver sucket barrel and eaten with silver sucket forks. These seem to have been the earliest table forks used in England. Silver gilt sucket spoons and forks, and two conjoined sucket spoons and forks, appear in the inventory of Henry VIII. Some sucket spoons have forks at the other end to the bowl.

The combination of fork and spoon in one utensil is described by food writer Bee Wilson: with the fork end, sticky sweetmeats could be extracted from containers without dirtying the fingers, and with the other end, syrup could be spooned out. At times when confections became stuck in the teeth of diners, Wilson writes, the prongs were also convenient as toothpicks. Consumption of wet suckets was not restricted to the table, and were sometimes sipped from small dishes while walking.

As the term sucket became outmoded, the same confections continued to be made under names such as "conserve" and "preserve". Foods that would be understood as wet suckets continue to be sold in England, as jars of candied ginger that are imported from China.

== Historical references ==
At the funeral of Abbot John Islip at Westminster Abbey in 1532, a banquet was served in a room over his chapel consisting of "spyced breade, suckett, marmylate, spyced plate, and dyverss sorts of wynes plenty". Suckets were also served at the funeral of James Montague, Bishop of Winchester, in 1618.

In Scotland, James V took barrels of "succatis" with him on sea voyages in the 1530s.

Lady Yorke gave foodstuffs including four barrels of suckets to Mary I of England as a New Year's Day gift in 1557. The gift was delivered to the Queen's servant Edith Brediman. Lady Yorke also gave sucket to Elizabeth I in 1562. The gift was delivered to Kat Ashley.

The household accounts of Robert Dudley, 1st Earl of Leicester mention "green sucket". Mary, Queen of Scots ate sucket as a prisoner at Tutbury Castle in 1586. An account for her food, now held by the British Library, includes five ounces at sixpence the ounce. Sucket was also regarded and used as a medicine, Mary's apothecary held a stock of "confitures, succattes, preserves, conserves and other medicinable drugges".

The household accounts of Francis Willoughy at Wollaton and Old Hall in Nottinghamshire for July 1587 mention a pound of sucket purchased for half a crown (2 shillings and 6 pence), approximately the same cost per pound as marmalade. Sweets called "confectes" were also bought for the visit of the new Earl of Rutland. Marmalade and sucket were closely associated, and writers including Gabriel Harvey and Thomas Walkington drew upon the valued, sweet aspects to use the phrase "marmalade and sucket" in marking prose as being of great quality.

After the baptism of Prince Henry at Stirling Castle in August 1594, diplomats of the "States of Flanders", including Walraven III van Brederode, travelled to Newcastle, where the mayor Lionel Maddison treated them to a banquet including comfits, dried fruit, dried sucket, and Spanish sucket. A recipe book associated with Prince Henry (the binding has his heraldry) includes a list of nine "Dryed suckette of sevrall sorts".

During a break in his May 1616 trial, Robert Carr, Earl of Somerset snacked on suckets given to him by the Earl of Rutland. The Countess of Olivares sent a gift of foodstuffs in three carts to Prince Charles in 1625 including "sucketts and sweet meates".

Captain William Keeling of the East India Company gave a quantity of dry and wet suckets as a parting gift to the King or Sultan of Socotra in August 1615. John Smith wrote of his voyages and colonial activities using sugar and sucket as a metaphor for colonial activity. He had been "a reall Actor" on the hunt for "chests of Sugar" and "Boats of Sugar, Marmelade, Suckets".
