= Walraven III van Brederode =

Dutch aristocrat (1547-1614)

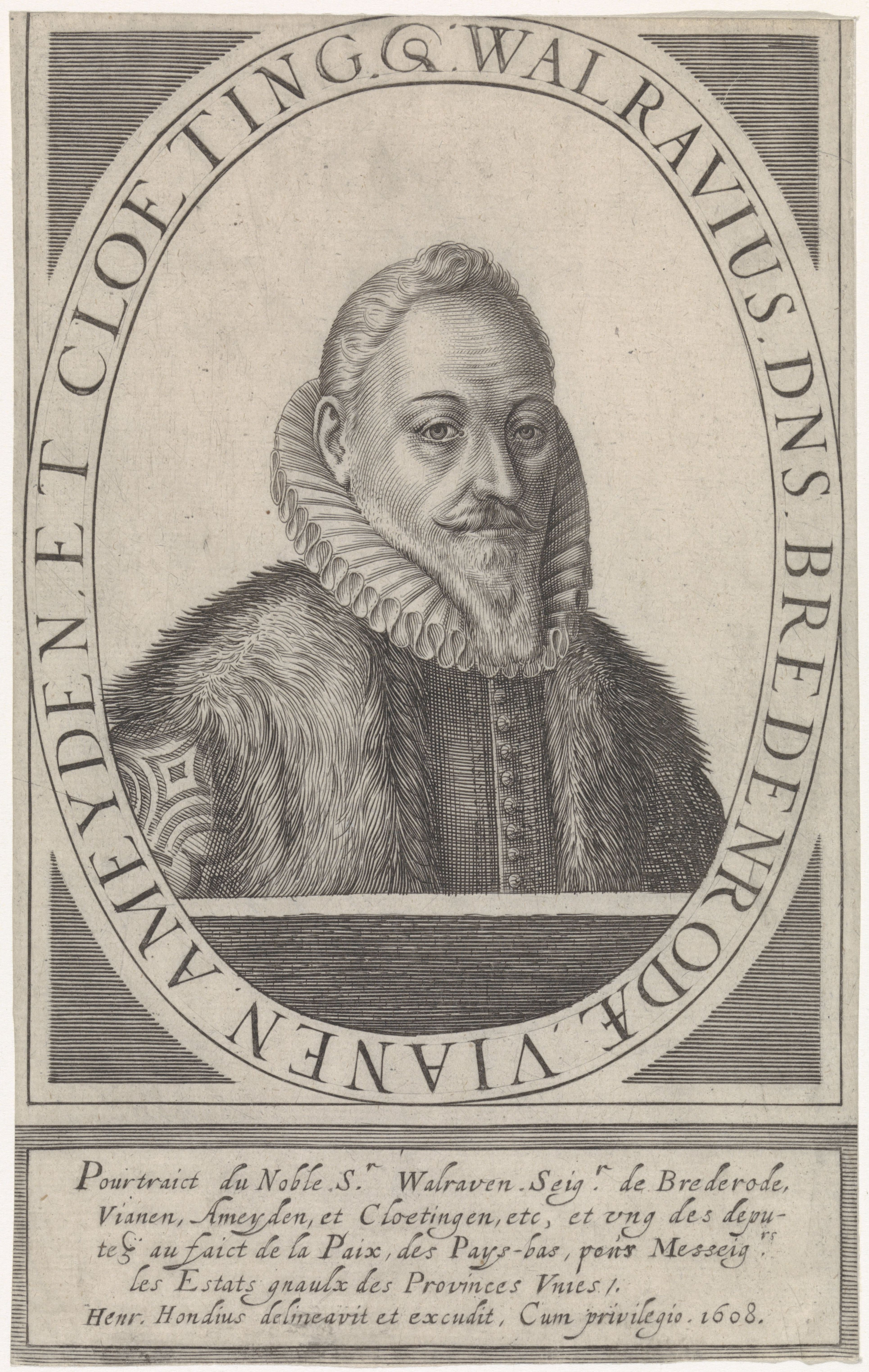
Print from 1608 by Hendrik Hondius

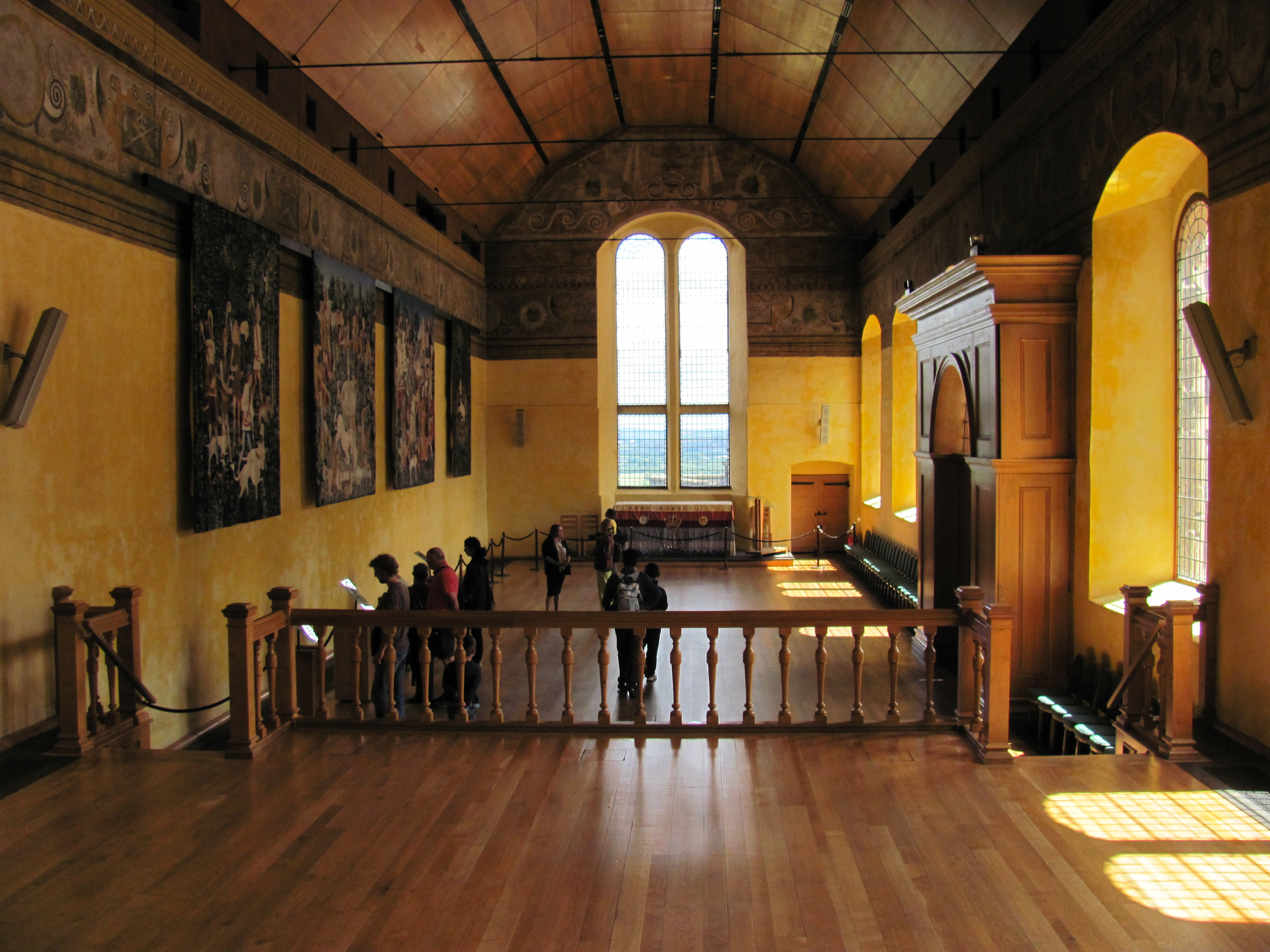
Brederode found inappropriate heraldry in the Chapel Royal at Stirling Castle

Walraven III van Brederode (1547–1614) was a Dutch aristocrat and diplomat. He was a son of Reinoud IV van Brederode and Margaretha van Doerne, and became Lord Van Brederode on the death of his father in 1584. He married Gulielma van Haeften.

== Scotland in 1594 ==
He was ambassador to Scotland from the Dutch Republic or United Provinces for the christening of Prince Henry in August 1594, accompanied by "Jacobus Falkius", Jacob Valcke, treasurer of Zeeland (died 1623). Brederode and Valcke wrote a lengthy report of their stay in Scotland. They arrived on 13 August at Newhaven and were greeted by the resident agent of the States General Adrian Damman and James Melville of Halhill. They stayed for two weeks in Leith and Edinburgh, meeting Alexander Seton, 1st Earl of Dunfermline, before travelling to Linlithgow and then to Stirling, where they were accommodated in Argyll's Lodging. They had audiences with James VI of Scotland on 3 September, and with Anne of Denmark, and saw the Prince. After dinner and some persuasion, King James danced in the Great Hall of Stirling Castle.

Brederode and Valck described a meeting with the other ambassadors at the castle to discuss the naming of the prince, which was traditional and customary for godfathers. According to their account, the name "Henry Frederick" was chosen to allude to the late Frederick II of Denmark and Henry Julius, Duke of Brunswick-Lüneburg and the late Henry, Duke of Mecklenburg, to Henry IV of France, and Henry VIII of England. Brederode and Valck were lodged in Stirling town and over the next few days came to the Palace for dinners hosted by the Earl of Mar and the other ambassadors. They also joined a hunt in the park.

During the celebrations at Stirling Castle they presented two large gold cups weighing 300 ounces and a letter in a gold box giving Prince Henry a yearly pension of 5,000 "Gelderlings" or "Gudlenes". He also brought a copy of the Scottish ratification of the Treaty of Binche which had been made on 1 May 1551, and he confirmed this league of friendship between Scotland and the Low Countries at Edinburgh on 13 September 1594. These documents were kept in a round box for many years. For a time the box was kept by William Keith of Delny, who was given the duty of collecting the pension. Delny left it in Edinburgh with John Gourlay, and in 1601 Gourlay delivered it to George Home of Spott. The lawyer Thomas Hamilton examined Brederode's commission in 1619 and noticed useful details regarding East Indian trade.

In the Chapel Royal at Stirling special seating and desks for the ambassadors had been decorated with coloured cloths and heraldry. Brederode and Valcke found their seat was decorated with the wrong coats of arms, and they asked for the arms of Holland and Zeeland to be taken down and replaced with the shields of the six United Provinces.

The arrival of the ambassadors in Scotland on 3 August and their entertainment at the baptism was noted by William Fowler in his A True Reportarie of the Baptisme of the Prince of Scotland (Robert Waldegrave, Edinburgh, 1594). In September 1594 James VI gave them gold chains with a medal with portraits of James VI and Anne of Denmark worth 1000 French crowns as a parting gift. They said goodbye to Anne of Denmark on the 25 September, and she recommended to them the soldier Alexander Murray, the uncle of one of her ladies-in-waiting in attendance, Anne Murray or Lilias Murray.

== England in 1594 and 1603 ==
Brederode and Valke travelled from Edinburgh first to Seton Palace, then to Newcastle upon Tyne where they were welcomed by the town officials and the mayor Lionel Maddison. They were treated to a banquet including baked rabbit, fish, and swan, a barrel of London beer, sucket, and sugar confectionaries, to the accompaniment of music by the town waits.

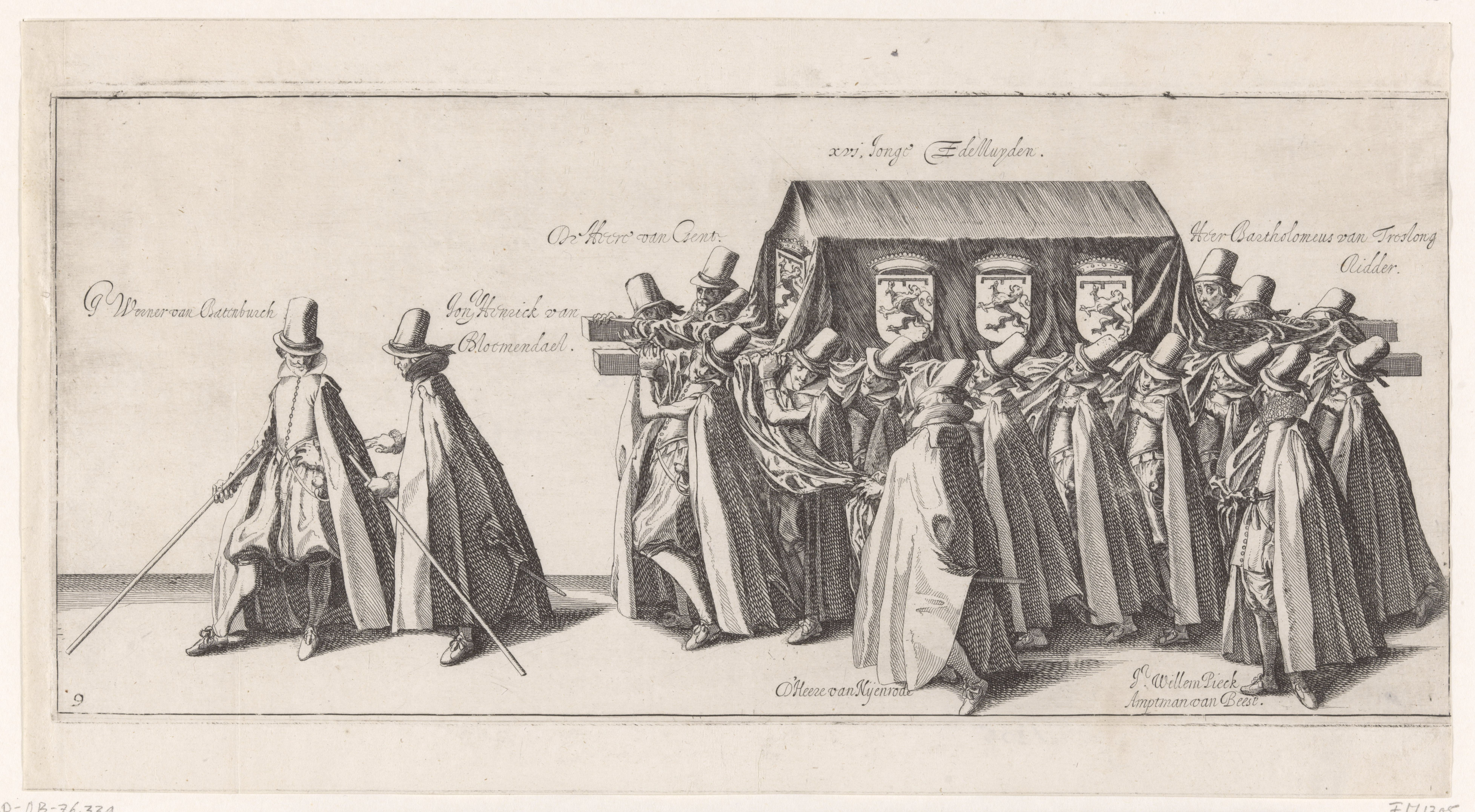
Funeral of Walraven III Brederode, by Simon Frisius

They travelled towards London and lodged at Bethnal Green, staying at the house of "Lord Schonewal", meaning the Lord Cromwell's mansion, originally built by John Colet. They had an audience with Elizabeth I at Nonsuch Palace. They made their report to the States General on 7 November 1594. They brought a portrait of Prince Henry, possibly the work of the court painter Adrian Vanson.

Bredrode was sent to England to congratulate King James on the Union of the Crowns in 1603. He died on 9 September 1614. Scenes of his funeral in January 1615 were engraved by Simon Frisius in a suite titled Begrafenis van Walraven van Brederode.

Robert Dudley, 1st Earl of Leicester had a portrait of "Mounsieur Brederodes" at Kenilworth Castle in 1583.
