= Elizabeth Wingfield =

Elizabeth Wingfield née Leche was an English courtier serving Elizabeth I as mother of the maids.

== Career ==
She was the daughter of Ralph Leche of Chatsworth and Elizabeth Hardwick née Leche or Leake. She was a half-sister of Bess of Hardwick.

Elizabeth Leche married Anthony Wingfield, a gentleman usher at Elizabeth's court. He had taken part in her coronation, dressed in antique costume to represent the Duke of Guyenne. Bess of Hardwick noted her as "my syster Wynfelde" in a list of courtiers.

Elizabeth Wingfield served as mother of maids at court between 1567 and 1598, when Elizabeth Jones took over the role. The mother of maids supervised young women who attended the royal court as maids of honour. Wingfield gave Queen Elizabeth in January 1598 a gift as mother of the maids, a "night rail of lawn wrought with black silk".

Elizabeth Wingfield wrote to Bess of Hardwick telling her that Queen Elizabeth thought well of her. Much of the surviving correspondence between the Wingfields and Bess of Hardwick concerns the purchase of suitable New Year's Day gifts for the Queen, including a cloak and safeguard of watchet blue or peach coloured satin. The Wingfields canvassed the opinions of other courtiers, including Lady Cobham, on what kind of gifts might best please the queen. Presents of fine craftmanship, especially costume, were now preferred rather than plate, jewels, or money. though Elizabeth Wingfield gave the queen a silver cup fashioned like a pomegranate in 1578.

In 1575, Bess gave costume on the advice of the Wingfields, and Elizabeth Wingfield wrote to Bess that the Queen was pleased with their choices:

her majesty neuer liked any thinge you gaue her so well, the color and strange triminge of the garments with the reche and grat cost bestowed vpon that hath caused her to geve out such good speches of my lord and your ladyship as I never heard of better

her majesty never liked any thing you gave her so well, the colour and strange trimming of the garments with the rich and great cost bestowed upon that hath caused her to give out such good speeches of my Lord and your Ladyship as I never heard of better

The letter indicates that Elizabeth Wingfield coordinated the purchase, instructing embroiderers and the tailor Walter Fyshe.

After the death of Anthony Wingfield in 1593, she married George Pollard of Langley, an usher daily waiter who served with Richard Coningsby as Black Rod under King James. Pollard died in 1617, the date of Elizabeth's death is unknown.
