= Edith Brediman =

English courtier

Edith Brediman (died 1590), was an English courtier. She served as chamberer of queen Mary I of England.

She was born Edith Brocas or Brokwesse. In 1556, she married George Brediman.

Mary I gave "Edeth Brydeman" a New Year's Day gift of a gilt salt in 1557, a more valuable gift than that received by George Brediman. The gift rolls record that "Edeth Brydeman" took delivery of a gift of sweetmeats, figs, sugar loaves, sucket and orange water for Mary, and she may have been in charge of such foodstuffs and medicinal materials in the queen's chamber.

Edith was rewarded for attending Mary during her final illness on 28 October 1558. The warrant mentions Edith's "watching and other pains taking in time of our sickness". She signed her name in a Book of Hours which had once belonged to Henry VII, writing under an illustration for the Office of the Dead:

In all tyme of neccessitye: with your prayer remember me
Edeth Bredyman.

Edith Brediman signed "Edeth B" for the gift of a russet velvet kirtle from Elizabeth I in May 1562. Edith's friends included Frances Jerningham, who bequeathed her a ring as a token of affection.
