= Anthony Wingfield (d. 1593) =

16th-century English courtier

Gentleman Usher of the Black Rod
- In office 1591–1593
- Monarch: Elizabeth I
- Preceded by: John Norreys; Sir William Norreys (joint)
- Succeeded by: Simon Bowyer

Personal details
- Born: c. 1506
- Died: 1593
- Spouses: Katherine née Blennerhassett (d. 1554) Jane (d. 1562): Elizabeth
- Parents: Sir Anthony Wingfield; Elizabeth née Vere

Anthony Wingfield of Sibston (1506–1593) was an English courtier, a gentleman usher and Black Rod from 1591 until his death. He was one of the fifteen children of Sir Anthony Wingfield and his wife Elizabeth, née Vere.

== Career and family ==
Anthony married firstly Katherine (died 1558), daughter of Sir Thomas Blennerhassett of Frenze, Norfolk, and widow of John Gosnold (d.1554) of Shrubland Park in Barham, Suffolk;

He married secondly Jane (died 1562), daughter of Edmund Purpett of the manor of Waldingfield;

He married thirdly Elizabeth Wingfield nee Leche, a daughter of Ralph Leeche of Chatsworth, Derbyshire, and a half-sister of Bess of Hardwick. Wingfield wrote to his wife about the purchase of suitable New Year's Day gifts for Elizabeth I, including a cloak and safeguard of watchet blue satin.

Ushers took charge of arrangements for the lodgings of the Queen when she went on progress. When William More was reluctant to host the Queen at his newly rebuilt Loseley Park he asked Wingfield to prevent the visit. Wingfield enlisted courtiers to speak to Elizabeth about the unsatisfactory small rooms at Loseley, but the visit went ahead.

Wingfield made preparations for a tournament of running at the tilt in November 1589. He was Black Rod from 1591 until his death in 1593.

== References and further reading ==
- Wingfield, Edward Mervyn: “Muniments of the Ancient Saxon Family of Wingfield”, London 1894.
- Archdale, Henry Blackwood: Memoirs of the Archdales, Enniskillen, 1925, p. 11-12
- Barry, T. Life and Family History of William Honnyng, London, 2008, page 93
