= Simon Basil =

English surveyor

Simon Basil (fl. 1590 — 1615) was an English surveyor or architect, who held the post of Surveyor of the King's Works, 1606-15.

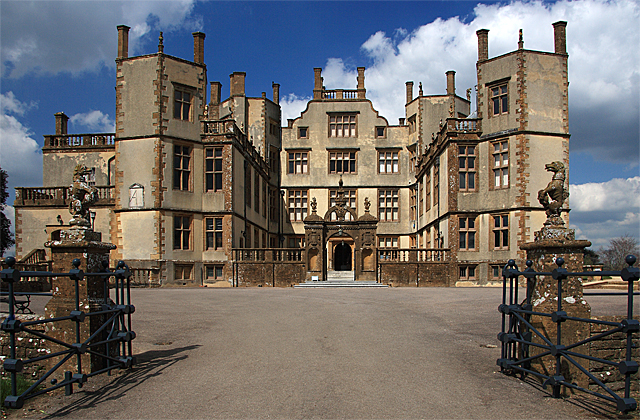
Sherborne New Castle, with its unusual hexagonal towers

== Works ==
Simon Basil's first recorded appearance, in 1590, was drawing a plan of Ostend, a military objective at the time, for the previous Surveyor, Robert Adams. Similarly in 1597 he is mentioned in respect of a "modell" of Flushing. In that year he was Comptroller of the Royal Works.

His major patron was Robert Cecil, 1st Earl of Salisbury, in his London residence, 'Salisbury' or 'Cecil House' in the Strand, London (1600-1602), and at Cecil's main seat, Hatfield House, Hertfordshire (1607–12). Some of his plans and elevations for Salisbury House survive. It is unclear to what extent he was involved in design at Hatfield, where he served as clerk of the works.

Basil sent a letter regarding his progress on Cecil House to Cecil on 14 August 1601. He explained that it was too late in the building season to complete the court with symmetry, but he could remedy the defect by painting the new plaster in imitation of brickwork. The new front would be completed with brickwork and Oxford stone ornaments. He doubted the front could be finished before October. In another letter to Robert Cecil written in September 1601, Basil mentioned that he was using windows salvaged from 'clerestories' in Kent in one of his patron's houses, and installing a stove.

Basil and the sergeant painter John de Critz were jointly given the ward of Philip Saltmarsh to boost their income. They sold their rights to a third party, Francis Needham.

In July 1605 he built a house, "hovel" or "shed" for a lioness in the new court of the Tower of London, she had twin cubs on the same day he finished work. On 4 April 1606, the Scottish architect David Cunningham of Robertland resigned the Surveyorship to Basil. Basil was responsible for a new palace at Royston, its design having some similarities with Cecil's Hatfield.

Basil worked on the New Exchange (1608–09), where Basil's design was preferred to one drawn up by Inigo Jones. In 1609 Basil and William Goodrowse made improvements in the garden at Somerset House for Anne of Denmark. In June 1609 Basil went to Woking Palace to estimate costs for repairs to the manor, office houses, and two bridges. The keeper Edward Zouch asked Basil to estimate for cleaning out the moat and building a new bridge over the river at the front of the house, which would increase the privacy of the king's garden.

Basil's drawing of the lodge for Sir Walter Raleigh that has been expanded as Sherborne Castle, Dorset, (c.1600-1609) shows by dashed lines that the unusual angle of the corner towers is centred in the opposite corner.

After Basil's death, Inigo Jones was appointed Surveyor of the King's Works.

== Family ==
Simon Basil's own background is obscure. He married Elizabeth Rainsford in 1605. Their son, also Simon, became a Clerk in the Royal Works and died in 1663. A daughter, Elizabeth, was baptised at St Martin-in-the-Fields in February 1610. Simon Basil died in September 1615 and was buried at St Martins-in-the-Fields.
