= Clement Adams =

English schoolmaster and author

Clement Adams (c. 1519 – c. 1587) was an English schoolmaster and writer, noted for producing an engraving of Sebastian Cabot's map of the world, sometime after 1544.

== Biography ==
Adams was born at Buckington, Warwickshire, about 1519. He was educated at Eton, and thereafter elected to King's College, Cambridge, 17 August 1536, of which he is supposed to have been elected fellow in 1539. He took the degree of BA in 1540–1, and of M.A. in 1544, and was appointed schoolmaster to the "young courtly companions of Edward VI" at Greenwich 3 May 1552, at a salary of £10 per annum. He died 9 Jan 1586–7, and was buried at St. Alphege, Greenwich. His son, Robert Adams, was also a mapmaker and surveyor of the Queen's works.

The earliest mention of Adams in the printed literature of the sixteenth century is by his contemporary, Richard Eden, the father of English geography. From the pages of his little read and less known Decades we learn that Clement Adams was a schoolmaster and not a traveller. To Adams we owe the first written account of the earliest English intercourse with Russia. Eden writes: "Wheras I have before (p. 252) made mention howe Moscouia was in our tyme discoured by the direction and information of the sayde master Sebastian [Cabote] who longe before had this secreate in his minde, I shall not neede here to describe that viage, forasmuch as the same is largely and faithfully written in the Latyn tonge by that lerned young man, Clement Adams, scol mayster to the Queenes henshemen (i.e. pages of honour) as he received it at the mouth of the sayde Richard Chancelor."

The incidental allusion to the old pilot major Sebastian Cabot has some significance in connection with Adams. Cabot, it is well known, made a famous Mappe-monde, recording, among other things, the discoveries of himself and his father, John Cabot, along the coast of 'Newfoundland' (either Nova Scotia or Newfoundland) in 1497, the date of which discovery has been the subject of much debate among geographers and antiquaries. A contemporary copy of Cabot's map, discovered in Germany, is preserved in the Bibliothèque nationale de France, the original of which is now lost, in a volume edited by Nathan Chytræus, first published in 1594. It would appear that there was also a copy preserved at Oxford at the period named; be this as it may, we learn from Hakluyt, in 1584, that yet another copy was made and 'cut' by Adams, which was evidently well known at the period, for we read in a manuscript by Hakluyt on Westerne Planting (discovered in 1854) of 'the copye of [Gabote's] map sett out by Mr. Clemente Adams, and is in many marchants houses in London.' Hakluyt, five years later, amplifies this statement as to the map by Adams, in quoting a legend relating to the discoveries of the Cabots to be found upon it, described by him as 'an extract taken out of the mappe of Sebastian Cabot, cut by Clement Adams, concerning his [Cabot's] discovery of the West Indias which is to be seene in her Maiesties privie gallerie at Westminster, and in many other ancient merchants houses.' No copy of this map engraved by Adams is now known to exist.

The only basis for the assumption that he was a traveller is the association of his name with that of Richard Chancellor. That he did not accompany Chancellor in his first voyage to Russia in 1553 is certain, for the name of every person above the rank of an ordinary seaman that accompanied both Sir Hugh Willoughby and Chancellor in the voyage is preserved to us in the pages of Hakluyt (cf. edition of 1589, p. 266). The name of the only clerkly person among the two crews was that of John Stafford, 'minister' on board the 'Edward Bonaventure,' commanded by Chancellor.

The work referred to by Eden was committed to writing by Adams upon Chancellor's return from his first voyage to Russia in 1554. The title runs thus: ‘Nova Anglorum ad Moscovitas navigatio Hugone Willowbeio equite classis præfecto, et Richardo Cancelero nauarcho. Authore Clemente Adamo, Anglo.’ It was first printed by Hakluyt in his Collections of 1589. This is followed by a translation headed thus: ‘The newe Nauigation and discouerie of the kingdome of Moscouia, by the North east, in the yeere 1553; Enterprised by Sir Hugh Willoughbie, knight, and perfourmed by Richard Chanceler, Pilot maior of the voyage. Translated out of the former Latine into English,’ probably by Hakluyt himself. In the two subsequent editions of Hakluyt the Latin text by Adams is omitted.
