= Hugh Kayle =

English goldsmith

Hugh Kayle or Keale or Keall (died by 1598) was a London goldsmith who served Elizabeth I from 1577.

He was a son of John Keale, also a goldsmith. Hugh Kayle was a churchwarden of St Mary Woolnoth in 1574 and 1575.

Kayle marked silverware supplied to the queen with a special punch. In 1578 he made a silver basin for the queen's privy chamber. In 1581, amongst other plate, he made two silver setting sticks for the queen, weighing together 4.25 ounces. These were used to set or shape the queen's ruffs. The sticks went missing in 1595 and a lady of the bedchamber, Margaret Astley (the second wife of John Astley), was held responsible.

He worked in partnership with Alderman Richard Martin from 1590. In 1591 they supplied plate given by the queen at several christenings. In October 1594 Kayle and Martin were paid £2635 for their work over a year. This included the costs of plate given to ambassadors or as New Year's day gifts, mending the queen's plate, for paying craftsman working on the queen's coffers, and expenses made by officers of the Goldsmiths' Company looking for stolen plate. Kayle and Martin received £2236 in May 1597, and £2377 in 1599.

In October 1600, Hugh Kayle, Leonard Bushe, and the German-born John Spilman appraised and sold a quantity of old jewels, precious stones, and other stones, from the Tower of London on the orders of Queen Elizabeth. These included pearls that had been embroidered on the Queen's gowns, and "diverse Dutch agates and counterfeit stones".

His children included John, Hugh, Lancelot, Anne, and Rowland.

The historian Arthur J. Collins notes that Kayle was sometimes required to pay back some of the costs he charged Elizabeth for gold and silver plate which was found to be under weight. Collins notes that Kayle's widow made such a payment in 1598 and so later references may be to his son.
