= Robert Adams (architect) =

English architect (1540–1595)

Robert Adams (1540–1595) was a 16th-century English architect, engraver and surveyor of buildings to Queen Elizabeth. He was a son of Clement Adams.

He was a son of Clement Adams, a schoolmaster and map maker. He wrote about the voyages of Richard Chancellor. As a New Year's Day gift to Elizabeth in 1561, Clement Adams presented a pattern for the embroidery of a pair of sleeves.

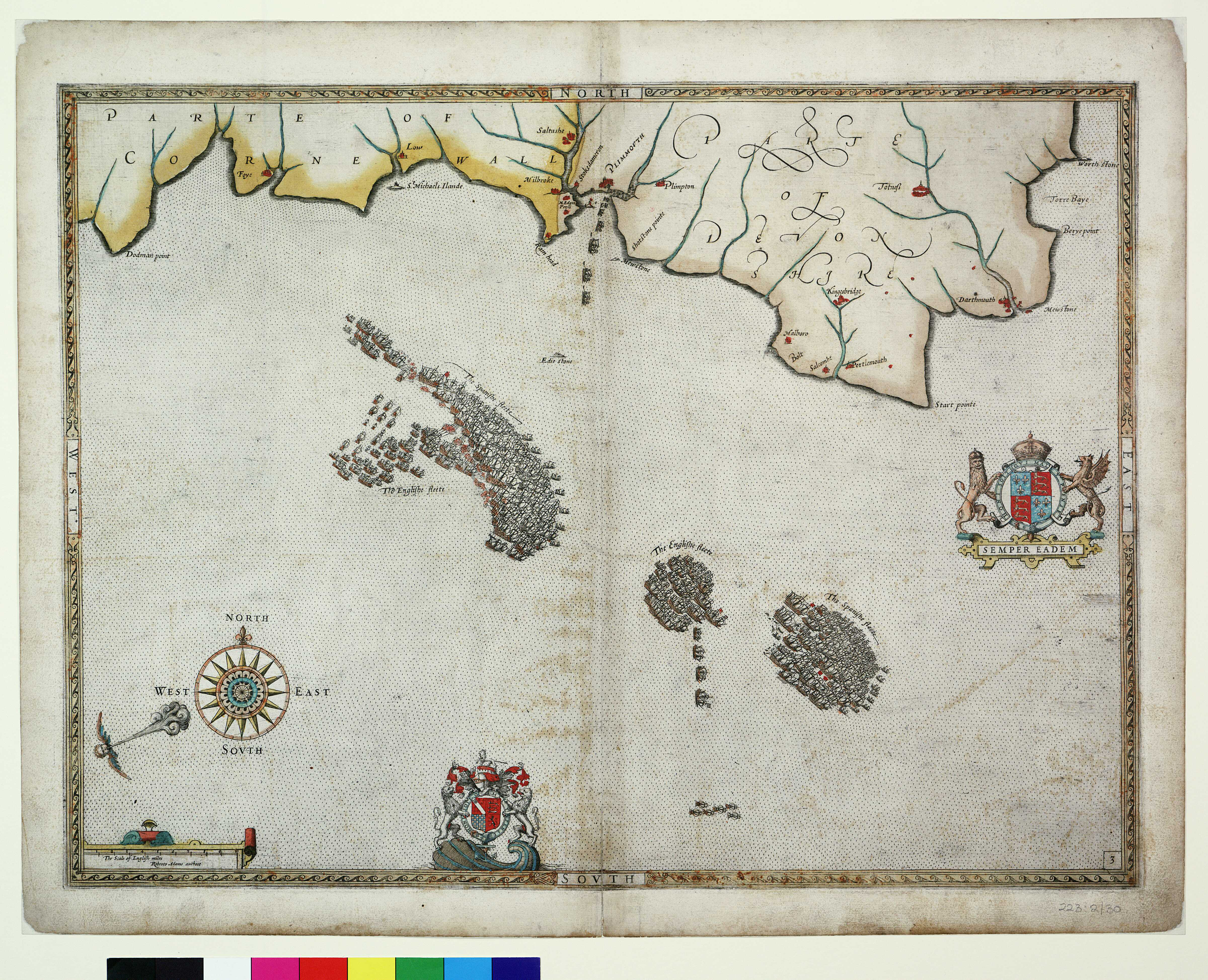
The English engage the Spanish fleet near Plymouth on 31 July 1588, one of Adams's maps commissioned in 1590 by Howard of Effingham, prepared for use by Hendrick Cornelisz Vroom for the Armada Tapestries

None of Robert Adams's architectural works are known to have survived, but some of his plans and engravings are still extant, such as a large 1588 plan of Middleburgh and, from the same year, a small parchment roll, drawn with pen, entitled "Thamesis Descriptio", which shows lines drawn across the River Thames and the various ranges of guns at different points from Tilbury Fort to London. Adams also drew and engraved representations of the Spanish Armada's activities on the British coasts, which were published by Augustine Ryther in 1589.

Robert Adams died in his 55th year and was buried in the church at Greenwich, where the following inscription was placed to his memory:

"Egregio viro Roberto Adams, operum regiarum supervisori, architecturae peritissimo. Ob. 1595. Simon Basil, operationum regiarum contrarotulator, hoc posuit monumentum 1601."

To the distinguished Robert Adams, supervisor of the royal works, most skilled at architecture. Died 1595. Simon Basil, his successor at the royal works, put up this monument here 1601.
