= John Chamberlain (letter writer) =

English writer

John Chamberlain (1553–1628) was the author of a series of letters written in England from 1597 to 1626, notable for their historical value and their literary qualities. In the view of historian Wallace Notestein, Chamberlain's letters "constitute the first considerable body of letters in English history and literature that the modern reader can easily follow". They are an essential source for scholars who study the period.

== Life ==
Chamberlain's father Richard was a successful ironmonger, also Sheriff of London and twice Master of the Worshipful Company of Ironmongers, who left his son enough money to live on for the rest of his life without needing to earn a living. His mother, Anne, was the daughter of Robert Downe, an ironmonger and alderman. Though unambitious for himself, Chamberlain used his network of friends in high places to assist the career of Dudley Carleton, who rose from a minor position in the diplomatic service to become Secretary of State shortly after Chamberlain's death. Carleton preserved the long correspondence between himself and Chamberlain, which contains the majority of Chamberlain's surviving letters. Chamberlain maintained a similar correspondence with Sir Ralph Winwood, for many years ambassador at The Hague, and he presumably sent many other letters to his friends.

Chamberlain wrote at least one long letter a week. His purpose was more than social; it was to provide his friends, posted abroad in foreign embassies and out of touch with the London scene, with useful and reliable information about the events and issues of the day. Chamberlain would walk daily to St Paul's Cathedral to gather the latest news on the London grapevine and then report it to his correspondents as accurately and objectively as possible, including public and private opinion on the value of the information. Chamberlain is a particularly valuable source for contemporary opinion on King James I, for information about the royal family and the court, and for details of English trading activities in the earliest days of empire.

Chamberlain is valued not just as a commentator but as a writer. Historian A. L. Rowse has called him "the best letter writer of his time". Chamberlain takes care to observe without intruding his own opinions; though his disapproval of the laxity of the day is apparent, he does not waste words on moral indignation. He entertains his correspondents by leavening factual information with humour and vivid details, and includes lighter topics and anecdotes to keep the reader's interest. In the view of scholar Maurice Lee, Jr., the letters that passed between John Chamberlain and Dudley Carleton are "the most interesting private correspondence of Jacobean England".

== Character ==
Chamberlain's letters provide a portrait of a typical London gentleman of late Elizabethan and Jacobean times, moderate in politics and religion. Chamberlain emerges from his letters as a kind man and a considerate friend, who preferred a peaceful life and commented on the contemporary world as an onlooker. Though he willingly sought career openings for his friends, he was uninterested in office or financial gain for himself and lived the life of a quiet, even timid bachelor. As he once wrote: "I am past all ambition, and wish nor seek nothing but how to live suaviter and in plenty". This detached approach lends an objective quality to Chamberlain's letters. As a conscientious correspondent, he took pains to get his facts right. He saw through pretence and delusions but was never cynical or indignant. His generosity as a man is reflected in the fairness of outlook that pervades his letters. Just as his friends confided and trusted in him, often with important secrets, historians have trusted his information and insights into the Jacobean scene. Historian Alan Stewart calls Chamberlain, "a notable barometer of public opinion".

Chamberlain certainly had personal shortcomings, of which he was fully aware, but they are not such as to affect the quality of his letters. He was naturally inquisitive and a gossip, qualities that served as an asset to him as a letter writer. He had been a sickly and delicate child; and although he attended both Cambridge University and the Inns of Court, he never took his degree or qualified as a lawyer. Wallace Notestein, who included a long essay on Chamberlain in his Four Worthies (1956), described him as "wanting in initiative". He always lived in the households of friends and relatives; on the one occasion he attempted to run his own establishment, it proved too much for him. He was also timid in love; and though hints that he considered marriage creep into his letters now and then, nothing came of these opportunities. Editor Norman McClure suggests that Chamberlain may at one time have considered marrying Dudley Carleton's sister Alice. In his will, among many generous gifts to his friends, he made a sizeable bequest to Alice, explaining: "This I do, in regard of the sincere goodwill and honest affection I bear her, and of the true and long-continued friendship between us, and for a testimony of that further good I had intended her, if God had given me means".

== Friends ==
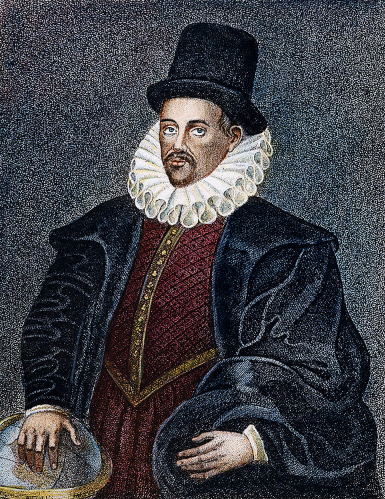
William Gilbert, natural philosopher, in whose house Chamberlain lodged

Chamberlain acquired an interesting group of friends, mainly drawn from the middle ranks of society, with a background either in business or in the lesser country gentry. These included Ralph Winwood and Dudley Carleton, who both rose to become secretaries of state, the latter after Chamberlain's death. Such men saw themselves as members of a professional civil-servant class rather than as courtiers. Winwood, like Carleton, began as a diplomat, and Chamberlain's letters regularly report on his chances of becoming secretary of state, to which office Winwood was finally appointed in March 1614. Chamberlain remained close friends with Winwood during his secretaryship and often stayed at Winwood's country seat, Ditton Park: the information he retails in his letters clearly owes much to this friendship.

Other notable friends of Chamberlain were Henry Wotton, himself an important letter writer; Thomas Bodley, who founded the Bodleian Library in Oxford; the bishop and scholar Lancelot Andrewes; and the historian William Camden. Chamberlain was constantly in demand as a house guest. In the summer, he would leave London, "this misty and unsavoury town", and embark on what he called his merry "progresses", staying at various country houses, for example with the Fanshawes at Ware, the Wallops at Farleigh, or the Lyttons at Knebworth. For a time, Chamberlain lodged in the household of the natural philosopher and physician William Gilbert, whom he may have met at Cambridge University.

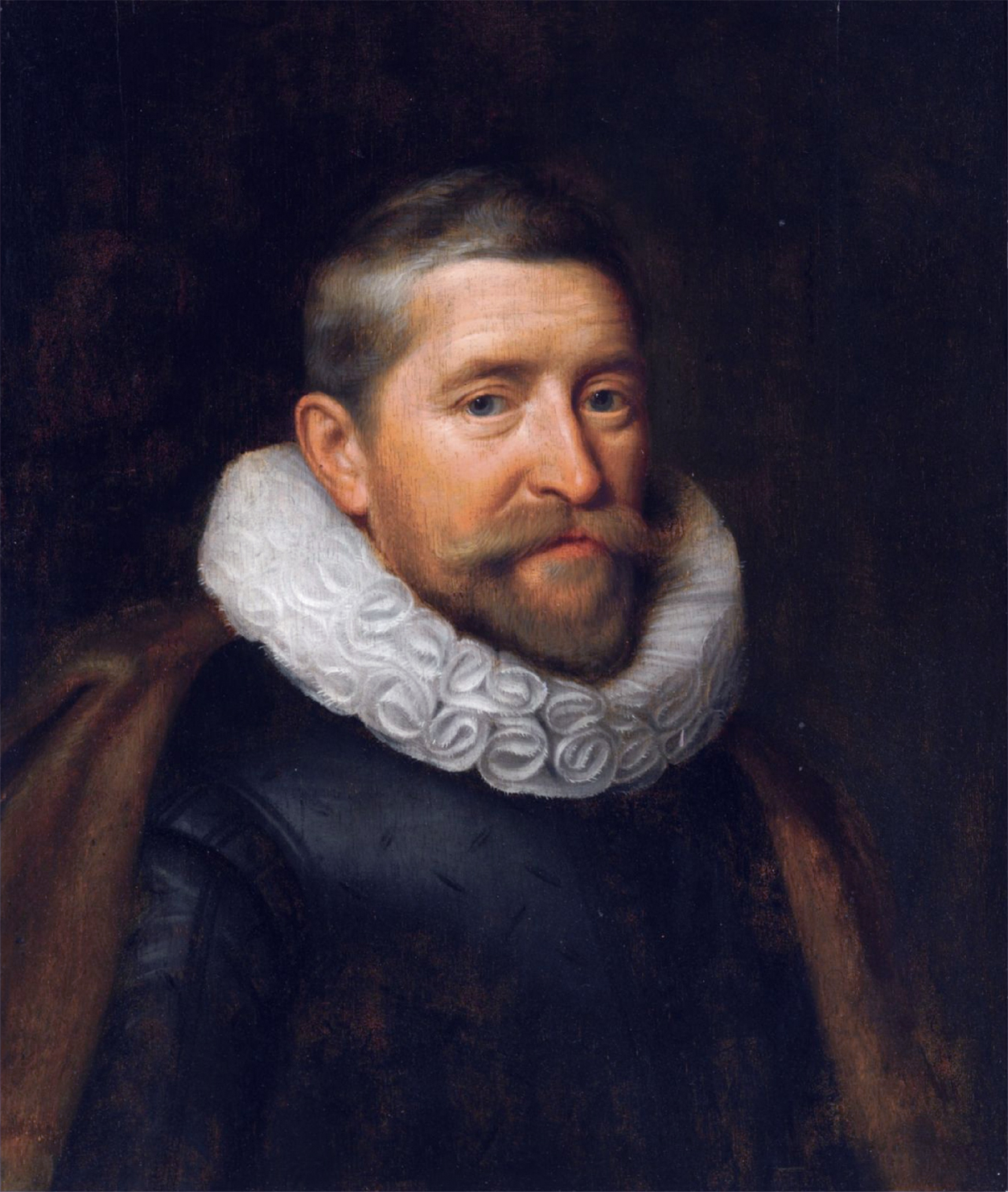
Sir Henry Wotton by Michiel van Mierevelt

Such a combination of friends and contacts enabled Chamberlain to report the main events of the day and to catch the mood of the hour. Drawing on these personal sources of information, as well as his contacts at St Paul's, Chamberlain provided his correspondents with information about key figures in England, including Walter Raleigh; the chancellor Robert Cecil; the chancellor and philosopher Francis Bacon; the king's favourite Robert Carr, and his notorious wife Frances. Chamberlain knew many people, and those he did not know, friends and contacts could tell him about. Chamberlain's letters shed light on the main events affecting the country during his adult life: the rebellion of Robert Devereux, 2nd Earl of Essex; the accession of King James; the Gunpowder Plot; the Thomas Overbury case; the rise of King James's final favourite George Villiers; and the Spanish Match. Chamberlain also wrote about some of the leading artists and writers of the day, including the poet and clergyman John Donne, the architect and designer of masques Inigo Jones, and the playwright and poet Ben Jonson. If he knew William Shakespeare, however, he never mentioned him—he does not appear to have been a theatregoer. In 1614, he wrote of the new Globe Theatre: "I hear much speech of this new playhouse, which is said to be the fairest that ever was in England, so that if I live but seven years longer I may chance make a journey to see it".

== Dudley Carleton ==
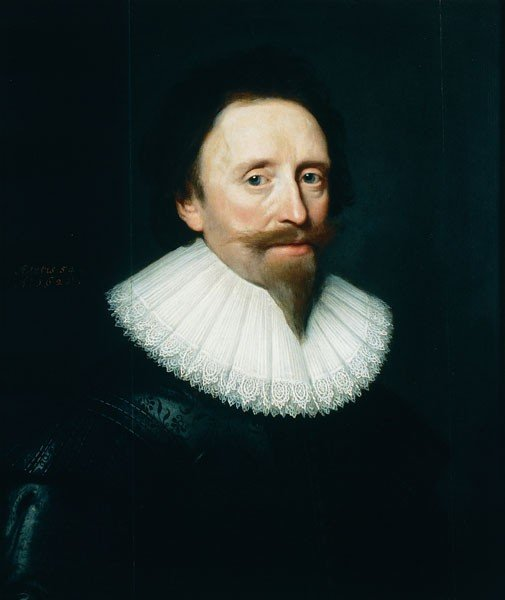
Sir Dudley Carleton, by Michiel van Mierevelt, 1628

Chamberlain's major correspondent was Dudley Carleton, whose mother's sister was the wife of Chamberlain's nephew Thomas Stukely. When the correspondence began in the mid-1570s, Carleton was a young man, about twenty years younger than Chamberlain, urgently seeking a career. Chamberlain, through his friendship with Winwood, helped Carleton secure his first job, in the English embassy in Paris. By the time of Chamberlain's death, the upwardly mobile Carleton was a highly placed diplomat, on the brink of becoming secretary of state. However, he himself had only four years to live. Scholars have Carleton, who was "a magpie about his papers", to thank for the legacy of his vast correspondence, which provides a key resource for the period. On occasion, he confided diplomatic secrets to Chamberlain, safe in the knowledge of his friend's discretion.

Chamberlain not only wrote letters to Carleton but sometimes performed errands on his behalf that brought him into contact with important political figures. Immediately after the Gunpowder Plot of 1605, Carleton, who had been a secretary to Henry Percy, one of the plotters, was briefly confined and found himself unemployable. Chamberlain worked hard to bring Carleton back into favour, for example calling upon Sir Walter Cope, a friend of Cecil's whom Chamberlain dubbed "the idle oracle of the Strand". Carleton finally found work abroad. Other errands performed by Chamberlain on his behalf included paying his bills, taking gifts to ladies, and passing messages to his political contacts. Carleton often sought Chamberlain's advice about both political and personal matters: Carleton's usual prescription was patience. "To tell you truly," he once admitted, "methinks we are like physicians that consult of a patient without feeling any part of his pain, and finding the disease somewhat difficult, apply no other remedy but good words and good wishes, and make him believe that time and good diet will cure it alone". Carleton always appreciated Chamberlain's friendship and support. Though Carleton's letters are not generally considered the equal of Chamberlain's in quality, his editor, Maurice Lee Jr., calls them "every bit as clear and polished".

== News gatherer ==
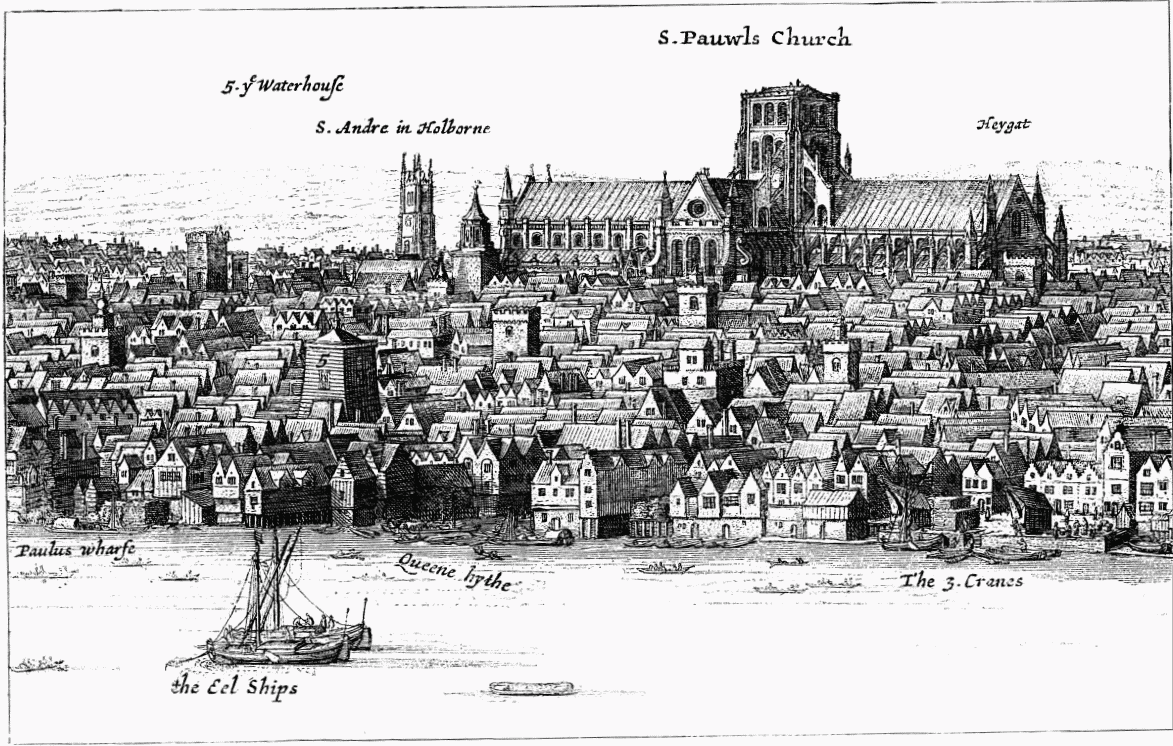
View of London with Old St. Paul's Cathedral, where Chamberlain gathered his news. The great length of the nave earned it the name "Paul's walk".

Chamberlain was particularly useful to Carleton as a source of London news. Chamberlain's main purpose in his letters was to relate news of events in the capital to his correspondents, who were often abroad. Sir Dudley Carleton, for example, spent most of his political career at Venice or the Hague. Chamberlain proved the perfect source for Carleton and others because of his passion for news.

Every day he walked to St Paul's Cathedral to hear the latest on the grapevine, from the "news-mongers", as they were called. At that time, the aisles and nave of the cathedral, known as Paul's walk, were a meeting place for those wishing to keep in touch with current events, and Chamberlain proved adept at pumping people there for news of politics, war, court matters and trials. As well as those who walked St Paul's for news, the cathedral and its surrounds bristled with beggars, hawkers, and sellers of pamphlets, proclamations and books Despite their serious purpose, Chamberlain lightened his letters with news of more trivial and entertaining events, such as a long-distance race from St Albans to Clerkenwell between two royal footmen and the antics of a man and his horse on the roof of St Paul's.

== King James and the court ==
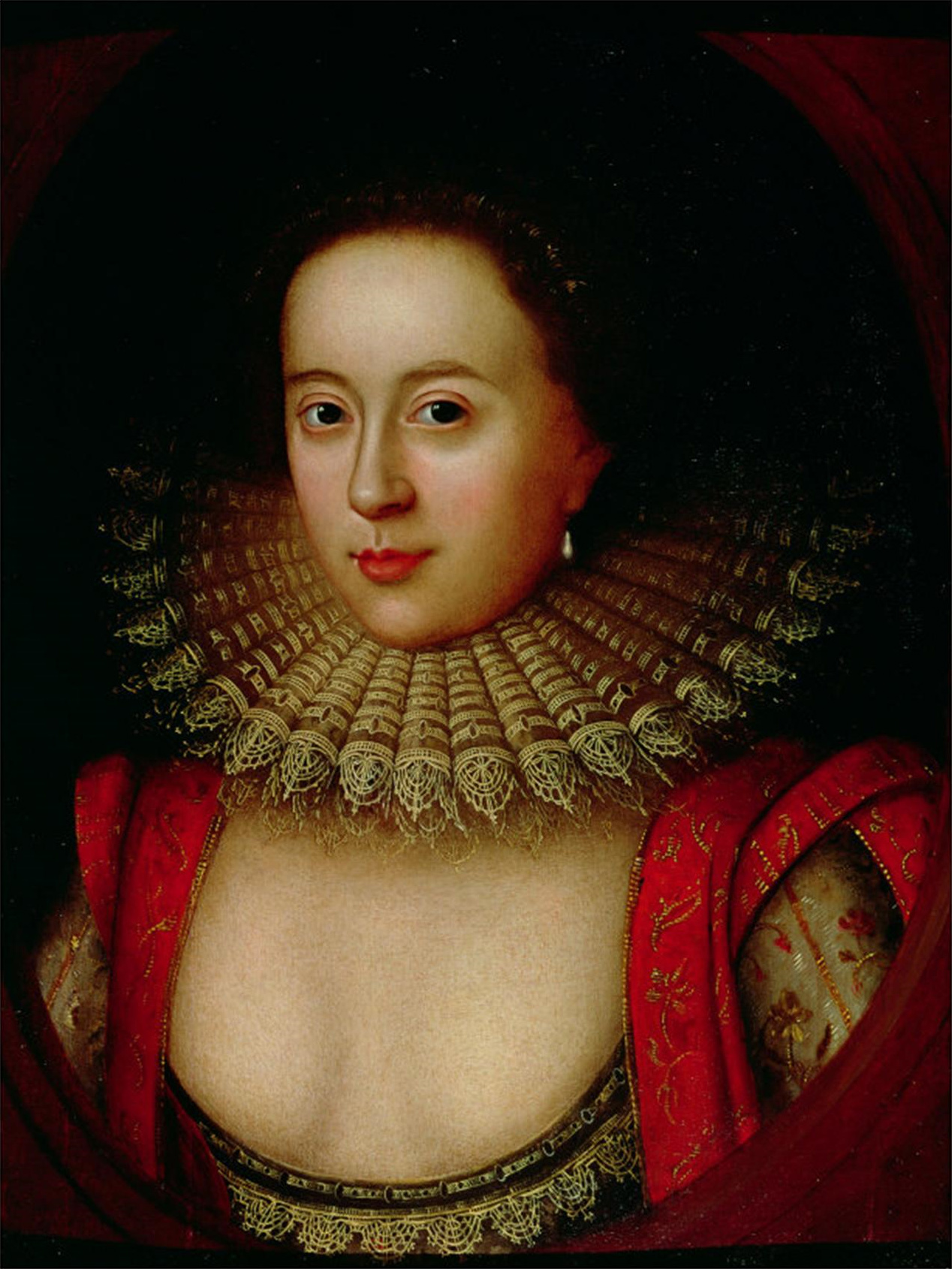
Frances Howard, Countess of Essex, by William Larkin

Though Chamberlain circulated among members of the upper gentry, he was never close to court circles, nor did he wish to be. In Notestein's words, "The reader of Chamberlain gains little respect for the Court of James I". Chamberlain's letters give well-informed reports on the greatest scandal of James's reign, the divorce and later conviction for murder of Frances Howard, Countess of Essex. Even before the countess's divorce from the Earl of Essex to marry Robert Carr, Viscount Rochester, the king's favourite, Chamberlain reported that the countess had approached a "wise woman" to help her do away with her husband. On 14 October 1613, he noted both the divorce of the Essexes and the death of Robert Carr's friend Thomas Overbury in the Tower of London: "The foulness of his corpse gave suspicion and leaves aspersion that he should die of the pox or somewhat worse". Frances Howard married Robert Carr shortly after her divorce, with the king's blessing, the pair becoming the Duke and Duchess of Somerset. It emerged in 1615, however, that Overbury had been poisoned, and in 1616 the couple were found guilty of conspiring in his murder and locked in the Tower. Historians often quote Chamberlain's letters as a source for these events. His tone is one of shame and disgust at the court, but he reports the facts objectively, without gloating at the demise of the Somersets.

In an age when spies were everywhere and letters insecure in transit, Chamberlain was discreet in his comments about King James, the Scottish king who inherited the throne from Elizabeth I of England in 1603. However, it becomes clear from his letters that Chamberlain was not impressed by James. "He forgets not business," he wrote, "but he hath found the art of frustrating men's expectations and holding them in suspense". Chamberlain affords us more glimpses of James's character than any other contemporary source; his letters provide an insight into how people of his class viewed the monarch and the court.

Despite Chamberlain's disapproval of James, nowhere does he report the clumsy and gross figure depicted later in the seventeenth century by anti-Stuart historians, such as Anthony Weldon; nor does he ever imply that James's love for his male favourites was homosexual, though this may have been through prudence. Rather, he reports James's egoism, imperiousness, and lack of judgement. He tells us, for example, that during a sermon by the Bishop of London, James began interrupting so loudly that the Bishop could not continue; and when courtiers told James it was not the fashion to have a play on Christmas night, he retorted: "I will make it a fashion". Chamberlain also noted the officiousness of James, who liked to take a personal interest in scandals and court cases and was forever throwing people in the tower for speaking out of order. "I should rather wish him, " wrote Chamberlain, "to contemn these barking whelps and all their bawlings than to trouble himself with them, and bring these things to scanning, for it breeds but more speech, and to see silly men so severely censured begets commiseration". Chamberlain also provides valuable details of the king's habits. He reports, for example, that even when ill, James maintained his interest in country sports: "He is so desirous to see certain hawks fly, that he would not be stayed"; if he could not hunt, he would have his deer "brought to make a muster before him".

Chamberlain regarded James as extravagant, and a poor judge of men. In particular, he frowns at James's tendency to give away royal bounty and crown lands to his favourites when he was often unable to pay government officials. Chamberlain does not seem to admire any of the Howard family who came to power after the death of Robert Cecil in 1612, nor James's favourites Robert Carr, and George Villiers.

== Style ==
Chamberlain's style is sober and objective, illuminated by an eye for the precise detail. The elements of this style are a sometimes artful, sometimes natural, blending of public and private information, of the serious and trivial, reported with care and exactitude and spiced with brisk remarks of his own. He explains and comments on his information, which he lays out as clearly as possible in a logical sequence, adding his own estimations of the value of the information and opinions he reports. His sentences are obviously crafted with care. Chamberlain's letters are those of an educated and cultivated man, who could quote French, Italian and Spanish, and who was familiar with old English and classical literature. Sometimes his humour is formulaic, however, and he was not above sending the same letter to two different correspondents. His figures of speech are not his own invention but taken from general use, often drawing on images of hunting, falconry, horseriding, farming, and seafaring. Chamberlain's style remains constant through the decades of his correspondence.

== Later years and death ==
Chamberlain's letters chart a change in the country's mood during the later years of his life. After Queen Elizabeth died, Chamberlain had drawn confidence from the continuance in office of Elizabeth's head-of-government Robert Cecil, whom he called "the great little lord". After Cecil's death in 1612, a certain disillusionment tinges Chamberlain's view of the world, along with a nostalgia for the good old days. In this, he reflected a shift in public opinion noted by historians.

Even in extreme old age, Chamberlain went on writing letters, though many of his correspondents had died and he was sometimes tempted to give up. When on one occasion he forgot to give Carleton a certain item of news, he remarked, "Whether it be that continual bad tidings hath taken away my taste, or that infirmity of age grows fast upon me, and makes me not regard how the world goes, seeing I am like to have so little part in it, for about the middle of the month I began to be septuagenarius". In his later days, Chamberlain became less inclined to venture abroad. He was also troubled by lawsuits after the death of his brother Richard left him chief heir and executor. "Now am I left alone of all my father's children, omnes composui, the last of eight brothers and sisters, and left to a troubled estate, not knowing how to wrestle with suits and law business and such tempestuous courses after so much tranquillity as I have hitherto lived in." Chamberlain, however, enjoyed reasonable health in his old age and continued to dodge London's epidemics and plague, though the cold was an increasing trouble to him. No letters from Chamberlain to Carleton survive after the latter's return to England in 1626.

Chamberlain signed his will on 18 June 1627, nine months before his death. He left gifts to charities, to poor prisoners, and to the inmates of Bedlam, as well as to many family members and friends, including Alice Carleton. He asked to be buried "with as little trouble and charge as may be answerable to the still and quiet course I have always thought to follow in my life-time".

== See also ==
- Jacobean era
- John Pory

== Bibliography ==
- Akrigg, G. P. V. Jacobean Pageant: The Court of King James I. New York: Atheneum, (1962) 1978. ISBN 0-689-70003-2.
- Lee, Maurice, Jr., ed. Introduction to Dudley Carleton to John Chamberlain: 1603–1624. Jacobean Letters, by Dudley Carleton. New Brunswick, NJ: Rutgers University Press, 1972. ISBN 0-8135-0723-5.
- McClure, Norman Egbert, ed. Letters, by John Chamberlain. London: Greenwood Press, 1979 edition. ISBN 0-313-20710-0.
- Notestein, Wallace. Four Worthies: John Chamberlain, Lady Anne Clifford, John Taylor, Oliver Heywood. London: Jonathan Cape, 1956. OCLC 1562848.
- Somerset, Anne. Elizabeth I. London: Phoenix, (1991) 1997 edition. ISBN 0-385-72157-9.
- Strong, Roy. Gloriana: The Portraits of Queen Elizabeth I. London: Pimlico, (1987) 2003. ISBN 0-7126-0944-X.
- Thomson, Elizabeth, ed. The Chamberlain Letters, by John Chamberlain. New York: Capricorn, 1966. OCLC 37697217.
- Willson, David Harris. King James VI & I. London: Jonathan Cape, (1956) 1963. ISBN 0-224-60572-0.
- Cooper, Thompson (1887). "Chamberlain, John (1553-1627)" . In Stephen, Leslie (ed.). Dictionary of National Biography. Vol. 10. London: Smith, Elder & Co. p. 2.
