= Old St. Paul's (novel) =

Novel by William Harrison Ainsworth

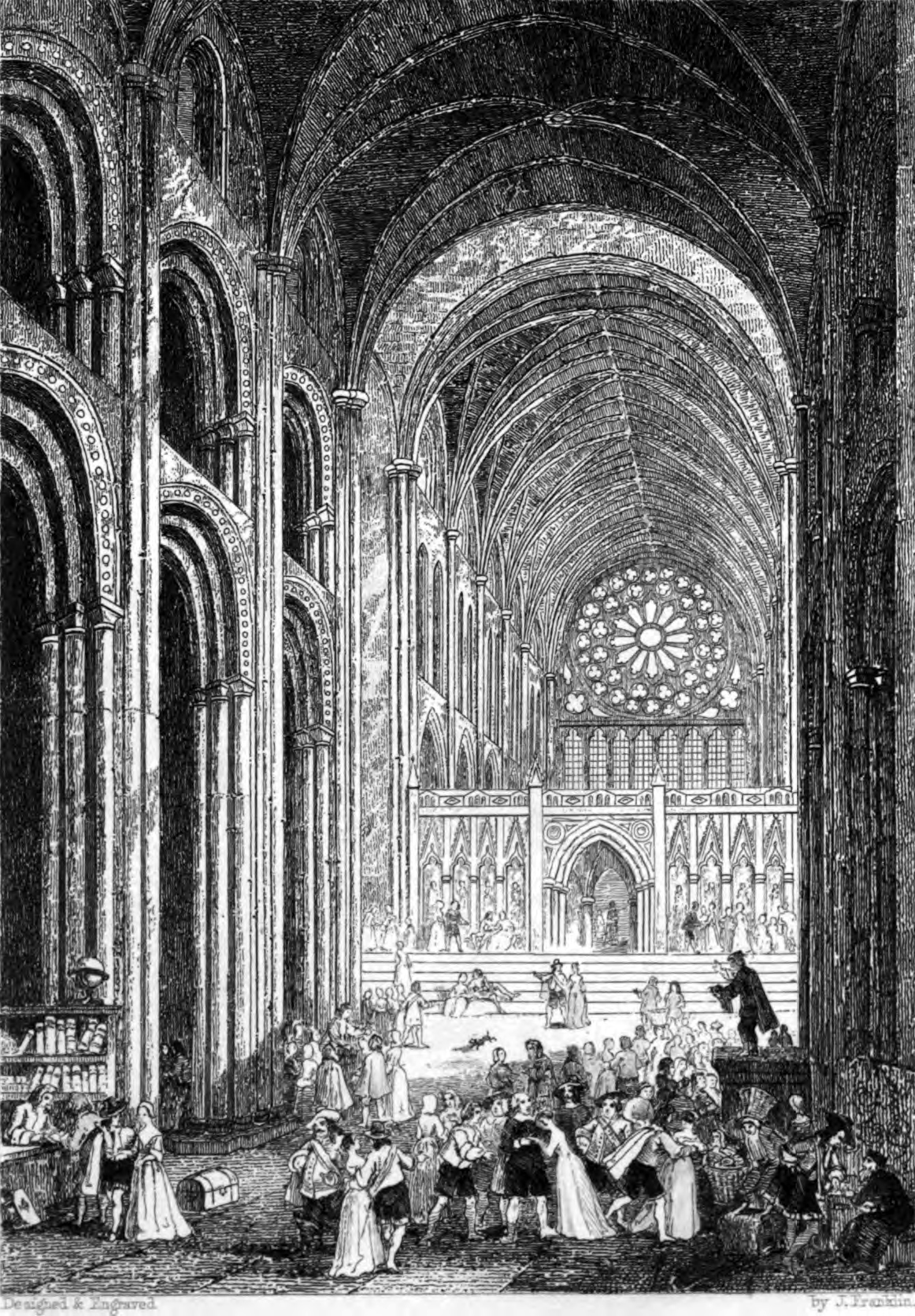
John Franklin's illustration of Paul's walk for Old St. Paul's

Old St. Paul's, also titled Old Saint Paul's: A Tale of the Plague and the Fire, is a novel by William Harrison Ainsworth serially published in 1841. It is a historical romance that describes the events of the Great Plague of London and the Great Fire of London. It was the basis for the 1914 silent film Old St. Paul's.

== Background ==
In 1840, Ainsworth published Guy Fawkes and The Tower of London. When their serial publications were completed at the end of the year, Ainsworth began writing Old St. Paul's, A Tale of the Plague and the Fire. Ainsworth, in a letter to James Crossley 7 December 1840, wrote: "You told me that you have a second part of De Foe's History of the Plague. Pray bring this with you. I will take the greatest care of it, but it is quite necessary I should see it, as I commence a new Romance with the New Year, under the title of The Plague of London. If you have any other tract relating to the period, or to the Fire, I shall feel obliged by the loan of it".

Old St. Paul's ran in The Sunday Times from 3 January 1841 to 26 December 1841, and he was one of the first writers to appear in a national paper in such a form. Ainsworth was paid £1,000 for the work with control of the copyright. The work was later illustrated when it was published in a three volume set by Cunningham.

== Story ==
The story of Old St. Paul's is spread over six books that range between April 1665 and September 1666 and details the events of the grocer Stephen Bloundel's life. Part of the story deals with the pursuit of Amabel, Bloundel's daughter, by Leonard Holt, the grocer's apprentice, while she in turn pursues Maurice Wyvil. This happens while a plague hits London, and St Paul's Cathedral is turned into a place to house the sick. During the plague, London is filled with plague victims while many characters, including Anselm Chowles and Mother Malmaynes, go around killing and robbing the sick. Bloundel seals his house to avoid the plague. While this happens, Holt wanders alone in London and catches the plague, and Amabel Bloundel goes away to marry Wyvil.

However, Wyvil, really John Wilmot, the Earl of Rochester, holds a fake marriage and uses it to trick Amabel into sleeping with him. When she finds out that the marriage was a fake, Amabel grows sick and soon dies. Eventually, Holt recovers from the plague and continues to wander London. While he wanders, he meets Nizza Macascree, a woman who soon falls in love with him. However, she is revealed to be Lady Isabella Argentine, which keeps Holt and Argentine from marriage. The London fires are started by a group of religious zealots. To try to prevent the fire, Holt plans to destroy buildings in the fire's path, which he does, and ends up saving King Charles II's life. In return, Holt is granted a title and is able to marry Argentine. The murderous thieves, Chowles and Malmayne, are killed during the fire when they are trapped beneath St. Paul's Cathedral as the fire destroys it. Eventually, Holt witnesses the rebuilding of the cathedral.

=== Characters ===
- Stephen Bloundel
- Leonard Holt
- Amabel Bloundel
- Maurice Wyvil/John Wilmot, 2nd Earl of Rochester
- Blaize
- Dr Hodges
- Solomon Eagle
- Anselm Chowles
- Mother Malmaynes
- Nizza Macascree/Lady Isabella Argentine
- King Charles II

=== Illustrations ===
Old St. Paul's was not illustrated by George Cruikshank, the illustrator of many of Ainsworth's works, and this caused problems between the two. It is uncertain why Ainsworth did not choose Cruikshank, and Cruikshank criticised Ainsworth in a pamphlet titled Artist and Author (1872). Here Cruikshank claims that he originated many of Ainsworth's works, including the original idea for Old St. Paul's which Ainsworth then stole. The original edition was not illustrated, but John Franklin made 20 illustrations for the three volume edition. Cruikshank was originally offered the position of illustrator before Franklin, but he turned it down based on too many prior commitments.

== Themes ==
While being connected to accounts of the plague and fire of London, much of Old St. Paul's is connected to the Book of Revelation. The novel begins with a sermon about judgment day, and Bloundel sought divine protection from the plague. The plague, to Bloundel, was a response by God to the sins of London and the corruption of the post-Restoration Court of Charles II. The character Hodges reinforces Bloundel's view, and statements about Charles II represents a Victorian view that they were morally superior to the previous times. The character Wyvil represents part of the vice inherent in the court, as he and his friends go so far as to gamble over their wives.

The prophetic character of Solomon Eagle serves to judge the city from on top of St. Paul's Cathedral, like Ezekiel from the Bible. He is similar to characters in at least two of Ainsworth's other novels, who give prophecies about the future: Elizabeth Orton from Guy Fawkes and Gunnora Braose from The Tower of London. However, Eagle describes what would happen to all of London, instead of giving a limited future dealing with only one individual. The prophecy comes true and is witnessed by Holt as he travels through the city. He describes what seems to him like the destruction of civilisation, as Bacchanalian revelry takes place in a church, while the city burns. Other incidents of social decay involve people ignoring helping their fellow man or, as the characters Malmaynes and Chowles do, simply murdering and robbing the sick. In the description of the events, Ainsworth depicts scenes similar to Edgar Allan Poe's later "The Masque of the Red Death" (1842).

The atmosphere of Old St. Pauls is that of a dark carnival. The standards of life are revealed, with the sick killed by those supposed to help; religion turned upside down, and death and destruction celebrated. At one point, Holt witnesses a "plague-pit" in the chapter "The Dance of Death". The pit was filled with dying bodies, which is described as a nightmarish sight. The description can serve as an allegorical depiction both of the cruelty and the suffering inherent to humanity.

== Sources ==
Ainsworth relied on Daniel Defoe's Journal of the Plague Year for information concerning the events of the plague and the fire of London. In an advertisement for the novel on 30 November 1841, Ainsworth admitted that portions of the tale were "founded on a narrative, which I have followed pretty closely in most of its details, contained in a very rare little volume, entitled ' Preparations against the Plague, both of Soul and Body' , the authorship of which I have no hesitation in assigning to DEFOE." The second Defoe work formed the basis for the character Bloundel while Defoe's Journal along with diaries from others who witnessed the events were the basis for other aspects of the novel. The character Eagle has a direct connection to the depiction of an individual with the same name in Defoe's work. This view is not limited to the setting of Old St. Paul's or to Ainsworth's time, but can apply to all of history including the violence in the 20th century.

== Critical response ==
R. H. Horne, in A New Spirit of the Age claimed that Old St. Paul's is a copy of Defoe's Journal of the Plague Year in addition to being "generally dull, except when it is revolting". Others viewed the connection more positively. The Bell's Life of London wrote, "Although the horrors of the Plague and Fire have already been described by various writers, and especially by Defoe, Mr. Ainsworth has in these volumes clothed those events in a manner the most exciting." The Courier said, "In this work, Mr. Ainsworth has portrayed many of the horrible incidents of the Great Plague with historical fidelity [...] The scenes described are all founded on well-authenticated accounts, presented by Mr. Ainsworth with a forcible semblance of reality, which his pen can so well accomplish."

A review in The Atlas states, "Two of the most appalling events in the history of London have been drawn into the work before us [...] and treated in Mr. Ainsworth's usual graphic style. It argues in favour of the skill with which these scourges of the great city are treated, that several of the descriptive passages made us literally shudder." The Observer claims,

We are glad to meet Mr. Ainsworth again in the region of historical romance, a department of literature in which he has already distinguished himself above every author of the day. A better subject than that chosen for his present volumes could not have been selected. It is replete with incidents of the most varied, striking, and affecting character. These Mr. Ainsworth has turned to the account which every reader of his former works must have been prepared to expect. He has interwoven historical facts into a web of most pleasing fiction, thereby investing history herself with new attraction. Many passages, indeed whole pages of the work, remind us of the simple pathos and truthfulness of Defoe. The plot is natural, and is conducted with great skill to the denouement. 'Old St. Paul's', we understand, has already met with a large sale. It will, with the aid of the illustrations, become one of the most popular of the author's very popular works.

The Athenaeum writes, "We prefer the two first volumes of 'Old St. Paul's' to any previous work of their author. Treated as a tale of adventure, the test of which is the hold retained on the reader, these volumes have great merit. The reader who has once opened them will hardly be disposed to lay them down again." A review by The Court Journal claims, "In this tale of the Plague and the Fire [...] we recognise all the excellences which have gained for Mr. Ainsworth so high a name on the scroll of historical literature. There is the same centralization of interest; few marked personages; a plot not too transparent, but of great simplicity; easy power, and most natural pathos in the more tragic portions; characteristic dialogue; and over all, a lucid style of expression."

In 1934, Malcolm Elwin argues, "several of his novels – particularly Tower of London and Old St. Paul's, in spite of the absurd antics of the hero of the latter – have undoubtedly the quality of durability. No writer could hope to surpass either as romantic histories of their particular subject." Leo Mason, in a 1939 article, says that "History through the eyes of romance is the essence of Ainsworth at his best – The Lancashire Witches, Tower of London, Old St. Paul's, are romantic histories and will no doubt endure."

George Worth, in 1972, describes the structure of the novel: "the rationale and the coherence of each part are clearly and persuasively worked out, and the contribution of each to the whole narrative requires no defense." In 2003, Stephen Carver claims, "Old St. Paul's certainly operates successful on considerably more levels than R. H. Horne will ever allow. It is a 'disaster story' worthy of Hollywood, where an all-star cast is introduced merely to be decimated by fire, flood, earthquake, shipwreck, alien invasion, or act of God. It is an apocalypse of biblical proportions, laced with love, intrigue, bravery, humour and horror."
