= Old St Paul's Cathedral =

Medieval cathedral of the City of London

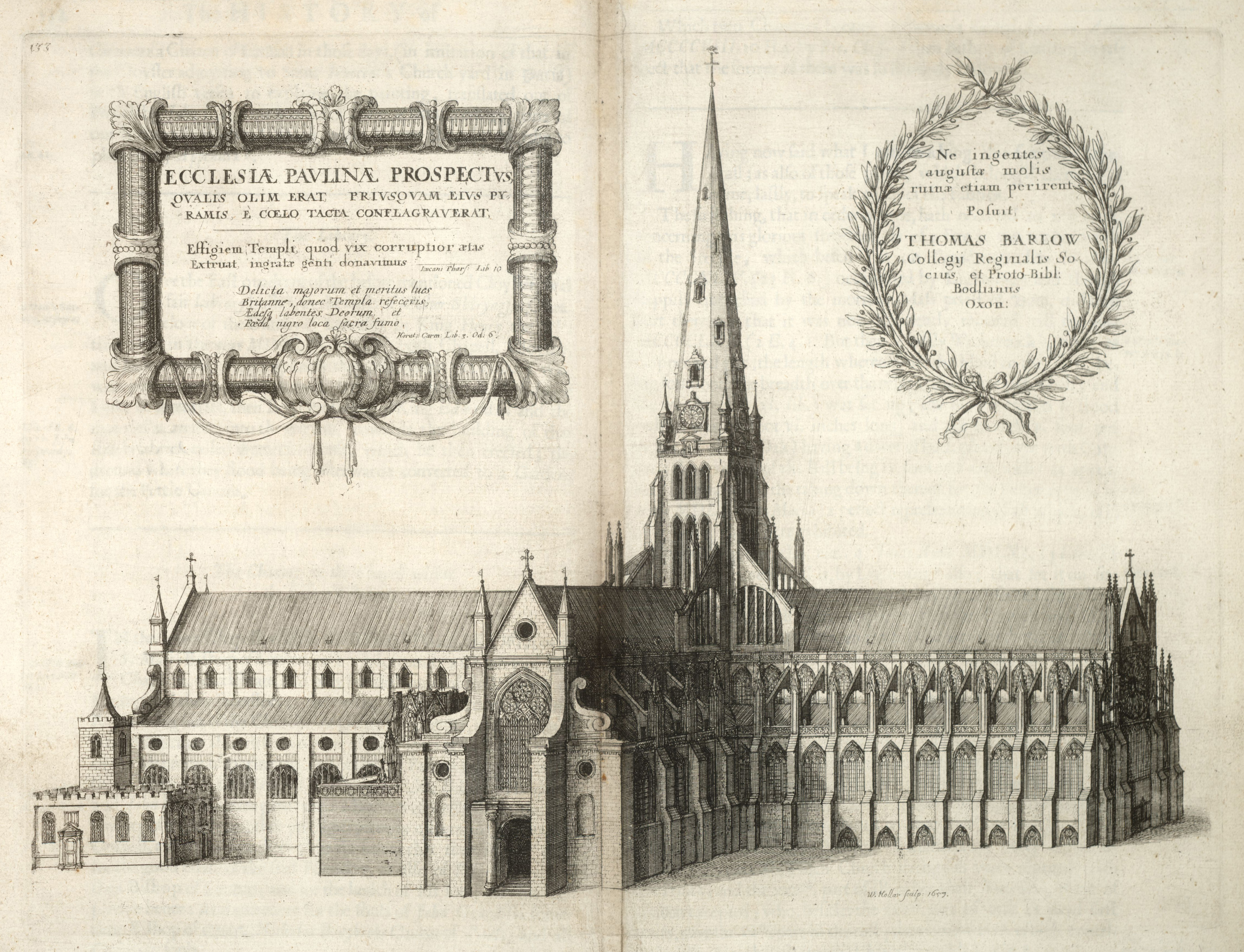
- Old St Paul's from the south, before the loss of its spire in 1561: an engraving by Wenceslaus Hollar of 1658

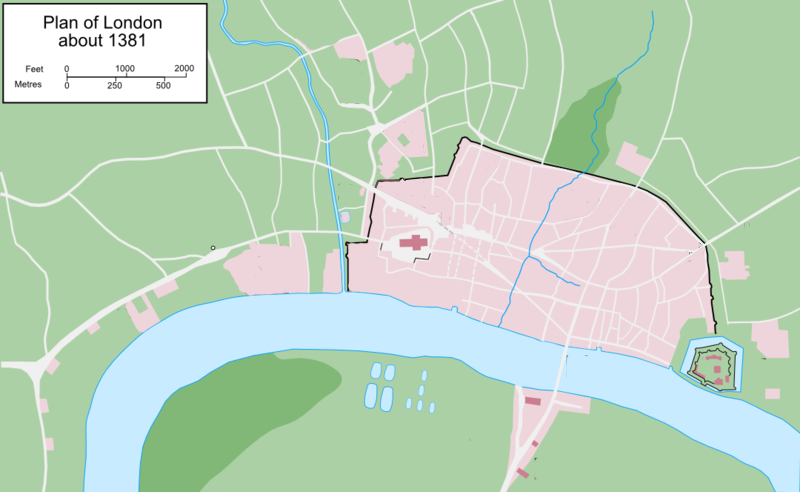
- Old St Paul's on a 1300 map of the City of London
- 51°30′49″N 0°5′54″W
- Denomination: Church of England
- Previous denomination: Roman Catholic

History
- Dedication: Saint Paul
- Events: Cathedral and canonry destroyed by fire – 1087, 1666

Architecture
- Previous cathedrals: 3
- Style: Romanesque, English Gothic
- Years built: c. 604–675; c. 685–961; c. 962–1087; 1087–1666

Specifications
- Length: 178 m (584 ft 0 in)
- Width: 88 m (288 ft 9 in)
- Height: 140–149 m (459 ft 4 in – 488 ft 10 in)

Administration
- Diocese: London
- Deanery: City of London; Paddington; St Margaret; St Marylebone

Clergy
- Bishop: Bishop of London
- Dean: Dean of St Paul's
- Building details

Record height
- Tallest in the world from 1221 to 1311^{[I]}
- Preceded by: Great Pyramid of Giza
- Surpassed by: Lincoln Cathedral

Old St Paul's Cathedral was the cathedral of the City of London that, until the Great Fire of 1666, stood on the site of the present St Paul's Cathedral. Built in 1087 and from 1255 to 1314, it was dedicated to Paul the Apostle. The building was perhaps the fourth such St Paul's cathedral church at this site on Ludgate Hill, going back to the 7th century.

Work on the cathedral began after a fire in 1087, which destroyed the previous church. Work took more than 200 years, and over that time the architecture of the church changed from Norman Romanesque to early English Gothic. The church was consecrated in 1240, enlarged in 1256 and again in the early 14th century. At its completion in the mid-14th century, the cathedral was one of the longest churches in the world, had one of the tallest spires and some of the finest stained glass.

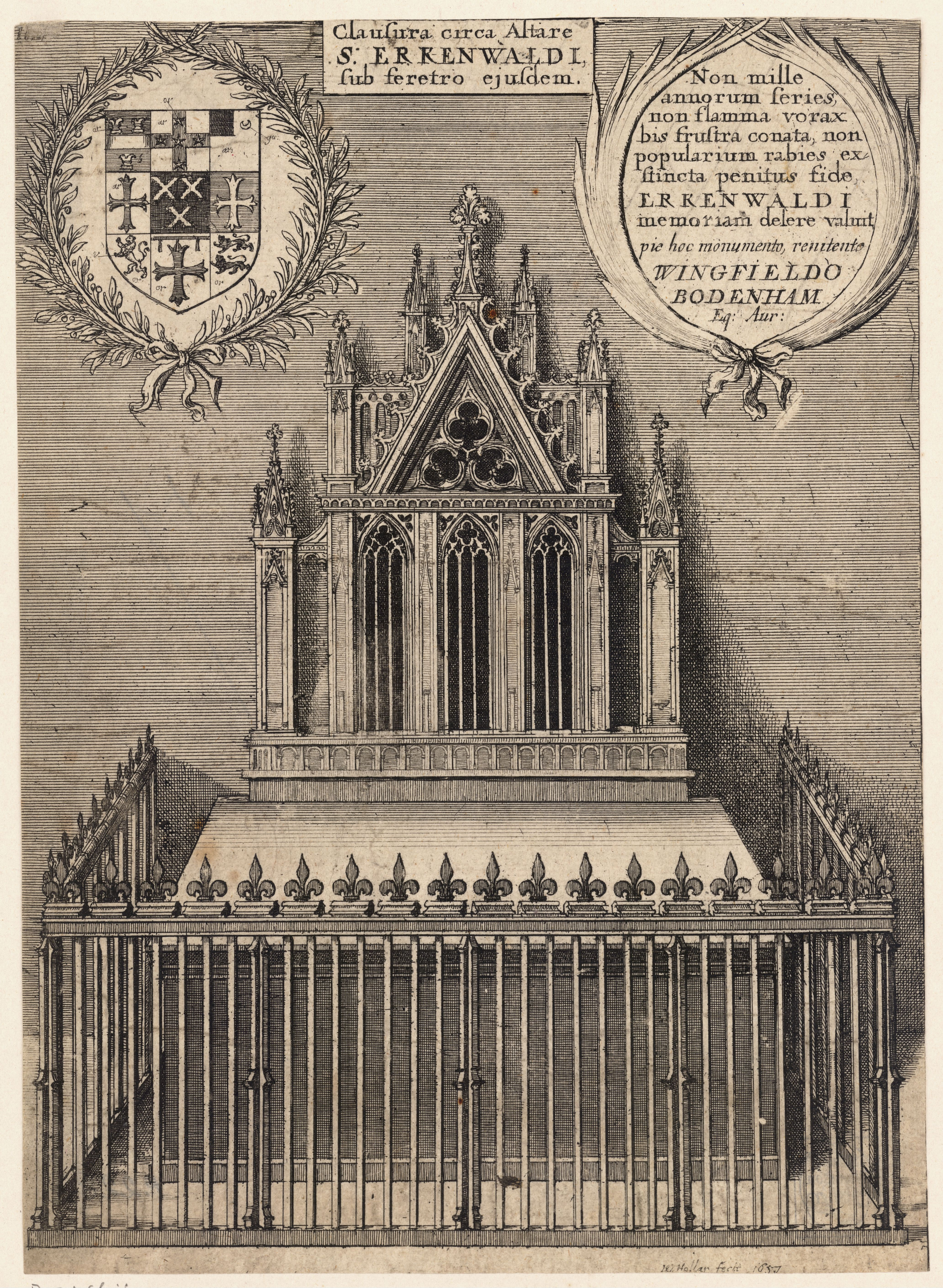
Shrine of St Erkenwald, relics removed 1550, lost as a monument in the Great Fire of London

The continuing presence of the shrine of the 7th century bishop Saint Erkenwald made the cathedral a site of pilgrimage in the Middle Ages. In addition to serving as the seat of the Diocese of London, the building developed a reputation as a social hub, with the nave aisle, "Paul's walk", known as a business centre and a place to hear the news and gossip on the London grapevine. During the Reformation, the open-air pulpit in the churchyard, St Paul's Cross, became the place for radical evangelical preaching and Protestant bookselling.

The cathedral was in structural decline by the early 17th century. The spire was destroyed by fire in 1561 and not replaced. Restoration work begun by Inigo Jones in the 1620s was temporarily halted during the English Civil War (1642–1651). In 1666, further restoration was in progress under Sir Christopher Wren when the cathedral was devastated in the Great Fire of London. At that point, it was demolished, and the present cathedral was built on the site.

== Construction ==
Colour-coded plan of the cathedral, showing various architectural styles

Old St Paul's Cathedral was perhaps the fourth church at Ludgate Hill dedicated to St Paul. A devastating fire in 1087, detailed in the Anglo-Saxon Chronicle, destroyed much of the cathedral. King William I (William the Conqueror) donated the stone from the destroyed Palatine Tower on the River Fleet towards the construction of a Romanesque Norman cathedral, an act sometimes said to be his last before death.

Bishop Maurice oversaw preparations, although it was primarily under his successor, Richard de Beaumis, that construction work fully commenced. Beaumis was assisted by King Henry I, who gave the bishop stone and asked that all material brought up the River Fleet for the cathedral should be free from toll. To fund the cathedral, Henry I gave Beaumis rights to all fish caught within the cathedral neighbourhood and tithes on venison taken in the County of Essex. Beaumis also gave a site for the original foundation of St Paul's School.

Henry I's death was followed by a period of unrest and civil war known as "The Anarchy". Henry of Blois, Bishop of Winchester, was appointed to administer the affairs of St Paul's. Almost immediately, he had to deal with the aftermath of a fire at London Bridge in 1135. It spread over much of the city, damaging the cathedral and delaying its construction. During this period, the architectural style was changed from heavy Romanesque to Early English Gothic. Although the base Norman columns were left alone, lancet pointed arches were placed over them in the triforium and some heavy columns were substituted with clustered pillars. The steeple was erected in 1221 and the cathedral was rededicated by Bishop Roger Niger in 1240. This steeple was reputedly measured at 520 feet (158 m) high in 1312.

=== New work (1255–1314) ===
After a succession of storms, in 1255 Bishop Fulk Basset appealed for money to repair the roof. The roof was rebuilt in wood, which ultimately ruined the building. At this time, the east end of the cathedral church was lengthened, enclosing the parish church of St Faith, which was now brought within the cathedral. The eastward addition was referred to as "The New Work".

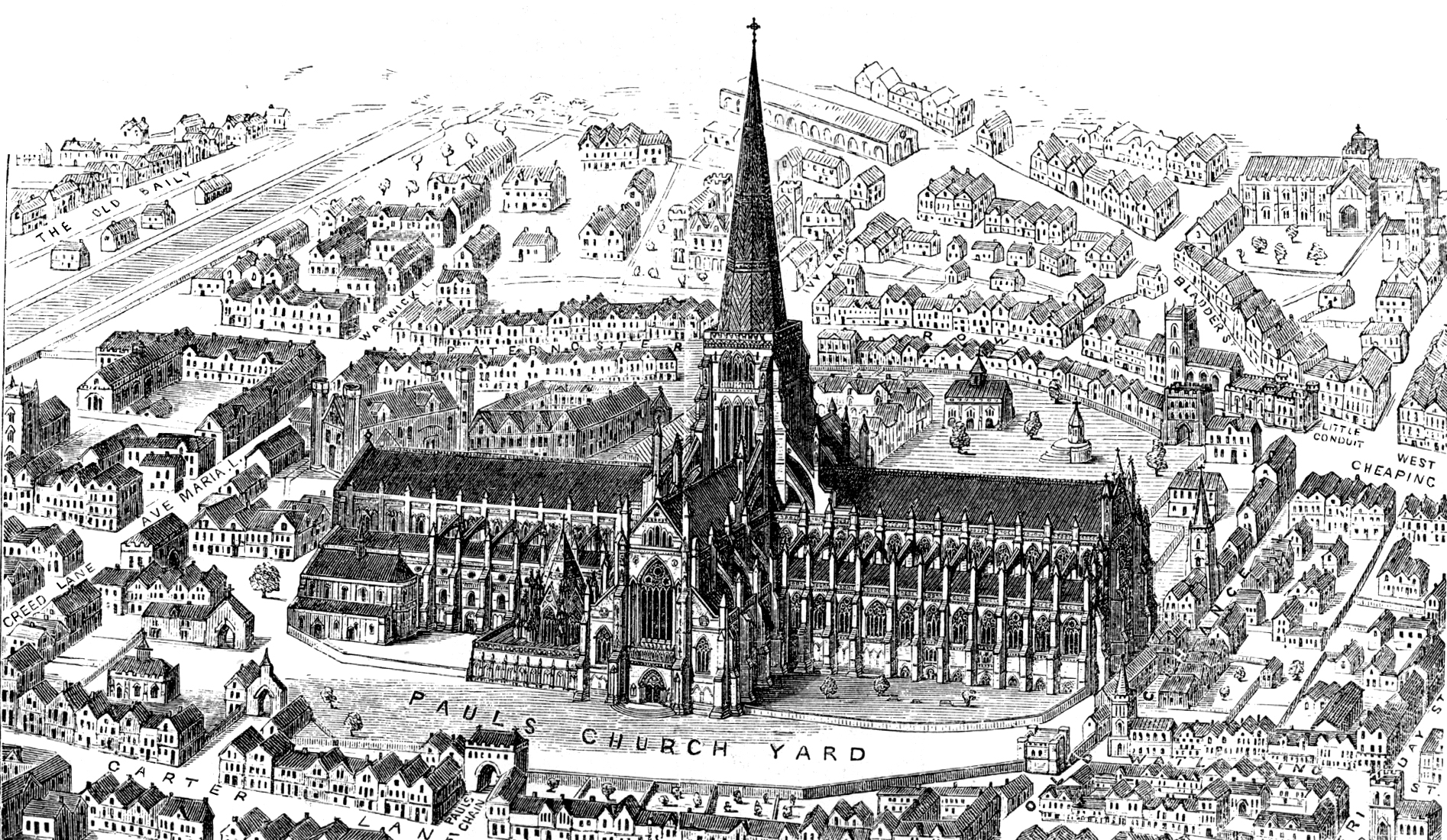
A 1916 engraving of Old St Paul's as it appeared before the fire of 1561 in which the spire was destroyed

After complaints from the dispossessed parishioners of St Faith's, the east end of the west crypt was allotted to them as their parish church. The congregation were also allowed to keep a detached tower with a peal of bells east of the church which had historically been used to peal the summons to the Cheapside Folkmote. The parish later moved to the Jesus chapel during the reign of Edward VI and was merged with St Augustine Watling Street after the 1666 fire.

This "New Work" was completed in 1314, although the additions had been consecrated in 1300. Excavations in 1878 by Francis Penrose showed the enlarged cathedral was 586 feet (179 m) long (excluding the porch later added by Inigo Jones) and 100 feet (30 m) wide (290 feet (88 m) across the transepts and crossing).

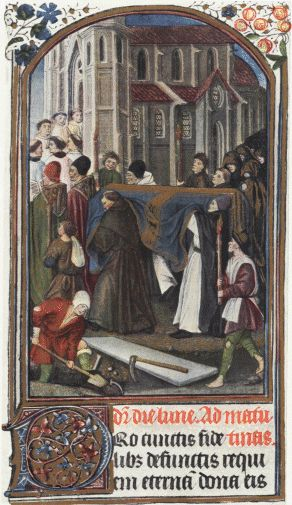
A 15th-century monastic funeral procession entering Old St Paul's. The coffin is covered by a blue and gold pall, and the grave is being dug in the foreground.

The cathedral had one of Europe's tallest church spires, the height of which is traditionally given as 489 feet (149 m), surpassing all but Lincoln Cathedral. (Note: The spire of the Old St Paul's Cathedral versus other possible medieval cathedral spires (like Lincoln's, all since destroyed), is an item of debate amongst experts. See History of the world's tallest structures for more information.) The King's Surveyor, Christopher Wren (1632–1723), judged that an overestimate and gave 460 feet (140 m). In 1664, Robert Hooke used a plumb-line to calculate the height of the tower as "two hundred and four feet very near, which is about sixty feet higher than it was usually reported to be." William Benham noted that the cathedral probably "resembled in general outline that of Salisbury, but it was a hundred feet longer, and the spire was sixty or eighty feet higher. The tower was open internally as far as the base of the spire, and was probably more beautiful both inside and out than that of any other English cathedral."

=== Chapter house ===
According to the architectural historian John Harvey, the octagonal chapter house, built about 1332 by William de Ramsey, was the earliest example of Perpendicular Gothic. This is confirmed by Alec Clifton-Taylor, who notes that the chapter house and St Stephen's Chapel at the medieval Westminster Palace predate the early Perpendicular work at Gloucester Cathedral by several years. The foundations of the chapter house were recently made visible in the redeveloped south churchyard of the new cathedral.

== Interior ==
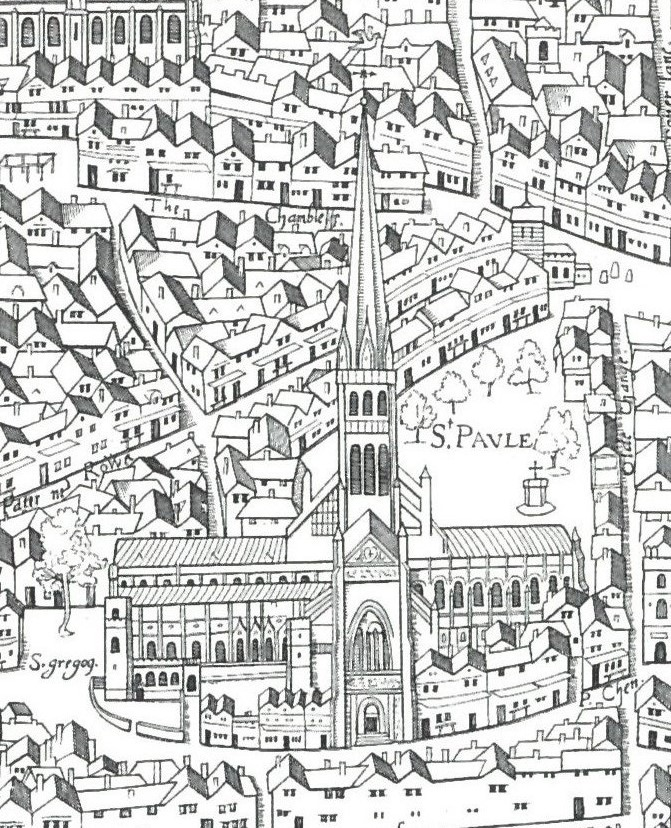
Old St Paul's, still with its spire, as shown on the "Copperplate" map of the 1550s

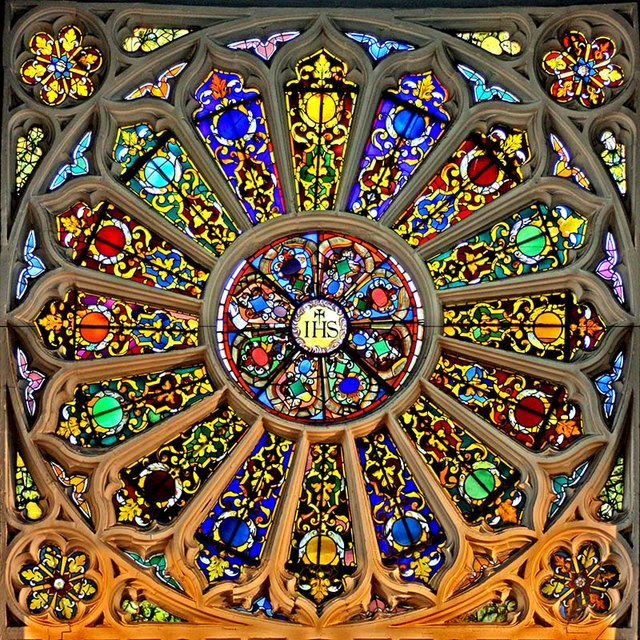
The 1630 rose window of St Katherine Cree (pictured) is said to have been a smaller version of that found in Old St Paul's.

The finished cathedral of the Middle Ages was renowned for the beauty of its interior. Canon William Benham wrote in 1902: "It had not a rival in England, perhaps one might say in Europe."

The nave's length was particularly notable, with a Norman triforium and vaulted ceiling. The length earned it the nickname "Paul's walk". The cathedral's stained glass was reputed to be the best in the country, and the east-end rose window was particularly exquisite. The poet Geoffrey Chaucer used the windows as a metaphor in "The Miller's Tale" from The Canterbury Tales, knowing that other Londoners at that time would understand the comparison:

His rode was red, his eyen grey as goose,
With Paule's windows carven on his shoes
In hosen red he went full fetisly.

From the cathedral's construction until its destruction, the shrine of Erkenwald was a popular pilgrimage site. Under Bishop Maurice, reports of miracles attributed to the shrine increased, with the shrine attracting thousands of pilgrims. The alliterative Middle English poem St Erkenwald (sometimes attributed to the 14th-century "Pearl Poet") begins with a description of the construction of the cathedral, referring to the building as the "New Werke".

The shrine was adorned with gold, silver and precious stones. In 1339, three London goldsmiths were employed for a whole year to rebuild the shrine to a higher standard. William Dugdale records that the shrine was pyramidal in shape with an altar table placed in front for offerings.

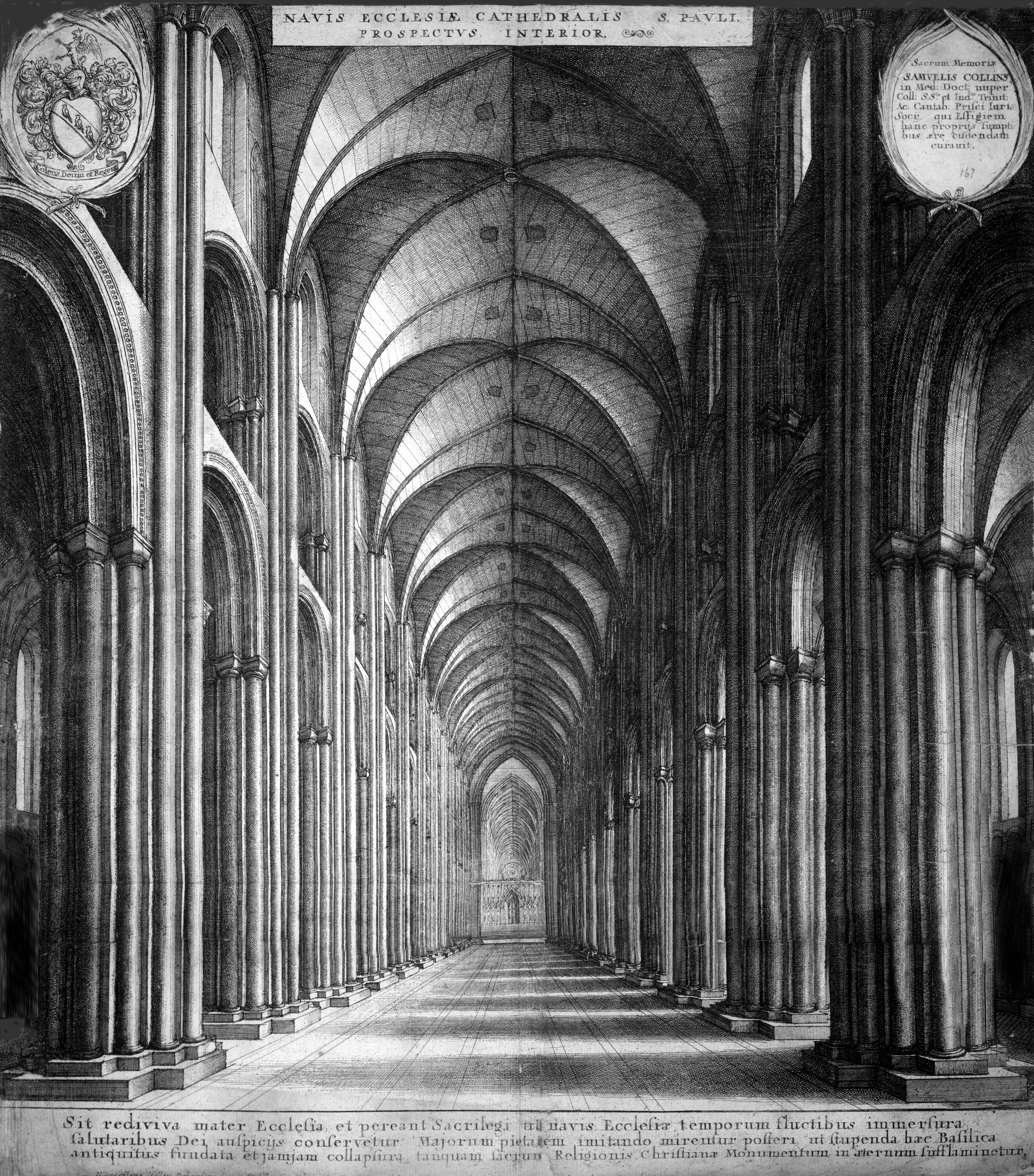
Wenceslas Hollar's engraving of the cathedral nave, "Paul's walk"

Monarchs and other notables were often in attendance at the cathedral, and the court occasionally held sessions there. The building was also the place of several incidents. In 1191, whilst King Richard I was in Palestine, his brother John summoned a council of bishops to St Paul's to denounce William de Longchamp, Bishop of Ely – to whom Richard had entrusted government affairs – for treason.

Later that year, William Fitz Osbern gave a speech against the oppression of the poor at Paul's Cross and incited a riot which saw the cathedral invaded, halted by a plea from Hubert Walter, Archbishop of Canterbury. Osbern barricaded himself in St Mary-le-Bow and was executed, after which Paul's Cross was silent for many years.

Arthur, Prince of Wales, son of Henry VII, married Catherine of Aragon in St Paul's on 14 November 1501. Chroniclers are profuse in their descriptions of the decorations of the cathedral and city on that occasion. Arthur died five months later, at the age of 15, and the marriage was later proved contentious during the reign of his brother, Henry VIII.

Several kings of the Middle Ages lay in state in St Paul's before their funerals at Westminster Abbey, including Richard II, Henry VI and Henry VII. In the case of Richard II, the display of his body in such a public place was to dispel rumours that he was not dead. The walls were lined with the tombs of bishops and nobility. In addition to the shrine of Erkenwald, two Anglo-Saxon kings were buried inside: Sebbi, King of the East Saxons, and Æthelred the Unready.

A number of figures such as John of Gaunt, 1st Duke of Lancaster and John de Beauchamp, 1st Baron Beauchamp de Warwick had particularly large monuments constructed within the cathedral, and the building later contained the tombs of the Crown minister Nicholas Bacon, Sir Philip Sidney, and John Donne. Donne's monument survived the 1666 fire, and is on display in the present building.

== Paul's Walk ==
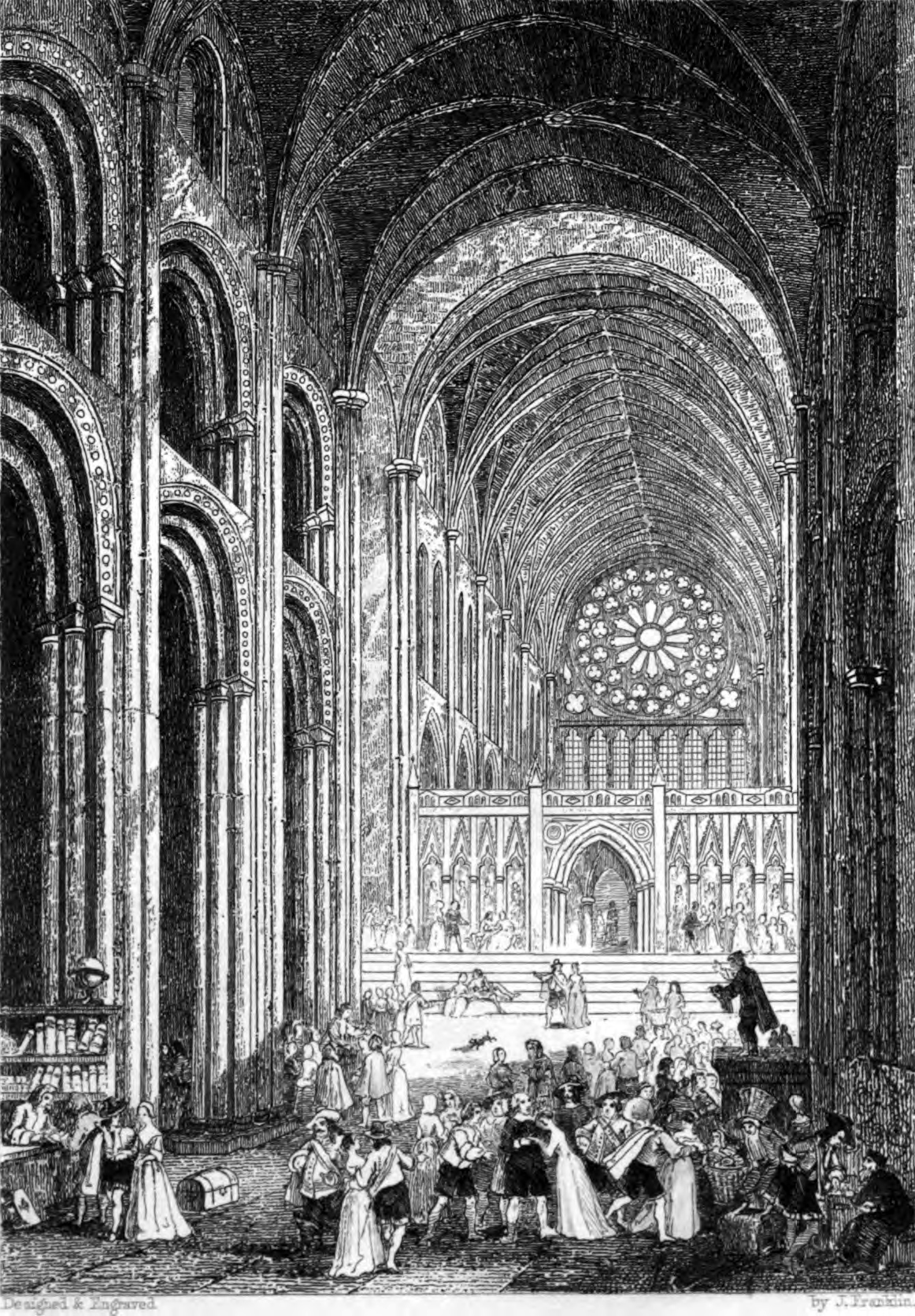
John Franklin's illustration of Paul's Walk for William Harrison Ainsworth's 1841 novel Old Saint Paul's

The first historical reference to the nave, "Paul's walk", being used as a marketplace and general meeting area is recorded during the 1381–1404 tenure of Bishop Braybrooke. The bishop issued an open letter decrying the use of the building for selling "wares, as if it were a public market" and "others ... by the instigation of the Devil [using] stones and arrows to bring down the birds, jackdaws and pigeons which nestle in the walls and crevices of the building. Others play at ball ... breaking the beautiful and costly painted windows to the amazement of spectators." His decree goes on to threaten perpetrators with excommunication.

By the 15th century, the cathedral had become the centre of the London grapevine. "News mongers", as they were called, gathered there to pass on the latest news and gossip. Those who visited the cathedral to keep up with the news were known as "Paul's walkers".

According to Francis Osborne (1593–1659):

It was the fashion of those times ... for the principal gentry, lords, courtiers, and men of all professions not merely mechanic, to meet in Paul's Church by eleven and walk in the middle aisle till twelve, and after dinner from three to six, during which times some discoursed on business, others of news. Now in regard of the universal there happened little that did not first or last arrive here ... And those news-mongers, as they called them, did not only take the boldness to weigh the public but most intrinsic actions of the state, which some courtier or other did betray to this society.

St Paul's became the place to go to hear the latest news of current affairs, war, religion, parliament and the court. In his play Englishmen for my Money, William Haughton (d. 1605) described Paul's walk as a kind of "open house" filled with a "great store of company that do nothing but go up and down, and go up and down, and make a grumbling together".

Infested with beggars and thieves, Paul's walk was also a place to pick up gossip, topical jokes, and even prostitutes. In his Microcosmographie (1628), a series of satirical portraits of contemporary England, John Earle (1601–1665), described it thus:

[Paul's walk] is the land's epitome, or you may call it the lesser isle of Great Britain. It is more than this, the whole world's map, which you may here discern in its perfectest motion, justling and turning. It is a heap of stones and men, with a vast confusion of languages; and were the steeple not sanctified, nothing liker Babel. The noise in it is like that of bees, a strange humming or buzz mixed of walking tongues and feet: it is a kind of still roar or loud whisper ... It is the great exchange of all discourse, and no business whatsoever but is here stirring and a-foot ... It is the general mint of all famous lies, which are here like the legends of popery, first coined and stamped in the church.

== Decline (16th century) ==
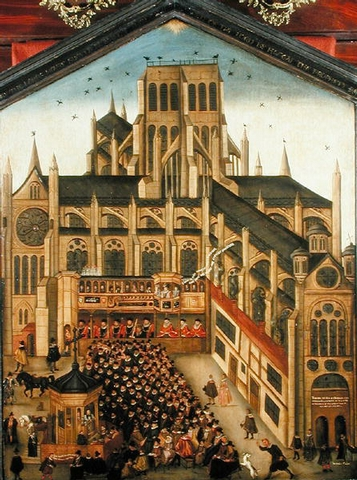
A sermon preached from St Paul's Cross (bottom left) in 1614

By the 16th century the building was deteriorating. Under Henry VIII and Edward VI, the dissolution of the monasteries and Chantries Acts led to the destruction of interior ornamentation and the cloisters, charnels, crypts, chapels, shrines, chantries and other buildings in the churchyard.

Many of these former religious sites in St Paul's Churchyard, having been seized by the crown, were sold as shops and rental properties, especially to printers and booksellers, such as Thomas Adams, who were often Protestants. Buildings that were razed often supplied ready-dressed building material for construction projects, such as the Lord Protector's city palace, Somerset House.

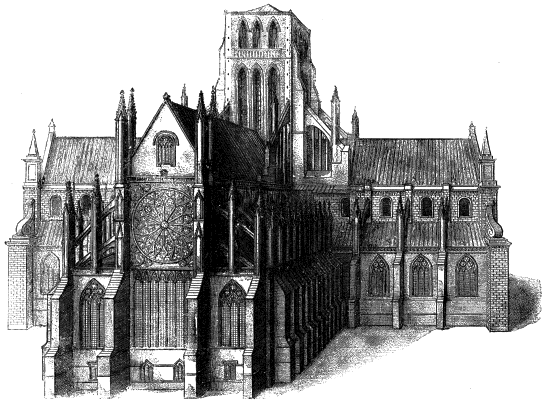
Rose window of Old St Paul's Cathedral (spire no longer in place after the fire of 1561)

Crowds were drawn to the northeast corner of the Churchyard, St Paul's Cross, where open-air preaching took place. It was there in the Cross Yard in 1549 that radical Protestant preachers incited a mob to destroy many of the cathedral's interior decorations. In 1554, in an attempt to end inappropriate practices taking place in the nave, the Lord Mayor decreed that the church should return to its original purpose as a religious building, issuing a writ stating that the selling of horses, beer and "other gross wares" was "to the great dishonour and displeasure of Almighty God, and the great grief also and offence of all good and well-disposed persons".

=== Spire collapse (1561) ===
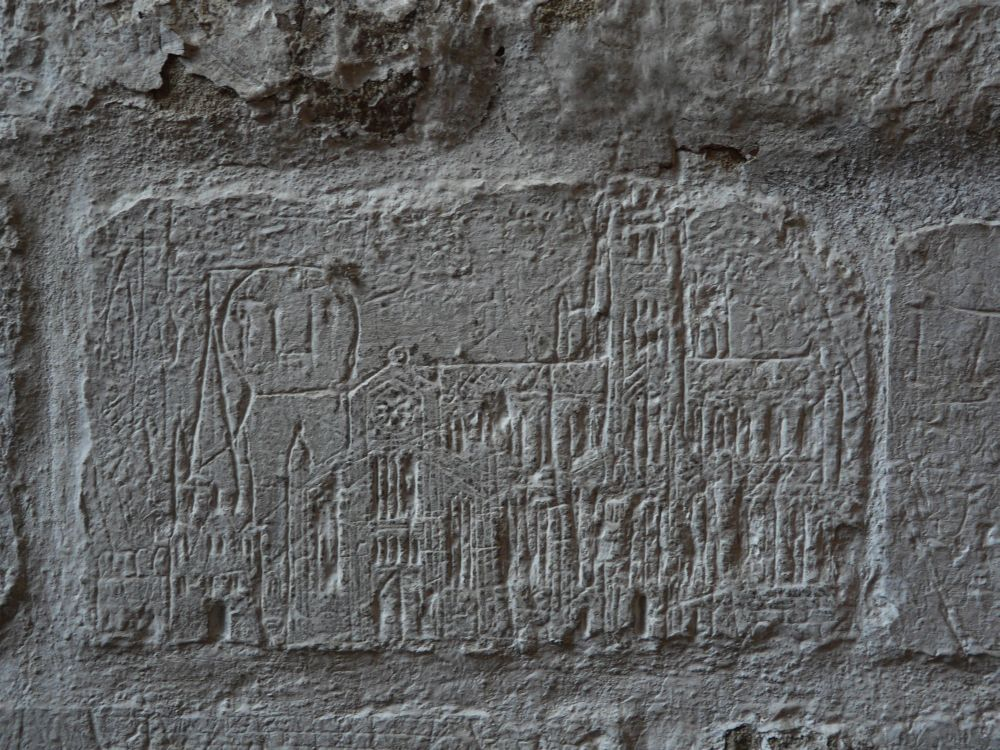
A graffito executed on a wall of St Mary's Church, Ashwell in Hertfordshire is believed to show Old St Paul's Cathedral.

On 4 June 1561, the spire caught fire and crashed through the nave roof. According to a newsheet published days after the fire, the cause was a lightning strike. In 1753, David Henry, a writer for The Gentleman's Magazine, revived a rumour in his Historical description of St Paul's Cathedral, writing that a plumber had "confessed on his death bed" that he had "left a pan of coals and other fuel in the tower when he went to dinner." However, the number of contemporary eyewitnesses to the storm and a subsequent investigation appears to contradict this.

Whatever the cause, the subsequent conflagration was hot enough to melt the cathedral's bells and the lead covering the wooden spire "poured down like lava upon the roof", destroying it. This event was taken by both Protestants and Catholics as a sign of God's displeasure at the other faction's actions. Queen Elizabeth I contributed £1,000 in gold towards the cost of repairs as well as timber from the royal estate and the Bishop of London Edmund Grindal gave £1200, although the spire was never rebuilt. The repair work on the nave roof was sub-standard, and only fifty years after the rebuilding was in a dangerous condition.

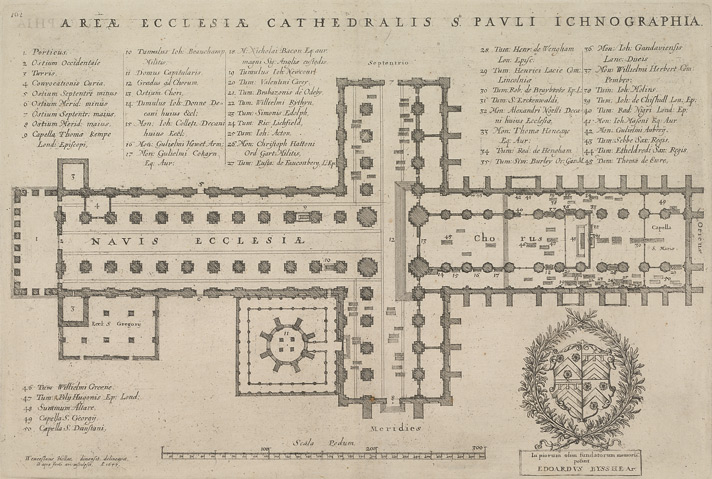
Wenceslaus Hollar's 1658 plan of the cathedral

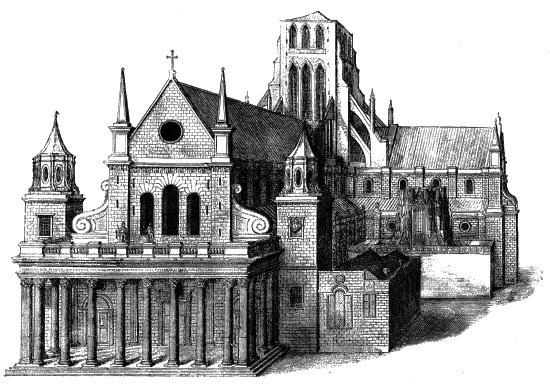
Classical-style West Front by Inigo Jones, added between 1630 and 1666

=== Restoration work (1621–1666) ===
Concerned at the decaying state of the building, King James I appointed the classical architect Inigo Jones to restore the building. The poet Henry Farley records the king comparing himself to the building at the commencement of the work in 1621: "I have had more sweeping, brushing and cleaning than in forty years before. My workmen looke like him they call Muldsacke after sweeping of a chimney."

In addition to cleaning and rebuilding parts of the Gothic structure, Jones added a classical-style portico to the cathedral's west front in the 1630s, which William Benham notes was "altogether incongruous with the old building ... It was no doubt fortunate that Inigo Jones confined his work at St Paul's to some very poor additions to the transepts, and to a portico, very magnificent in its way, at the west end."

Work stopped during the English Civil War, and there was much defacement and mistreatment of the building by Parliamentarian forces during which old documents and charters were dispersed and destroyed, and the nave used as a stable for cavalry horses. Much of the detailed information historians have of the cathedral is taken from William Dugdale's 1658 History of St Pauls Cathedral, written hastily during The Protectorate for fear that "one of the most eminent Structures of that kinde in the Christian World" might be destroyed.

Indeed, a persistent rumour of the time suggested that Cromwell had considered giving the building to London's returning Jewish community to become a synagogue. Dugdale embarked on his project due to discovering hampers full of decaying 14th and 15th century documents from the cathedral's early archives. In his book's dedicatory epistle, he wrote:

... so great was your foresight of what we have since by wofull experience seen and felt, and specially in the Church, (through the Presbyterian contagion, which then began violently to breake out) that you often and earnestly incited me to a speedy view of what Monuments I could, especially in the principall Churches of this Realme; to the end, that by Inke and paper, the Shadows of them, with their Inscriptions might be preserved for posteritie, forasmuch as the things themselves were so neer unto ruine.

Dugdale's book is also the source for many of the surviving engravings of the building, created by Bohemian etcher Wenceslaus Hollar. In July 2010, an original sketch for Hollar's engravings was rediscovered when it was submitted to Sotheby's auction house.

== Great Fire of London (1666) ==
After the restoration of the monarchy, King Charles II appointed Sir Christopher Wren to the position of Surveyor to the King's Works. He was given the task of restoring the cathedral in a style matching Inigo Jones' classical additions of 1630. Wren instead recommended that the building be completely demolished; according to his first biographer, James Elmes, Wren "expressed his surprise at the carelessness and want of accuracy in the original builders of the structure"; Wren's son described the new design as "The Gothic rectified to a better manner of architecture".

Both the clergy and citizens of the city opposed such a move. In response, Wren proposed to restore the body of the gothic building, but replace the existing tower with a dome. He wrote in his 1666 Of the Surveyor's Design for repairing the old ruinous structure of St Paul's:

It must be concluded that the Tower from Top to Bottom and the adjacent parts are such a heap of deformaties that no Judicious Architect will think it corrigible by any Expense that can be laid out upon new dressing it.

Wren, whose uncle Matthew Wren was Bishop of Ely, admired the central lantern of Ely Cathedral and proposed that his dome design could be constructed over the top of the existing gothic tower, before the old structure was removed from within. This, he reasoned, would prevent the need for extensive scaffolding and would not upset Londoners ("Unbelievers") by demolishing a familiar landmark without being able to see its "hopeful Successor rise in its stead."

The matter was still under discussion when the restoration work on St Paul's finally began in the 1660s but soon after being sheathed in wooden scaffolding, the building was completely gutted in the Great Fire of London of 1666. The fire, aided by the scaffolding, destroyed the roof and much of the stonework along with masses of stocks and personal belongings that had been placed there for safety. Samuel Pepys recalls the building in flames in his diary:

Up by five o'clock, and blessed be God! find all well, and by water to Paul's Wharf. Walked thence and saw all the town burned, and a miserable sight of Paul's Church, with all the roof fallen, and the body of the choir fallen into St. Faith's; Paul's School also, Ludgate, and Fleet Street.

John Evelyn's account paints a similar picture of destruction:

September 3rd – I went and saw the whole south part of the City burning from Cheapeside to the Thames, and ... was now taking hold of St Paule's Church, to which the scaffolds contributed exceedingly.
September 7th – I went this morning on foote from White-hall as far as London Bridge, thro' the late Fleete-streete, Ludgate Hill, by St Paules ... At my returne I was infinitely concern'd to find that goodly Church St Paules now a sad ruine, and that beautiful portico ... now rent in pieces, flakes of vast stone split asunder, and nothing now remaining intire but the inscription in the architrave, shewing by whom it was built, which had not one letter of it defac'd. It was astonishing to see what immense stones the heate had in a manner calcin'd, so that all the ornaments, columns, freezes, capitals, and projectures of massie Portland-stone flew off, even to the very roofe, where a sheet of lead covering a great space (no less than six akers by measure) was totally mealted; the ruines of the vaulted roofe falling broke into St. Faith's, which being fill'd with the magazines of bookes belonging to the Stationers, and carried thither for safety, they were all consum'd, burning for a weeke following. It is also observable that the lead over the altar at the East end was untouch'd, and among the divers monuments, the body of one Bishop remain'd intire. Thus lay in ashes that most venerable Church, one of the most antient pieces of early piety in the Christian world.

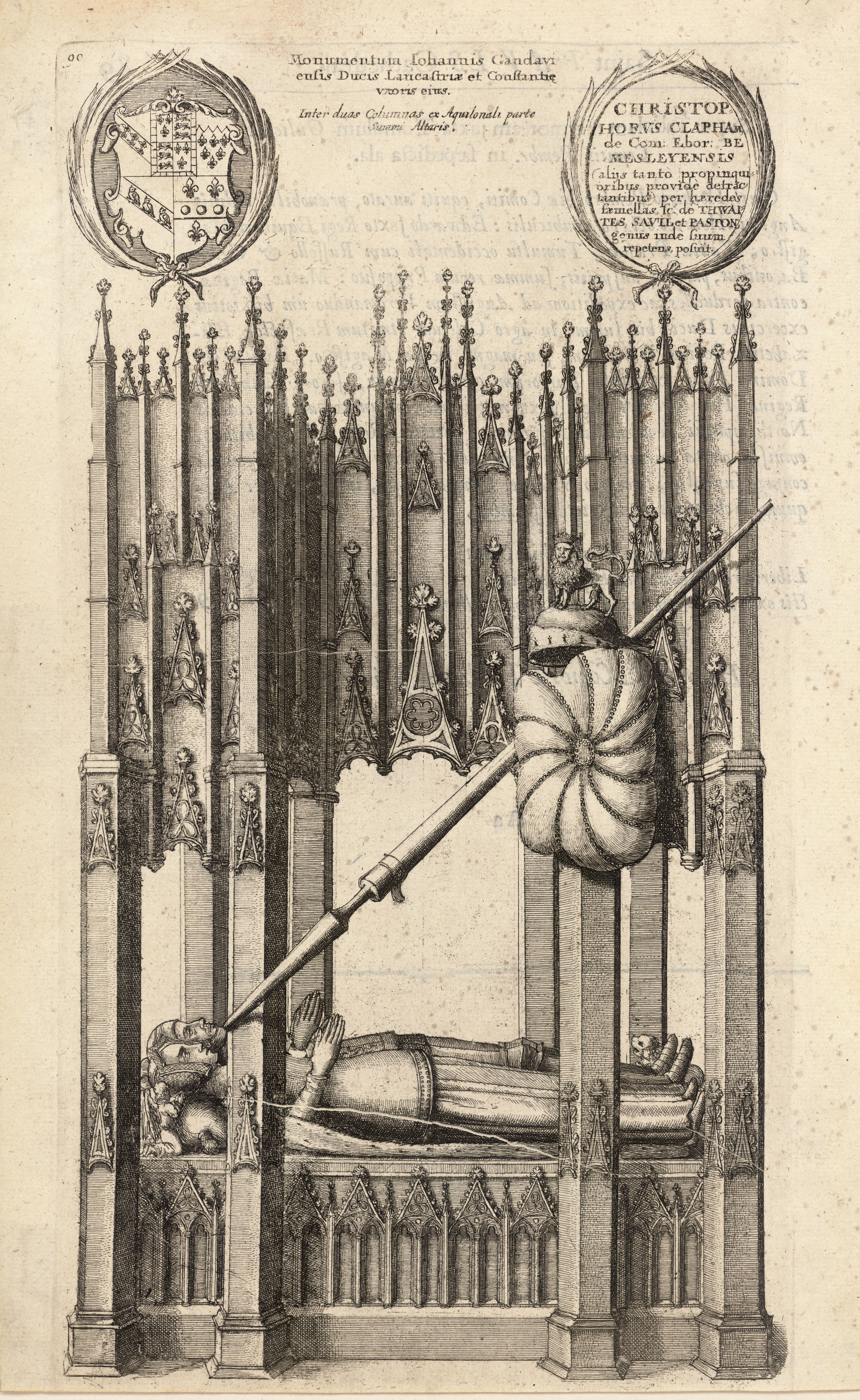
The tomb of John of Gaunt and Blanche of Lancaster in the choir of St Paul's Cathedral, as represented in an etching of 1658 by Wenceslaus Hollar. The etching includes a number of inaccuracies, for example in not showing the couple with joined hands. The tomb was lost in the Great Fire of 1666.

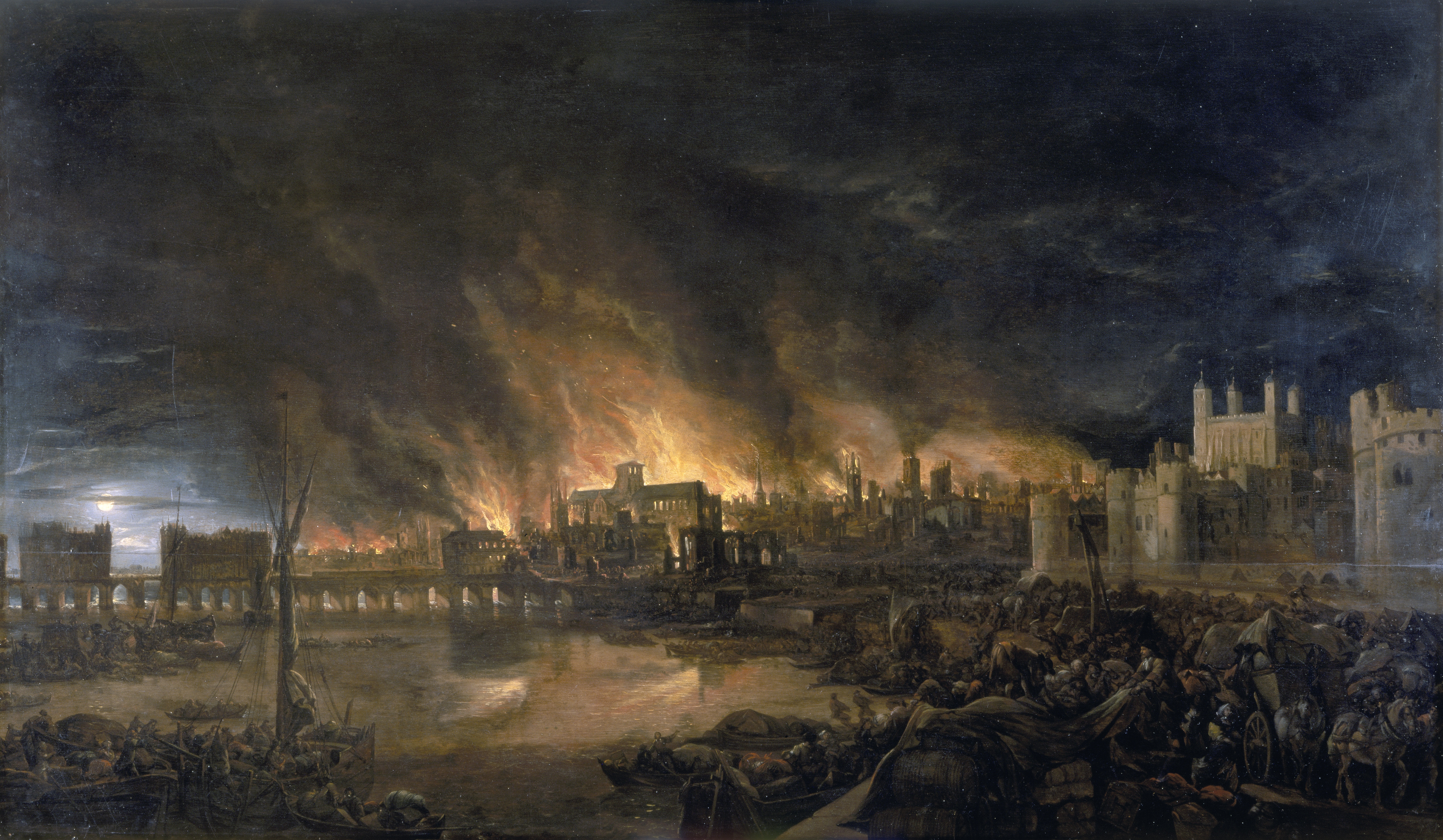
The Great Fire of London, depicted by an unknown painter (1675), as it would have appeared from a boat in the vicinity of Tower Wharf on the evening of Tuesday, 4 September 1666. To the left is London Bridge; to the right, the Tower of London. St Paul's Cathedral is in the distance, surrounded by the tallest flames.

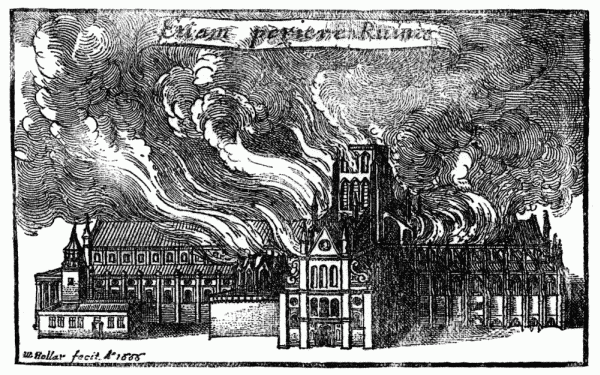
Old St Paul's Cathedral in flames, 1666

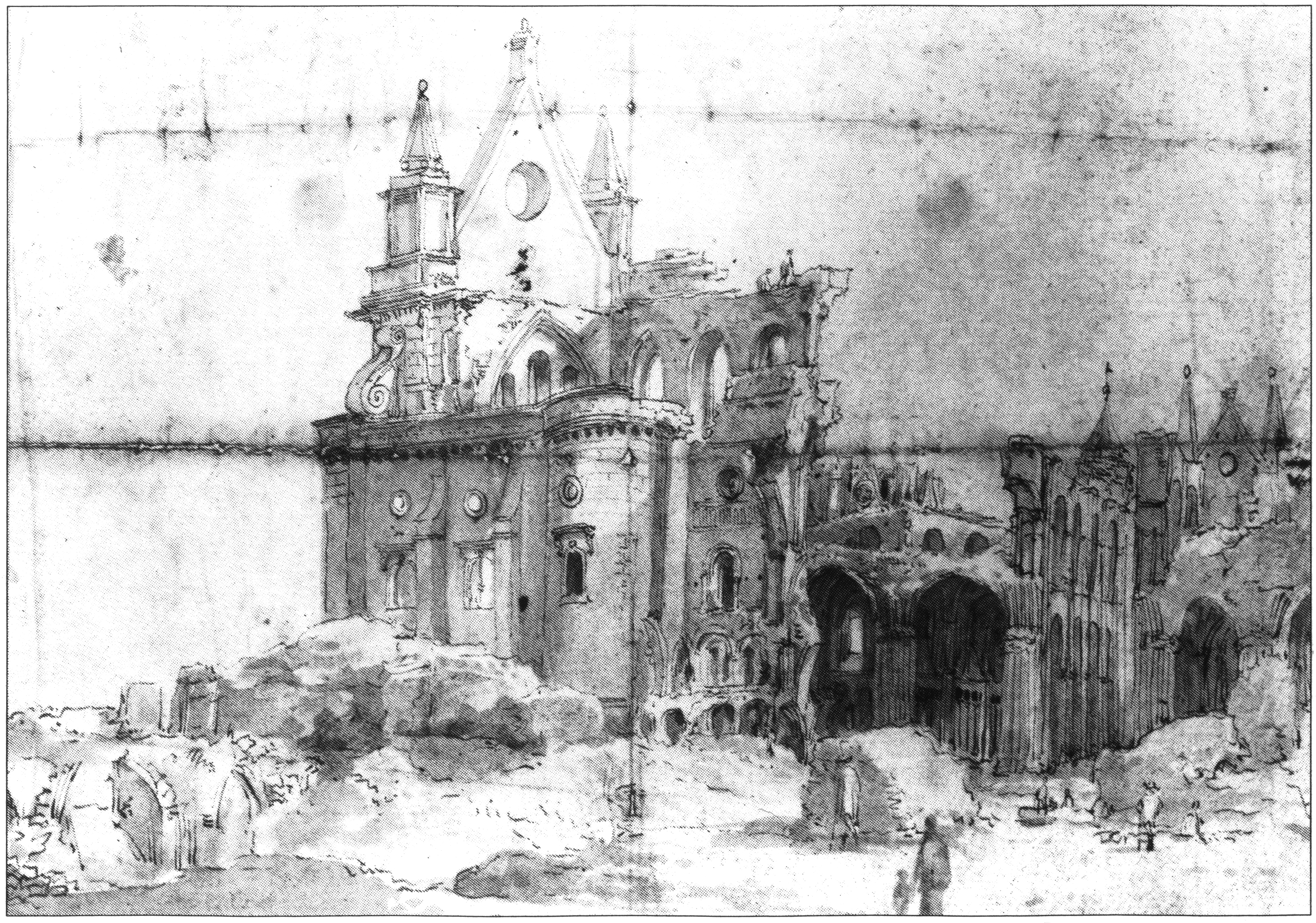
Remains of the Cathedral after the fire drawn by Thomas Wyck, c. 1673

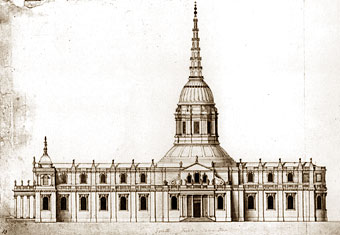
Sir Christopher Wren's approved "warrant design"

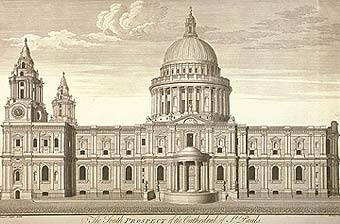
Sir Christopher Wren's final design for the new cathedral

=== Aftermath ===
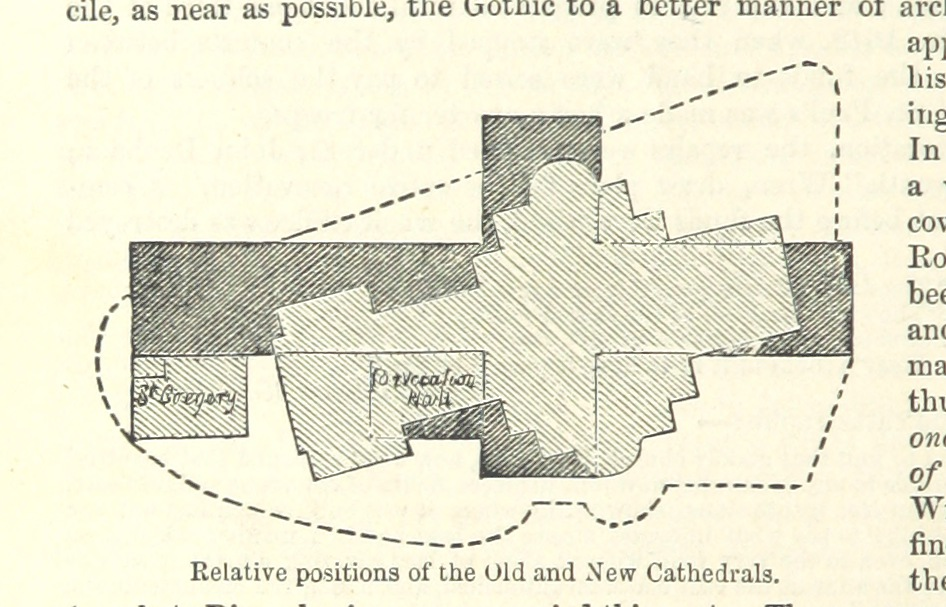
An 1871 illustration showing the positions of the old and new St Paul Cathedrals

Temporary repairs were made to the building. While it might have been salvageable, albeit with almost complete reconstruction, a decision was taken to build a new cathedral in a modern style instead, a step which had been contemplated even before the fire. Wren declared that it was impossible to restore the old building.

The following April, the Dean William Sancroft wrote to him that he had been right in his judgement: "Our work at the west end," he wrote, "has fallen about our ears." Two pillars had collapsed, and the rest was so unsafe that men were afraid to go near, even to pull it down. He added, "You are so absolutely necessary to us that we can do nothing, resolve on nothing without you."

After this declaration by the Dean, demolition of the remains of the old cathedral began in 1668. Demolition of the Old Cathedral proved unexpectedly difficult as the stonework had been bonded together by molten lead. Wren initially used the then-new technique of using gunpowder to bring down the surviving stone walls. Like many experimental techniques, the use of gunpowder was not easy to control; several workers were killed and nearby residents complained about noise and damage. Eventually, Wren resorted to using a battering ram instead. Building work on the new cathedral began in June 1675.

Wren's first proposal, the "Greek cross" design, was considered too radical by members of a committee commissioned to rebuild the church. Members of the clergy decried the design as being too dissimilar from churches that already existed in England at the time to suggest any continuity within the Church of England. Wren's approved "Warrant design" sought to reconcile the Gothic with his "better manner of architecture", featuring a portico influenced by Inigo Jones' addition to the old cathedral. However, Wren received permission from the king to make "ornamental changes" to the submitted design, and over the course of the construction made significant alterations, including the addition of the famous dome.

The topping out of the new cathedral took place in October 1708 and the cathedral was declared officially complete by Parliament in 1710. The consensus on the finished building was mixed; James Wright (1643–1713) wrote "Without, within, below, above the eye/ Is filled with unrestrained delight." Meanwhile, others were less approving, noting its similarity to St Peter's Basilica in Rome: "There was an air of Popery about the gilded capitals, the heavy arches ... They were unfamiliar, un-English."

== Notable burials in Old St Paul's ==
Nicholas Stone's 1631 monument to John Donne survived the fire. It depicts the poet, standing upon an urn, dressed in a winding cloth, rising for the moment of judgment. This depiction, Donne's own idea, was sculpted from a painting for which he posed.

No further memorials or tombs survive of the many famous people buried at Old St Paul's. In 1913 the letter-cutter MacDonald Gill and Mervyn Macartney created a new tablet with the names of lost burials which was installed in Wren's cathedral:

- Sæbbi King of Essex (d. 695)
- King Æthelred II ("the Unready") (d. 1016)
- Edward the Exile (d. 1057), exiled son of Edmund Ironside
- Henry de Lacy, 3rd Earl of Lincoln (d. 1311), confidant of King Edward I
- Sir John de Pulteney (d. 1349), four times Mayor of London
- John Beauchamp, 1st Baron Beauchamp of Warwick (d. 1360), Knight of the Order of the Garter
- Sir Paon de Roet (d. 1380), herald and knight for Edward III
- Sir Alan Buxhull (d. 1381), Knight of the Order of the Garter and Constable of the Tower of London
- John of Gaunt, Duke of Lancaster (d. 1399), and his first wife, Blanche of Lancaster (d. 1368)
- Sir Henry Barton (d. 1435), twice Lord Mayor of London
- Robert Morton (d. 1497), Bishop of Worcester
- Thomas Murfyn (d. 1523), Sheriff and Lord Mayor of London
- John Colet (d. 1519), Dean of St Paul's, Christian humanist and founder of St Paul's School
- Thomas Linacre (d. 1524), physician, founder of the Royal College of Physicians
- William Herbert, 1st Earl of Pembroke (d. 1570), courtier
- Sir Nicholas Bacon (d. 1579), Lord Keeper of the Great Seal
- Sir Philip Sidney (d. 1586), poet, courtier, scholar, and soldier
- Sir Francis Walsingham (d. 1590), spymaster for Elizabeth I
- Sir Christopher Hatton (d. 1591), Lord Chancellor of England
- Sir Thomas Heneage (d. 1595), politician and courtier
- Sir Thomas Baskerville (d. 1597), commanded the English Army at the Siege of Amiens (1597)
- Ursula St Barbe (d. 1602), lady at court, wife of Sir Francis Walsingham
- Robert Hare (d. 1611), antiquary and chancellor of the exchequer
- Sir William Dethick (d. 1612), officer at the College of Arms
- Sir William Cockayne (d. 1626), Lord Mayor of the City of London
- John Donne (d. 1631), poet and Dean of St Paul's
- John Howson (d. 1632), Bishop of Durham
- Sir Anthony van Dyck (d. 1641), painter
- Brian Walton (d. 1661), Bishop of Chester
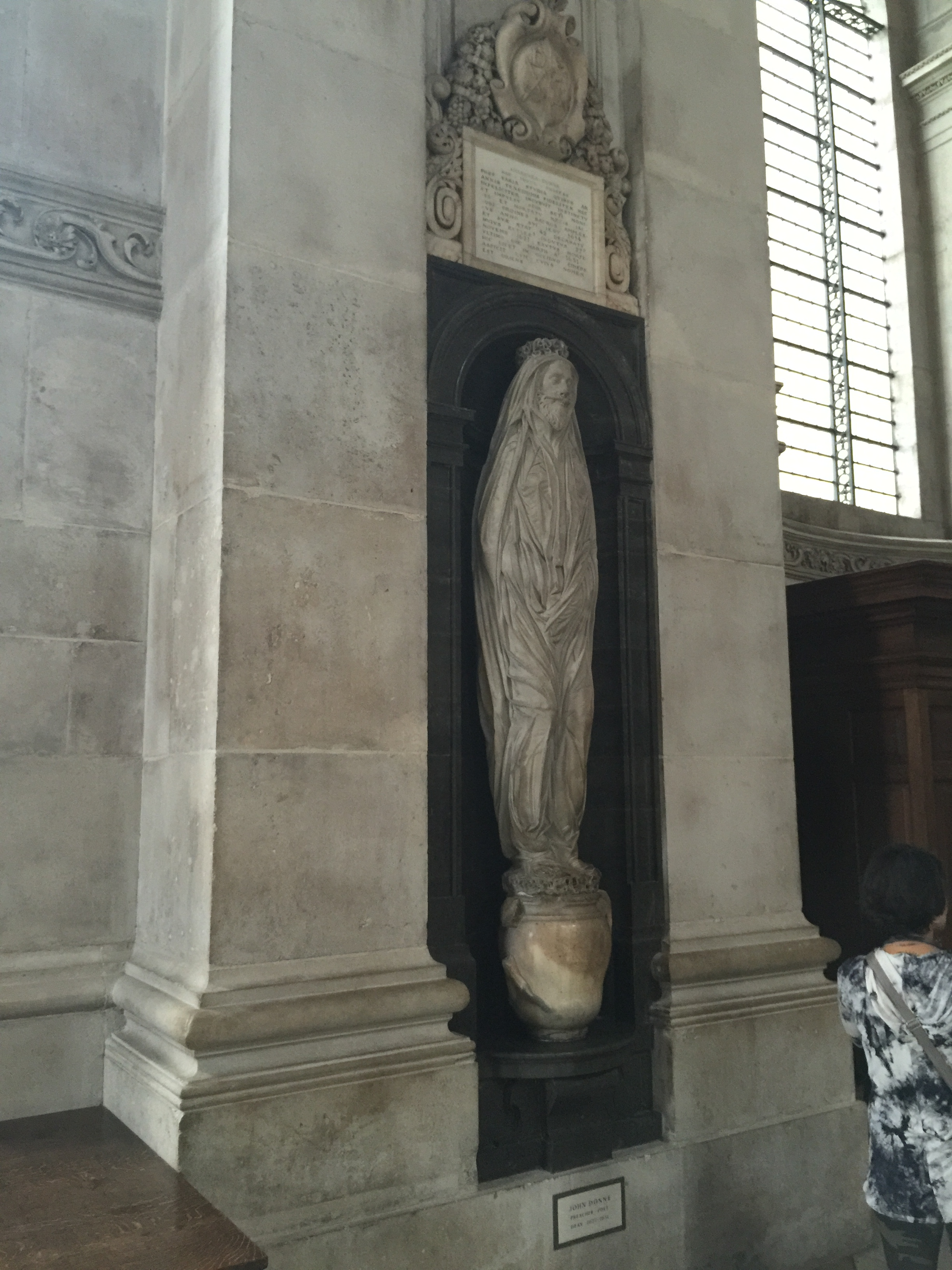
Memorial to John Donne, St Paul's Cathedral

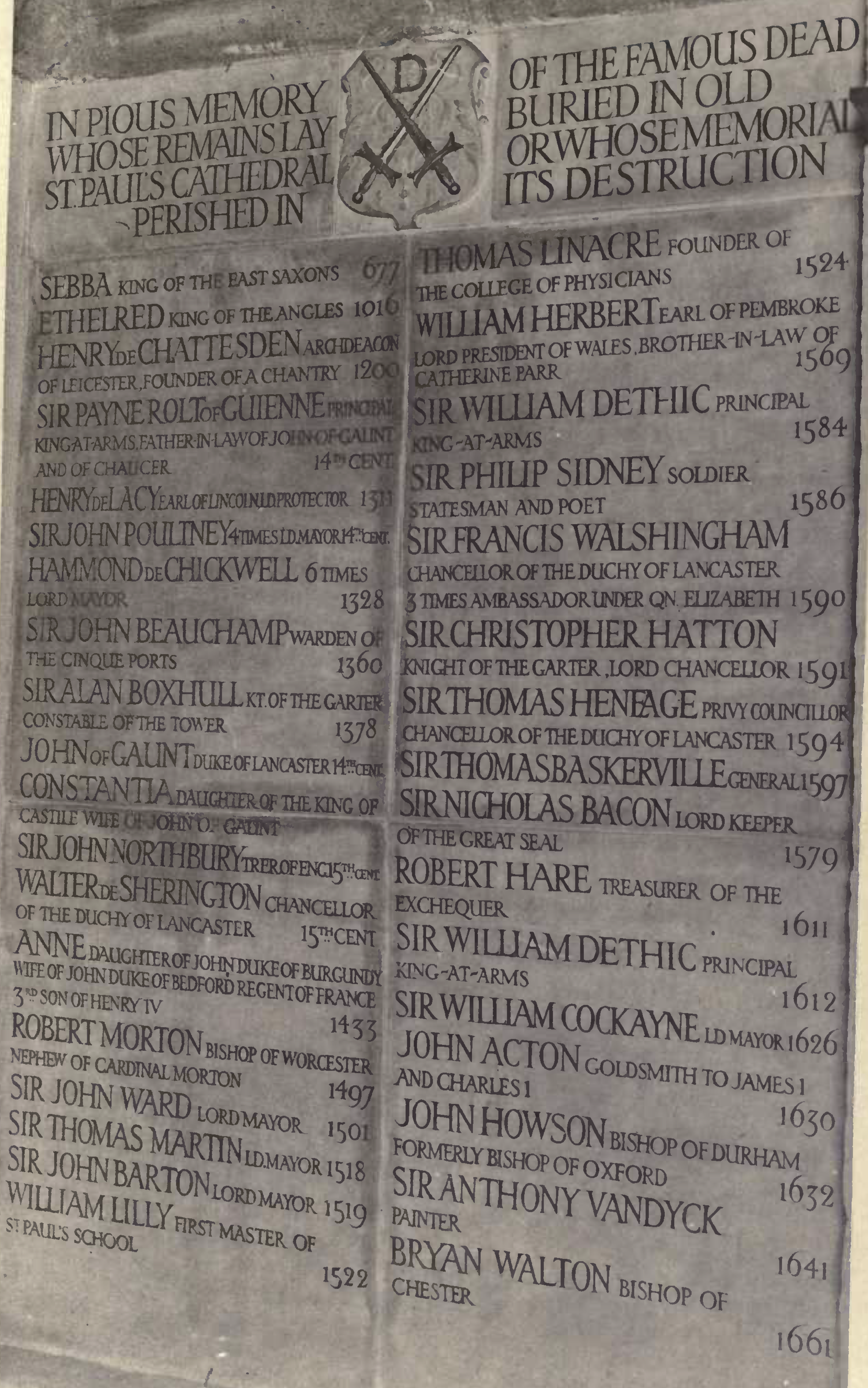
A memorial listing those buried or memorialised in the old cathedral

== See also ==
- Children of Paul's, associated theatre troupe
- List of demolished buildings and structures in London
- List of tallest structures built before the 20th century
- Montfichet's Tower, a Norman fortress on Ludgate Hill in London

== Notes ==
Records
Preceded by Yongning Pagoda (disputed)	World's tallest structure ever built 149 metres (489 ft); 1221–1311	Succeeded by Lincoln Cathedral
Preceded by Great Pyramid of Giza	World's tallest existing structure 1221–1311	Succeeded by Lincoln Cathedral
Preceded by Malmesbury Abbey Tower	World's tallest tower 1221–1311	Succeeded by Lincoln Cathedral
