= Anne of Denmark and the spa at Bath =

English royal progress in 1613

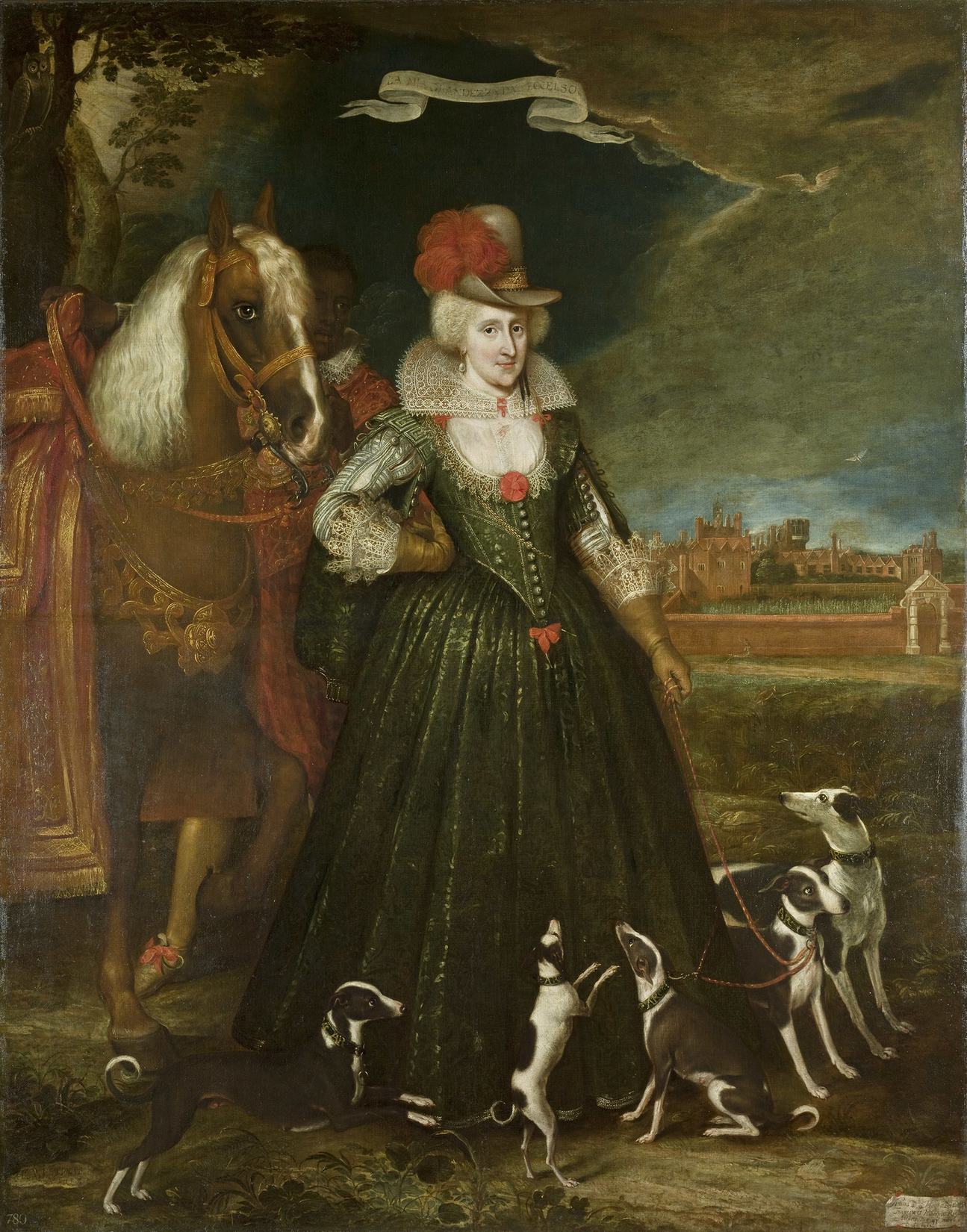
Anne of Denmark was advised to visit Bath by the court physician Théodore de Mayerne.

Anne of Denmark (1574–1619) was the wife of James VI and I. She visited Bath, Somerset, in the belief that drinking and bathing in mineral waters could improve her health. The warm springs at Bath had been used for medicinal purposes since Roman times. During her progresses to Bath she was entertained at country houses along the way. The court physician Théodore de Mayerne left extensive notes in Latin describing his treatment of Anne of Denmark from 10 April 1612 to her death. Primarily, she was seeking help for gout or dropsy, a swelling of the legs and feet which made walking difficult. Her companion and servant Jean Drummond described an occasion when the queen was unable to set her swollen foot on the ground. During these progresses, Anne of Denmark visited or came near some of the lands and manors included in her jointure lands, including Corston, and was able to promote the image of the Stuart monarchy.

== At Bath in 1613 ==
In April 1613, after the wedding of her daughter Princess Elizabeth, Anne of Denmark went to Bath to take the water. Mayerne recorded that the onset of her severe gout, podagra dolorem, had been around Christmas Day 1612. Her party included the Lord Chancellor and his wife Alice Spencer, Countess of Derby, Anne Clifford, Countess of Dorset, the Earl of Worcester, Lord Danvers, and Jane Drummond. She went to Windsor then to Reading. The ambassador of Savoy, the Marquess de Villa followed her bringing a gift of a crystal casket mounted with silver gilt, "reported to be of transcendent value" like all far-fetched rarities. He abandoned his journey, and waited in London for her return to present the gift.

=== Masque at Caversham ===
At Caversham Park on 27 April, William Knollys, 1st Earl of Banbury and Lady Knollys put on an entertainment written by Thomas Campion. A description of the entertainment was printed in 1613. The queen was met by a 'Cynic' dressed in calico as a wildman who debated with a 'Traveller' in elaborate costume. These two rode the short distance to the park gate and were met by two park keepers dressed in green perpetuana with Monmouth caps with two of Robin Hood's men dressed in green and black, who sang for the queen in her coach.

The entertainment continued in the hall of the house after supper. Eight pages in green satin introduced eight masque dancers (the four sons of the Earl of Suffolk, with the Earl of Dorset, Dudley Baron North, Henry Cary, and Henry Rich). Costumed in rich emboidered suits of green satin and high hats, their faces were disguised with vizards. Then they invited the ladies in waiting to dance, and finally Anne of Denmark agreed to make "herself head of their revels, and graciously to adorn the place with her personal dancing". When she left Caversham, the Gardener and his workmen and three country maids gave a speech and sang. The three maids presented gifts of linen, an apron, and a mantle which "were wrought by their hands", and John Chamberlain reported other gifts including a "dainty coverlet or quilt", a carcanet necklace and a "curious cabinet".

=== Bath in May ===
Théodore de Mayerne gave some medications to Anne of Denmark at Lacock Abbey in May 1613. Mayerne held a meeting about her health, attended by her chamberlain George Carew, at Badminton or a house in Bath belonging to the Earl of Worcester on 5 May. Mayerne built up the queen's water treatment over a number of days, before she bathed in King's Bath. Mayerne noted the warm and gently bubbling water.

While bathing, this year or in 1615, it was said that Anne of Denmark was surprised by a flame caused by natural gas in King's Bath, and thereafter used the New Bath or Queen's Bath where a column with a globe and crown and the inscription "Anna Regnum Sacrum" was added in her honour. A drawing dated 1672 and 1675 of the bath and the Hart Lodging in Bath, where she stayed, shows a related inscription "Annae Reginae Sacrum, 1618" across the parapet of the building, and the globe on top of the crowned column in the centre of the Queen's Bath. The drawing is held by the British Museum.

=== Pageant at Bristol ===
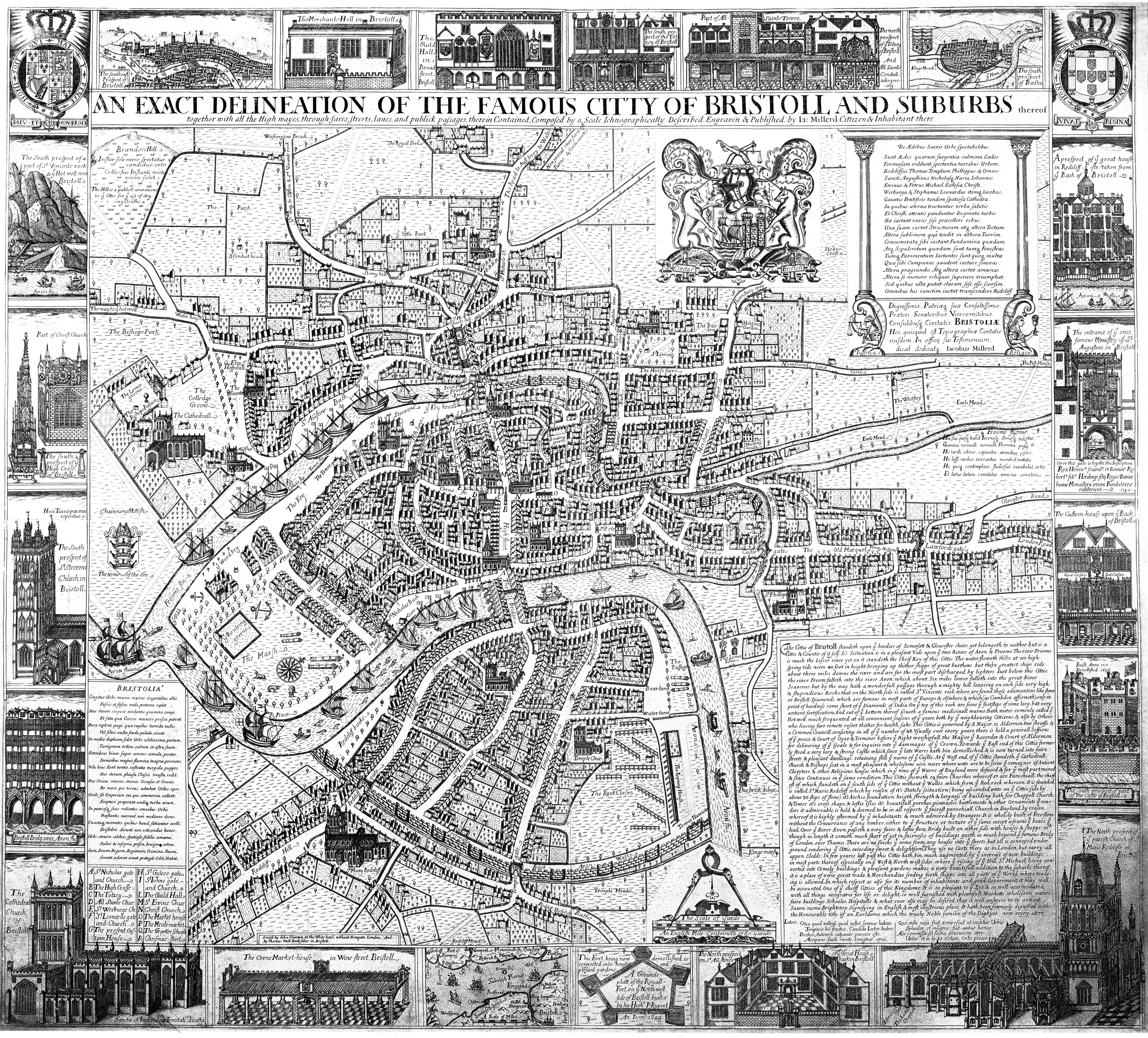
Anne of Denmark watched the pageant on the river at Bristol from Canon's Marsh, marked at the left side of the map

Anne of Denmark went to Bristol on 4 June where there were various entertainments. A seat was built for her at Canon's Marsh near the Cathedral, where she watched a staged battle at the confluence of the Avon and Frome, fought between an English ship and two Turkish galleys. An English victory was signalled by the release of six bladders of pig's blood poured out of the ship's scupper holes. Some Turkish prisoners were presented to her and she laughed at this, saying both the actors' red costumes and their "countenances" were like the Turks. The entertainment at Bristol was described in verse by Robert Naile, who mentions the Turks were played by sailors, "worthy brutes, who oft have seen their habit, form and guise", who were made to kneel before Anne of Denmark and beg for mercy as the final act of the pageant. A sea-battle against the Turks had been staged on the Thames at London in February for the wedding of Princess Elizabeth and Frederick V of the Palatinate. After the pageant at Bristol, the lady in waiting Jane Drummond had dinner with the Mayor, Abel Kitchin, and gave him a ring from the queen, set with diamonds.

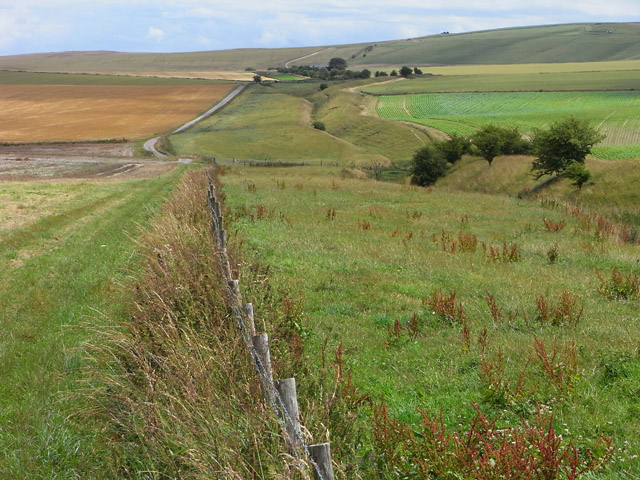
Anne of Denmark paused at the Wansdyke for a pastoral entertainment rustled up by a local vicar George Ferebee in search of patronage.

She stayed a night at Siston Court, the house of Sir Henry Billingsley. She was then either at Lacock Abbey or Corsham Court on her way to Bishops Cannings near Devizes. Corsham was one of the manors included in her jointure lands. The vicar of Bishops Cannings, George Ferebee, produced a pastoral entertainment for her on the downs at the Wansdyke on 11 June.

She returned to Greenwich Palace, where Mayerne gave her a "dry" or steam bath, recommended for dry skin, and moved to Somerset House by 8 July. Around 12 July, as mentioned in John Chamberlain's letter of 1 August, she was at Theobalds and accidentally shot the king's "most principal and special hound" with a crossbow. On 27 July King James was at Lydiard Park, where he fell down the stairs, and also signed a warrant for £200 for Anne's usher John Tonstall for the expenses of another trip to Bath.

=== Wells and Bath in August ===
Anne came back to Bath in August 1613. The two trips are mentioned in the accounts of her goldsmith George Heriot, who billed her "for jewelles retained unto her Maj[esty's] own handis, to be carried on her first and second journeys to the Bathe, viz., in April 1613 and August following".

She went to Wells, Somerset, travelling from Oatland to Elvetham, Basing, Hurstbourne, Wallop, and Salisbury. She visited Edward Rodney at Rodney Stoke, who subsequently married Frances Southwell, a lady in waiting, in May 1614.

The Mayor of Wells gave orders to tidy up the streets and the water conduit was to be painted, "colored and layde and with oyle". Anne was entertained at Wells on 20 August 1613 by a pageant performed by the town's trades and crafts. Anne's usher and valet of the chamber, Henry Colbourne, contributed by building stands to seat the royal party. The blacksmiths presented Vulcan's forge. The butchers made a tableau of "old virgins", with their attires made of cow tails and necklaces made of cow's horns, who were drawn in a chariot by men and boys dressed in ox skins. The mayor, William Bull, held a dinner for members of the queen's household including her four maids of honour; Mary Gargrave, Elizabeth Harcourt, Mary Middlemore, and Elizabeth Roper.

Mayerne wrote to King James on 31 August that she was in the best of spirits. He wrote in French, "Ce jourd huy S. M. est entrée dans le baing, qu'elle est très bien porté, et au sortir. C'est trouvé en toute telle disposition que nous erisons sien souhaitter", that is, "today Her Serene Majesty entered the bath as usual, all things are as well as could be wished for". Mayerne thought the queen's good attitude would help her cure.

King James was also on progress, at Beaulieu in Hampshire. Stands were built there for the royal party to watch football and animal baiting. James gave an audience to the Venetian ambassador Antonio Foscarini at Beaulieu. Foscarini reported Anne's delight at the entertainment in Wells and her interaction with local people who filled the streets. In September, musicians played for her departure from Bath.

== At Bath in 1615 ==
From September 1614 Anne was troubled by pain in her feet, as described in the letters of her chamberlain Viscount Lisle and the countesses of Bedford and Roxburghe. Lisle noted "the Queen hath been a little lame" as early as October 1611. She was ill in March 1615, suspected to have dropsy, and given a course of physic. Plans for a trip to Bath were deferred, at King James' suggestion, possibly because of a lack of funds.

She left Denmark House for Salisbury and Bath at the end of July 1615, after uncertainty at court if she would make the journey. There were petitions against the royal progresses to the west this year, because the hard winter and exceptionally hot and dry summer had adversely affected crops and livestock.

There was music at Colnbrook, not far from Windsor, and a stop was made at the Bear Inn at Reading on 26 July, then on to Newbury where there was music, and she stayed at Shaw House the home of Thomas Dolman. At Salisbury she stayed a week, listening to the singing of the town waits, and the musicians of the Earl of Southampton and Lord Fenton. At Warminster, she was entertained by a blind man playing the virginals, and there was music at another house on 11 August, possibly Longleat.

Her lodging in Bath was Dr Stewarde's house, and Mr. Hadnethe's house near the springs was rented as the queen's lodging for bathing. Viscount Lisle's daughter Kate Mansel came from Margam to join the royal party at Bath, partly on account of ill-health. On 23 August there was morris dancing and the Earl of Worcester's musicians played. A blind man in Bath played the organ for the queen.

The queen was expected to return via Chippenham to Oatlands by 2 September. She stayed at Bath longer than anticipated due to an attack of gout. Lisle sent his wife Barbara four red deer pasties and a salmon pie, treats from the court kitchen. She was at Marlborough on 6 September, and heard the town's musicians.

On the return journey, she went to Mr. Flower's house at Norton St Philip, and at Warminster the blind man played the virginals again. By 20 September, Anne of Denmark was at Greenwich Palace and had commenced taking physic medicine. Lisle had to attend the queen during her medication and could not get away to visit his wife at Penshurst Place. John Chamberlain wrote that the Queen, "is returned from Bath, not so well as when she went".

Anne of Denmark's stay in Bath in the summer of 1615 was reckoned as two visits, and her servant and usher John Tunstall was later paid £105-10s-9d for fitting up her lodging in Bath and expenses of her journeys.
