= Maid of honour =

Junior attendants of a queen in royal households

A maid of honour is a junior attendant to a queen in royal households, ranking below a lady-in-waiting. The equivalent title and office has historically been used in most European royal courts.

== Tudors and Stuarts ==
Traditionally, a queen regnant had eight maids of honour, while a queen consort had four. Queen Anne Boleyn had seven maids of honour and one mother of maids.

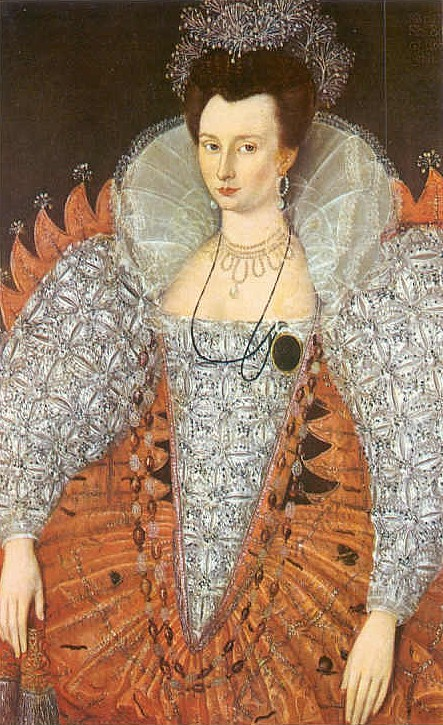
Mary Fitton, 1595, a maid of honour to Elizabeth I

A maid of honour was a maiden, meaning that she had never been married (and therefore was ostensibly a virgin), and was usually young and a member of the nobility. Maids of honour were commonly in their sixteenth year or older, although Lady Jane Grey served as a maid of honour to Queen Catherine Parr in about 1546–1548, when Jane was only about ten to twelve years old.

Under Mary I and Elizabeth I, maids of honour were at court as a kind of finishing school, with the hope of making a good marriage. Elizabeth Knollys became a maid of honour at court at the age of nine. Elizabeth gave gifts of clothing to her maids of honour, including the sisters Elizabeth and Anne Knollys, Margaret, Philadelphia, and Catherine Carey, and Frances and Elizabeth Howard.

Elizabeth I's maids of honour danced in a masque in June 1600 at the marriage of Anne Russell and Henry Somerset, and Mary Fitton had a speaking part. This is an early record of female theatrical performance in this context. The other masque dancers were "Lady Dougherty" (Dorothy Hastings), Mistress Carey, Mistress Onslow, Mistress Southwell, Bess Russell, Mistress Darcy, and Blanche Somerset. The queen herself joined the dance.

An ordinance for the English household of Anne of Denmark made on 20 July 1603 allowed for six maids and a supervisory mother of maids, with four chamberers. The Earl of Worcester discussed the appointments in a 1604 letter: "for the presence [chamber] there ar nowe 5 maydes, Cary, Myddellmore, Woodhowse, Gargrave, Roper, the sixt is determyned but not come". In 1632, six maids of honour at the court of Henrietta Maria took part in the masque The Shepherd's Paradise.

The maids of honour did not always receive a fee or salary beyond their board and lodging. Some maids received £10 yearly in the 17th century. There were also grants and rewards, including property leases which provided an income known as "annual rent". In 1630, Cecilia Crofts gained pensions and an income from duty on coal mines near Benwell. Some of the maids received dowries from the monarch.

== Twentienth century ==
In the 19th and 20th centuries, the term maid of honour in waiting was sometimes used. The queen mother often also had maids of honour. In 1912, for example, Ivy Gordon-Lennox was appointed a maid of honour to Queen Alexandra.

In 1912, King George V granted maids of honour the style of The Honourable, with precedence next after daughters of barons.

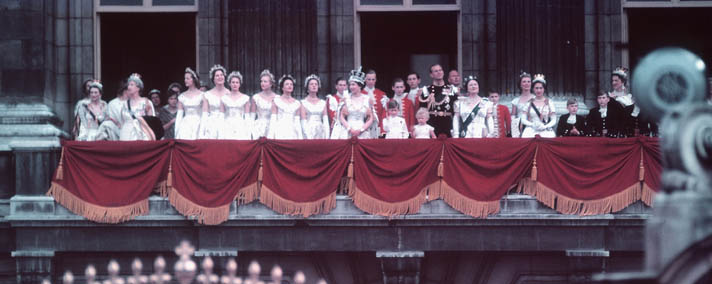
The six maids of honour of Queen Elizabeth II appear with her on the balcony of Buckingham Palace after her coronation.

At her coronation, Queen Elizabeth II had six maids of honour who attended her throughout the ceremony, especially carrying the trains of her robes. They were:

- Lady Moyra Hamilton, daughter of James Hamilton, Marquess of Hamilton;
- Lady Anne Coke, daughter of Thomas Coke, 5th Earl of Leicester;
- Lady Jane Vane-Tempest-Stewart, daughter of Robin Vane-Tempest-Stewart, 8th Marquess of Londonderry;
- Lady Mary Baillie-Hamilton, daughter of George Baillie-Hamilton, 12th Earl of Haddington;
- Lady Jane Heathcote-Drummond-Willoughby, daughter of James Heathcote-Drummond-Willoughby, 3rd Earl of Ancaster; and
- Lady Rosemary Spencer-Churchill, daughter of John Spencer-Churchill, 10th Duke of Marlborough.

== Terminology ==
A lady-in-waiting is a woman who attends a female member of the Royal Family other than the queen regnant or queen consort. An attendant upon one of the latter is a Lady of the Bedchamber or Woman of the Bedchamber, and the senior lady-in-waiting is the Mistress of the Robes. The women of the bedchamber are in regular attendance, but the mistress of the robes and the ladies of the bedchamber are normally only required for ceremonial occasions.

At the Tudor and Stuart courts, the women in attendance included gentlewomen, maids of honour, and chamberers. The gentlewoman in charge of the maids of honour was known as the Mother of the Maids.

The term maid of honour is the origin of the American English term maid of honor, usually the best friend of a bride who leads her bridal party.
