= Elizabeth Hutton =

English courtier

Elizabeth, Mistress Hutton (fl. 1558), was an English courtier. She served in the Household of queen Katherine of Aragon and Mary I.

Elizabeth was the daughter and coheiress of Sir Robert Bellingham of Burnehead Hall, Burneside, Westmoreland by his wife Anne Pickering. She was the childhood friend of Katherine Parr.

In around 1529 and certainly by 1540 she married Cuthbert Hutton, the son of Hugh Hutton of Hutton John. The Huttons had the son John, and at least three daughters, Katherine, Anne, and Mary. Through her daughter Mary she was the grandmother of Richard Huddleston.

She came to court when Katherine of Aragon married Henry VIII in 1509, to be one of her waiting gentlewomen. According to Alison Weir she was Katherine's Mother of the Maids. One very garbled account in a book published in 1882 completely mixes up the generations, but it appears that Elizabeth's youngest daughter, Mary, was born at court and her godmother was Princess Mary, Katherine Parr's stepdaughter. Elizabeth Hutton was definitely Mother of the Maids in the household of the selfsame, now Mary I, in July 1558:

July 13, 1558. St. James's.— The Queen to the President in the North. A suit is pending before him between her well-beloved gentlewoman Elizabeth Hutton, mother of her maids, and one Richard Dudley, concerning a mill-dam on the water of Eamont, in the county of Cumberland. Inasmuch as the said Elizabeth is employed at St. James's, and cannot attend in the north, the Queen desires that the suit may be sent for trial at Whitehall.

Mary I had been weak and ill from May 1558, which would last until her death on 17 November 1558.

The youngest brother of Richard Dudley, with whom Elizabeth had a legal dispute, Edmund Dudley, was married to the Huttons daughter Katherine. Edmund Dudley and Katherine Hutton had the sons Richard Dudley, a Catholic priest and noted a Catholic agent and Jesuit, and John Dudley, who would inherit Yanwath Hall from his uncle.

When Elizabeth left court, she returned to Hutton John, where she and her husband laid out gardens in the style of those at Hampton Court.

Cuthbert Hutton served in the Scottish war under Edward VI. He was killed, and left as his heir his son John. His widow Elizabeth acquired the wardship.
