= Dorothy Hastings =

English courtier to Elizabeth I

Dorothy Hastings (1579 – after 1613) was a courtier to Elizabeth I of England and Anne of Denmark

Dorothy Hastings was born in 1579, the daughter of George Hastings, 4th Earl of Huntingdon and Dorothy Port, daughter and co-heiress of Sir John Port of Etwall and Elizabeth Giffard.

== Maid of Honour and masques at court ==
Dorothy Hastings was a Maid of Honour to Queen Elizabeth. She was probably the Lady Dorothy or "Lady Dougherty" who danced in the masque at the marriage of Anne Russell and Lord Herbert in June 1600. The other dancers, led by Mary Fitton, were Mistress Onslow, Mistress Carey, Elizabeth Southwell, Bess Russell, Mistress Darcy, and Blanche Somerset. They wore skirts of cloth of silver, waiscoats embroidered with coloured silks and silver and gold thread, mantles of carnation taffeta, and "loose hair about their shoulders" which was also "curiously knotted and interlaced".

At the Harefield Entertainment in 1602, Dorothy Hastings was given a bodkin, a jewelled hair-pin, with the lines, "Even with this bodkin you may live unharmed: Your beauty with your virtues so well armed". Around this time Sir John Holles tried without success to arrange a marriage for her with Robert Bertie, Lord Willoughby. Willoughby, who was in Siena, was clearly surprised by Holles's approach, and thought he was misinformed about his acquaintance with Dorothy, who he only knew at court where it was usual "to spend some hours with the ladies" and they had no "extraordinary liking". Holles was acting at the insistence of Dorothy's mother, who urged him to try again six months later when Willoughby returned to London. In 1605 there was a rumour that Willoughby would marry the queen's Maid of Honour, Mary Gargrave, but he married Elizabeth Montagu instead.

She, (or the wife of her brother Francis Hastings, Lord Hastings, Sarah Harington, also known as Lady Hastings), travelled to Scotland in 1603 in the hope of finding favour with Anne of Denmark. Her party met the queen ahead of an official group sent to welcome the queen at Berwick upon Tweed. Hastings's party consisted of members of the Harington family, including Anne, Lady Harington, her daughter Lucy Russell, Countess of Bedford, Theodosia Noel, Lady Cecil, with Elizabeth Cecil, Lady Hatton.

She seems to have travelled with the court to the west country and Winchester to avoid the plague in September 1603, and may have danced in the queen's masque, Prince Henry's Welcome at Winchester. Before the court returned to London, according to Arbella Stuart, the Spanish ambassador, the Count of Villamediana, organised a dinner for Anne de Rabot, the wife of the French ambassador, Christophe de Harlay, Count of Beaumont. Anne de Rabot was asked to invite some English ladies. She brought the Countess of Bedford, Lady Penelope Rich, Lady Susan de Vere, and "Lady Dorothy".

Dorothy was Ceres in The Vision of the Twelve Goddesses a masque by Samuel Daniel performed in the Great Hall of Hampton Court Palace on 8 January 1604. She danced in the masque Hymenaei, written by Ben Jonson for the marriage of Robert Devereux, 3rd Earl of Essex, and Lady Frances Howard, daughter of the Earl of Suffolk, performed on their wedding day, 5 January 1606.

Her clothes were stolen from her chamber at Whitehall Palace in March 1605. Henry Goodere was robbed at the same time. Dorothy Hastings described herself as a servant of Anne of Denmark, but it is unclear if she was a paid member of the household. A "Lady Dorothie" appears in a list of fees and pensions made in 1606, receiving £50 annually.

== James Stewart ==
Hastings married James Stewart, a Scottish servant in the king's household and a son of Walter Stewart, 1st Lord Blantyre. He died in a duel at Islington on 8 November 1609, fought with Sir George Wharton, who also died. A ballad was printed A lamentable ballat of a Combate lately fought near London between Sir James Stewart and Sir George Wharton, Knights who were both slaine at that time. King James paid for their burial at Islington.

The dispute had started over a game of cards in the Earl of Essex's chamber in Whitehall, A newsletter described Stewart as "a great minion of the king". John Dunbar wrote a Neo-Latin epigram, about the tragedy stressing their equality, published in his Epigrammaton Ioannis Dunbari Megalo-Britanni (London, 1616), IV. 54.

The Venetian ambassador Marc' Antonio Correr wrote that King James moved out of London in response to the duel, to avoid any bad feeling against his Scottish courtiers. He identified Wharton as a brother of the sister-in-law of Henry Wotton, the English ambassador in Venice. (Margaret Wharton was the wife of Edward Wotton, 1st Baron Wotton).

== Begging letters ==
Sir John Holles, who had become Comptroller of the Household of Prince Henry, recorded in his letter book attempts to secure royal favour and money for Dorothy, and he helped her draft letters to the king, queen, and prince. One letter accompanied an emblem (or emblematic jewel) that Anne of Denmark might wear, of an Indian herb that grows although severed from the earth, her mother's milk, so representing her and Stewart's devoted service. In another, Dorothy presumed "in this my cloudy dark misfortune to creep to the warmth of your sacred beams", to the extent that the queen would urge the king to pay Stewart's debts. Her third letter to the queen for money concluded, "I am most loth to be tedious to your majesty, words being a disease which usually accompanies misery". A letter to the king acknowledged a recent gift, and her presumption in begging for the queen's intercession as mediator, asking only for an annuity and £1,300 to clear Stewart's debts which otherwise may traduce the honour of Scotland and his friends. She asked Prince Henry for a place for her husband's servant John Semery.

In July 1613 Dorothy Hastings alias Stewart married Robert Dillon, later 2nd Earl of Roscommon, at St Andrew, Holborn. They had a son, Henry Dillon.

== Antonio Foscarini ==
The Venetian ambassador Antonio Foscarini was accused of various faults committed during his time in England. He was said to have behaved with indecency towards two noble ladies. "Isabella Fosch" was one of the women, but witnesses were less clear on identity of the other, either a daughter of Lewis Lewknor or, identified by his interpreter, Dorothy Hastings. The accusation may refer to conversation regarded as indecent or indelicate. "Isabella Fosch" may have been Elizabeth Fowkes, the mother of the queen's maid of honour Mary Middlemore.
