= Elizabeth Harcourt =

English courtier to Anne of Denmark (fl. c. 1590–1610)

Elizabeth Harcourt (fl. c. 1590–1610), was an Englishwoman who was a courtier to Anne of Denmark.

She was a daughter of Sir Walter Harcourt of Stanton Harcourt and Ellenhall, and Dorothy Robinson, who was Harcourt's step-sister and daughter of William Robinson of Drayton Bassett.

Elizabeth Harcourt was appointed a Maid of Honour to the queen in 1607, her companions appointed in 1604 were Anne Carey, Mary Gargrave (b. 1576), Mary Middlemore, Elizabeth Roper, and Mary Woodhouse. These positions were established by a household ordinance of 20 July 1603, with places for six maids of honour and four chamberers. Rowland Whyte the maids of honour and others dancing at Hampton Court in the presence chamber of Anne of Denmark in October 1607, with a French visitor, the Count of Vaudémont.

On 20 August 1613 Anne of Denmark was received at Wells, Somerset. The mayor William Bull hosted a dinner for members of her household including the four maids of honour.

She was the sister of Sir Robert Harcourt of Staunton Harcourt (1574 - 20 May 1631) author of A Relation of Voyage to Guiana (1613), and of Vere Harcourt DD Archdeacon of Nottingham. Her nephew Sir Simon Harcourt was a soldier with Horace Vere, fought in Scotland, and was shot in Ireland on 26 March 1642, while besieging the castle of Carrickmaine or Kilgobbin near Dublin and was taken to House of Mirian where he died. Those remaining in the castle were massacred.

A sister Grace died young. Another sister, also called Elizabeth, is said to have married Sir William Essex of Lambourn, but his wife was Elizabeth Rogers of Beckett Hall.

Elizabeth Harcourt died unmarried. The family portraits were at Nuneham Courtenay and the family papers are held by the Bodleian Library.
