= Elizabeth Roper =

English courtier (died 1658)

Elizabeth Roper (d. 1658) was a member of the household of Anne of Denmark. She married Robert Mansell, a glass-making entrepreneur and became involved in his business. She was noted for her business activities as a "capitalist" by the historian Alice Clark.

Also called Anne Roper in some sources, and after her marriage, Elizabeth Mansell or Lady Mansell.

== Career ==
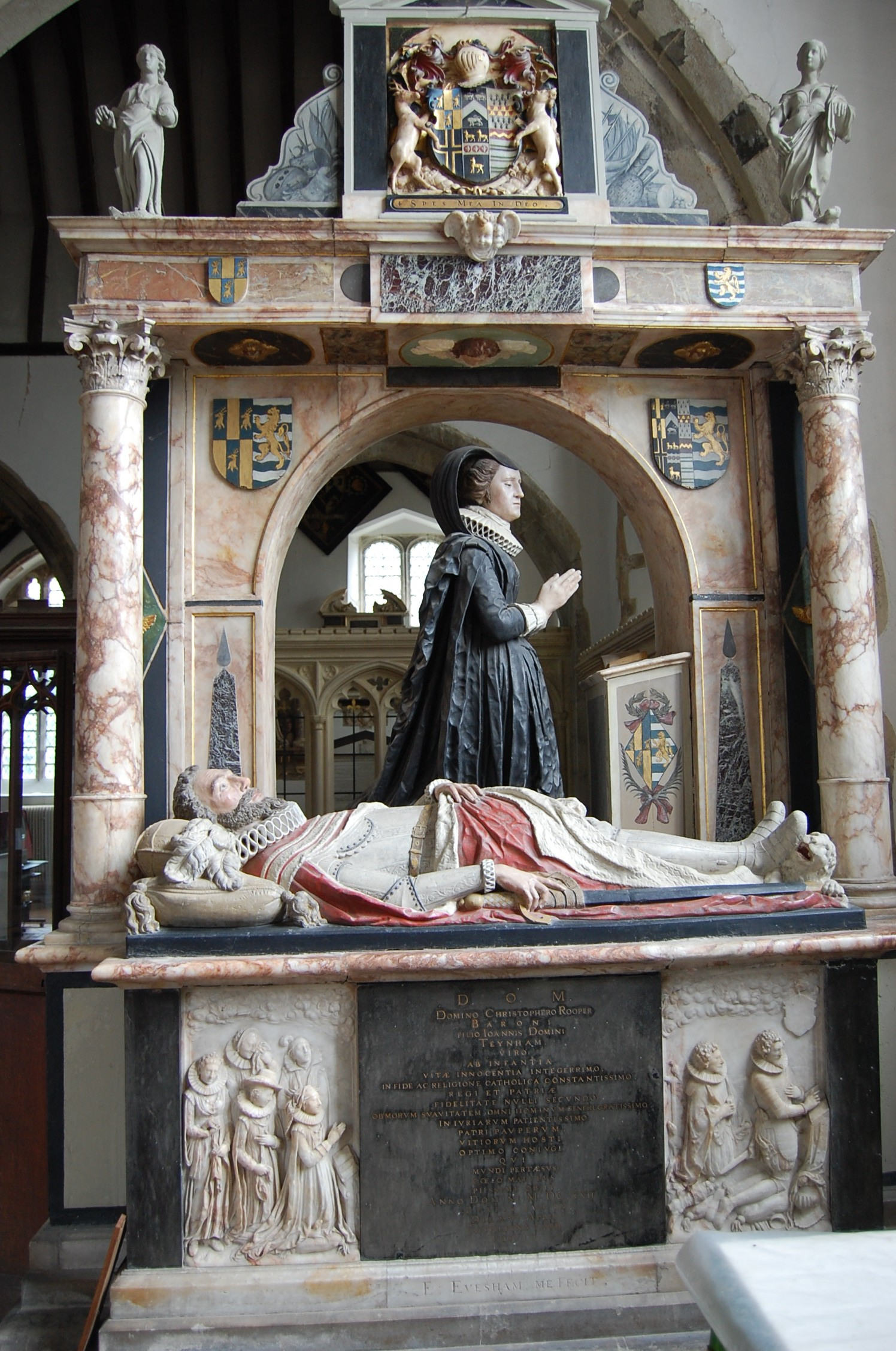
Elizabeth Roper may be depicted with her sisters on the Teynham monument by Epiphanius Evesham at Lynsted

She was probably a daughter of Christopher Roper, 2nd Baron Teynham (died 1622), and Catherine Seborne, of Lynsted Lodge, Lynsted, (or a daughter of John Roper, 1st Baron Teynham (died 1618) and Elizabeth Parke). John Roper was the first man of note in Kent to proclaim James VI and I King after the death of Elizabeth I in 1603, an event known as the Union of the Crowns. The monument to Christopher Roper and his wife at Lynsted Church was made by the sculptor Epiphanius Evesham.

An ordinance for establishing the English household of Anne of Denmark made on 20 July 1603 allowed for six maids of honour and a supervisory mother of maids, with four chamberers.

Elizabeth Roper was appointed a Maid of Honour to the queen in 1604, her companions were Anne Carey, Mary Gargrave (b. 1576), Mary Middlemore, Elizabeth Harcourt, and Mary Woodhouse. A letter of the Earl of Worcester describing the queen's household in 1604 mentions that "Roper, the sixth [maid of honour] is determined but not [yet] come". These positions at court were established by a household ordinance of 20 July 1603, with places for six maids of honour, a mother of the maids (Katherine Bridges), and four chamberers.

Rowland Whyte mentioned the maids of honour and others dancing at Hampton Court in the presence chamber of Anne of Denmark, with a French visitor, the Count of Vaudémont. "Mrs Roper" was given mourning clothes on the death of Prince Henry in 1612. On 20 August 1613 Anne of Denmark was received at Wells, Somerset during a progress to Bath. The mayor William Bull hosted a dinner for members of her household including the four maids of honour.

Elizabeth Roper married Sir Robert Mansell in March 1617 with a feast at Denmark House paid for by the queen. John Chamberlain wrote Mansell had married "his old mistress Roper, one of the Queen's ancient maids of honour". Edward Sherburn noted that the king gave Mansell £10,000 when he married Mrs Roper. She was usually known as "Lady Mansell". They had no children.

James Howell noted in 1621 that Mansell's marriage to Roper had made him a kinsman to Sir Henry Wotton, the English ambassador in Venice. Mansell had been Treasurer of the Navy since 1604, appointed by Earl of Nottingham, in the place of Fulke Greville. The Earl was married to Elizabeth Stewart, a Scottish former lady in waiting of Anne of Denmark.

Mansell had become involved in glass-making in 1611, and in 1618 bought out the interests of Sir Edward Zouch of Woking who was married to Roper's old colleague in the queen's household, Dorothea Silking. Mansell's interests included a glass-house in Scotland. Elizabeth Mansell made business decisions, especially when Mansell was on business abroad. In response to a report on the quality of their glass by Inigo Jones, Lady Mansell switched from using Scottish coal in their London glass-houses to Newcastle coal. She complained to the Privy Council that a rival patent-holder, Sir William Clavell of Smedmore, had enticed some of their expert workmen to leave their glasshouses and go to work in Scotland. She thwarted such attempts to damage the business while her husband was abroad or at sea.

At the funeral of Anne of Denmark, "Lady Maunsell" walked in procession with the ladies of the Privy Chamber.

In 1621 Elizabeth Mansell petitioned King James against other glass-makers encroaching on their patent, and claimed they tried to take advantage, thinking her "a weak woman unable to follow the business". In 1623 three glass-making artificiers petitioned the Privy Council that she should reverse a pay-cut that meant that they could not support their families.

She died in 1658 and was buried at St Alfege Church, Greenwich, on 19 November 1658.
