= Mary Gargrave =

Courtier to the Anne of Denmark (1576-1640)

Mary Gargrave (1576 – c. 1640) was a courtier to Anne of Denmark.

== Career ==
Gargrave was appointed a maid of honour to the queen in 1603 or 1604 in time for her coronation. These positions at court were established by a household ordinance of 20 July 1603, with places for six maids of honour, a mother of the maids (Katherine Bridges), and four chamberers. Her companions were Anne Carey, Elizabeth Roper, Mary Middlemore, Elizabeth Harcourt, and Mary Woodhouse. At the Queen's death in 1619 she was reckoned to have given 16 years service.

In 1605, her cousin, Philip Gawdy, heard she might marry Robert Bertie, Lord Willoughby, but he married Elizabeth Montagu.

Rowland Whyte mentioned the maids of honour and others dancing at Hampton Court in the presence chamber of Anne of Denmark, with a French visitor, the Count of Vaudémont. Gargrave was of sufficient status to give the queen New Year's Day gifts, and in 1608/9 gave her a rich and expensive petticoat embroidered with Venice gold, silver, and coloured silks. Anne of Denmark asked Gargrave to buy fans to send to Elizabeth at Heidelberg.

Gargrave was given mourning clothes on the death of Prince Henry in 1612. On 20 August 1613 Anne of Denmark was on her progress to Bath. was received at Wells, Somerset. The mayor William Bull hosted a dinner for members of her household including the four maids of honour.

John Finet described the reception of Isabelle Brûlart, the wife of French ambassador Gaspard Dauvet, Sieur des Marets, at Denmark House in December 1617. She arrived by coach at the old portico built by Protector Somerset on the Strand, rather than by boat on the Thames. He brought her and her servants to a chamber in the first court. Lady Blanche Arundell, Mistress Barbara Sidney (daughter of the Viscountess Lisle), Mistress Southwell of the queen's privy chamber, and Gargrave joined her. A gentleman usher then took Brûlart to the queen in the Privy Chamber.

Richard Gargrave, a graduate of Peterhouse, Cambridge, sold Nostell Priory in 1613 and was in financial difficulties. After Anne of Denmark died in 1619 there was "much talk" in London about provision for her servants, Gargrave was to have a pension of £200, a lump sum of £1000, and a protection against lawsuits. Gargrave never married and was dependent on a pension from her service with the queen, which was not always paid.

== Anne Gargrave and the Bushell family ==
Mary Gargrave was a daughter of Sir Cotton Gargrave (1540–1588) and his second wife Anne Waterton. They had houses at Kinsley, Hemsworth, and Nostell Priory, near Wakefield. King James knighted her brother Richard Gargrave at York on 17 April 1603. Although King James and later Anne of Denmark passed close to her home on their way to London from Scotland, there is no record of Gargrave meeting them at that time.

Her sister Anne (d. 1634) married Thomas Venables, and secondly, a recusant and royal equerry Sir Edward Bushell. Bushell was a cousin of the gunpowder plotters Robert and Thomas Wintour, and wrote to Robert Cecil to declare his innocence. Another cousin, Corbett Bushell was a member of the household of Elizabeth Stuart, Queen of Bohemia. Corbett Bushell was seriously injured in a fight with Andrew Keith in 1613 at Heidelberg.
