= Placemen =

Civil officeholders in British Parliament

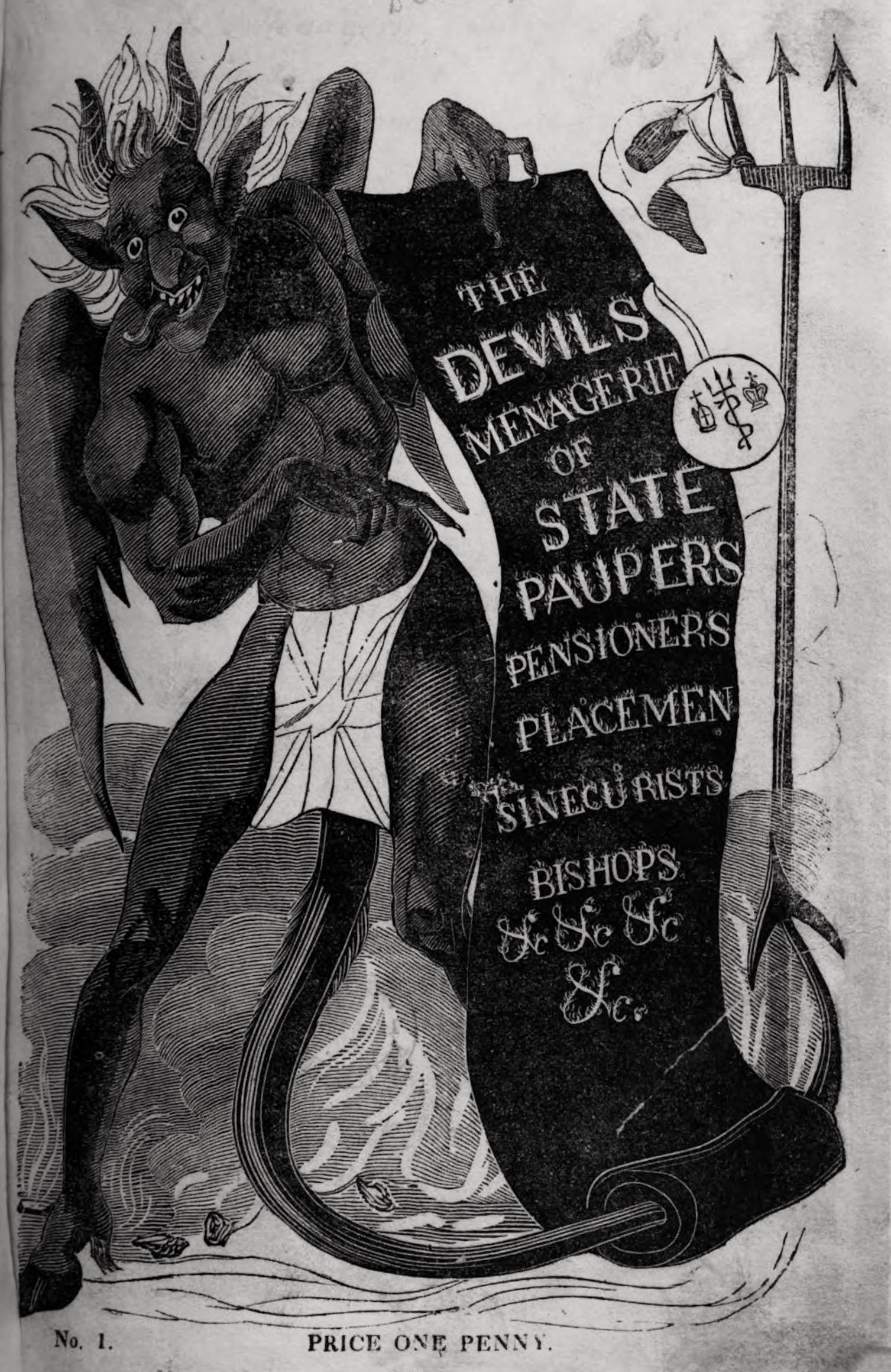
Cover of an 1832 list of placemen. Collection of the British Library.

In the political history of Britain, placemen were Members of Parliament who held paid office in the civil service, generally sinecures, simultaneously with their seat in the legislature.

== William and Mary ==
Placemen exerted substantial influence over legislation during the reign of William III and Mary II, who jointly acceded to the throne following the Glorious Revolution of 1688–89. Estimates of the number of placemen in Parliament during the 1690s vary, but the consensus among contemporary chroniclers converges around 100 or so (with a few outliers among government critics such as Samuel Grascome, who put the number far higher).

As of 1690, William's court adopted an explicit policy directing placemen—who, at that time, included customs officers as well as others with 'Pentions' or 'other Advantages' provided by royal largesse—to advance the Crown's interest in Parliament, particularly as regards voting supply. Rubini notes that this is not surprising, as placemen 'received some of what they voted as their reward'.

A 1692 bill, which failed to pass, would have shortened the length of parliaments and banned officeholders from serving in Parliament. John Granville, apparently recalling the Self-denying Ordinance of 1645, called it a 'self-denying bill' in debate.

An anonymous pamphleteer writing in 1698 about the selection of a speaker expresses exasperation with the 'well paid Forces' of the Crown as compared to the 'undisciplin'd Militia' of the country party:

'Tis true, the ablest General alone, and without Troops, is insignificant: But when regulated and well paid Forces have a bold and skilful Leader at their Head, they must conquer; especially if those they encounter be an undisciplin'd Militia just brought out of their several Counties.

In many cases, placemen under William III exercised their control over Parliament simply by showing up: attendance at legislative sessions during William's reign was generally low, so a bloc determined to vote could pass its favoured measures by default.

A provision included in a draft version of the Act of Settlement 1701 would have banned all placemen from serving in Parliament, but the language was ultimately omitted.

== Sources ==
- Rubini, Dennis (1968). Court and Country 1688–1702. London: Hart-Davis. ISBN 9780246644770. OCLC 1148594363.
