= Mary Middlemore =

English courtier and maid of honour (died 1618)

Mary Middlemore (died 1618) was a Courtier and Maid of Honour to Anne of Denmark, subject of poems, and treasure hunter.

== Family background ==
Mary Middlemore was the eldest daughter of Henry Middlemore of Enfield, a groom of the privy chamber to Queen Elizabeth, and Elizabeth Fowkes from Somerset. Henry Middlemore had been sent as a messenger in 1568 to Mary, Queen of Scots at Carlisle Castle and to her half-brother Regent Moray in Scotland.

Mary's brother Robert Middlemore (d. 1629) was an equerry to King James. A monument to Robert and his wife Dorothy Fulstow or Fulstone (d. 1610) can be seen at St Andrews, Church, Enfield.

== Career ==
After her father died, her mother Elizabeth married Sir Vincent Skinner (d. 1616) an ambitious MP. An ordinance for establishing the English household of Anne of Denmark made on 20 July 1603 allowed for six maids of honour and a supervisory mother of maids, with four chamberers.

Middlemore was appointed a Maid of Honour to the queen in December 1603. Her companions were Anne Carey, Mary Gargrave, Elizabeth Roper, Elizabeth Harcourt, and Mary Woodhouse.

Rowland Whyte mentioned the maids of honour and others dancing at Hampton Court in the presence chamber of Anne of Denmark, with a French visitor, the Count of Vaudémont.

In 1608 her younger sister Elizabeth married Edward Zouche of Bramshill, or perhaps Edward Zouch of Woking, Knight Marshall. She died shortly afterwards and was buried in Westminster Abbey in March 1610. Her brother Robert Middlemore of Thornton married Dorothy Fulstowe who also died in 1610. She was a daughter of Richard Fulstowe a servant of Lord Willoughby.

In 1609, an Italian poet, Antimo Galli published a book of verse, including a description The Masque of Queens performed in 1608. He included a stanza praising Mary Middlemore, with a near anagram of her surname name, "La Bella Dea D'Amore".

Around Christmas time 1609/10, Sir Edward Herbert fought with a Scottish gentleman who had snatched a ribbon or "topknot" from her hair in a back room of the queen's lodgings at Greenwich Palace. Herbert would have followed up by fighting a duel in Hyde Park, but the Privy Council prevented it. John Chamberlain recorded that the Scottish man was an usher to the queen named "Boghvan". Subsequently, Edward Herbert became involved with another lady-in-waiting, Dorothy Bulstrode, and was beaten up by husband, John Eyre.

The identity of "Boghvan" is unclear. There was a musician recorded as "Jacques Bochan" and Jacques Cordier dit Bocan. There was a violin player at court in 1609 called "James Bochan". "Mr Bochan" taught the ladies of Anne of Denmark's household dance steps for masques. Bochan, however, was described as a French violer, attached to the household of Prince Henry from 1608 to 1610. A man called "Baughan" is mentioned in the Lincoln's Inn accounts of the masque The Memorable Masque of the Middle Temple and Lincoln's Inn in 1613 as a Marshal not a musician, and perhaps he was Anne's Scottish usher.

The queen's secretary William Fowler dedicated poems to her in 1609, possibly for a third-party, including the Meditation upon Virgin Maryes Hatt, and Aetna which includes her name; "My harte as Aetna burnes, and suffers MORE / Paines in my MIDDLE than ever MARY proved", and devised an Italian anagram "Madre di mill'amori", the mother of a thousand loves.

Middlemore was given mourning clothes on the death of Prince Henry in 1612. On 20 August 1613 Anne of Denmark was received at Wells, Somerset, during her progress to Bath. The mayor William Bull hosted a dinner for members of her household including the four maids of honour.

Anna of Denmark had a portrait of Mary Middlemore at Oatlands. In July 1615 she was bought a bay ambling gelding horse to replace her lame grey horse. After Vincent Skinner's death, her mother Elizabeth Foukes seems also to have joined the queen's household.

On 29 April 1617 Middlemore was granted a licence by the king to have workmen seek treasure in Glastonbury Abbey, St Albans Abbey, Bury St Edmunds Abbey, and Romsey Abbey. She died later in the year, and perhaps did not profit from prospecting in the ruins. The gift has sometimes been assumed to be intended for the queen, but it may be connected with the financial ruin and death of her step-father Sir Vincent Skinner, who had been building a country house at Thornton Abbey. Around this time, her mother joined the queen's household.

Mary Middlemore died of consumption on 3 January 1618 at Whitehall Palace and was buried the next day at Westminster Abbey.
