= George Ferebee =

English composer (floruit 1613)

George Ferebee (or Feribye, Ferrabee, etc.) (floruit 1613) was an English churchman and composer, who was appointed chaplain to King James I.

The son of a Gloucestershire yeoman, Ferebee was born about 1573 and matriculated at Oxford on 25 October 1589, aged 16 (Clark). He was a chorister of Magdalen College until 1591. He was admitted B.A. 1592, licensed to be M.A. 9 July 1595, and became vicar of Bishop's Cannings, Wiltshire, where he arranged for the church to be provided with an organ and a peal of eight bells.

Wood relates how Ferebee found and ingeniously made use of an opportunity to display his talents before Queen Anne, the consort of James I, on her way from Bath, in June 1613; in the dress of an old bard, Ferebee, with his pupils in the guise of shepherds, entertained the royal lady and her suite as they rested at Wensdyke (or Wansdyke) with wind-instrument music, a four-part song beginning 'Shine, O thou sacred Shepherds' star, on silly [or seely] Shepherd swains', and an epilogue. This quaint and courtier-like action earned Ferebee the title of chaplain to the king.

Nichols mentions the publication, on 19 June of the same year, of 'A Thing called "The Shepherd's Songe before Queen Anne in four parts complete musical, upon the Playnes of Salisbury"'. In 1615 appeared 'Life's Farewell, a sermon at St. John's in the Devises in Wilts, 30 Aug. 1614, at the Funerall of John Drew, gent., on 2 Sam. xiv. 14', 4to.
