= Cuthbert Hutton =

English politician

Cuthbert Hutton of Hutton John, Cumberland (by 1512 – 10 September 1553) was an English politician.

Hutton was a Member (MP) of the Parliament of England for Cumberland in 1545. The son of Hugh Hutton of Hutton John, he had around 1529 and certainly by 1540 married Elizabeth Bellingham, a childhood friend of Katherine Parr. Elizabeth was the daughter and coheiress of Robert Bellingham of Burnehead Hall, Burneside, Westmoreland by his wife Anne Pickering. The Huttons had the son John, and at least three daughters, Katherine, Anne, and Mary. Through his daughter Mary he was the grandfather of Richard Huddleston.

When Elizabeth left court, she returned to Hutton John, where she and her husband laid out gardens in the style of those at Hampton Court.

Hutton served in the Scottish war under Edward VI. He was killed, and left as his heir his son John. His widow Elizabeth acquired the wardship.
