= Harefield Entertainment =

English celebratory event in 1602

The Harefield Entertainment included hospitality and performances for Elizabeth I of England on 29 July 1602 and the next four days. Several copies of the performance script survive, probably written by John Davies, along with the original manuscript accounts of the Queen's host which seems to have been manipulated by literary forgery in the 19th-century to enhance their interest.

== Preparations ==
Sir Thomas Egerton, the Lord Keeper, bought Harefield Place, now in the London Borough of Hillingdon, from Sir Edmund Anderson in 1601. The Queen came to Harefield on 29 July 1602, as part of a short progress lasting two weeks. She stayed until 3 August. Egerton's bills for the entertainment and hospitality survive. Some speeches and drama were also recorded and printed. A "lottery" was performed in which gifts were presented to the ladies of the court as humorous rhyming couplets were recited. Modern critics emphasise the likely role of Egerton's wife, Alice, Countess of Derby in planning and devising the events.

The early editor of the records John Payne Collier is thought to have tampered with a page of "Mainwaring's accounts" of expenses to introduce a bogus reference to Richard Burbage and Othello, but the rest of Egerton's expenses are considered authentic.

To feed the queen and her household Egerton bought wheat for bread and "manchet", butter, eggs, gooseberries, chickens, pigeons, geese, rabbits, ducklings, pigs, partridges, trout, lobster, and crayfish and other foods. There was Gascon wine and sack, beer and ale, wine vinegar and oil for cooking, green fruits, herbs, and a hired cook Allin Wardis. Mr Walther made sugar confections. A London pewterer provided plates and dishes. Planks for shelves and tables were boated up the Thames to Brentford. 18,000 bricks were bought to build ovens for the event, and extra lodgings were added to the house. Arras hooks for tapestries were supplied by Page of Uxbridge. Several guests brought gifts of food, George More from Loseley gave a stag, 24 pigeons, and 4 swans, the Warden of the Fleet Prison gave 4 sugar loaves, and the Lord Mayor of London brought a barrel of sack and 6 herons. John Kederminster brought 18 boxes of sweetmeats and 36 fine cakes.

== Events ==
The Queen arrived at Harefield and near the house, sheltering under a tree from the rain, heard a dialogue between a Bailiff and Dairy Maid. They discuss the arrival of guests and gave them welcome. The Dairy Maid apologises for the unfinished state of the house and does not recognise Elizabeth I.

At the entry to the house there was a chair for her, and a dialogue between Place and Time was presented, and the queen was given a diamond heart, said to have cost £300. Place, who wore a robe like the bricks of the house, praised the qualities of the diamond which was transparent and flawless. Set without a backing foil, it had "noe undutifull spot in yt".

Next, Elizabeth was given a gown of cloth of silver embroidered with rainbows by Audrey Walsingham, and a verse recalled the legend of St Swithun. Egerton provided the gown for £340, and the Countess gave the sleeves and cords to attach them with ruby and pearl tags.

A payment to an embroiderer, silkman, and the Queen's tailor is one of Payne Collier's forgeries. The rainbow gown has been connected with the costume depicted in Elizabeth's Rainbow Portrait at Hatfield and the Bacton Altar Cloth.

== The Harefield Lottery ==
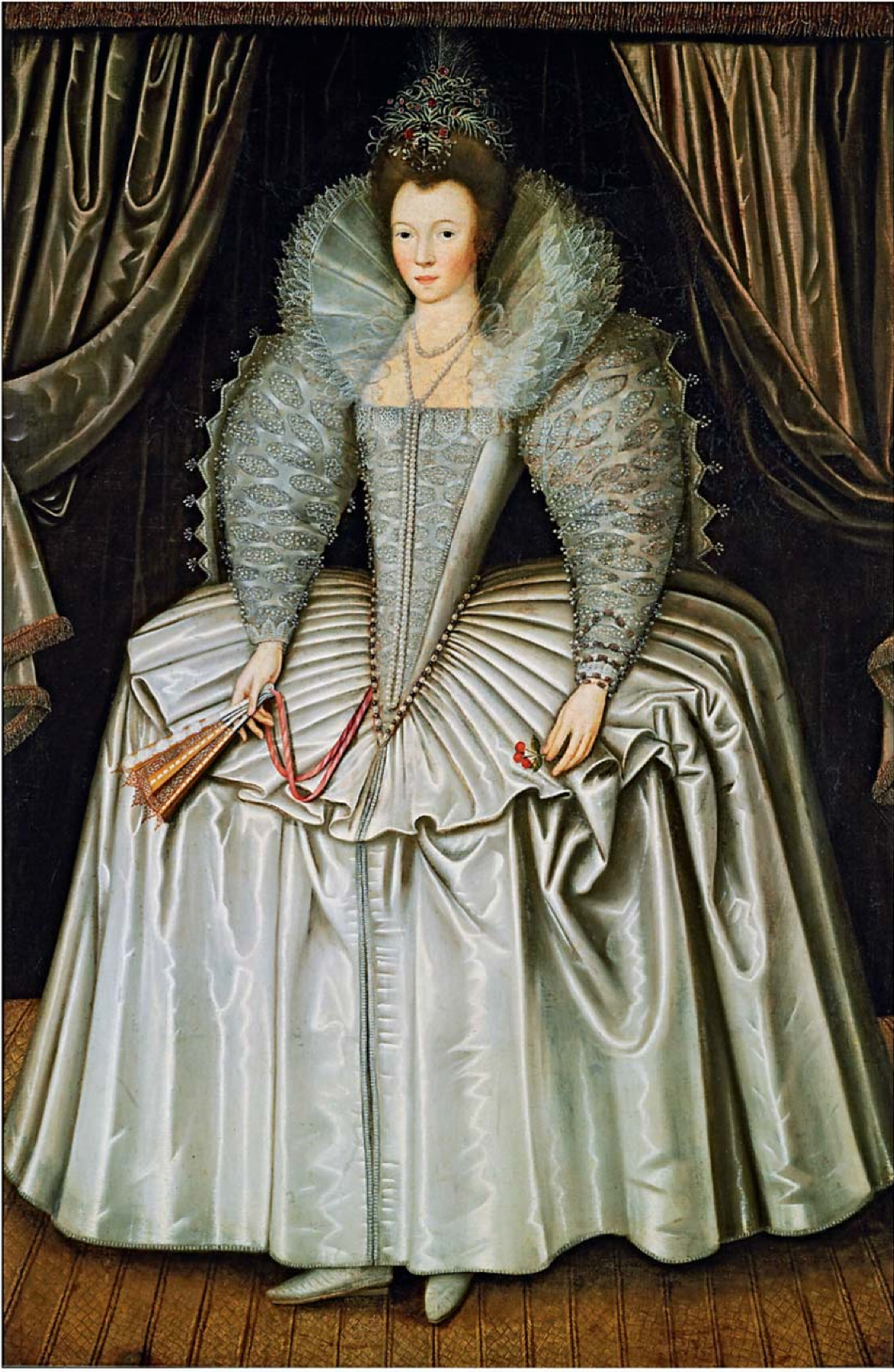
Portrait thought to be Elizabeth Southwell, c. 1600

The concept of the Harefield lottery was the distribution of gifts by a mariner of a rich Carrack, a treasure ship, to the ladies of Cynthia, Queen of the Seas. A carrack from Lisbon had recently been brought to Plymouth. Around thirty women received gifts. Participants in the Harefield lottery included;

- Mary Radcliffe, who was given a pair of bracelets, with this verse, "Lady your hands are fallen in a snare: For Cupid's manacles these bracelets are".
- Lady Warwick was a given a "snufkin", a kind of muff, with the verses, "Tis sommer, yet a snufkin is your lot; But twilbe winter one day, doubt you not".
- Frances, Lady Kildare was given a girdle, with the verses, "By fortune's girdle you may happy be: But they that are less happy are more free".
- Susan Vere drew a blank and was told; "Wit you why fortune gives you no prize: Good faith, she saw you not, she has no eyes".
- Anne Clifford was given a lace, with verses; "Give her the lace that loves to be straight-laced: So fortune's little gift is aptly placed".
- Elizabeth Southwell presented with gloves; "Fortune these gloves to you in double challenge sends: For you hate fools and flatterers, her best friends".
- Philadelphia Carey given a mask or vizard; "Want you a mask! Here fortune give you one: Yet nature gives the rose and lily none".
- Audrey Walsingham had the prize of a cutwork stomacher with the verses; "This stomacher is full of windows wrought: Yet none through them can look into your thought".
- The Mother of the Maids, Elizabeth Wingfield, received a scarf, with the verses; "Take you this scarfe, binde Cupid hand and foote, So Love shall you leave before he shoote".
- Elizabeth Brydges, received a dozen points (clothing toggles) with these verses; "You are in every point a lover true, And therefore fortune gives the points to you".
- Dorothy Hastings, a bodkin, a jewelled hair-pin; Even with this bodkin, you may live unharmed; Your beauty with your virtues so well armed
- Cordell Anslowe or Christian Annesley drew a pin cushion, "To her that little cares what lot she wins: Chance gives a cushinet to stick pins".

At the end of the lottery a feather jewel, worth £600, was found in the box of lottery tickets and was given to Elizabeth, the "lady of the Island". Verses by William Skipwith survive for another lottery entertainment, connected with the masque at Ashby Castle in 1607.

As the Queen left Harefield the final scene was a speech made by the spirit of Place dressed as a widow, who said, "I could wish myself like the enchanted Castle of Love, to hold you here for ever, but your virtues would dissolve my enchantments". The widow gave Elizabeth a jewel in the form of an anchor.

Sir George Savile wrote to the Earl of Shrewsbury with a copy of the farewell speech, and mentioned the expensive presents given to the queen, the two jewels, worth £1000 and £600, and the "gown of rainbows very rich embroidered". The Jesuit Robert Persons was told that Alice, Countess of Derby asked the queen, who was in "her merriest vein" if Anne Stanley and her sister could serve in her privy chamber, or have consent to marry, which displeased the queen who commanded silence on such matters. Anne married Grey Brydges, a cousin of Elizabeth Brydges in 1607.

== Manuscript circulation ==
John Chamberlain sent a copy of the script and verses of the entertainment to Dudley Carleton on 19 November 1602, apologised and regretting his "lost labour" if Carleton had already read it. The speeches and the text of the lottery circulated in manuscript and reached the London lawyer John Manningham who copied a corrupt version of the lottery into his diary. A version of the lottery was printed in Francis Davison's A Poetical Rapsodie (London, 1608). The surviving versions have various differences, and the entertainment as manuscript had a somewhat separate existence to the actual performance.
