= Cordell Annesley =

English courtier

Cordell Annesley (died 1636) was an English courtier.

== Family background ==
Annesley was a daughter of Brian Annesley and Audrey Tirrell (d. 1591), a daughter of Robert Tirrell of Burbrooke. Brian Annesley was a gentleman pensioner of Queen Elizabeth, master of the harriers, and warden of the Fleet Prison. Her grandfather Nicolas Annesley (d. 1593) had been "sergeant of the cellar" to Queen Elizabeth. The surname also appears in the contemporary forms "Anslowe" or "Onslow" or "Ansley".

In November 1596 Brian Annesley, Cordell, and John Wildgose husband of her sister Grace, were granted a house and lands forming part of the manor of Lee in Kent. Her eldest sister Grace had married John Wildgose in 1587. Her sister Christian married William Sandys, 3rd Baron Sandys. A brother, Brian, died young. A distant relation Bridget Annesley was a maid of honour or chamberer to Anne of Denmark from 1609.

== Court of Queen Elizabeth ==
Annesley was a maid of honour to Queen Elizabeth. Sometimes recorded as "Mistress Ansloe", in 1598 a horse known as "White Howard" was kept in the royal stables for her to ride. Amongst news from court in January 1600, Rowland Whyte mentioned that "Mistress Onslow" might marry one Gifford of Hampshire, arranged by Lord Sandys, her brother-in-law. This marriage did not occur. Whyte added that "Mistress Onslow doth exceed the rest in bravery, which is noted". Bravery means finery, that she was well-dressed.

Annesley was probably the "Mistress Onslow" who danced in the masque at the marriage of Anne Russell and Lord Herbert in June 1600. The other dancers, led by Mary Fitton, were Lady Doritye (Dorothy Hastings), Mistress Carey, Elizabeth Southwell, Bess Russell, Mistress Darcy, and Blanche Somerset. They wore skirts of cloth of silver, waistcoats embroidered with coloured silks and silver and gold thread, mantles of carnation taffeta, and "loose hair about their shoulders" which was also "curiously knotted and interlaced".

The husband of Annesley's sister Christian, William Sandys, was implicated in the rebellion of the Earl of Essex in 1601 and Lady Kildare took Grace's letter to the queen to plead for him. She also wrote to Sir Robert Cecil, excusing her husband's fault as he was, "drawn into that clay by that wild Earl's craft". He was pardoned. Christian and William Sandys do not appear to have been very active in the subsequent Annesley family dispute.

Annesley was the "Mistresse Anslowe" mentioned in the Harefield Entertainment in August 1602. During the staged lottery she won a pin cushion, and this couplet was announced, "To her that little cares what lot she wins: Chance gives a cushinet to stick pins".

== Brian Annesley in old age ==
Annesley argued with her sisters over their father's estate when he was old. In 1603, Grace Wildgoose tried to have her father declared senile and incompetent. John Wildgose, acting under advice from Sir Robert Cecil, went to Brian Annesley's house in October 1603 and found him "fallen into such imperfection and distemperature of mind and memory" that he was unfit to manage his estates. Wildgose tried to make an inventory of his possessions. Cordell Annesley, who was looking after her father, prevented this.

Subsequently three men, Thomas Walsingham, James Croft, and Samuel Lennard, acting under Cecil's instructions, went to the house and sealed up trunks and chests of evidence and valuables. Croft was asked to manage Brian Annesley's rents. They noted that his daughters were in "emulation", or quarrelling. They wrote a joint letter to Cecil from Scadbury, the home of Walsingham and his wife Audrey Walsingham, who had played a role in the entertainment at Harefield.

Annesley wrote to Sir Robert Cecil to complain about this. She thanked him for the visit of the "sundry gentlemen of worship" but explained that this was not enough to satisfy Wildgose, who wanted his father-in-law declared a lunatic. She thought her father deserved a different name, "a better agnomination" after his long service to Queen Elizabeth. If her father was declared a lunatic and incompetent to manage her affairs, she preferred that Croft would be made administrator of his estates. Attempts have been made to link this affair with the plot of King Lear and the role of Cordelia, and the reprinting of an older play King Leir in 1605.

Brian Annesley died in 1604. He had made a will in April 1600 bequeathing the manor of Weydon Keylefe (Withdean Keyliffe) in Patcham to Grace Wildgose, Forrest Place and Brockley Farm in Lewisham to Lady Sandys, and other lands in Lewisham to Cordell. Cordell Annesley was executrix of the will and the Wildgoses unsuccessfully disputed this. King James granted the manor of Kidbrooke near Charlton, which had been in his possession, to the Earl of Mar.

== Marriage and family ==
Annesley married William Hervey of Kidbrooke on 4 February 1608 at St Giles-without-Cripplegate. They had three sons and three daughters, including Elizabeth who married John Hervey of Ickworth.

Annesley died on 23 April 1636 at her husband's house on the Strand. A monument at St Margaret's Lee commemorated her parents and the three daughters. The church has been rebuilt and a marble tablet from the tomb was fixed to the remaining ruin of the old tower. It indicated that Annesley had erected the lost monument for her parents, "against the ungrateful nature of oblivious time".
