= Scupper =

Architectural draining feature

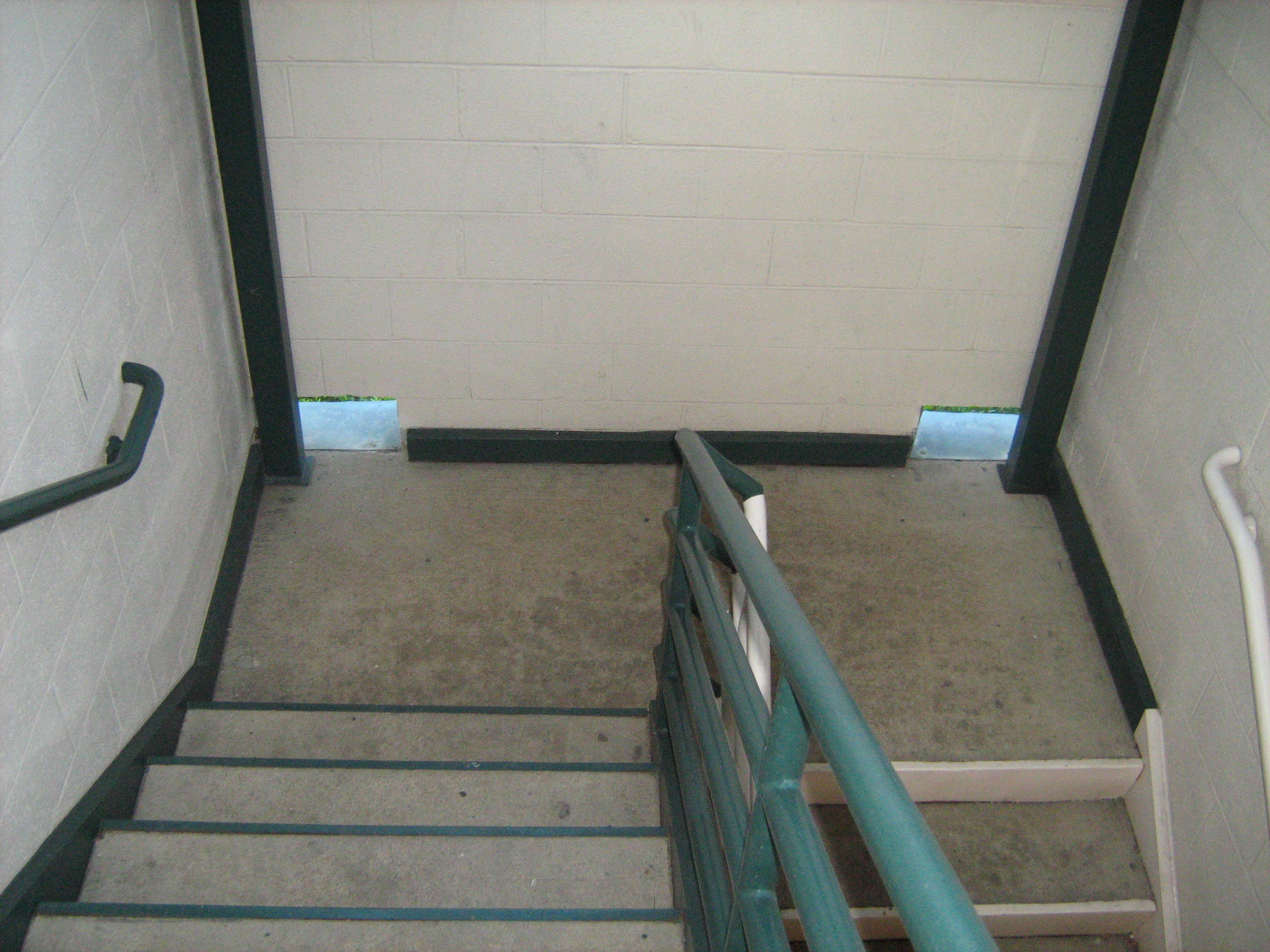
Two scuppers cut into either side of this outdoor stairwell prevent water from building up and making the stairs slippery.

A scupper is an opening in the side walls of a vessel or an open-air structure, which allows water to drain instead of pooling within the bulwark or gunwales of a vessel, or within the curbing or walls of a building.

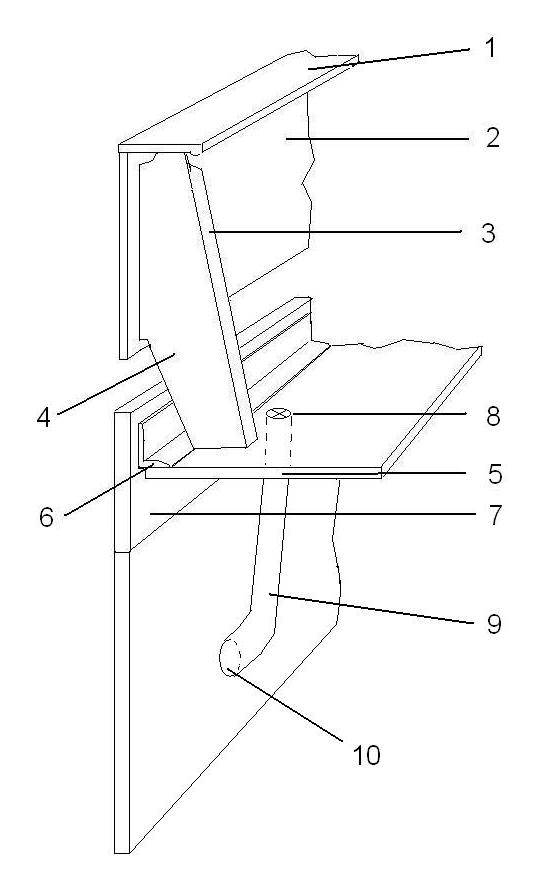
Ship's bulwark. 1. Gunwale, 2. Bulwark plating, 3. Flange, 4. Stanchion, 5. Stringer plate, 6. Stringer angle, 7. Sheerstrake. Scupper: 8. hole (with grille cover), 9. pipe, 10. outlet.

There are two main kinds of scuppers:

1. Ships have scuppers at deck level, to allow for ocean or rainwater drain-off.
2. Buildings with railed rooftops may have scuppers to let rainwater drain instead of pooling within the railing. Scuppers can also be placed in a parapet, for the same purpose.
