= Bishops Cannings =

Village in Wiltshire, England

Coordinates: 51.377°N 1.947°W

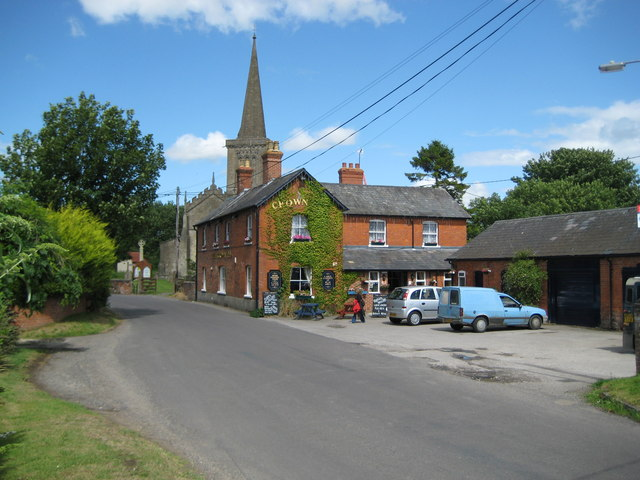
- The Crown Inn, Bishops Cannings, with the church of St Mary the Virgin behind

- Location within Wiltshire
- Population: 3,311 (in 2021)
- OS grid reference: SU038642
- Civil parish: Bishops Cannings
- Unitary authority: Wiltshire
- Ceremonial county: Wiltshire
- Region: South West
- Country: England
- Sovereign state: United Kingdom
- Post town: Devizes
- Postcode district: SN10
- Dialling code: 01380
- Police: Wiltshire
- Fire: Dorset and Wiltshire
- Ambulance: South Western
- UK Parliament: Melksham and Devizes
- Website: Parish Council

Bishops Cannings is a village and civil parish in the Vale of Pewsey in Wiltshire, England, 3 miles (5 km) north-east of Devizes. The parish includes the village of Coate (not to be confused with Coate, Swindon) and the hamlets of Bourton, Horton and Little Horton.

== Geography ==
Etchilhampton Water, a minor tributary of the Salisbury Avon, rises from streams in the parish and flows south past Etchilhampton to Patney. The northern part of the parish lies on the Marlborough Downs, including Morgan's Hill and part of Roundway Hill.

Bishops Cannings village is about 0.5 miles (0.80 km) south of the A361 road which links Devizes with Avebury and Swindon.

== History ==
Prehistoric remains include two long barrows including Kitchen Barrow on a slope in the north-east of the parish and Horton Down Long Barrow on agricultural land near the hamlet of Horton. The area also features a square earthwork enclosure of uncertain date on Morgan's Hill in the north-west. A section of the Wansdyke crosses the parish, west from Tan Hill to Morgan's Hill. The name Cannings derives from the Old English Canaingas meaning 'Cana's people'. The manor of Cannings was recorded in the 1086 Domesday Book as held by the Bishop of Salisbury; there was a substantial population of 127 households, with six mills.

Horton is first attested in 1158. The place-name is a common one in England and derives from Old English horu 'dirt' and tūn 'settlement, farm, estate', presumably meaning 'farm on muddy soil'.

In the 16th and 17th centuries, Bourton manor was an estate of the Ernle family. The manor included the hamlet of Easton but today the name survives only at Easton Farm and Easton Down.

In the 1660s the lease of the manor of Cannings was bought by Paul Methuen (d. 1667) of Bradford-on-Avon, reputedly the richest cloth merchant in England. His son John (c.1650–1706) was MP for Devizes, and simultaneously Lord Chancellor of Ireland and ambassador to Portugal. John's son Paul (c.1672–1757) deputised for his father at Lisbon, sat for Devizes and Brackley (Northamptonshire), became a government minister and held offices in the royal household; he sold the estate in 1720.

The Wansdyke medieval earthwork crosses the north of parish. The Kennet and Avon Canal (opened in 1810) was built through the parish, passing between Bishops Cannings and Horton.

On the 27 May 1941, a Royal Air Force De Havilland Dragon Rapide (R5929) was operating a training flight out of RAF Yatesbury. The aircraft stalled at low altitude and crashed near the village, killing all seven on board.

== Boundaries ==
Bishops Cannings was anciently part of the hundred of Potterne and Cannings. The parish is now the third largest in Wiltshire, but was formerly larger, having lost a large area to the nearby town of Devizes in 1835 and to the new parish of Roundway in 1894.

Bishops Cannings parish had previously encircled Devizes to the north, east and south, and reached as far into the town as the Crammer, a large pond on the edge of the town centre. This may explain how Bishops Cannings comes to lay claim to being the place of origin of the legend of the Moonrakers. Next to the pond is the 15th-century church of St James, which was a chapelry of Bishops Cannings.

Further expansion of the borough of Devizes in 1934 brought Wick and the whole of St James's chapelry (sometimes called Southbroom, and including Southbroom House) into the town, while the Nursteed tithing became part of Roundway. In 2017 Roundway became a ward of Devizes. A north-eastern part of the Devizes built-up area known as Northfields, between the canal and Horton Road and including retailers Lidl and B&Q and the former Le Marchant Barracks, remains within Bishops Cannings parish.

== Local government ==
Bishops Cannings is a civil parish with an elected parish council. It is in the area of Wiltshire Council unitary authority, which is responsible for almost all significant local government functions.

== Religious sites ==
=== Parish church ===
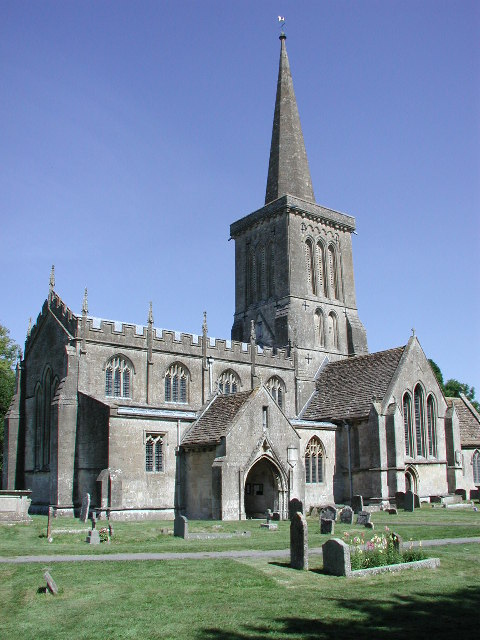
Church of St Mary the Virgin

The Church of England parish church of St Mary the Virgin is Grade I listed. Originating in the 12th or 13th century, with many Early English features surviving, it was altered in the 14th and 15th centuries and restored in the 19th. Pevsner writes that it has "uncommon size and nobility", through being part of a bishop's estate.

Domesday Book recorded a priest but did not mention a church. The earliest parts of the building are a damaged 12th-century scallop capital in the chancel, and one of the chancel's west lancet windows which is from the late 12th century or early 13th. The three-bay chancel, mostly in rubble stone, is from the mid-13th century.

The church has a cruciform plan and is in ashlar apart from the chancel and sacristy. The large central tower carries a spire, and the four-bay nave (which originally had a higher roof) has aisles and a south porch. A lady chapel – since 1563 the Ernle family chapel – is attached to the east of the south transept. The porch has a round-headed 13th-century arch to the inner doorway, while the outer parts are 15th-century. There is an unusual two-storey sacristy at the north-east corner, in stone and flint; the ground floor is 13th-century and the upper floor perhaps 15th. The spire was added in the 15th century and around the same time the crossing and parts of the transepts were rebuilt. The nave had a clerestory from an early date, and this was rebuilt at greater height in the same century. The nave roof carries a date of 1670.

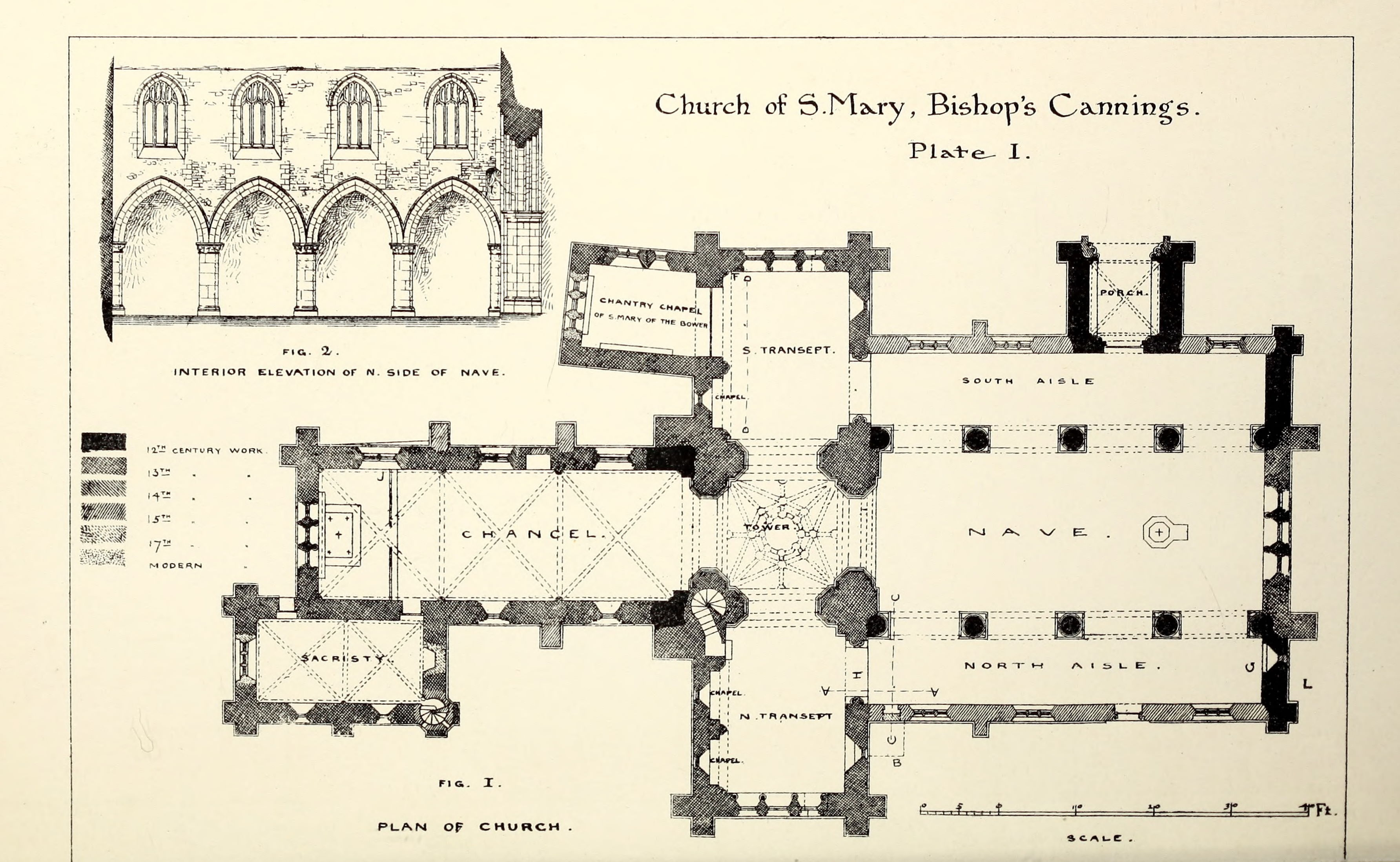
Ponting's plan of the church, 1880s

Restoration in the 19th century involved little major work. Orbach states that the Gothic stalls in the chancel are from T.H. Wyatt's restoration in 1860, and gives the same year for the richly decorated east window by Wailes. The chapel was rebuilt in 1862–3, with a new east window. Further restoration by the Wiltshire architect C.E. Ponting in 1883–4 included re-roofing of the aisles and transepts, and renewal of the pews in that area, with carving by Harry Hems. Ponting's description of the church, with drawings, was published in the Wiltshire Archaeological and Natural History Magazine in 1887.

Furnishings include a carrel desk (English Heritage) which Pevsner describes as a penitential seat and a "great oddity"; it is partly 15th-century. The octagonal font is late 15th-century. George Ferebee, vicar, arranged for an early organ to be installed around 1593, and in 1602 provided a peal of eight bells from the foundry of John Wallis. The present organ by George Pike England is from 1809. Four of Ferebee's bells remain in the tower, the others being recast or replaced in 1840 or later. A 15th-century chest tomb in the churchyard is Grade II* listed.

In 1091, Bishop Osmond gave Cannings church and its considerable income to the new cathedral at Salisbury. The rectory manor, known as Cannings Canonicorum, remained in the ownership of the cathedral's dean and chapter (but generally leased out) until they sold it at the beginning of the 19th century. The parish remained a peculiar until such jurisdictions were abolished in the 19th century. Today the parish comes under the Cannings and Redhorn Team Ministry, alongside seven others.

=== Others ===
The church of St James on the edge of Devizes (15th-century tower, rest rebuilt 1831–2) was a chapelry of St Mary's, although it had its own graveyard by 1505. In 1832 a parish (a perpetual curacy) was created for it, covering the tithings of Bedborough, Nursteed, Roundway, and Wick. Boundary changes in 1835 brought the church inside the municipal borough.

The hamlet of Chittoe, some 5 miles (8 km) to the north-west near Bromham, was a detached part of Bishops Cannings parish until a church was built there in 1845.

A Wesleyan Methodist chapel was opened at Horton in 1832 and closed in the second half of the 20th century.

At Coate, a Brethren chapel was built in 1848 and closed in 1973.

== Amenities ==
Bishops Cannings has a primary school which serves the parish and the eastern side of Devizes. A National School was built in 1830 and transferred to the present site in 1907. The chapel at Coate was used as a school from 1848 until 1876, when a new school was opened nearby; this school closed in 1929.

The parish has four pubs: the Crown Inn at Bishops Cannings, the Bridge Inn near Horton, the New Inn at Coate, and the Hourglass at Devizes Marina on the Kennet and Avon Canal. Part of North Wilts Golf Club, on the downs, is within the parish, near the Morgan's Hill Site of Special Scientific Interest.

== Notable people ==
- Around 1613 George Ferebee, vicar of Bishops Cannings, was appointed chaplain to King James I.
- William Bayly (1737–1810), the son of a Bishops Cannings farmer, was recognised for his mathematical prowess. He was employed by the Royal Observatory and sailed as an astronomer on two of Cook's voyages. After completing his career as head-master of the Royal Academy, Portsmouth, in 1809 he paid for the organ in the parish church of his home village.
