= Richard Huddleston (monk) =

English Benedictine monk

Richard Huddleston or Hudleston (1583–1655), was an English Benedictine monk.

== Life ==
Huddleston was born in 1583 at Farington Hall, near Preston, Lancashire. He was the youngest son of Andrew Hudleston, esq., of Farington Hall, and Mary, the third daughter of Cuthbert Hutton of Hutton John, Cumberland. He studied under Thomas Sommers, a Catholic schoolmaster at Grange-over-Sands, Lancashire, and was subsequently sent to the English College at Douay.

Afterwards he studied philosophy and divinity for some years in the English College at Rome. Returning to Douay he was ordained a priest in 1607, and in the following year was sent on the English mission. Again visiting Italy he was professed as a Benedictine monk at Monte Cassino. In 1619 he came back to the mission, and was instrumental in conversions among major families in Lancashire and Yorkshire to the Roman Catholic faith. One example is that of the family of Sir John Gascoigne whose children, nearly all, opted for a religious life including Catherine Gascoigne who was an abbess in Cambrai until 1673.

Huddleston died at Stockeld Park, the seat of the Middletons, on 26 November 1655.

== Works ==
Huddleston left several pieces in manuscript, which appear to have been lost, and a Short and Plain Way to the Faith and Church, published by his nephew, Father John Hudleston, London, 1688; reprinted in the "English Catholic Library" vol. ii., London, 1844, under the editorial care of the Rev. Mark Aloysius Tierney; and again, London, 1850. Charles II, while concealed at Moseley after the defeat at Worcester, read this treatise in manuscript, and declared that he had seen nothing clearer upon the subject. An Answer to Father Huddleston's Short and Plain Way was published by an anonymous writer; and at a later period another Answer, by Samuel Grascome, appeared at London, 1702; 1715.
