= Samuel Grascome =

Samuel Grascome (1641–1708) was a clergyman of the Church of England, then, after the nonjuring schism, a member of the breakaway church.

== Early life ==
The son of John Grascome of Coventry, he was educated at Coventry grammar school, and was admitted a sizar at Magdalene College, Cambridge, on 1 June 1661, aged 19. He graduated B.A. in 1664, and M.A. in 1674. On 10 December 1680 he was appointed rector of Stourmouth in Kent. He remained there till his deprivation in 1690, when he settled in London, and gathered a congregation at a house in Scroop's Court, in the parish of St Andrew's, Holborn. He found a patron in Sir Thomas Fanshawe of Jenkins.

== Critic of the House of Commons ==
During the debates on the Recoinage Act, in 1695–6, Grascome was thought to have published An Account of the Proceedings in the House of Commons in relation to the Recoining the Clipt Money and Falling the Price of Guineas; Brunton writing in the Oxford Dictionary of National Biography considers that the author may have been in fact Thomas Wagstaffe, with Grascome doing the legwork. Criticising the House of Commons of the time, which had pushed through the Great Recoinage of 1696, the author argued for a public record of the votes of Members of Parliament. Grascombe had done private research on placemen among them, listing over 100, since the 1692–3 session. The pamphlet contravened parliamentary privilege by giving a division list for the Recoinage Act.

In November 1696 the House voted that the pamphlet was "false, scandalous, and seditious, and destructive of the freedom and liberties of parliament", ordered it to be burned by the common hangman, and petitioned the king to offer a reward for the discovery of the author. On 14 December a proclamation appeared for the apprehension of Grascome, but he escaped. The hunt did find Francis Turner, under an alias, who was arrested.

In February 1699 the attorney-general was ordered to prosecute Grascome. The trial was postponed, and on 3 July it was dropped altogether, the printer, who was the only witness against him, having fled the country. It is suggested that Grascome came to an arrangement with the authorities.

== Later life ==
Grascome spent the last years of his life in theological controversy, defending the nonjurors, and denouncing dissent, occasional conformity, and the Roman Catholic church. He was a strong partisan, and Francis Lee thought that he had damaged the nonjurors' reputation with the government.

== Works ==
Grascome, in common with George Hickes, at one point used the printer William Anderton, who produced also Jacobite literature: in 1693 Anderton was found with Grascome's Remarks on the Present Confederacy. An Appeal of Murther, 1693, was Grascome's anonymous comment on the death sentence for Anderton.

Grascome wrote also:

- A Letter to a Friend in answer to a Letter against Mr. Louth in Defence of Dr. Stillingfleet, London, 1688. Edward Stillingfleet had written the tract referred to in 1684. Defends Simon Lowth against alleged misrepresentation by Robert Grove.
- A Further Account of the Baroccian Manuscript, 1691. Against Humphrey Hody's reading of a Byzantine manuscript in the Bodleian Library (cf. Codex Baroccianus). Epistola ad Humfridum Hody may be the letter appended to the preceding work, which is dated 1 January 1691.
- A Brief Answer to a late Discourse concerning the Unreasonableness of a new Separation, 1691; reply to Stillingfleet. Bishop Williams of Chichester issued a defence of Stillingfleet, to which Grascome responded in A Reply to a Vindication of a Discourse, 1691.
- The Separation of the Church of Rome from the Church of England, founded upon a selfish interest, 1691.
- An Answer to "God's Ways of disposing of Kingdoms", reply to a pamphlet by Bishop William Lloyd of St. Asaph, 1691.
- Two Letters written to the Author of a Pamphlet entituled Solomon and Abiathar, or the Case of the Deprived Clergy discussed, 1692. Against Samuel Hill. Here Grascome discusses the hard lot of ejected nonjurors.
- An Historical Account of the Antiquity and Unity of the Britanick Churches. … By a Presbyter of the Church of England, signed S. G., 1692.
- Considerations upon the Second Canon in the Book entituled Constitutions, 1693. The author, Grascome or perhaps Abednego Sellar, observed, as Hickes and Jeremy Collier did, that the Williamite argument for taking the oaths (to William and Mary), from right of conquest, had traction on doubters.
- An Account of the Proceedings in the House of Commons in relation to the Recoining the Clipt Money and Falling the Price of Guineas, 1696.
- A Brief Examination of some Passages in the Chronological Part of a Letter written to Dr. Sherlock. In a Letter to a Friend, c.1700. The ascription of this pamphlet and the preceding to Grascome has been doubted.
- The Scripture History of the Sabbath, London, 1700.
- An Answer to a Book entituled "A Short and Plain Way to the Faith and Church", London, 1702; second edition, 1715. Reply to Richard Huddleston.
- England's Black Tribunal (fourth edition), to which is added An Historical Preface by a True Churchman (i.e. Grascome), 1703.
- Occasional Conformity a most unjustifiable practice, London, 1704; also ascribed to William Higden.
- Some Remarks … upon "A Compassionate Enquiry into the Causes of the Civil War", reply to a sermon of White Kennett, London, 1704.
- Certamen Religiosum, or a Dispute manag'd by writing between a Papist and a Protestant …; with a Preface concerning the Occasion of the Dispute, and a Letter of Mr. Chillingworth … shewing his Reasons why he deserted the Church of Rome. By S. G., 1704.
- Concordia Discors, or some Animadversions upon a late Treatise entituled "An Essay for a Catholick Communion" … by a Presbyter of the Church of England, 1705. The "Essay" has been attributed to Thomas Dean and Joshua Basset(t); Basset is now doubted.
- Moderation in Fashion, or an Answer to a Treatise written by Mr. F. Tallent, entituled "Short History of Schism", &c. … By S. G., a Presbyter of the Church of England, 1705. Francis Tallents replied, and Grascome answered him again in Schism Triumphant, or a Rejoinder to a Reply of Mr. Tallent's, entituled "Some Considerations", &c., 1707.

Lee ascribed most of these treatises to Grascome, in his Memoirs of John Kettlewell, § 55, and added:

- The History of Schism.
- The Mask of Moderation pulled off, 1704. Argues for the Tory view of history since 1641.
- The True Character of a Church of England Man, 1702.
- A Resolution of a Case of Conscience concerning going to Church, 1719. Against mental reservation in oath-taking, from the period 1688–9.
- A Letter to Dr. William Payne. From 1688–9, against William Payne, a latitudinarian critic of the nonjurors.
- The Present State of England.
- An Appeal to True Englishmen, 1699.
- New Court Contrivances, 1693; with some other papers and pamphlets in dialogue or letter form.

Posthumous was An Answer to some Queries sent by a Roman Catholic to a Divine of the Church of England. It was printed in Second Collection of Controversial Tracts (1710) by Hickes, who said he found it in Grascome's handwriting among his papers after his death.

== Notes ==
Attribution

This article incorporates text from a publication now in the public domain: Stephen, Leslie; Lee, Sidney, eds. (1890). "Grascome, Samuel". Dictionary of National Biography. Vol. 22. London: Smith, Elder & Co.
