= Mother of the Maids (English royal court) =

Mother of the Maids was a position at the English royal court. The Mother of the Maids was responsible for the well-being and decorum of maids of honour, young gentlewomen in the household of a queen regnant or queen consort. At the Tudor court, the Mother of Maids or Mother of Maidens was supposed to act to high and impeachable moral standards, so portraying the Queens household as a place of virtue.

== Households of the Tudor queens ==
According to William Latymer, Anne Boleyn held meetings with her maids of honour and the mother of maids Mary Marshall in the privy chamber, and "before the mother of maydes wold give them a long charge of their behaviours".

Anne of Cleves brought a household with her to England, and in 1540 "Mother Lowe" was the mother of the "Dowche Maydes".

Anne Poyntz was given a "billiment" head dress to wear at the coronation of Mary I of England, and took part in the Royal Entry. Anne Poyntz died in 1554, and Dorothy Broughton was appointed in her place as Mother of the Maidens. Dorothy Broughton returned to court from Woodstock Palace where she was serving in the household of Lady Elizabeth, then in the care of Henry Bedingfeld. Margaret Morton was sent to Woodstock to fill Broughton's place. In 1556, Dorothy Broughton and six maids of honour were each given a gilt "cruse" or cup.

At the coronation of Elizabeth I in 1559 there were six maids of honour under the Mother of the Maids. At the Harefield Entertainment in August 1602, a lottery was staged and costume accessories were given to the queen's ladies. The mother of the maids received a scarf.

== Stuart courts ==
An ordinance for the English household of Anne of Denmark made on 20 July 1603 allows for six maids (of honour) and a mother (of maids) and four chamberers.

In 1632, the Mother of Maids, Ursula Beaumont, and six maids of honour at the court of Henrietta Maria took part in the masque The Shepherd's Paradise. When one of the maids, Eleanor Villiers, a daughter of Edward Villiers, was pregnant, she, her partner Henry Jermyn, and Beaumont, Mother of the Maids, were imprisoned in the Tower of London.

== Mothers of the maids ==
- Elizabeth Chamber or Stonor, to the consorts of Henry VIII.
- Mary, Mistress Marshall, household of Anne Boleyn. As Mother of the Maidens, she was given a gilt cruse or cup as a New Years Day gift in 1534.
- Mother Lowe, household of Anne of Cleves, as mother of the "Dutch maids".
- Anne Poyntz (died 1554), household of Mary I in 1553-1554.
- Dorothy Broughton, household of Mary I in 1556, may have been Dorothy, the wife of Sir Robert Broughton and the sister of Margery Wentworth, and through her the aunt of Jane Seymour.
- Elizabeth Hutton, household of Mary I in 1558.
- Mistress Morris, household of Elizabeth I in 1558.
- Kat Ashley or Katherine Ashley, household of Elizabeth I
- Anne Aglionby, household of Elizabeth I
- Elizabeth Hyde, household of Elizabeth I, in 1575.
- Elizabeth Wingfield née Leche, half-sister of Bess of Hardwick and wife of Sir Anthony Wingfield (died 1593) a gentleman usher. Mother of the Maids between 1567 and 1598. Her second husband was George Pollard of Langley, an usher daily waiter and Black Rod under James VI and I.
- Elizabeth Jones (died 1608), household of Elizabeth I, with Blanche Parry in 1571.
- Katherine Bridges, household of Anne of Denmark. She received a free gift of £100 in 1611.
- Elizabeth or Ursula Beaumont, household of Henrietta Maria of France.
- Bridget Sanderson, wife of William Sanderson of the king's privy chamber, a daughter of Edward Tyrrell, household of Catherine of Braganza.
