= Rowland Whyte =

Elizabethan official

Rowland Whyte (died after 1626) was an Elizabethan official and businessman, whose letters provide important evidence about the latter stages of the life of Queen Elizabeth I and the transition to the rule of James I. The letters were first published in 1746 as Letters and Memorials of State, edited by Arthur Collins.

== Life and career ==
Whyte was the son of Richard Whyte of Beaumaris, Anglesey. He was born in Anglesey and in 1601 wrote a letter asking to be appointed as muster-master (militia recruiter) for the area. Before that he seems to have travelled on the continent and gained a reputation with the Sidney family for honesty and efficiency in business. He worked for the Sidneys in the 1590s, possibly serving in some military capacity at one point.

In 1595 he was sent to London by Sir Robert Sidney, who had been appointed as governor of Flushing (Vlissingen in the Netherlands). His role was to lobby for resources for Flushing, while also relaying to Sir Robert the latest political gossip from court. Each of his letters, therefore, is essentially a news report with updates on events. Whyte also wrote newsletters to the Earl of Shrewsbury. From 1598 to 1614 Whyte was also employed as "postmaster of the court", which entailed managing the Royal Mail and organising posting points for horses during royal progresses.

In 1599 Whyte married. He and his wife had many children, though the exact number is uncertain. During this period he acquired leases on several properties, including farms and other properties which he rented. He also seems to have used his aristocratic contacts to obtain income by collecting fines. He was made lifetime Constable of Caernarfon Castle, at an annual income of £60, but he later sold the post back to the king for £500. He seems to have left London around 1614, to return to Wales. The date of his death is not known, but his last letter is dated 27 July 1626.

== Letters ==
Whyte is known for his character sketches of notable people at court, especially the influential aristocrats of the day, such as the Earl of Essex, the Herberts, Cecils (Lord Burghley and his son Robert Cecil) and other lesser figures. After Essex's unwonted return from Ireland, Whyte describes the disorder and uncertainty it created:

His lordship's sudden return out of Ireland brings all sorts of knights, captains, officers, and soldiers, away from thence, that this town is full of them, to the great discontentment of her majesty, that they are suffered to leave their charge. But the most part of the gallants have quitted their commands, places, and companies, not willing to stay there after him; so that the disorder seems to be greater there than stands with the safety of that service.

While he mentions literature and plays, he generally has nothing to say about them except as occasions for gossip and social networking. He often makes barbed comments and is regularly frustrated when he gets unreadable letters back from Sir Robert, whose handwriting was apparently indecipherable. He was also dismayed by his employer's spendthrift ways.

== Notes ==
- Michael Brennan, Noel Kinnamon, Margaret Hannay, The Letters of Rowland Whyte to Sir Robert Sidney (Philadelphia, 2013).
