= Eagle Theatre =

Eagle Theatre may refer to:

- Eagle Theatre (Sacramento, California)
- Eagle Theatre (Pontiac, Michigan), added to the National Register of Historical Places in 1984.
- Eagles Auditorium Building, a seven-story historic theatre and apartment building in Seattle, Washington
- Eagle Theatre in Hammonton, New Jersey, the first theater in New Jersey to sell alcoholic beverages
- Eagle Theatre (Boston, Massachusetts)
- Eagles Theatre in Wabash, Indiana
- Manhattan Theatre, a Broadway theatre known as the Eagle Theatre from 1875-1878
