= Edwin Ford =

Edwin H Ford
- Born: January 12, 1861; Wabash, Indiana
- Died: September 3, 1933 (aged 72)
- Occupation: Inventor
- Known for: Founder of The Ford Meter Box Company
- Spouse: Elizabeth Neff

Edwin H. Ford, founder of The Ford Meter Box Company, Inc., was born in Wabash, Indiana, on January 12, 1861, to Dr. James and America Ford. Edwin was the youngest of six children. Shortly after Edwin's birth, his father, Dr. Ford, enlisted as an Army surgeon for the Union Army. Edwin was ten years younger than his next sibling and grew up almost as an only child. He had a natural aptitude for math and science and taught himself how to draft.

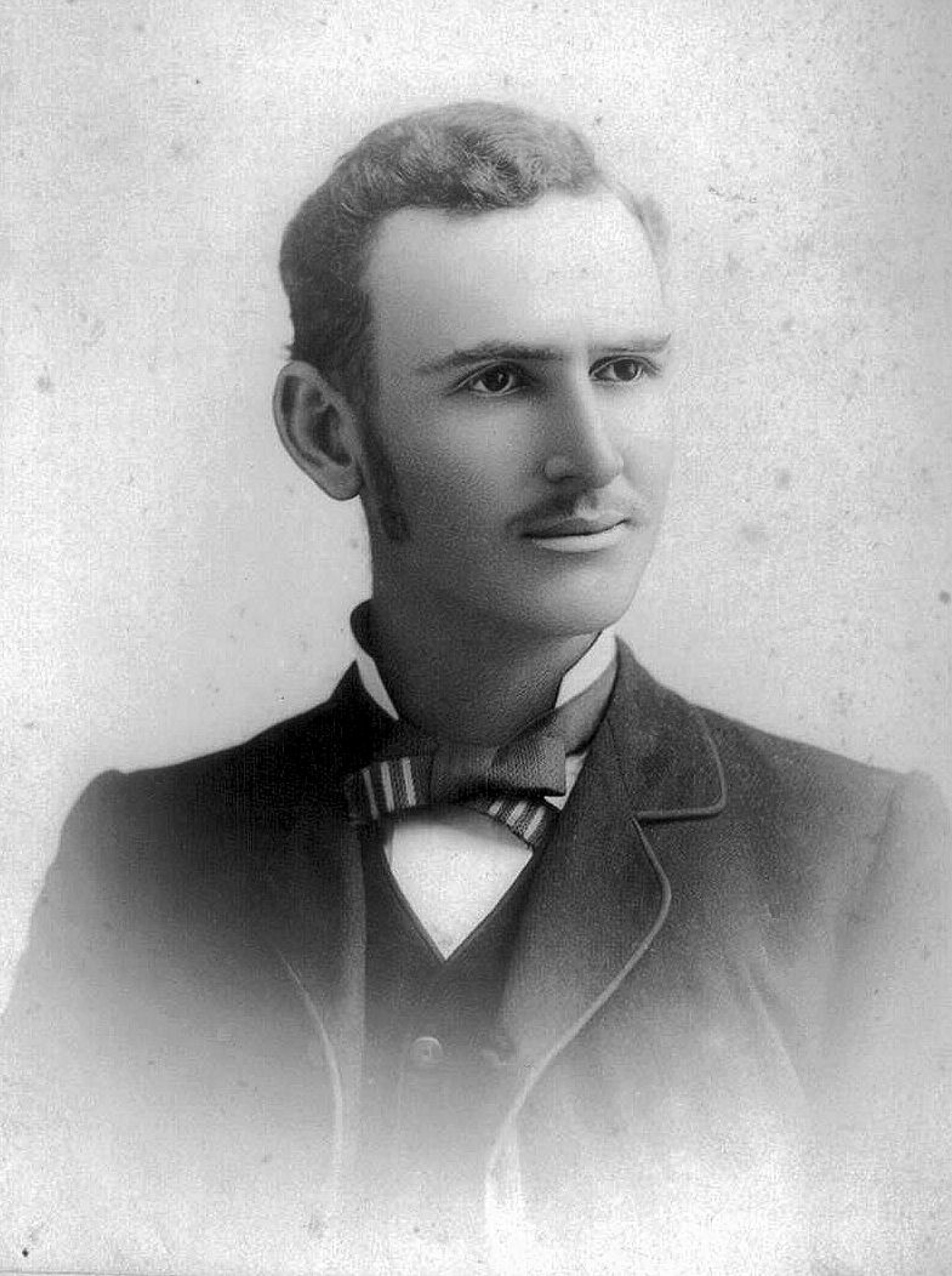
Edwin Ford as a young man.

In 1881, at the age of 20, Edwin moved to Blackford County, Indiana to farm acreage owned by his father. Shortly after moving to Blackford County, Edwin was elected Justice of the Peace in 1883. Edwin married Elizabeth Neff in 1891 in Wabash, and they moved to Hartford City, Indiana. Together, they had five sons: Holton (1893), Wilbur (1895), John (1897), Richard (1900), and Frederick (1904).

In the 1890s, the availability of cheap fuel brought an influx of French and Belgian glass workers to the area. Edwin invested in a glass factory, but lost his investments during the Panic of 1893. Unemployed, he accepted an offer to be Hartford City's first Water Superintendent in 1895. Running water was a novelty in rural Indiana, and Edwin soon faced water shortages. He felt the best way to encourage water conservation was through metering. However, he needed an easy way to access the water meters. So, he designed the first water meter pit and applied for a patent. He received the patent for his invention on September 19, 1899. He began installing meter pits in his community, and news of his success spread to neighboring towns. Edwin found himself filling orders from his basement workshop, and his wife managed the bookkeeping.

In 1911, Edwin lost his job due to political changes, and his youngest son, Frederick, died from an illness. At the wake of his son's funeral, his friends encouraged him to move back to Wabash and make meter pits full-time. Edwin moved his family to Wabash and incorporated his fledgling business, The Ford Meter Box Company, Inc. Under Edwin's direction, the company saw growth and expanded product offerings. Edwin died September 3, 1933. His legacy continues through his family-owned manufacturing company.
