= Honeywell Studio =

- U.S. National Register of Historic Places
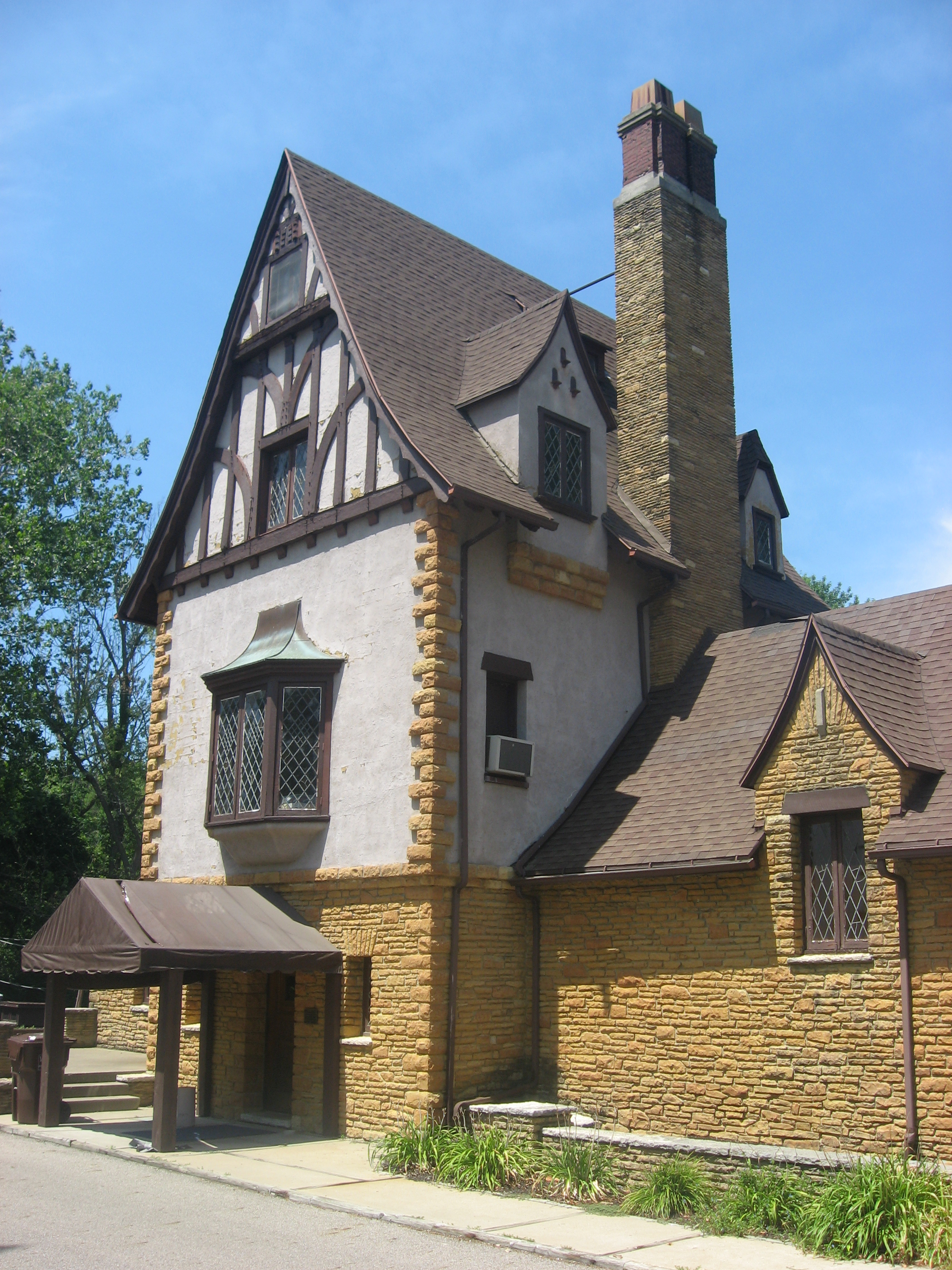
- Honeywell Studio, July 2012

- Location within Indiana Location within the United States
- Location: 378 N. IN 15, Wabash, Indiana
- Coordinates: 40°49′49″N 85°51′26″W
- Area: less than one acre
- Built: 1936
- Architect: Strauss, A.M.; Webb, Floyd
- Architectural style: Tudor Revival
- NRHP reference No.: 05000609
- Added to NRHP: June 17, 2005

Honeywell Studio, also known as the Wabash Country Club, is a historic clubhouse located at Wabash, Indiana. It was built in 1936, and is a Tudor Revival style masonry building. It consists of a five-story central tower with a 1 1/2-story east wing and one-story west wing. An addition was constructed in 1946 and the terrace enclosed in 1967. It was originally built as the private movie studio of Mark Honeywell (1874–1964) and leased to the Wabash Country Club in 1945.

It was listed on the National Register of Historic Places in 2005.
