= Oregonda =

2023 film by Eric Shook and Leanne Johnson

- Directed by: Eric Shook; Leanne Johnson
- Screenplay by: Eric Shook; Leanne Johnson
- Starring: Leanne Johnson; Eric Shook; Jeff Angel; Kevin Wallace; Jonni Shandor; Jonathan Martin; Dannon Everett; Kristy Rose; Sonja Wallace; Sean Rose
- Cinematography: Eric Shook; Leanne Johnson
- Edited by: Eric Shook
- Music by: Eric Shook; Brianna Tam
- Distributed by: Westfield Entertainment (U.S.)
- Release date: January 10, 2023
- Running time: 83 minutes
- Country: United States
- Language: English
- Budget: $100,000

Oregonda is a 2023 American independent science fiction film. The film was written and directed by Eric Shook and Leanne Johnson, and stars Leanne Johnson, Eric Shook, Jeff Angel and Kevin Wallace, with Jonni Shandor. The film is about an elite military reconnaissance squadron assigned to Star Force Galactic command to obtain information from alien laboratory located behind enemy lines.

Oregonda was released online on January 10, 2023, followed by a theatrical release by Westfield Entertainment on May 16, 2023. The film received generally positive reviews.

== Plot ==
Star Force Galactic Command is battling to protect earth's solar system from the ruthless Draconian when intel is obtained of a bioweapon that could destroy humanity. Despite ongoing repairs, the spacecraft Oregonda must leave port from the command ship Nastron and travel into enemy territory to retrieve evidence of the weapons existence before it's too late. Piloted by the tenacious Captain Leila Collins (Leanne Johnson) and commanded by headstrong Major Remus Hughes (Eric Shook) the Oregonda embarks on a reconnaissance mission of action, adventure, and intrigue in order to turn the war and save the world.

== Cast ==
- Leanne Johnson as Captain Leila Collins, a Star Force tenacious command officer assigned aboard the Oregonda spacecraft.
- Eric Shook as Major Remus Hughes, a head strong unpredictable command officer of Star Force galactic command assigned to the Oregonda spacecraft.
- Jeff Angel as Soran, a powerful Draconian empire officer that is ruthless and incharge of an outpost within Draconian territory.
- Kevin Wallace as General Tomas T. MacBain, a high-ranking military officer in Star Force and commander of the star ship Nastron.
- Jonni Shandor as Davy the young female lost from her mother, hiding from the Draconin army on a planet called Balo.
- Jonathan Martin as Captain Liam Callaway, a Star Force captain whose spaceship Kumar is damaged without power.
- Dannon Everett as Lieutenant Will Martin, an engineering officer aboard the star ship Nastron.
- Sonja Wallace as Captain Sarah Nikolovski, communications officer aboard the star ship Nastron.
- Kristy Rose as Oregonda spacecraft onboard computer voice number one.
- Sean Rose as ship departure voice on the star ship Nastron.

== Music ==
The theme song to Oregonda was composed by Eric Shook in 2018 and registered with the U.S. Copyright Office as a copyrighted musical film score as "OREGONDA THEME STAR FORCE" on September 18, 2020. The theme was later being mixed and played by Brianna Tam on an electric cello in 2022.

== Release and reception ==
The film premiered at the Eagles Theatre in Wabash Indiana June 16, 2023".

A Rotten Tomatoes critic review from the independent critic Richard Propes makes the statement that Oregonda possesses an undeniably retro vibe that is so strong I half expected red shirts to show up. Early Star Trek is always around the cinematic corner here, partly out of budgetary necessity and mostly out of a deep love for classic sci-fi by both Johnson and Shook. Unsurprisingly, Oregonda is at its best when its focus is on the duo of Shook and Johnson. The two possess a rather delightful chemistry that is always fun to watch. A review by Simon Appleton from The Movie Mosustach said "Oregonda's intriguing (but likely, realistic) lack of hope or optimism allows the movie to keep you guessing until the very end, making it a rather engaging adventure into outer space. Filmnet gives a 4.5 out of five rating saying the use of emotion across the narrative is crucial in what allowed the high-concept sci-fi story work so effectively. It created a human element and a sense of familiarity that kept things real. This is something a lot of science fiction, especially bigger-budget projects, tends to get wrong. Indonesian film reviewer Tinton Obot from Fakta comments with from the story built by Eric Shook and Leanne Johnson, this film will be very exciting to watch.
