= James M. Amoss Building =

- U.S. National Register of Historic Places
- U.S. Historic district – Contributing property
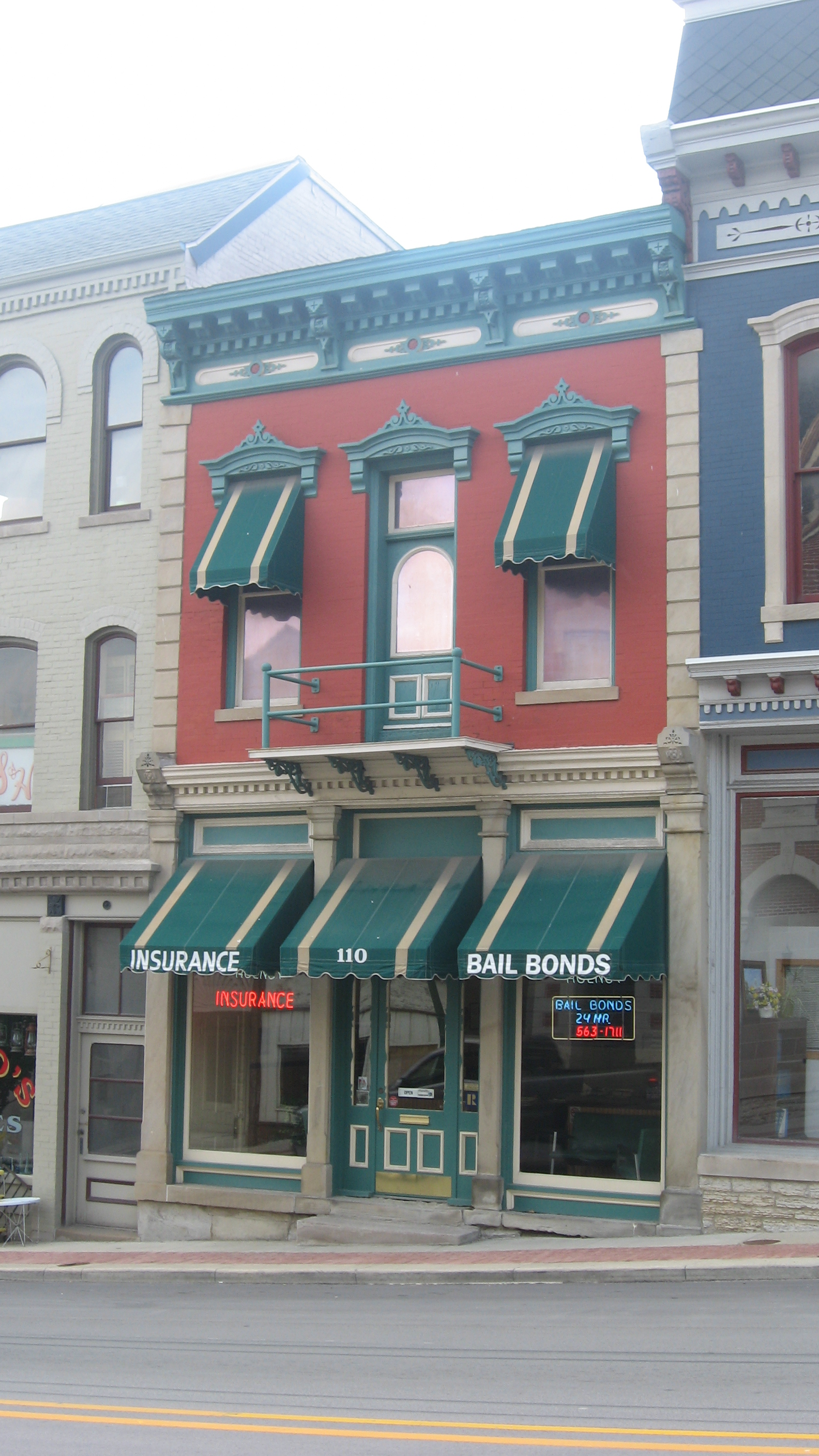
- James M. Amoss Building, May 2012

- Location within Indiana
- Location: 110 S. Wabash St., Wabash, Indiana
- Coordinates: 40°47′52″N 85°49′15″W
- Area: less than one acre
- Built: 1880
- Architectural style: Italianate
- NRHP reference No.: 84001742
- Added to NRHP: August 30, 1984

The James M. Amoss Building (also known as the Knights of Pythias Building) is a historic commercial building located at 110 Wabash Street in Wabash, Indiana.

== Description and history ==
It was constructed in 1880, and is a two-story, three bay wide, Italianate-style brick building with a limestone foundation and quoins. It features a pressed metal dentil cornice and windows framed by limestone pilasters with simple Tuscan order capitals.

It was listed on the National Register of Historic Places on August 30, 1984. It is located in the Downtown Wabash Historic District.
