= North Wabash Historic District =

Historic district in Indiana, United States

- U.S. National Register of Historic Places
- U.S. Historic district
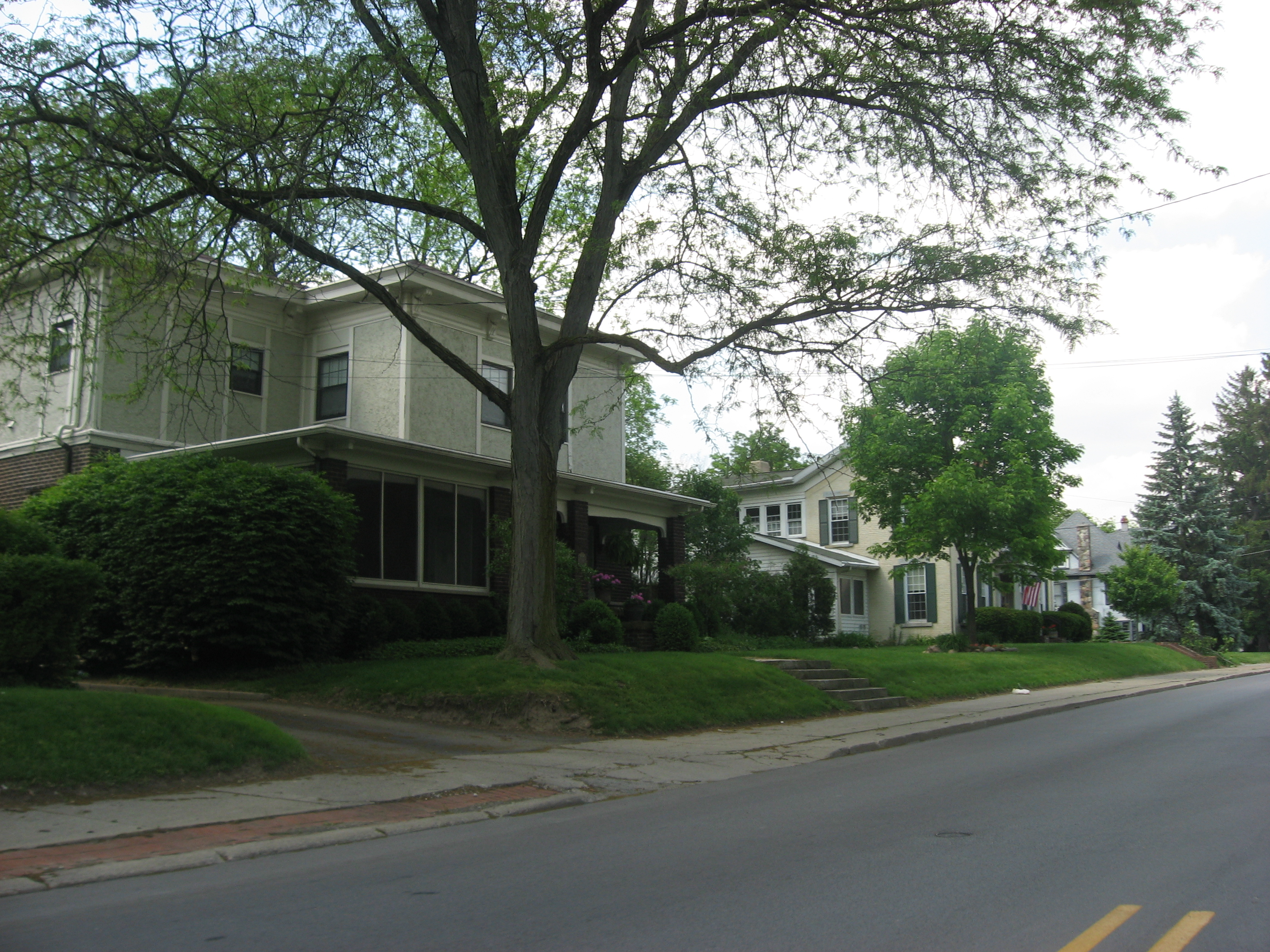
- North Wabash Historic District, May 2012

- Location within Indiana Location within the United States
- Location: Roughly bounded by W. Maple, N. Carroll, Ferry, Miami, Pawling, N. Wabash, and Union Sts., Wabash, Indiana
- Coordinates: 40°48′13″N 85°49′18″W
- Area: 45 acres (18 ha)
- Architectural style: Italianate, Queen Anne
- NRHP reference No.: 99001077
- Added to NRHP: September 3, 1999

North Wabash Historic District is a national historic district located at Wabash, Indiana. It encompasses 159 contributing buildings in a predominantly residential section of Wabash. It developed between about 1846 and 1949, and includes representative examples of Italianate, Queen Anne, Colonial Revival, and Bungalow / American Craftsman style architecture. Located in the district is the separately listed McNamee-Ford House. Other notable buildings include the John Wilson House (c. 1870), Milliner House (1890), Thomas McNamee House (c. 1900), Williams House (c. 1900), Eagle House (c. 1870), and David Kunse House (1846).

It was listed on the National Register of Historic Places in 1999.
