= Rick Brandenburg =

American entomologist

Dr. Ricky Lynn Brandenburg (born April 4, 1955, in Wabash, Indiana) is a William Neal Reynolds Professor of Distinction professor of entomology at North Carolina State University. He is a native of Indiana, and received his bachelor's degree in entomology from Purdue University in 1977 and his Ph.D. from North Carolina State University in 1981. He spent four years as a faculty member at the University of Missouri in Columbia, Missouri before accepting his current position at N. C. State in 1985.

Dr. Brandenburg's research and educational programs focus on developing a sound understanding of pest biology and ecology and the development of ecologically and environmentally sound turfgrass insect pest management programs. These programs include the use of cultural practices and biological control as well as various techniques to forecast pest outbreaks. He and N.C. State colleague and GCSAA instructor, Dr. Fred Yelverton, worked to establish the Center for Turfgrass Environmental Research and Education at N. C. State. in 2001. As co-directors of the center they have worked with the turfgrass industry to secure an initial annual funding level from state appropriations of $600,000 to support turfgrass research and education programs. Dr. Brandenburg's research program includes three technicians and numerous graduate students and focuses on the development of environmentally-sound pest management programs.

Rick has written several books and book chapters, numerous scientific articles, hundreds of trade journals articles, and is a frequent speaker at many turfgrass conferences worldwide. He has spoken on turfgrass insect management in over 30 states and in foreign countries including Australia, South Africa, Canada, Wales, Singapore, Argentina, and Indonesia, and made site visits to other countries including: Zimbabwe, Indonesia, Tunisia, Ghana, Botswana, Fiji Islands, Hong Kong, China, Mexico, and Scotland. He is frequently sought as a consultant and speaker on issues concerning insect management, environmental topics, and educating the public about pesticide use on golf courses.
