= Solomon Wilson Building =

- U.S. National Register of Historic Places
- U.S. Historic district – Contributing property
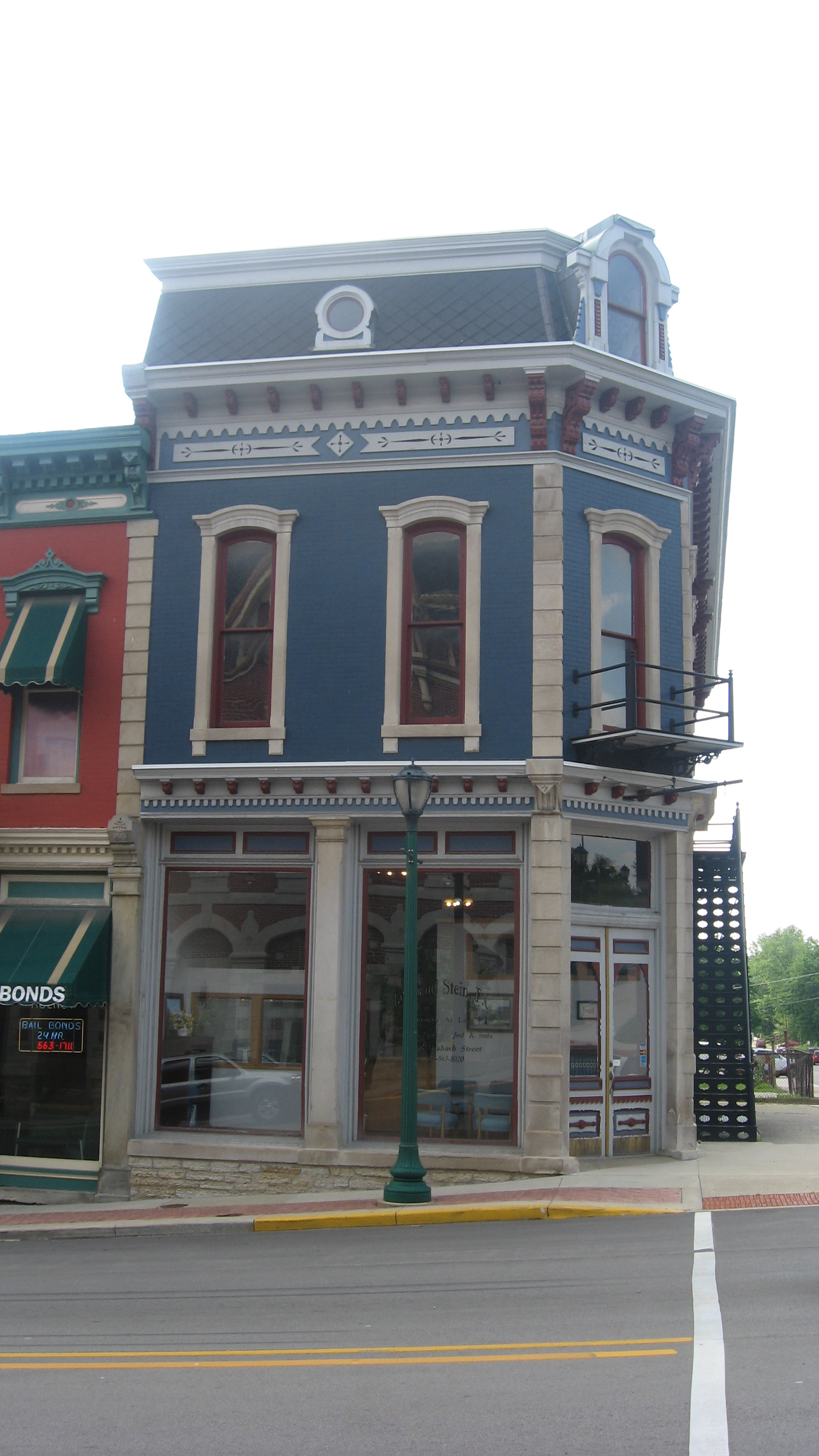
- Solomon Wilson Building, May 2012

- Location within Indiana Location within the United States
- Location: 102 S. Wabash St., Wabash, Indiana
- Coordinates: 40°47′52″N 85°49′14″W
- Area: less than one acre
- Built: 1883
- Architectural style: Second Empire
- NRHP reference No.: 84001743
- Added to NRHP: August 30, 1984

Solomon Wilson Building, also known as the Scheerer Building, is a historic commercial building located at Wabash, Indiana. It was built in 1883, and is a 2 1/2-story, two bay by seven bay, Second Empire style brick building on a stone foundation. It features a mansard roof with and elaborate dormer and a chamfered corner with a second story balcony.

It was listed on the National Register of Historic Places in 1984. It is located in the Downtown Wabash Historic District.
