= First Christian Church (Wabash, Indiana) =

Historic church in Indiana, United States

- U.S. National Register of Historic Places
- U.S. Historic district – Contributing property
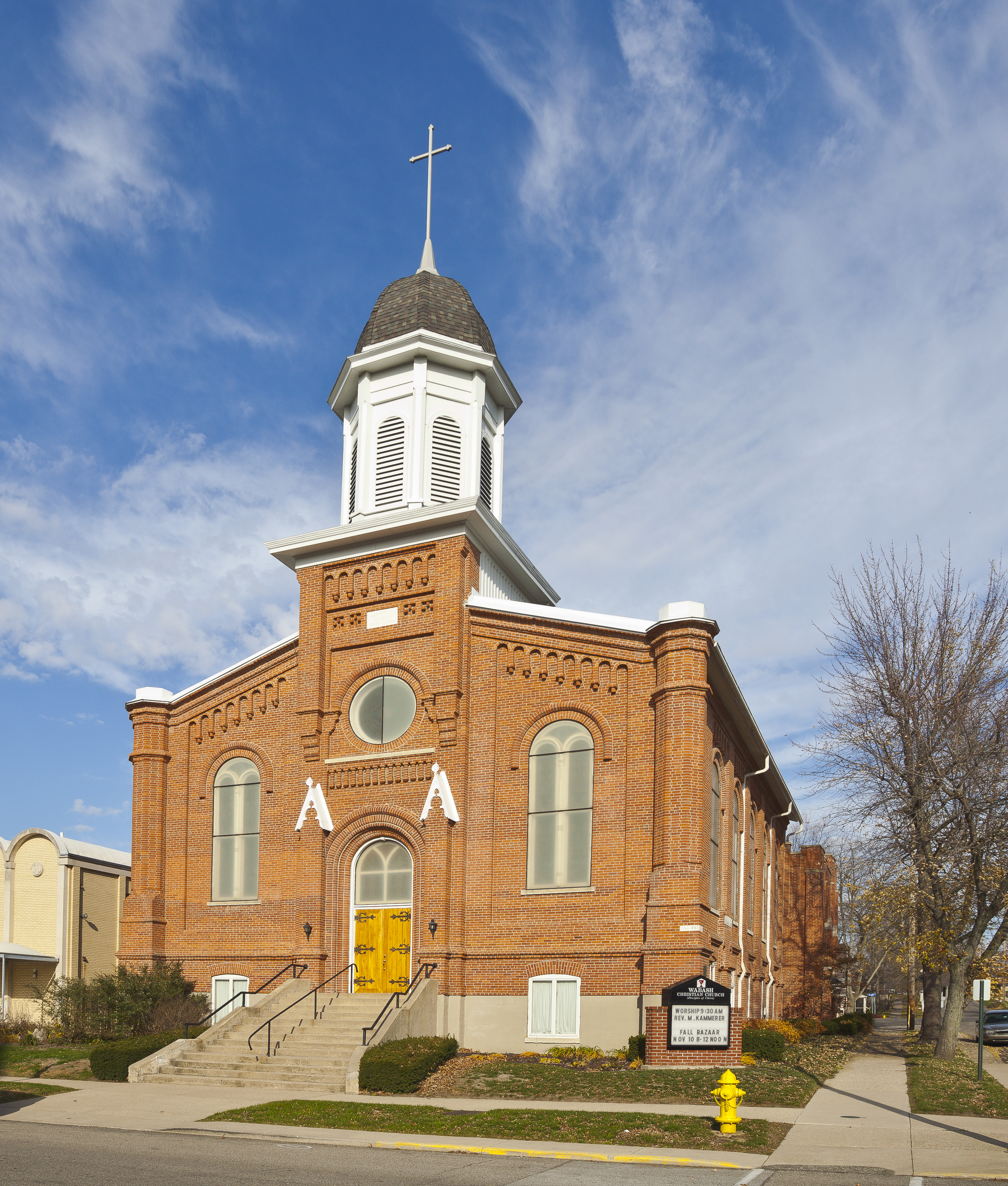
- Wabash Christian Church, November 2012

- Location within Indiana Location within the United States
- Location: 110 W. Hill St., Wabash, Indiana
- Coordinates: 40°47′56″N 85°49′22″W
- Area: less than one acre
- Built: 1865
- Architect: Ford, James
- Architectural style: Romanesque
- NRHP reference No.: 83000161
- Added to NRHP: June 23, 1983

First Christian Church, also known as the Wabash Christian Church, is a historic Disciples of Christ church located in Wabash, Indiana. It was built in 1865, and is a rectangular, brick Romanesque Revival style church. It has a gable roof and features a domed tower rising from the slightly projecting center pavilion at the front facade.

It was listed on the National Register of Historic Places in 1983. It is located in the West Wabash Historic District.
