= Michael Baber =

American music editor

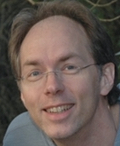
Michael Baber in 2010

Michael Baber (born 1966) is an American freelance music editor who has worked on several popular American TV shows.

Baber contributed to the soundtracks of Mighty Morphin Power Rangers (1995), Battlestar Galactica (2004), Once Upon a Time (2011), Black Mirror (2011), The Walking Dead (2010), Black Sails (2014), as well as more television shows and films.

Baber has won three Emmy awards for outstanding sound editing for a series. His contributions to the shows Battlestar Galactica and Black Sails earned him these awards in 2009, 2014, and 2016, the most recent of the two awarded for Black Sails.

Baber has been married to Claire Bloom since 1999, and has had three children with her, with whom he lives in Woodland Hills, California. These include daughters Zoe and Natalie, as well as his son Calvin.

== Biography ==
Born in Wabash, Indiana on November 1, 1966, Baber attended Indiana University in Bloomington, Indiana from 1985 to 1989. He earned a Bachelor of Science degree in Telecommunications and TV production. He eventually attended USC for graduate school from 1989 to 1993, graduating with a MFA in sound editing, film writing, and recording.

Baber's first credited role in film is as an assistant engineer for 12 episodes of the Mighty Morphin Power Rangers in 1995. At this point in time, Baber met Bloom while both were working on the television show Strange Luck and the two married in 1999. Their first child, a daughter named Natalie, was born in 2000. He continued working as a music editor, founding Bloombaber Music Design Inc. in 2004 alongside his wife, a musician of her own and executive director of the Tarzana Community Center. Their second daughter, Zoe, was born in 2003. In 2006, they had their only son, Calvin.

Baber was hired as a music editor for Battlestar Galactica (2004) between 2005 and 2009. For this, he earned an Emmy Award at the 61st Primetime Emmy Awards. Later on, his contributions to Black Sails (2014) between 2014 and 2016 earned him two more Emmy Awards, at the 66th and 68th Primetime Emmy Awards, respectively. He is still working as a music editor, most notably for The Walking Dead between 2010 and 2019. He was nominated for an Emmy Award four times for his work on the show, but has never won.
