= Downtown Wabash Historic District =

Historic district in Indiana, United States

- U.S. National Register of Historic Places
- U.S. Historic district
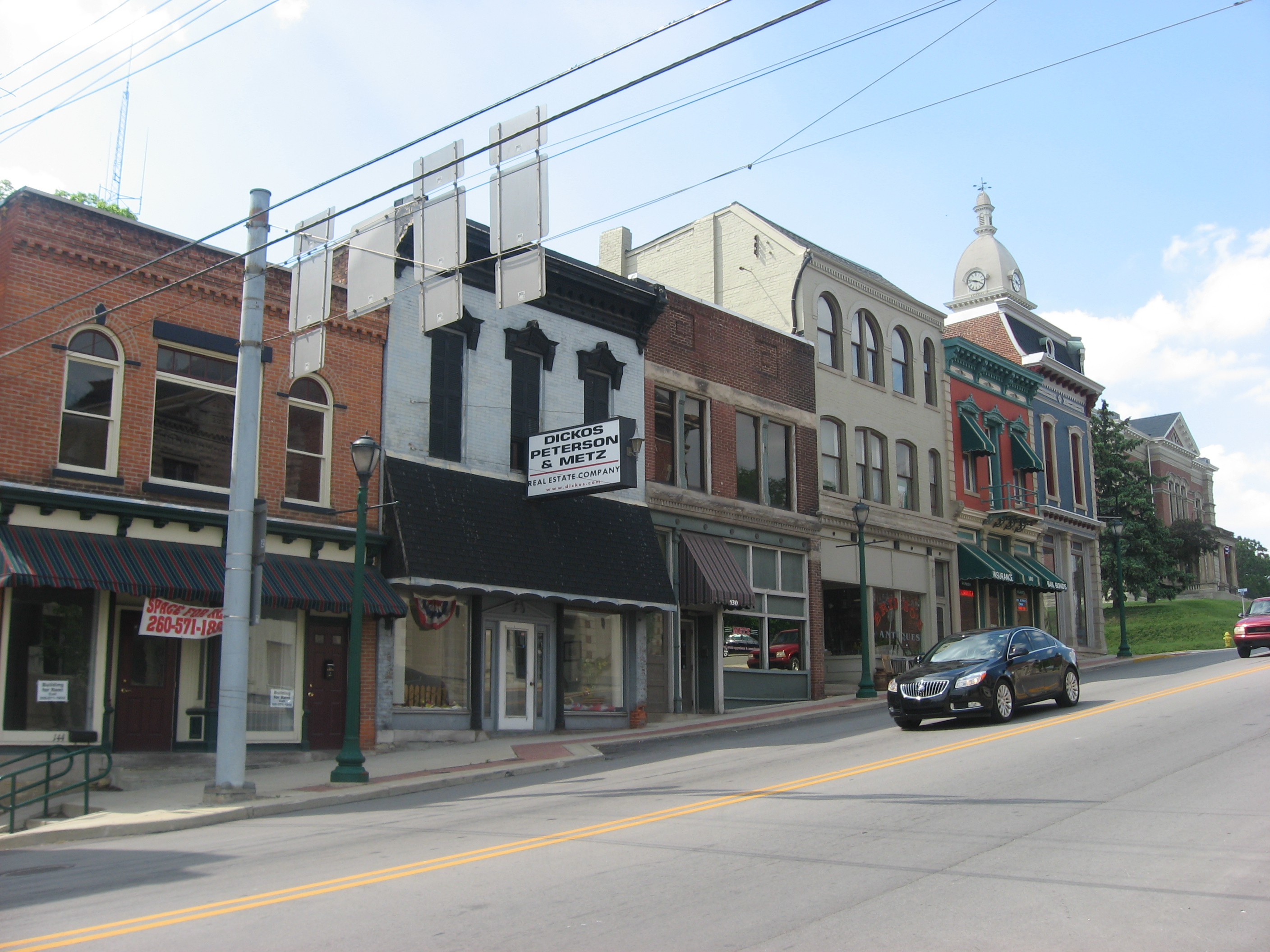
- Streetside on Wabash, May 2012

- Location within Indiana Location within the United States
- Location: Roughly bounded by Hill, Wabash, Canal, and Miami Sts., Wabash, Indiana
- Coordinates: 40°47′50″N 85°49′17″W
- Area: 17 acres (6.9 ha)
- Built: 1840
- Architect: Johnson, Arland W.; Et al.
- Architectural style: Second Empire, Italianate, Romanesque
- NRHP reference No.: 86001678
- Added to NRHP: July 18, 1986

Downtown Wabash Historic District, also known as the Wabash Marketplace District, is a national historic district located at Wabash, Indiana. It encompasses 27 contributing buildings in the central business district of Wabash. It developed between about 1840 and 1920, and includes representative examples of Italianate, Romanesque Revival, and Second Empire style architecture. Located in the district are the separately listed James M. Amoss Building and Solomon Wilson Building. Other notable buildings include the E.M. Conner Building (1897), Back Saddlery and Harness Shop (1845), Wabash Loan and Trust Company (1927), Bradley Block (1901), Busick Block (1882), Eagles Building (1906), the Plain Dealer Building (1897), S.J. Payne Block (1898), J.C. Penney's (1920), National Block (1876), Sheriff's House and Jail (1879), Memorial Hall (1899), U.S. Post Office (1911–1912), Wabash County Courthouse (1878), Shively Block (1897), and Wabash City Hall (1883–1884).

It was listed on the National Register of Historic Places in 1986.
