= Honeywell Center =

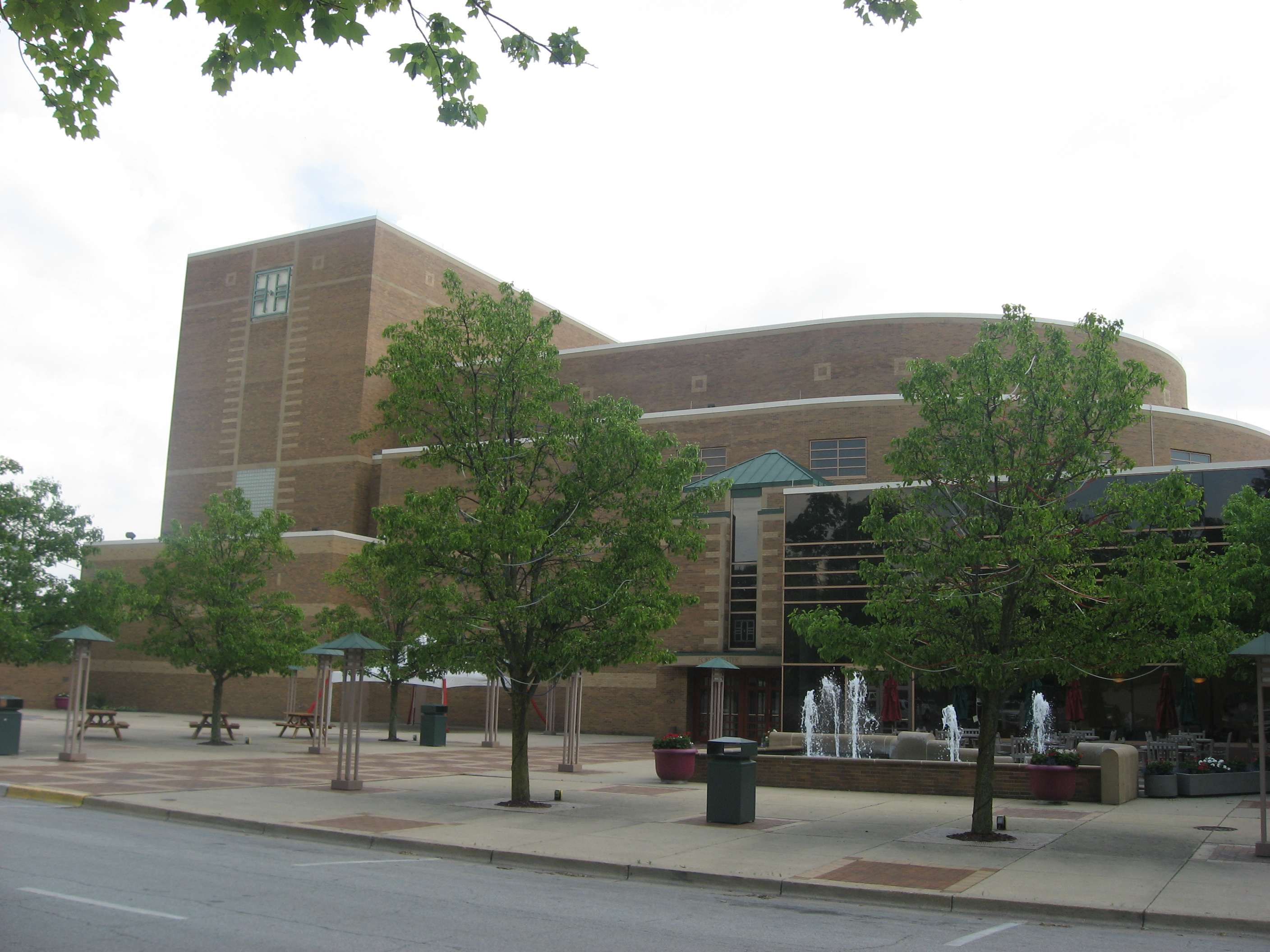
- North facade of the building
- Interactive map of Honeywell Center
- Address: 275 W. Market St. Wabash, Indiana; United States
- Owner: Honeywell Foundation
- Capacity: Ford Theater: 1,500

Construction
- Opened: 1952
- Rebuilt: 1994

Website
- www.honeywellcenter.org
- Honeywell Memorial Community Center
- U.S. National Register of Historic Places
- Location within Indiana Location within the United States
- Coordinates: 40°47′45.46″N 85°49′30.3″W
- Built: 1940
- Architect: Strauss, A. M.
- NRHP reference No.: 83000042
- Added to NRHP: July 15, 1983

The Honeywell Center in downtown Wabash, Indiana, United States, is located 47 miles (76 km) southwest of Fort Wayne. It is a block-long arts complex featuring the Ford Theater, Clark Gallery, and Eugenia's Restaurant. The Ford Theater presents Broadway, rock, country, classical, and comedy performances.

The Honeywell Center is operated by The Honeywell Foundation, Inc. which was established in 1941 by Wabash native Mark C. Honeywell - a developer of the thermostat and automatic controls for heating systems.

Construction of the 45,000-square-foot (4,200 m^{2}) center began in 1940 but was delayed until 1952 due to the shortage of labor and materials caused by World War II. The center's gymnasium informally opened November 19, 1947; however, the entire facility was completed in 1952 and included a roller rink and several meeting spaces.

In 1994, a 75,000-square-foot (7,000 m^{2}) addition expanded the Honeywell Center to include the 1,500-seat Ford Theater, Eugenia's Restaurant and an art gallery. The center has 14 rooms which are available for gatherings between eight and 1,500 people.

The center was listed on the National Register of Historic Places in 1983.
