= Paradise Spring Treaty Grounds =

Paradise Spring Treaty Grounds and Historical Park is located on the corner of Allen and Market streets in Wabash, Indiana. Erected 1992 Indiana Historical Bureau and Wabash County Tourism.

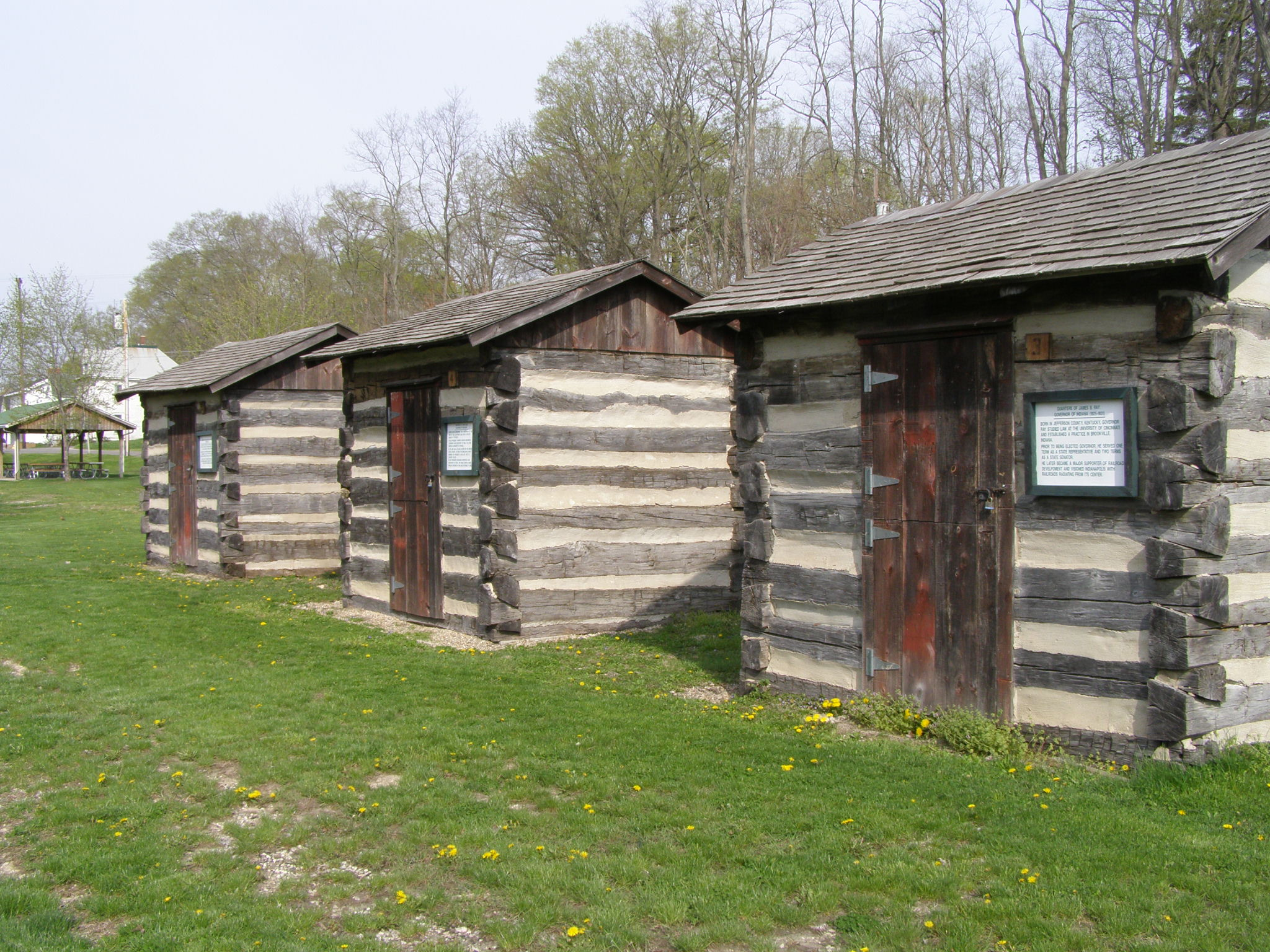
Paradise Springs In Wabash Indiana

== History ==
In October 1826, Potawatomi and Miami tribes signed treaties with the United States including the Treaty of Mississinewa ceding lands north of the Wabash River. The treaties included provisions for land for further white settlement including a canal and the Michigan Road.
