= East Wabash Historic District =

Historic district in Indiana, United States

- U.S. National Register of Historic Places
- U.S. Historic district
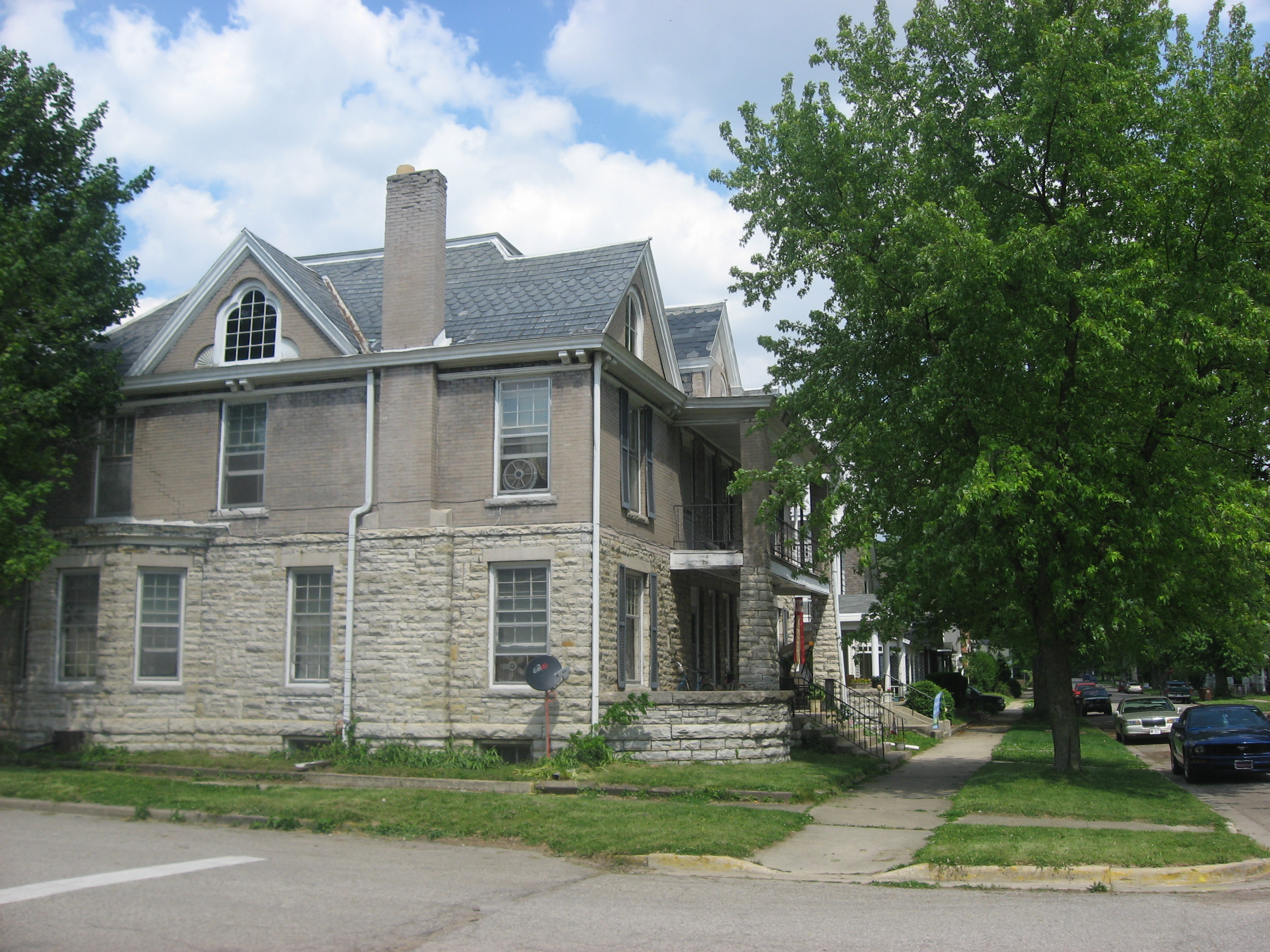
- East Wabash Historic District, May 2012

- Location within Indiana Location within the United States
- Location: Roughly bounded by Walnut, E. Market, N. Wabash, and S. East Sts., Wabash, Indiana
- Coordinates: 40°47′56″N 85°49′04″W
- Area: 185 acres (75 ha)
- Architectural style: Federal, Italianate, Second Empire, Queen Anne, Colonial Revival, Bungalow/Craftsman
- NRHP reference No.: 11000390
- Added to NRHP: June 23, 2011

East Wabash Historic District is a national historic district located at Wabash, Indiana. It encompasses 204 contributing buildings in a predominantly residential section of Wabash. It developed between about 1850 and 1930, and includes representative examples of Federal, Italianate, Second Empire, Queen Anne, Colonial Revival, and Bungalow / American Craftsman style architecture. Notable buildings include the George and Sophie Lumaree House (c. 1880), Treaty Stone and Lime Company (1887), Grandstaff Hentgen Funeral Service, James D. Conner House (c. 1860), Cowgill House (c. 1880), Kaiser Hotel (c. 1887), C.W. Cowgill House (1850), and St. Matthew's Evangelical and Reformed Church (1862, 1879).

It was listed on the National Register of Historic Places in 2011.
