= McNamee-Ford House =

Historic house in Indiana, United States

- U.S. National Register of Historic Places
- U.S. Historic district – Contributing property
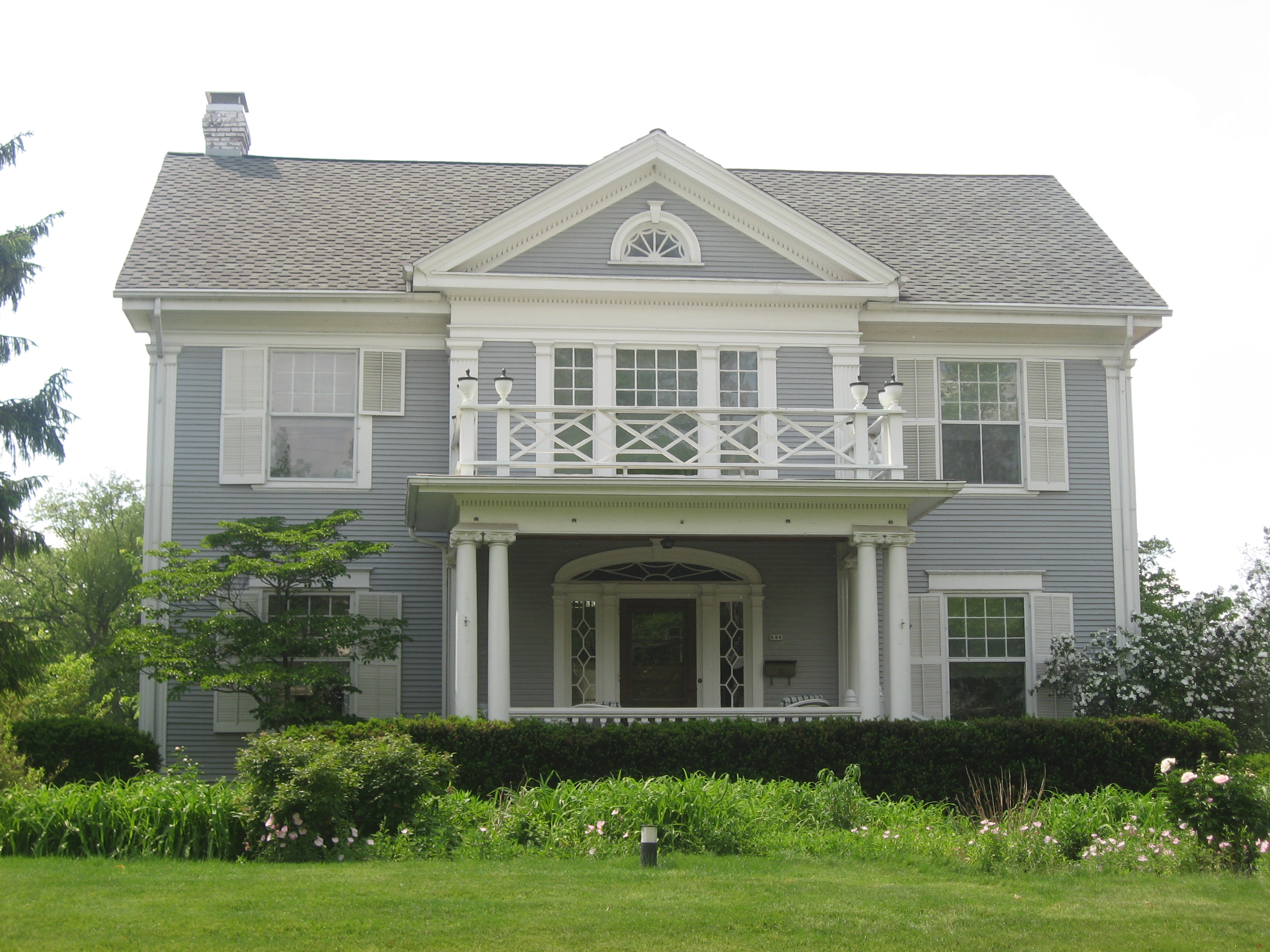
- McNamee-Ford House, May 2012

- Location within Indiana Location within the United States
- Location: 536 N. Wabash St., Wabash, Indiana
- Coordinates: 40°48′20″N 85°49′16″W
- Area: less than one acre
- Built: 1901
- Architectural style: Colonial Revival
- NRHP reference No.: 95000199
- Added to NRHP: March 3, 1995

McNamee-Ford House is a historic home located at Wabash, Indiana. It was built in 1901, and is a two-story, Colonial Revival style frame dwelling with a two-story service wing. It has a side-gable roof and is sheathed in clapboard siding. The front facade features a central projecting pavilion, front porch supported by Ionic order columns, and second story tripartite window.

It was listed on the National Register of Historic Places in 1995. It is located in the North Wabash Historic District.
