= The Ford Meter Box Company =

The Ford Meter Box Company, Inc.
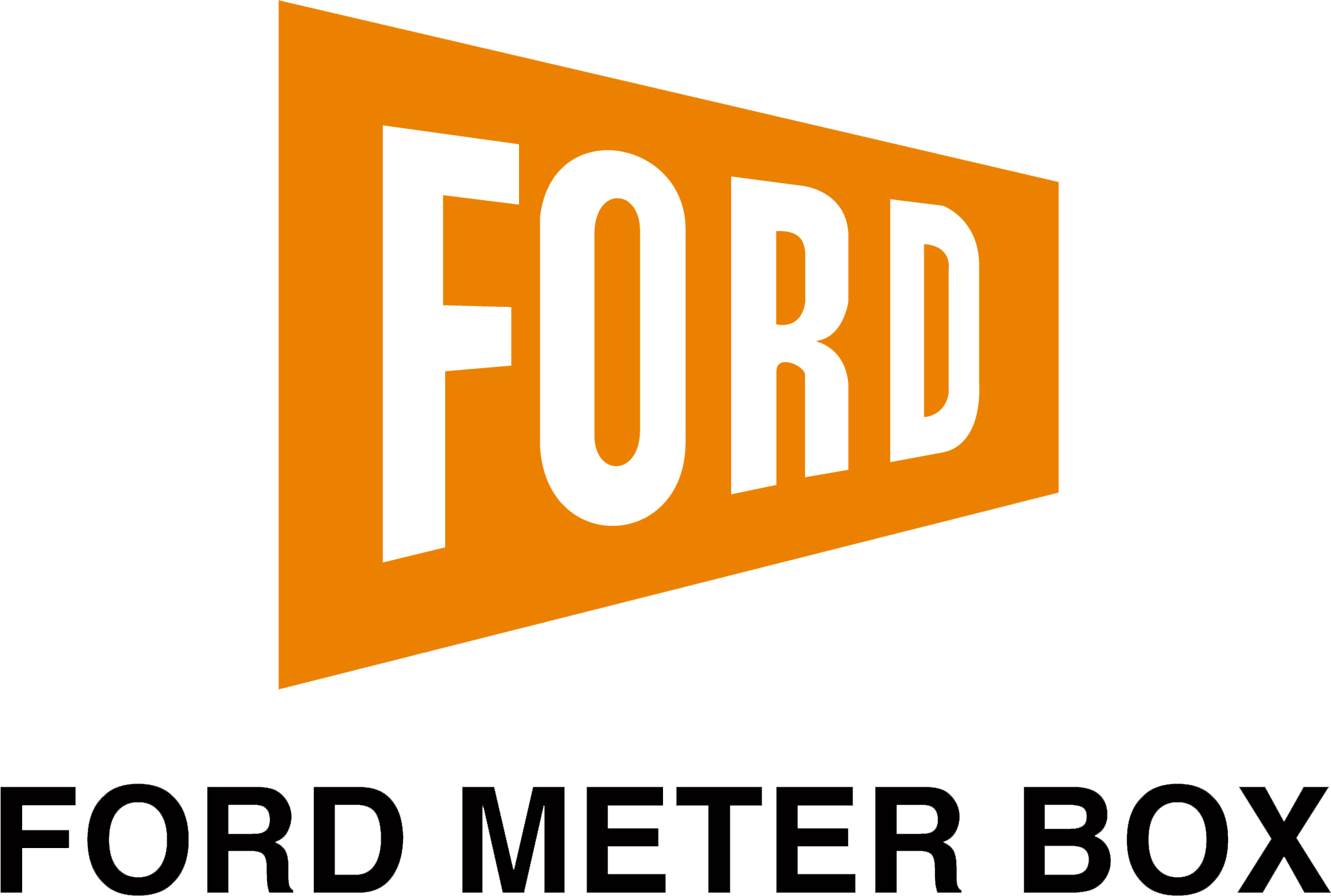

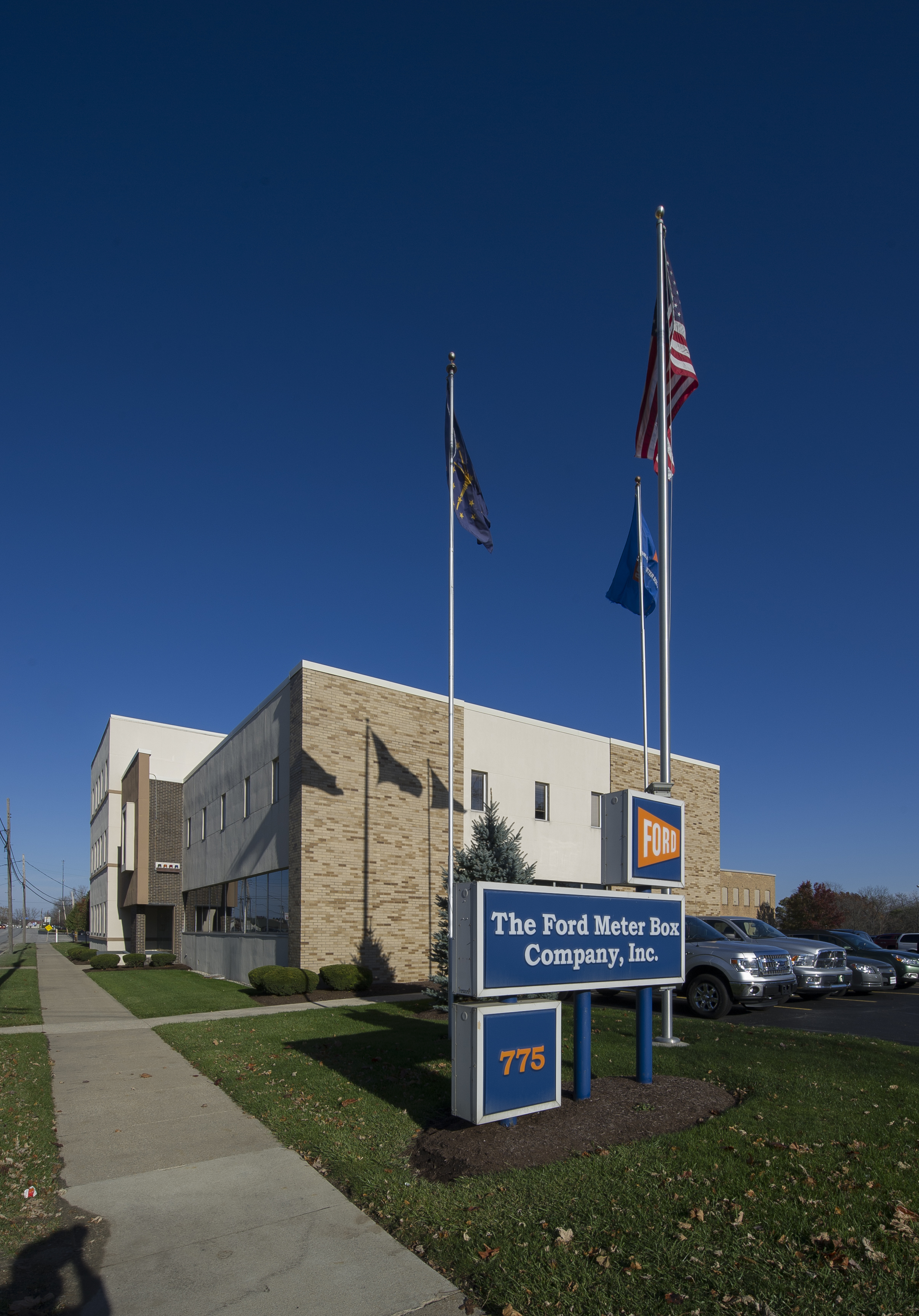
- Ford Meter Box headquarters in Wabash, IN
- Type: Privately held company
- Industry: Water Infrastructure
- Founded: December 21, 1898
- Founder: Edwin Ford
- Headquarters: Wabash, IN
- Number of employees: 500-1000
- Website: www.fordmeterbox.com

The Ford Meter Box Company is a manufacturer of products for the waterworks industry and is headquartered in Wabash, Indiana, where it operates a brass foundry. Its products include water meter setting and testing equipment, valves, couplings, meter boxes, and other fittings. It also has a plant in Pell City, Alabama, where it manufactures products such as pipe tapping sleeves, repair clamps, and pipe restraints. Ford's products are sold through a network of distributors in North America and via various channels around the world.

== History ==
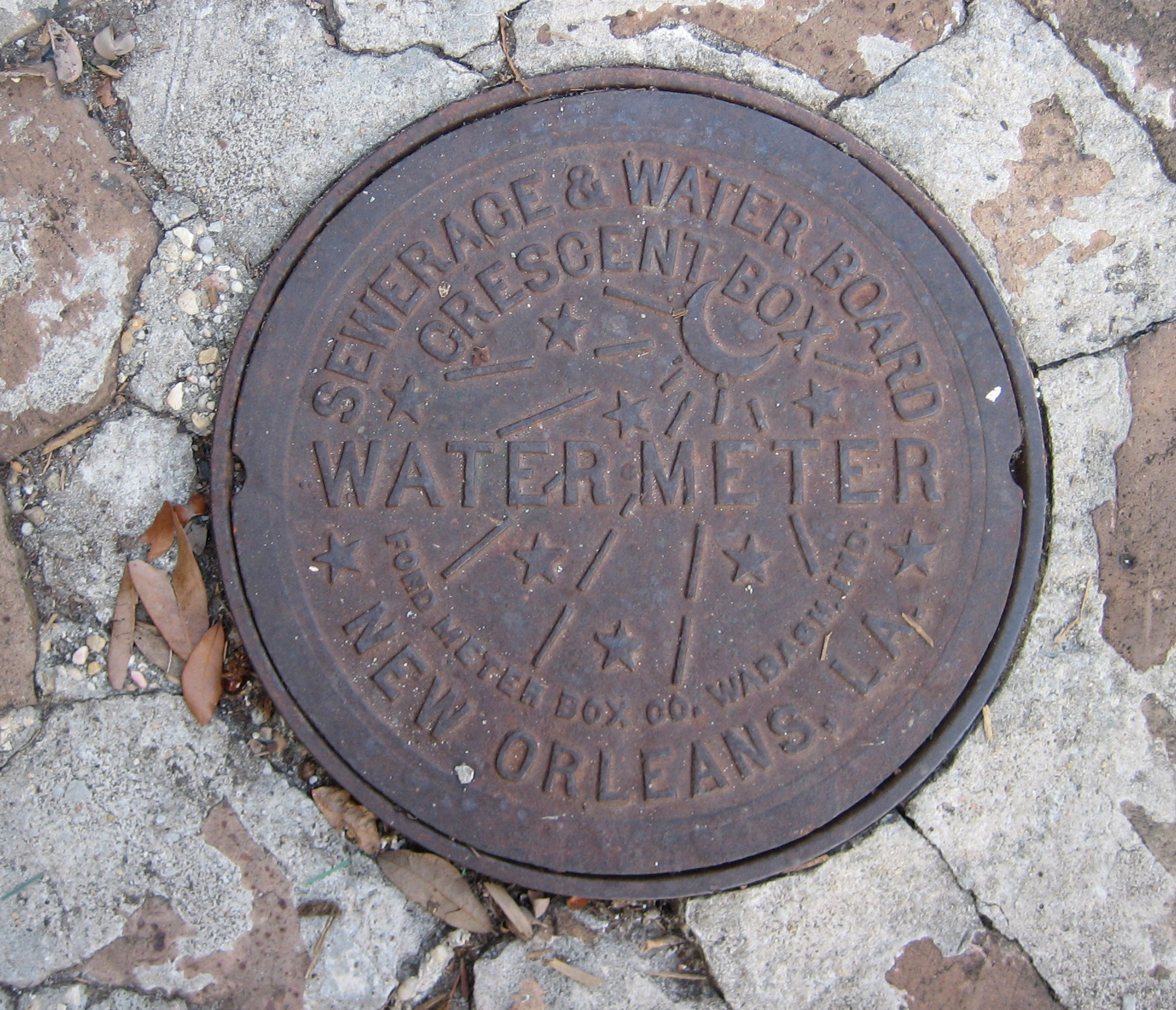
Meter box cover manufactured by Ford Meter Box for New Orleans

Ford Meter Box was founded by Edwin Ford in Hartford City, Indiana in 1898. He invented the meter box as a place to install water meters outside of homes that did not have basements. Ford's early experimentation found that meters could be installed in pits to protect them from freezing. His revolutionary invention was granted a patent on September 19, 1899.

In 1911, Edwin moved the company to Wabash, Indiana, and The Ford Meter Box Company was incorporated. After moving to Wabash, Ford Meter Box expanded its product offerings, and in 1916, Ford Meter Box received its first patent for the water meter test bench. The firm also began manufacturing meter-setting products for a variety of installation settings.

In the early 1960s, Ford Meter Box introduced the ball valve for waterworks applications. In 1972, Ford began marketing stainless steel repair clamps. In 1994, Ford Meter Box acquired the Uni-Flange brand and began manufacturing pipe restraints.
