= West Wabash Historic District =

Historic district in Indiana, United States

- U.S. National Register of Historic Places
- U.S. Historic district
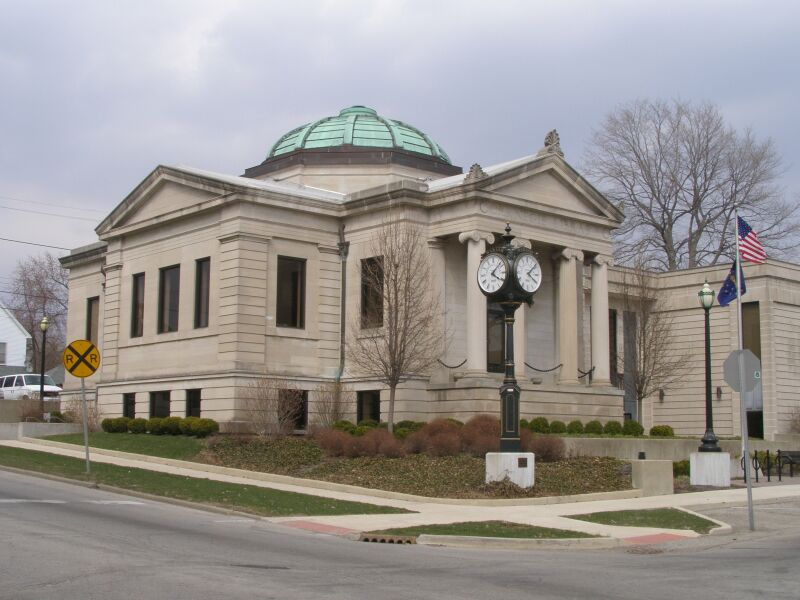
- Carnegie Library of Wabash, April 2011

- Location within Indiana Location within the United States
- Location: Bounded roughly by the Northfolk Southern RR and Union St., Wabash and Miami Sts., Main St., Holliday St., Wabash, Indiana
- Coordinates: 40°47′54″N 85°49′28″W
- Area: 66 acres (27 ha)
- Architect: Wing & Mahurin; Et al.
- Architectural style: Late 19th And Early 20th Century American Movements, Late 19th And 20th Century Revivals, Late Victorian
- NRHP reference No.: 88000447
- Added to NRHP: April 21, 1988

West Wabash Historic District is a national historic district located at Wabash, Indiana. It comprises 283 buildings in a predominantly residential section of Wabash. It developed between about 1840 and 1930, and includes representative examples of Federal, Italianate, Romanesque Revival, and Colonial Revival style architecture.

Located in the district is the separately listed First Christian Church. Other notable buildings include the Jackson Family House (c. 1850), John and Lucinda Sivey House (late 1850s), Thomas and Hannah Whiteside House (1881), Matlock-Barnhart House (1866–1867), Alexander and Millicent Hill House (1892, by Wing & Mahurin), David and Sadie Cohen House (1909), Bennett E. Davis House (1842), Presbyterian Church (1881), Wabash Carnegie Public Library (1903, by Wing & Mahurin), and Wabash High School (1894, by Wing & Mahurin).

It was listed on the National Register of Historic Places in 1988.
