= Eagles Theatre =

The Eagles Theatre is a movie theater and mixed-use venue at 106 W Market Street in the US city of Wabash, Indiana.

== History ==
The building was constructed by the Fraternal Order of Eagles from 1905, and opened in 1906. The four-story building featured a large first-floor auditorium (used initially for vaudeville theater), meeting rooms, offices, and the order's meeting hall. The auditorium was subsequently converted into a movie theater. It was remodelled by architect Alvin M. Strauss in the 1920s, and again by Strauss in 1939, when it was converted to the Art Deco style.

The Eagles boasts one of the largest screens remaining in Indiana, has two balconies and a ballroom. The building was added to the National Register of Historic Places in 1985.

In 2010 the theater was acquired by the Honeywell Foundation, operators of Wabash's Honeywell Center. In 2017 the building closed for nearly three years, for an extensive $16 million renovation. Prior to this, the building had fallen into poor condition, with the balconies and upper-story rooms dilapidated and closed due to safety concerns.
