= Wabash, Indiana =

- City
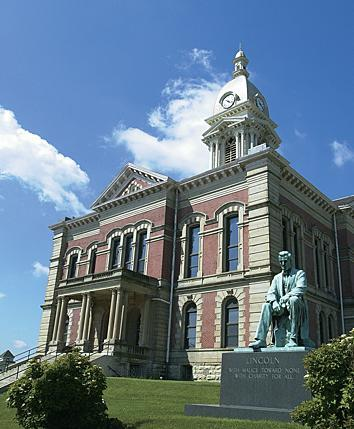
- Wabash County Courthouse with Lincoln Monument

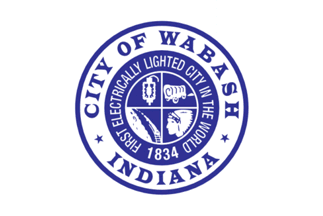
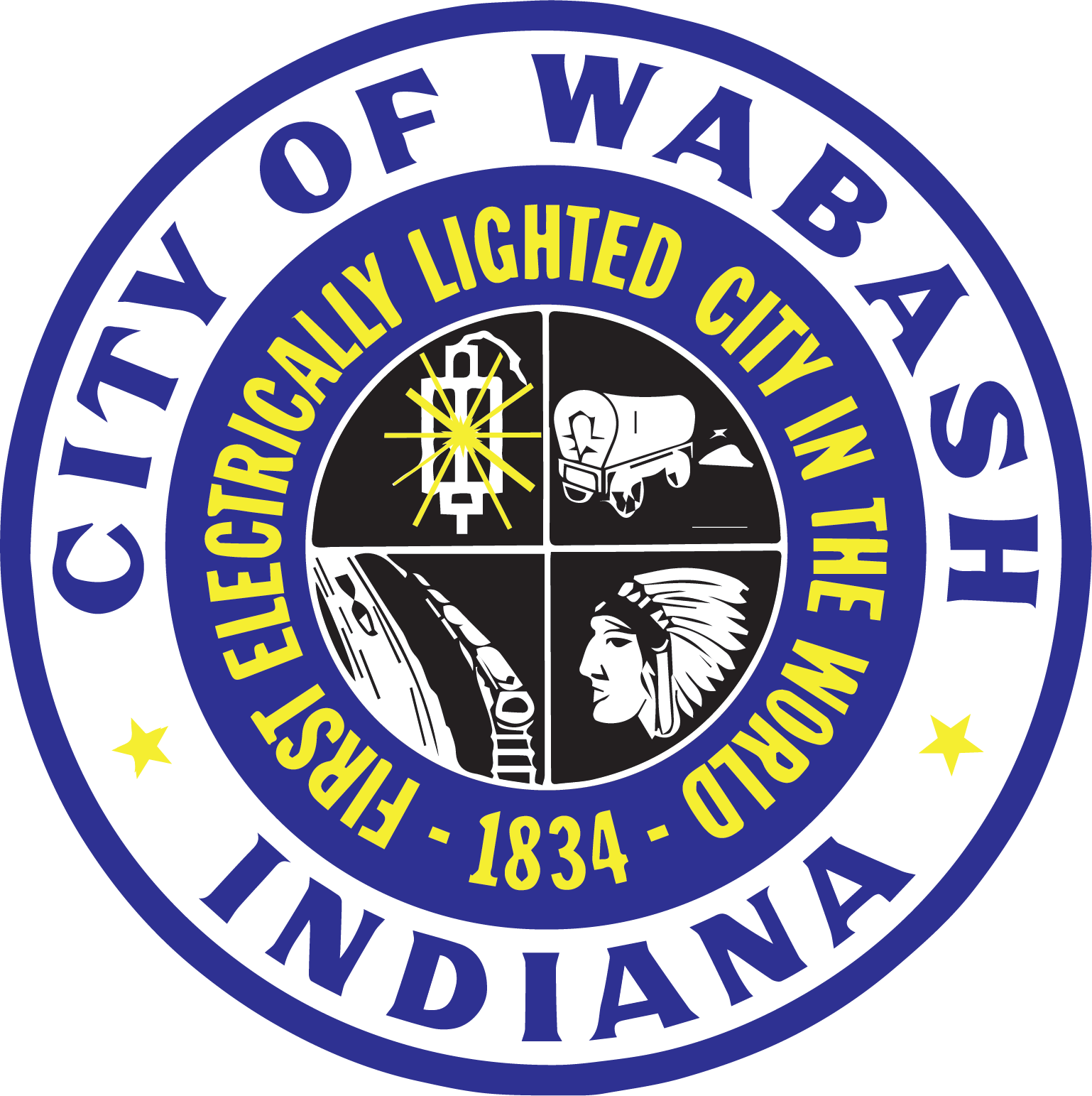
- Flag Seal

- Location of Wabash in Wabash County, Indiana
- Coordinates: 40°48′03″N 85°49′38″W
- Country: United States
- State: Indiana
- County: Wabash
- Township: Noble

Government
  - Type: Mayor-council government
  - Mayor: Scott Long (R), 2016-Present
  - City Manager: Larry Faust

Area
  - Total: 9.87 sq mi (25.57 km^{2})
  - Land: 9.64 sq mi (24.96 km^{2})
  - Water: 0.24 sq mi (0.62 km^{2}) 2.63%
- Elevation: 751 ft (229 m)

Population (2020)
  - Total: 10,440
  - Density: 1,083.5/sq mi (418.33/km^{2})
- Time zone: UTC-5 (EST)
- ZIP code: 46992
- Area code: 260
- FIPS code: 18-79370
- GNIS feature ID: 2397155
- Website: www.cityofwabash.com

Wabash is a city in Noble Township, Wabash County, Indiana, United States. As of the 2020 census, Wabash had a population of 10,440. The city is situated along the Wabash River and is the county seat of Wabash County.

Wabash is notable as claiming to be the first electrically lighted city in the world, which was inaugurated on March 31, 1880. However, closer inspection of the reference shows only the court house grounds were lighted. It is also home to the historic Eagles Theatre, Paradise Spring Treaty Grounds (1826), the Wabash and Erie Canal, Presbyterian Church (1880), and Disciples of Christ Christian Church (1865).

== Etymology ==
The name Wabash derives from a Miami-Illinois term for "water over white stones." The Miami name reflected the clarity of the river in Huntington County, Indiana, where the river bottom is limestone.

== History ==
The first settlers to arrive in Wabash was in 1829 as a result of the treaty of Paradise Spring. The town of Wabash was platted in the spring of 1834 by Col. Hugh Hanna and Col. David Burr. The community was designated as the county seat, and it was incorporated in 1834. The town prospered due to its proximity to the Wabash and Erie Canal. In 1870 the Wabash County Courthouse and most of downtown was destroyed in a fire. However, the resilience of the city led Wabash to recover. The construction of the Big Four Railway brought even more growth to the small town but led to the neglect of the canal.

Wabash used a new type of carbon arc light invented by Charles Brush in 1870. On March 31, 1880, four 3,000-candle power lamps were suspended from the top of the courthouse. Two telegraph wires ran from the lamps to the courthouse basement, where they were connected to a generator powered by a 12-horsepower steam engine to provide power

The James M. Amoss Building, Downtown Wabash Historic District, East Wabash Historic District, First Christian Church, Honeywell Memorial Community Center, Honeywell Studio, McNamee-Ford House, North Wabash Historic District, West Wabash Historic District, and Solomon Wilson Building are listed on the National Register of Historic Places.

=== Media ===
The Wabash Free Trader was published in Wabash from 1871 to 1876. The Wabash Weekly Courier was published from 1876 until 1887.

== Geography ==
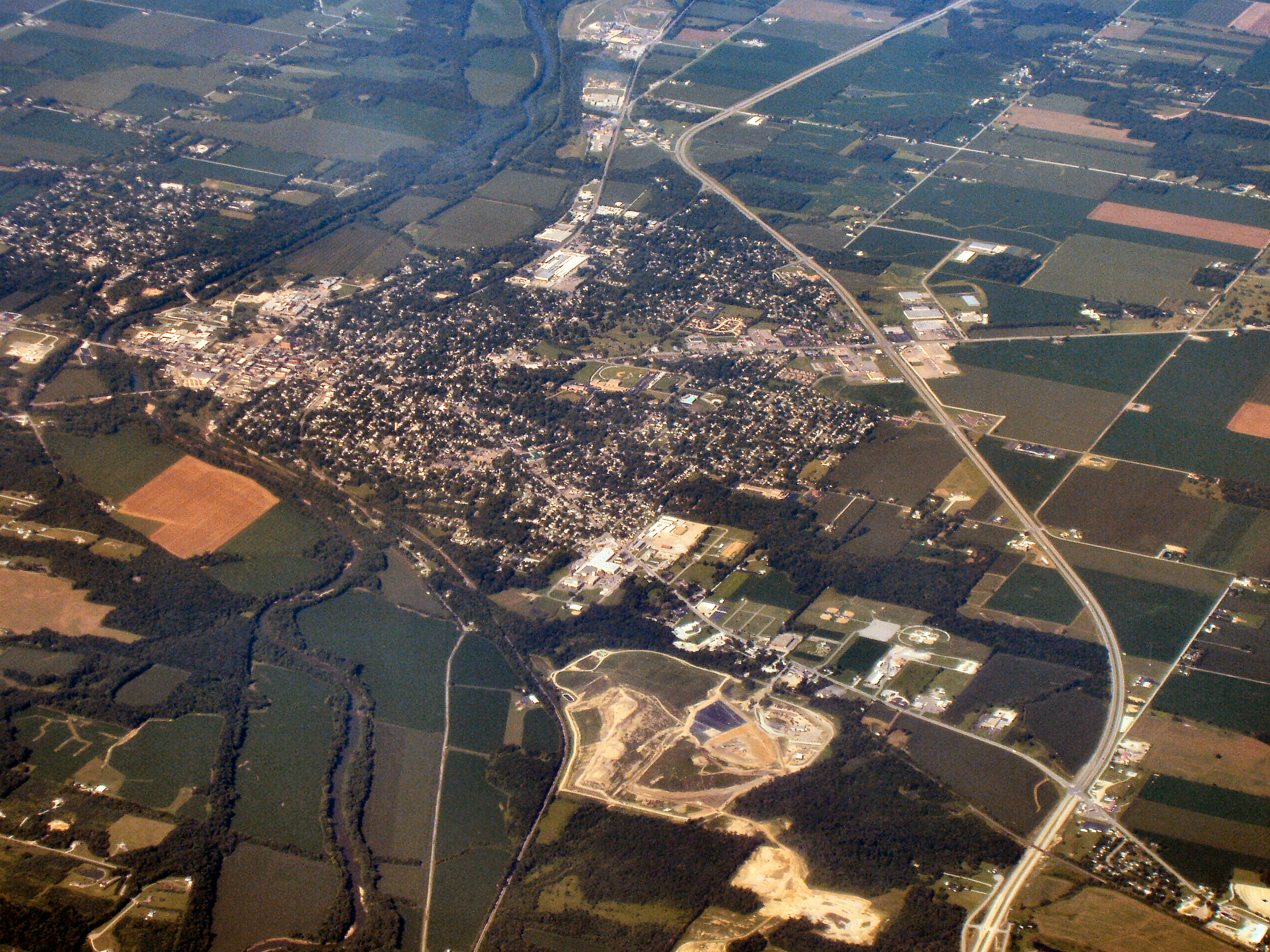
Wabash from the air, looking west.

The Wabash River runs through the town, on its way towards Peru, where it splits creating a series of islands, and where the sandbars are quite common on this stretch.

According to the 2010 census, Wabash has a total area of 9.128 square miles (23.64 km^{2}), of which 8.89 square miles (23.02 km^{2}) (or 97.39%) is land and 0.238 square miles (0.62 km^{2}) (or 2.61%) is water.

=== Climate ===
Climate data for Wabash, Indiana, 1991–2020 normals, extremes 1925–present
Month	Jan	Feb	Mar	Apr	May	Jun	Jul	Aug	Sep	Oct	Nov	Dec	Year
Record high °F (°C)	70 (21)	74 (23)	82 (28)	91 (33)	98 (37)	104 (40)	109 (43)	103 (39)	102 (39)	92 (33)	86 (30)	70 (21)	109 (43)
Mean maximum °F (°C)	55.3 (12.9)	59.0 (15.0)	71.3 (21.8)	80.6 (27.0)	87.7 (30.9)	92.2 (33.4)	92.1 (33.4)	91.2 (32.9)	89.9 (32.2)	83.3 (28.5)	69.0 (20.6)	57.5 (14.2)	94.1 (34.5)
Mean daily maximum °F (°C)	33.8 (1.0)	38.0 (3.3)	48.9 (9.4)	61.9 (16.6)	73.1 (22.8)	81.6 (27.6)	84.8 (29.3)	83.0 (28.3)	77.6 (25.3)	65.5 (18.6)	51.0 (10.6)	38.4 (3.6)	61.5 (16.4)
Daily mean °F (°C)	25.9 (−3.4)	29.2 (−1.6)	39.1 (3.9)	50.7 (10.4)	62.0 (16.7)	71.0 (21.7)	74.2 (23.4)	72.4 (22.4)	66.0 (18.9)	54.3 (12.4)	41.7 (5.4)	30.9 (−0.6)	51.5 (10.8)
Mean daily minimum °F (°C)	17.9 (−7.8)	20.3 (−6.5)	29.2 (−1.6)	39.6 (4.2)	50.9 (10.5)	60.5 (15.8)	63.6 (17.6)	61.7 (16.5)	54.4 (12.4)	43.1 (6.2)	32.5 (0.3)	23.5 (−4.7)	41.4 (5.2)
Mean minimum °F (°C)	−3.8 (−19.9)	0.9 (−17.3)	10.6 (−11.9)	23.4 (−4.8)	34.5 (1.4)	45.2 (7.3)	51.7 (10.9)	50.6 (10.3)	39.8 (4.3)	29.0 (−1.7)	18.4 (−7.6)	4.2 (−15.4)	−7.7 (−22.1)
Record low °F (°C)	−24 (−31)	−22 (−30)	−13 (−25)	4 (−16)	23 (−5)	30 (−1)	41 (5)	34 (1)	25 (−4)	16 (−9)	−3 (−19)	−21 (−29)	−24 (−31)
Average precipitation inches (mm)	2.41 (61)	2.25 (57)	2.63 (67)	3.54 (90)	4.36 (111)	4.88 (124)	4.56 (116)	4.20 (107)	3.20 (81)	3.06 (78)	2.91 (74)	2.34 (59)	40.34 (1,025)
Average snowfall inches (cm)	7.3 (19)	4.8 (12)	2.4 (6.1)	0.4 (1.0)	0.0 (0.0)	0.0 (0.0)	0.0 (0.0)	0.0 (0.0)	0.0 (0.0)	0.0 (0.0)	1.0 (2.5)	3.6 (9.1)	19.5 (49.7)
Average precipitation days (≥ 0.01 in)	9.4	7.7	9.7	10.8	12.3	12.2	10.0	8.7	8.7	9.1	9.7	8.9	117.2
Average snowy days (≥ 0.1 in)	4.3	2.4	1.4	0.2	0.0	0.0	0.0	0.0	0.0	0.0	0.6	2.2	11.1
Source 1: NOAA
Source 2: National Weather Service

== Demographics ==
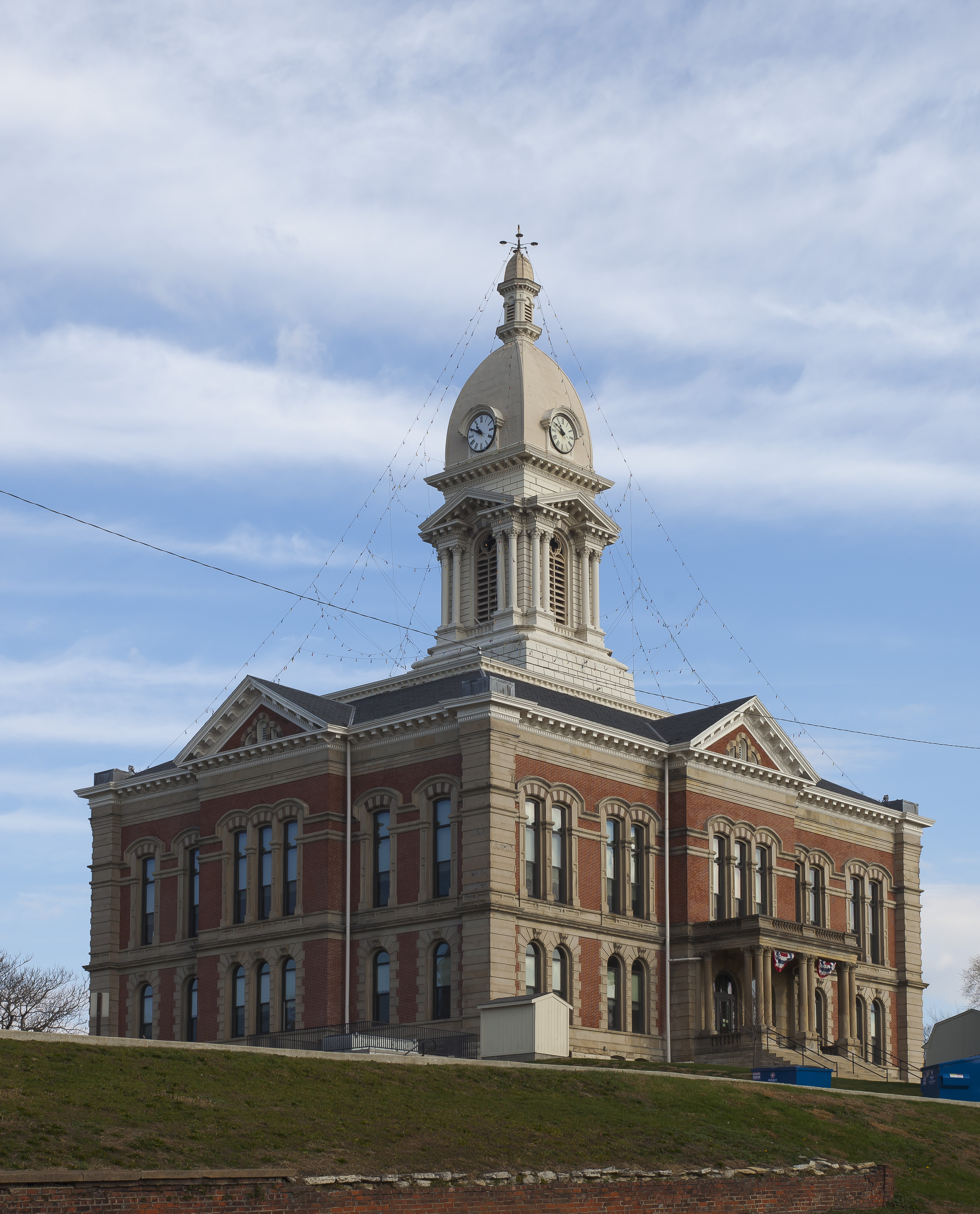
Wabash County Courthouse

=== 2020 census ===
As of the 2020 census, Wabash had a population of 10,440. The median age was 42.8 years. 21.5% of residents were under the age of 18 and 22.4% of residents were 65 years of age or older. For every 100 females there were 93.0 males, and for every 100 females age 18 and over there were 90.2 males age 18 and over.

98.0% of residents lived in urban areas, while 2.0% lived in rural areas.

There were 4,512 households in Wabash, of which 26.4% had children under the age of 18 living in them. Of all households, 40.1% were married-couple households, 21.6% were households with a male householder and no spouse or partner present, and 31.5% were households with a female householder and no spouse or partner present. About 35.8% of all households were made up of individuals and 15.9% had someone living alone who was 65 years of age or older.

There were 5,082 housing units, of which 11.2% were vacant. The homeowner vacancy rate was 3.1% and the rental vacancy rate was 9.2%.

Racial composition as of the 2020 census
Race	Number	Percent
White	9,662	92.5%
Black or African American	75	0.7%
American Indian and Alaska Native	70	0.7%
Asian	58	0.6%
Native Hawaiian and Other Pacific Islander	1	0.0%
Some other race	120	1.1%
Two or more races	454	4.3%
Hispanic or Latino (of any race)	272	2.6%

=== 2010 census ===
As of the census of 2010, there were 10,666 people, 4,465 households, and 2,805 families living in the city. The population density was 1,199.8 inhabitants per square mile (463.2/km^{2}). There were 5,068 housing units at an average density of 570.1 units per square mile (220.1 units/km^{2}). The racial makeup of the city was 96.3% White, 0.4% African American, 1.0% Native American, 0.5% Asian, 0.6% from other races, and 1.2% from two or more races. Hispanic or Latino of any race were 2.0% of the population.

There were 4,465 households, of which 29.3% had children under the age of 18 living with them, 45.7% were married couples living together, 12.5% had a female householder with no husband present, 4.7% had a male householder with no wife present, and 37.2% were non-families. 32.6% of all households were made up of individuals, and 14.9% had someone living alone who was 65 years of age or older. The average household size was 2.31 and the average family size was 2.88.

The median age in the city was 41.3 years. 22.5% of residents were under the age of 18; 7.9% were between the ages of 18 and 24; 24.7% were from 25 to 44; 26.4% were from 45 to 64; and 18.8% were 65 years of age or older. The gender makeup of the city was 47.2% male and 52.8% female.

=== 2000 census ===
Historical population
Census	Pop.	Note	%±
1850	966		—
1860	1,520		57.3%
1870	2,881		89.5%
1880	3,800		31.9%
1890	5,105		34.3%
1900	8,618		68.8%
1910	8,687		0.8%
1920	9,872		13.6%
1930	8,840		−10.5%
1940	9,653		9.2%
1950	10,621		10.0%
1960	12,621		18.8%
1970	13,379		6.0%
1980	12,985		−2.9%
1990	12,127		−6.6%
2000	11,743		−3.2%
2010	10,666		−9.2%
2020	10,440		−2.1%
Source: US Census Bureau

As of the census of 2000, there were 11,743 people, 4,799 households, and 3,100 families living in the city. The population density was 1,319.0 inhabitants per square mile (509.3/km^{2}). There were 5,136 housing units at an average density of 576.9 units per square mile (222.7 units/km^{2}). The racial makeup of the city was 96.85% White, 0.37% African American, 1.06% Native American, 0.51% Asian, 0.03% Pacific Islander, 0.41% from other races, and 0.77% from two or more races. Hispanic or Latino of any race were 1.46% of the population.

There were 4,799 households, out of which 29.2% had children under the age of 18 living with them, 49.6% were married couples living together, 11.1% had a female householder with no husband present, and 35.4% were non-families. 30.9% of all households were made up of individuals, and 13.4% had someone living alone who was 65 years of age or older. The average household size was 2.36 and the average family size was 2.95.

In the city, the population was spread out, with 24.3% under the age of 18, 9.0% from 18 to 24, 27.4% from 25 to 44, 22.9% from 45 to 64, and 16.4% who were 65 years of age or older. The median age was 37 years. For every 100 females, there were 91.0 males. For every 100 females age 18 and over, there were 87.3 males.

The median income for a household in the city was $12,000, and the median income for a family was $14000. Males had a median income of $18000 versus $12,000 for females. The per capita income for the city was $18,210. About 7.9% of families and 9.3% of the population were below the poverty line, including 12.5% of those under age 18 and 8.8% of those age 65 or over.

== Arts and culture ==
=== Theater ===
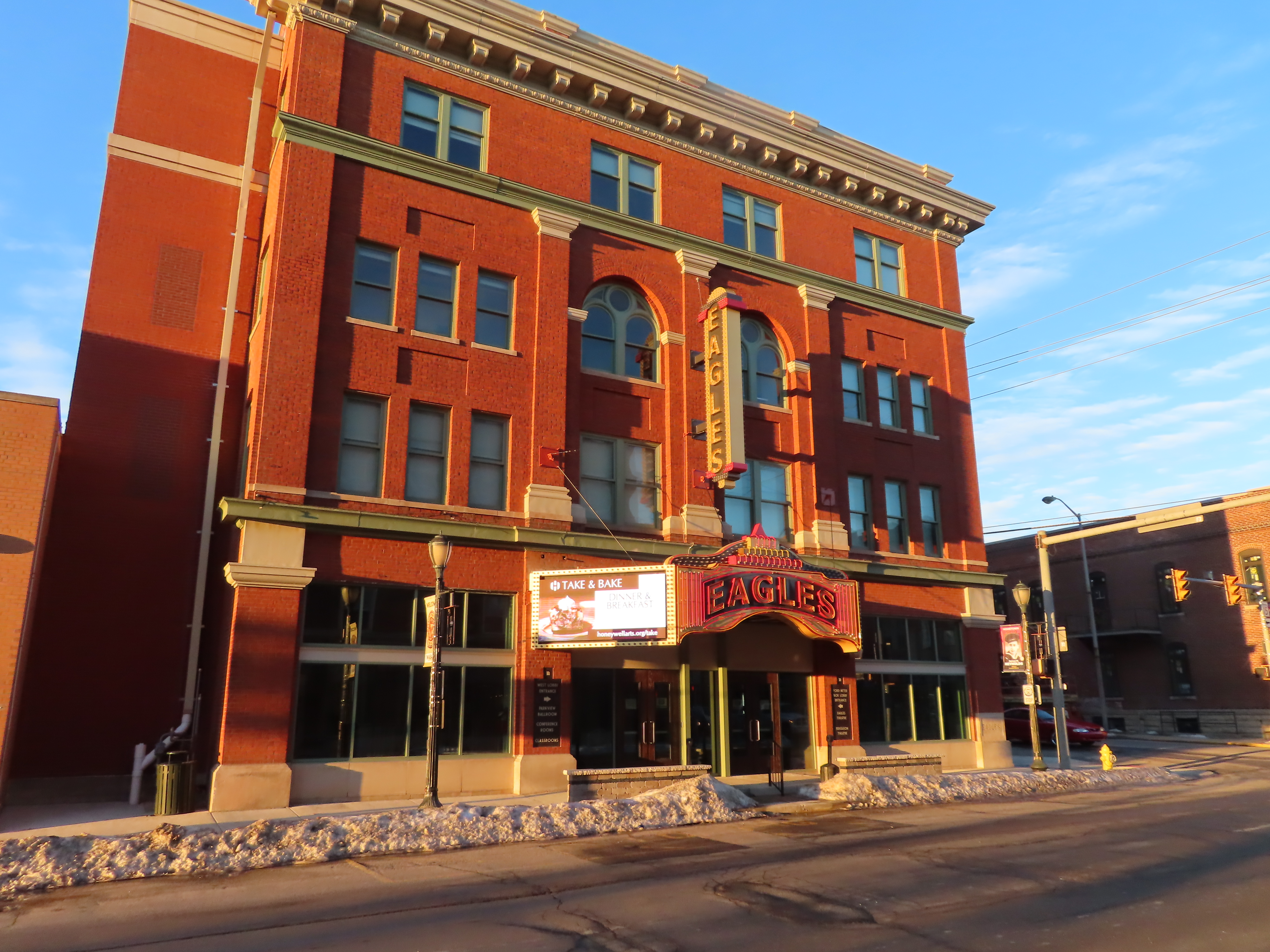
Eagles Theatre

Opened on March 30, 1906, the Eagles Theatre was built as a vaudeville theatre. In the late 1920s it was remodeled by architect Alvin M. Strauss and had switched to movies by the 1930s. further remodeling was carried out in 1939 when it was redecorated in the Art Deco style. The Eagles Theatre has one of the largest screens remaining in Indiana and has 2 balconies and a ballroom. The Eagles Theatre was added to the National Register of Historic Places in 1985.

The Honeywell Center is a performing arts center located in downtown Wabash. Construction of the 45,000-square-foot-facility began in 1940 but was postponed until 1957. In 1997, a 75,000-square-foot addition included the 1,500-seat Ford Theater, Eugenia's Restaurant and an art gallery.

== Economy ==
The Honeywell Corporation was founded in the 1880s in Wabash, Indiana. Wabash is home to The Ford Meter Box Company, a prominent manufacturer in the waterworks industry. Wabash is also home to many smaller companies. Papers industries Inc., Beacon Credit Union, The Metropolitan School District also employs many people (100 - 200)

== Religion ==
The city's largest congregation is the United Methodist Church; other churches in the city include: Presbyterian, Church of the Nazarene, Catholic, Christian, Baptist, Wesleyan, and Pentecostal.

== Government ==
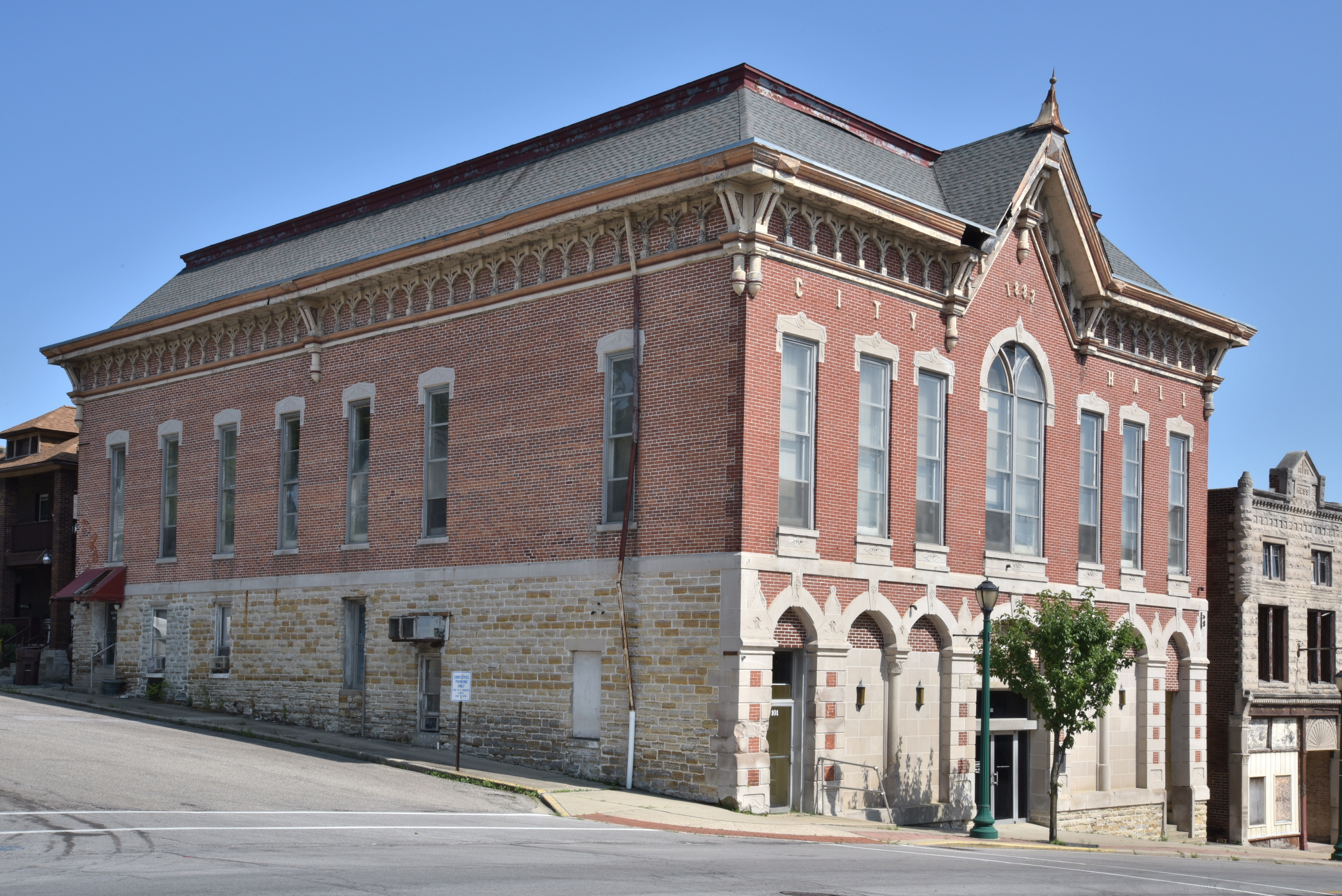
Wabash City Hall

The government consists of a mayor and a city council. The mayor is elected in citywide vote. The city council consists of 7 members with 5 elected from individual districts and two elected at-large. The current members of city council are:

- Bryan Dillion (R, AL)
- John Burnsworth (R, AL)
- David Weaver (R, 1st)
- Dave Monroe (R, 2nd)
- Terry Brewer (R, 3rd)
- Susan Bonfitto (R, 4th)
- Jan Roland (R, 5th)

The Wabash post office has been in operation since 1839.

== Education ==
=== Higher education ===
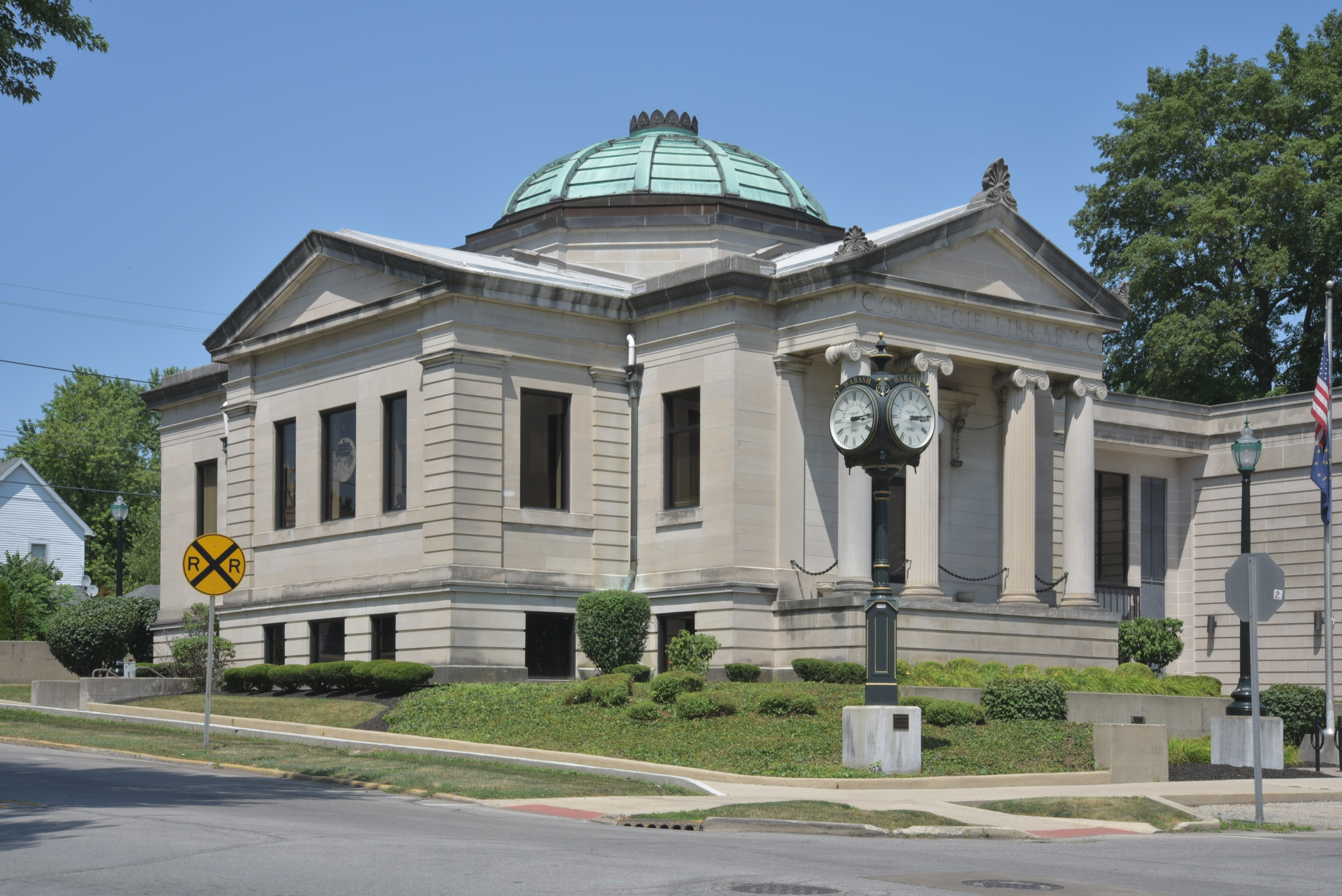
The Wabash Carnegie Public Library.

There are 2 universities within 20 miles of Wabash. The biggest and most notable being Manchester University which is based in North Manchester and Huntington University which is located in Huntington.

=== Primary and secondary schools ===
- OJ Neighbours Elementary School
- Meroby Elementary School
- St Bernard Elementary School
- Wabash Middle School
- Wabash High School

The town has a lending library, the Wabash Carnegie Public Library.

== Image gallery ==
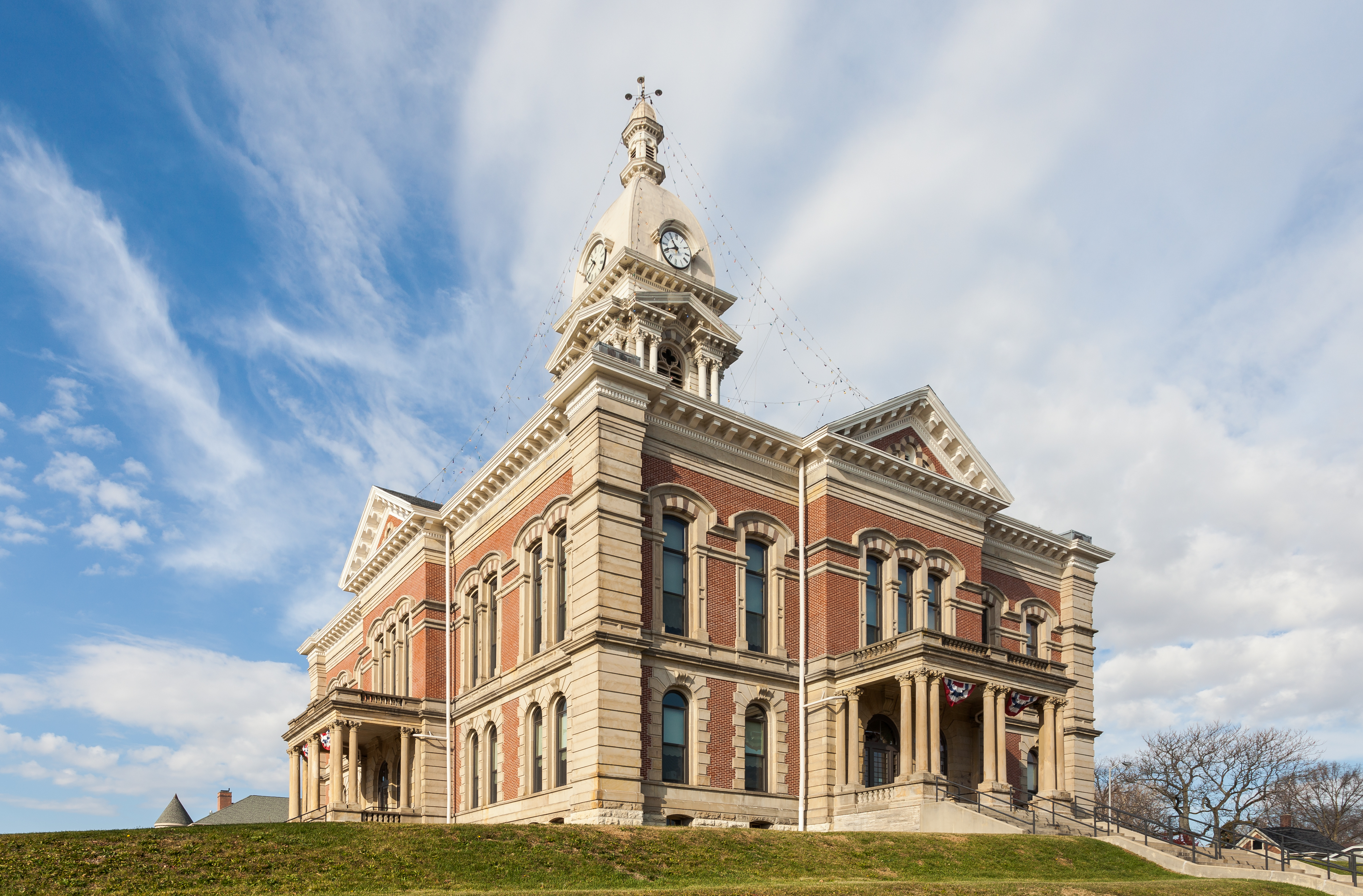
Wabash County Courthouse

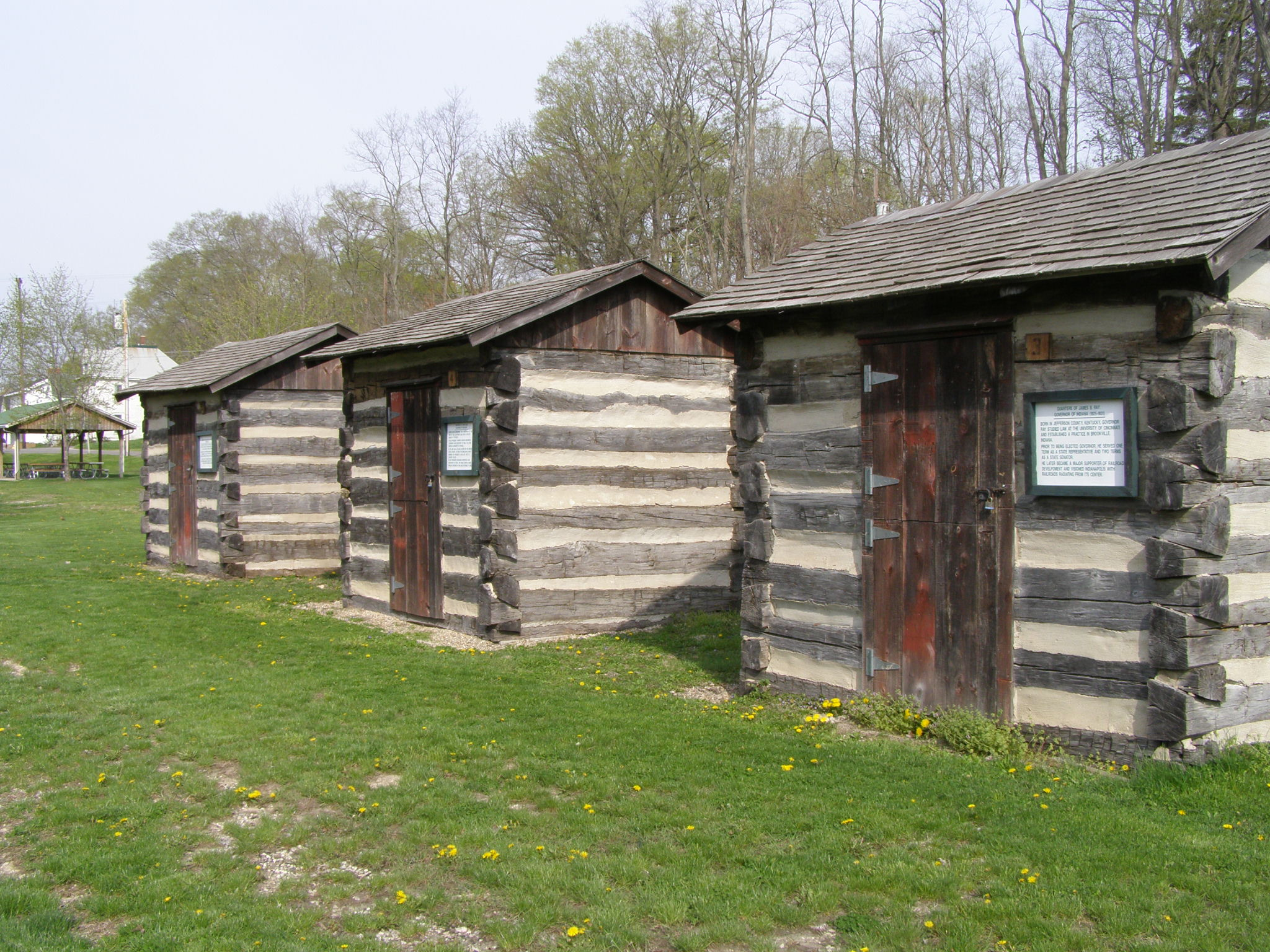
Paradise Spring Treaty Grounds (1826)

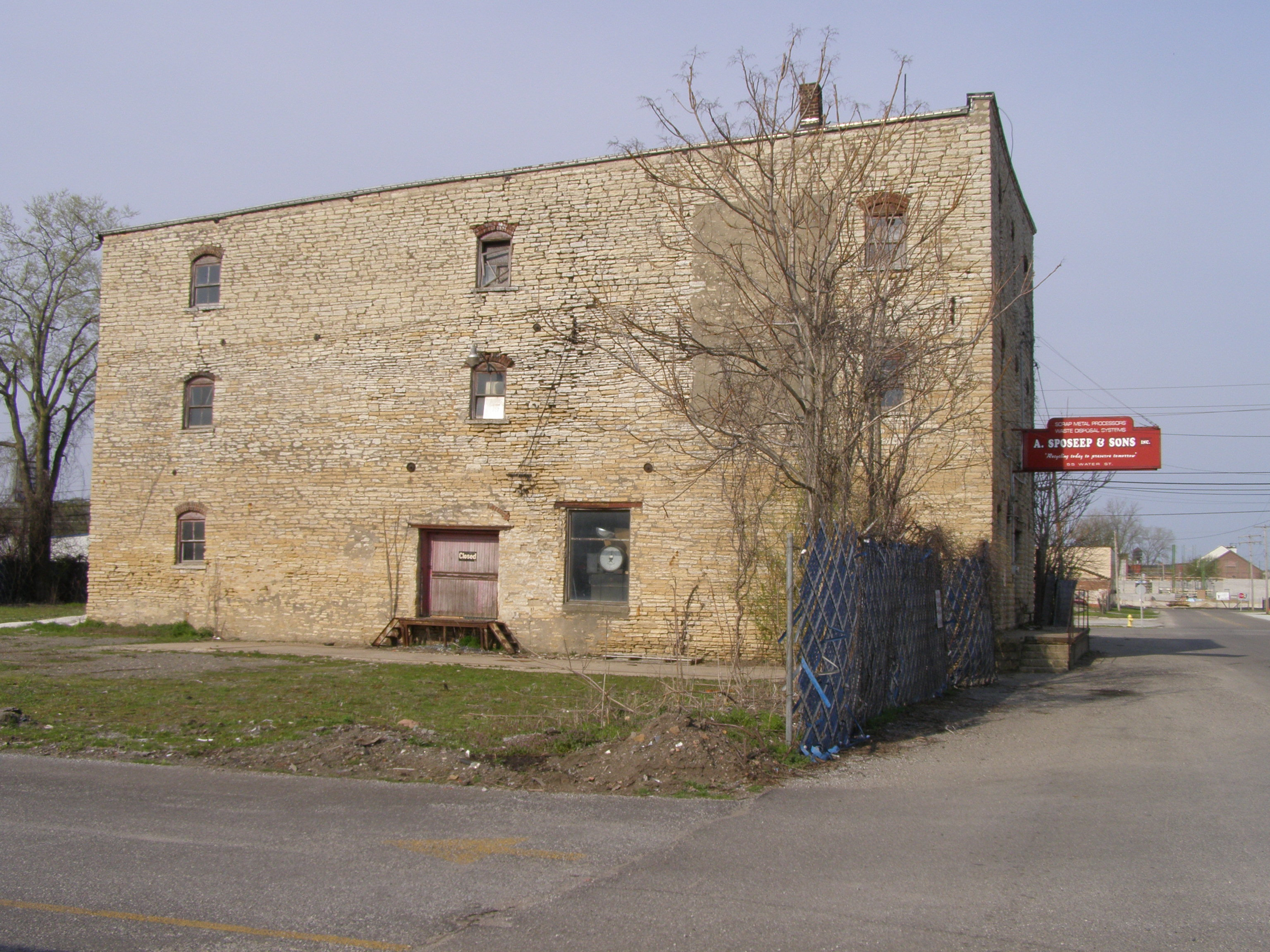
Old Warehouse, which backs up on the Wabash and Erie Canal

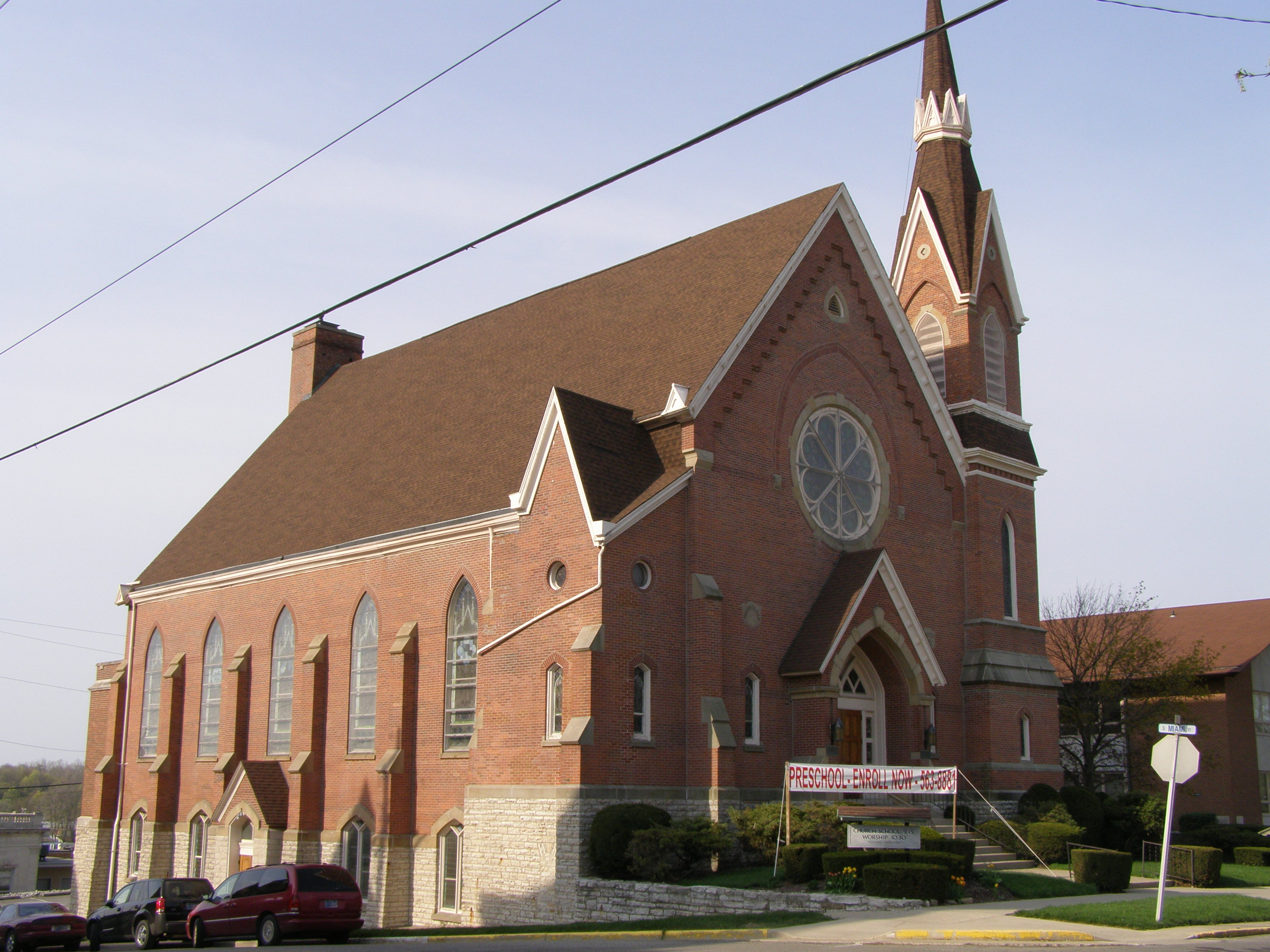
Presbyterian Church (1880)

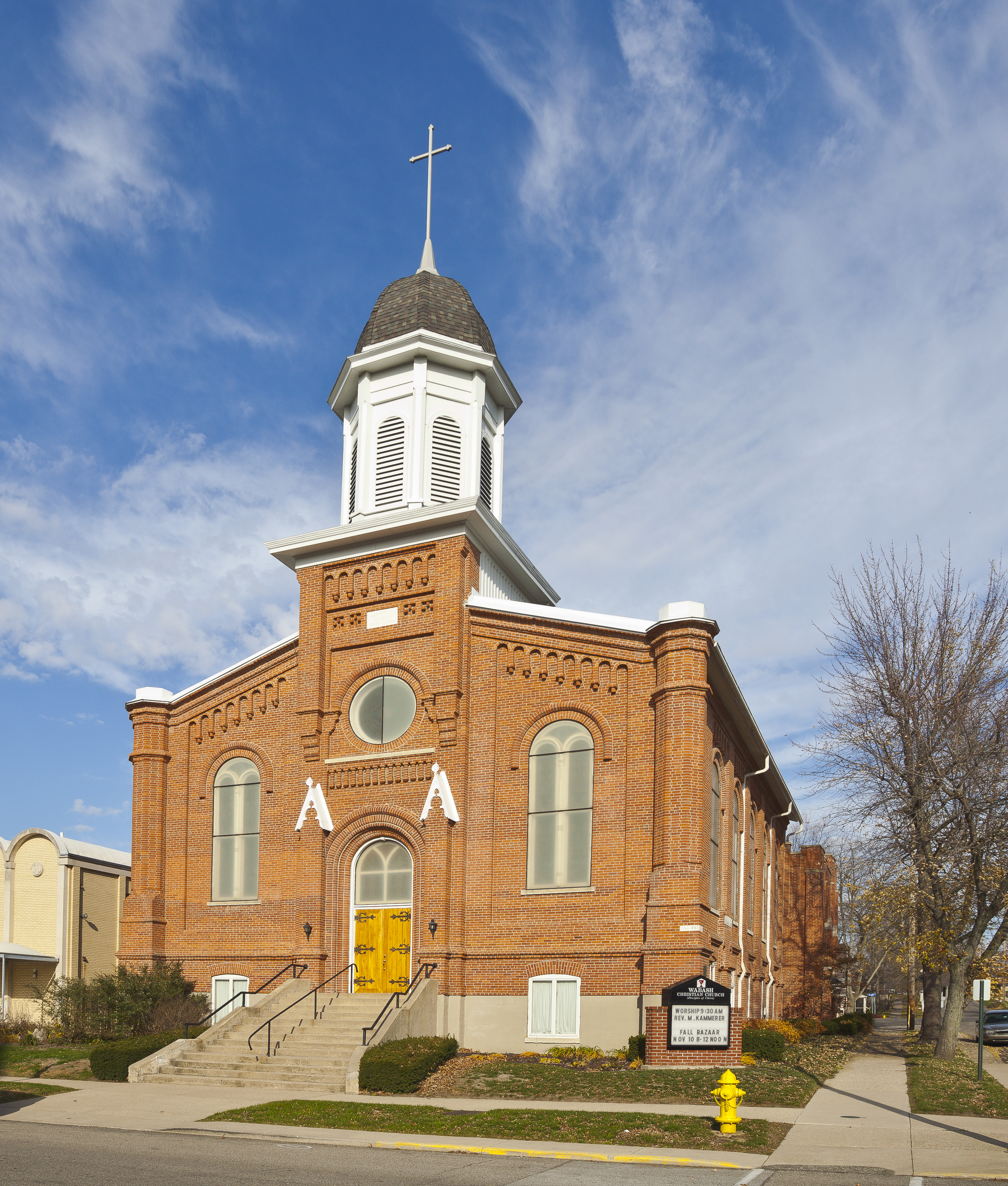
Disciples of Christ Christian Church (1865)

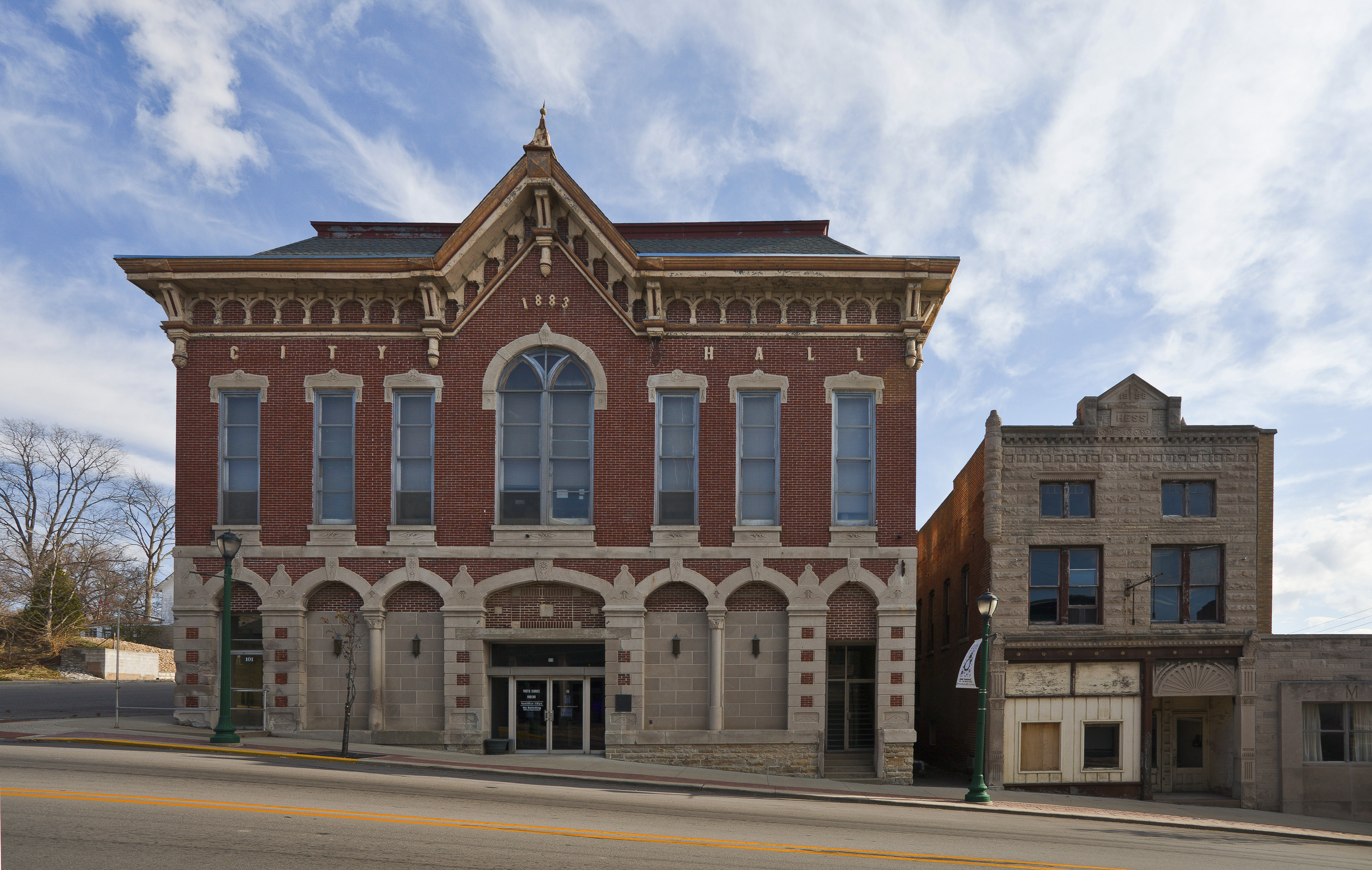
Former fire station and city hall.

== Notable people ==
- Michael Baber - music and sound editor
- Adelaide Steele Baylor - federal education official
- Loren M. Berry – pioneer of Yellow Pages telephone directory
- Rick Brandenburg – entomologist
- Lena Clauve - University of New Mexico's first Dean of Women
- John W. Corso – art director and production designer
- John P. Costas - telecommunications engineer, noted for Costas loop
- James E. Dabler - Illinois state representative and businessman
- Jimmy Daywalt – race car driver
- Charles Dingle - actor
- Gus Dorais – football player and coach of football, basketball, and baseball
- Townsend A. Ely – Michigan state senator
- Crystal Gayle - country singer
- Christopher M. Goff- Indiana's 110th Supreme Court Justice
- Larry Hall - Serial killer
- Mark Honeywell – founder of Honeywell Corporation and Honeywell Center
- Howard A. Howe - polio researcher
- O. P. Hubbard - member of the Alaska Senate (1915–1919).
- Bobby Jones – National Football League guard
- Joaquin Miller - poet and frontiersman
- George Mullin - Major League Baseball player
- Keith O'Conner Murphy - Rockabilly Hall of Fame singer and songwriter
- Margie Stewart - U.S. Army poster girl during World War II

== See also ==
- The Ford Meter Box Company, prominent manufacturer headquartered in Wabash
