= Mark C. Honeywell =

American entrepreneur (1874–1964)

- Born: December 29, 1874; Wabash, Indiana, U.S.
- Died: September 13, 1964 (aged 89)
- Education: Eastman Business College
- Occupations: Founder and CEO of Honeywell

Mark Charles Honeywell (December 29, 1874 – September 13, 1964) was an American electronics industrialist. He co-initiated the eponymous corporation Honeywell and was its first president and CEO (1927–1933).

== Early years and marriage ==
Honeywell spent his childhood growing up in Wabash, Indiana, and Florida. He had various jobs during his younger years, including working in the citrus and bicycle businesses, and in his father's Wabash mill. He graduated from Eastman Business College in Poughkeepsie, New York, in 1891.

Honeywell was married twice. His first wife, Olive May Lutz, whom he married in 1899, died in 1939 as the result of a fall while on a boating excursion in Florida. In 1942, he married Eugenia (née Hubbard) Nixon, the widow of Don Morrison Nixon, a newspaperman from Wabash, Indiana. Eugenia died on February 8, 1974, in a house fire. Though originally believed to have been a faulty thermostat, the Wabash fire investigator said that there had not been a valve malfunction. In the newspaper Wabash Plain Dealer, fire chief Jack Saril said, "We have not been able to find any other possible causes in the area where we know it started."

== Honeywell Corporation ==
Honeywell developed a hot water home heating system, and by 1905, had installed the system in his house. It was thought to be the first such system in North America. The idea of hot water heating came from England. Radiators first came from England, and molds were made from them in Wabash. His business, M.C. Honeywell Heating and Sanitary Work, became Honeywell Heating Specialties Company. By 1906, the company was making thermostats and automatic controls for heating systems.

By 1927, annual company sales were more than $1.5 million, and 450 people worked in the Wabash factory. Honeywell's main competitor was W.R. Sweatt and his Minneapolis Heat Regulator Company. The two companies had patents which blocked each other from further growth. They merged to form the Minneapolis-Honeywell Regulator Company, with Sweatt as chairman and Honeywell as president.

As of 2007, Honeywell International, Inc., the corporate descendant of Minneapolis-Honeywell, was a global business with more than 100,000 employees.
