= National Register of Historic Places listings in Wabash County, Indiana =

Location of Wabash County in Indiana

Wabash County, Indiana, United States, has 32 properties and districts listed on the National Register of Historic Places. Another two properties were once listed but have been removed.

Properties and districts located in incorporated areas display the name of the municipality, while properties and districts in unincorporated areas display the name of their civil township. Properties and districts split between multiple jurisdictions display the names of all jurisdictions. Latitude and longitude coordinates are provided for many National Register properties and districts; these locations may be seen together in a map.

This National Park Service list is complete through NPS recent listings posted May 1, 2026.

== Current listings ==
	Name on the Register	Image	Date listed	Location	City or town	Description
1	13-24 Drive-In Movie Theater	13-24 Drive-In Movie Theater	May 26, 2021 (#100006572)	890 North IN 13; 40°50′17″N 85°47′33″W	Wabash	
2	4th Roann Covered Bridge	4th Roann Covered Bridge	August 6, 1981 (#81000022)	North of Roann on N. County Road 700W; 40°54′56″N 85°55′27″W	Paw Paw Township and Roann	
3	James M. Amoss Building	James M. Amoss Building	August 30, 1984 (#84001742)	110 S. Wabash St. 40°47′52″N 85°49′16″W	Wabash	
4	Downtown Wabash Historic District	Downtown Wabash Historic District	July 18, 1986 (#86001678)	Roughly bounded by Hill, Wabash, Canal, and Miami Sts. 40°47′50″N 85°49′17″W	Wabash	
5	East Wabash Historic District	East Wabash Historic District	June 23, 2011 (#11000390)	Roughly bounded by Walnut, E. Market, N. Wabash, and S. East Sts. 40°47′56″N 85°49′04″W	Wabash	
6	F. & A.M. Tuscan Lodge No. 143		December 1, 2020 (#100005869)	828 Washington St. 40°50′11″N 85°43′41″W	Lagro	
7	First Christian Church	First Christian Church	June 23, 1983 (#83000161)	110 W. Hill St. 40°47′56″N 85°49′22″W	Wabash	
8	Halderman-Van Buskirk Farmstead	Halderman-Van Buskirk Farmstead	March 20, 2013 (#13000092)	5653 N700W, south of Roann; 40°54′22″N 85°55′26″W	Paw Paw Township	
9	Hominy Ridge Shelter House	Hominy Ridge Shelter House	September 23, 1994 (#94001122)	On the south bank of the Salamonie River, north of Hominy Ridge Lake and southeast of Lagro, in the Salamonie River State Forest; 40°48′34″N 85°40′59″W	Lagro Township	
10	Honeywell Memorial Community Center	Honeywell Memorial Community Center	July 15, 1983 (#83000042)	275 W. Market St. 40°47′45″N 85°49′30″W	Wabash	
11	Honeywell Studio	Honeywell Studio	June 17, 2005 (#05000609)	378 N. State Road 15; 40°49′48″N 85°51′26″W	Wabash	
12	Hopewell Methodist Episcopal Church and Cemetery	Hopewell Methodist Episcopal Church and Cemetery	September 14, 2015 (#15000600)	5031 E300N; 40°52′13″N 85°41′57″W	Lagro Township	
13	I.O.R.M. Hall, Tonkawa No. 126		December 1, 2020 (#100005871)	820 Washington St. 40°50′11″N 85°43′41″W	Lagro	
14	LaFontaine Historic District	LaFontaine Historic District	September 30, 2014 (#14000809)	Roughly Kendall and Branson between Walnut and Gruell Sts. 40°40′27″N 85°43′21″W	La Fontaine	
15	Lentz House (Hotel Sheller)	Lentz House (Hotel Sheller)	November 14, 1982 (#82000050)	Walnut and 2nd Sts. 41°00′01″N 85°46′08″W	North Manchester	
16	Thomas J. Lewis House	Thomas J. Lewis House	June 21, 2006 (#06000521)	105 S. Arnold St. 40°54′41″N 85°55′18″W	Roann	
17	Thomas R. Marshall School	Thomas R. Marshall School	March 22, 2004 (#04000206)	603 Bond St. 41°00′19″N 85°45′45″W	North Manchester	
18	McNamee-Ford House	McNamee-Ford House	March 3, 1995 (#95000199)	536 N. Wabash St. 40°48′20″N 85°49′16″W	Wabash	
19	Noftzger-Adams House	Noftzger-Adams House	November 14, 1979 (#79000024)	102 E. 3rd St. 41°00′06″N 85°46′11″W	North Manchester	
20	North Manchester Covered Bridge	North Manchester Covered Bridge	September 30, 1982 (#82000051)	S. Mill St. at the Eel River; 40°59′45″N 85°45′55″W	North Manchester	
21	North Manchester Historic District	North Manchester Historic District	June 27, 2002 (#02000687)	Roughly bounded by Maple, 3rd, and Mill Sts., and the northern bank of the Eel River; 40°59′58″N 85°46′15″W	North Manchester	
22	North Manchester Public Library	North Manchester Public Library	March 14, 1996 (#96000290)	204 W. Main St. 40°59′57″N 85°46′20″W	North Manchester	
23	North Wabash Historic District	North Wabash Historic District	September 3, 1999 (#99001077)	Roughly bounded by W. Maple, N. Carroll, Ferry, Miami, Pawling, N. Wabash, and Union Sts. 40°48′13″N 85°49′18″W	Wabash	
24	Peabody Memorial Tower	Peabody Memorial Tower	June 24, 2010 (#10000377)	400 W. 7th St. 41°00′22″N 85°46′33″W	North Manchester	
25	Roann Historic District	Roann Historic District	March 20, 2013 (#13000093)	Roughly bounded by State Road 16 and West, Ohio, and Beamer Sts. 40°54′40″N 85°55′30″W	Paw Paw Township and Roann	
26	Roann-Paw Paw Township Public Library	Roann-Paw Paw Township Public Library	December 20, 2002 (#02001561)	240 S. Chippewa Rd. 40°54′36″N 85°55′29″W	Roann	
27	St. Patrick's Roman Catholic Church	St. Patrick's Roman Catholic Church	March 12, 1999 (#99000306)	W. Main St. 40°50′11″N 85°43′48″W	Lagro	
28	Stockdale Mill	Stockdale Mill	March 24, 2004 (#04000204)	N. County Road 800W at Stockdale; 40°54′52″N 85°56′36″W	Paw Paw Township	
29	Teague Barn Wabash Importing Company Farm Stable	Teague Barn Wabash Importing Company Farm Stable	June 27, 2002 (#02000691)	4568 W. Mill Creek Pike, southwest of Wabash; 40°46′31″N 85°52′44″W	Noble Township	
30	West Wabash Historic District	West Wabash Historic District	April 21, 1988 (#88000447)	Bounded roughly by the Norfolk Southern railroad line and Union, Wabash, Miami, Main, and Holliday Sts. 40°47′54″N 85°49′28″W	Wabash	
31	Josiah White's Manual Labor Institute		November 15, 2022 (#100008413)	Each side of Cty. Rd. 50 East/Bailey Rd. extending south approx. 1/2 mi. from W 500 S. 40°44′53″N 85°46′52″W	Wabash vicinity	
32	Solomon Wilson Building	Solomon Wilson Building	August 30, 1984 (#84001743)	102 S. Wabash St. 40°47′52″N 85°49′15″W	Wabash	

== Former listing ==
	Name on the Register	Image	Date listed	Date removed	Location	City or town	Description
1	Manchester College Historic District	Manchester College Historic District	December 27, 1990 (#90001929)	May 22, 2023	604 College Ave. 41°00′38″N 85°45′45″W	North Manchester	
2	North Manchester Planing and Band Saw Mill		March 5, 1982 (#82000052)	June 12, 1995	705 Main (mill); 706-708 W. Grant and 202 N. High St. (houses); 40°59′55″N 85°46′40″W	North Manchester	Also known as J.A. Browne Co. Mill.

== See also ==
- List of National Historic Landmarks in Indiana
- National Register of Historic Places listings in Indiana
- Listings in neighboring counties: Fulton, Grant, Huntington, Kosciusko, Miami, Whitley
- List of Indiana state historical markers in Wabash County
