= Kenneth Brown =

Kenneth Brown may refer to:

- Kenneth Brown (playwright) (born 1954), Canadian playwright, actor, director, and producer
- Kenneth Brown (academic) (1933–2010), American peace studies academic
- Kenneth Brown (author) (Kenneth P. Brown, Jr.), American president of the Alexis de Tocqueville Institution
- Kenneth Brown (cricketer) (born 1967), South African cricketer
- Kenneth Brown (pastoralist) (1837–1876), Western Australian pastoralist, explorer, and executed murderer
- Kenneth Brown (journalist) (1868–1958), American journalist
- Kenneth Brown (interior designer) (born 1971), American interior designer
- Kenneth Brown (mathematician) (born 1945), American professor working in category and cohomology theory
- Kenneth J. Brown (born 1925), Canadian-born American labor union leader
- Kenneth H. Brown (1936–2022), American playwright and writer
- Kenneth L. Brown (born 1936), American diplomat
- Kenneth M. Brown (1887–1955), Canadian pulp and paper worker and political figure in Newfoundland
- Kenneth Francis Brown (1919–2014), American politician and businessman

== See also ==
- Ken Brown (disambiguation)
- Kenneth Browne (disambiguation)
