= List of Indiana state historical markers in Wabash County =

Location of Wabash County in Indiana

This is a list of the Indiana state historical markers in Wabash County.

This is intended to be a complete list of the official state historical markers placed in Wabash County, Indiana, United States by the Indiana Historical Bureau. The locations of the historical markers and their latitude and longitude coordinates are included below when available, along with their names, years of placement, and topics as recorded by the Historical Bureau. There are 8 historical markers located in Wabash County.

== Historical markers ==
Marker title	Image	Year placed	Location	Topics
Camp Wabash 1862-65		1962	Northwestern corner of the junction of Chestnut and Columbus Streets along the Wabash River in Wabash; 40°47′18.8″N 85°49′23″W	Military
First Electrically Lighted City		1966	Southeastern portion of the Wabash County Courthouse lawn, along Wabash Street in Wabash; 40°47′53″N 85°49′24″W	Science, Medicine, and Inventions
Frances Slocum		1967	Entrance to the Frances Slocum Cemetery, near Mississinewa Lake at the junction of County Roads 650W and 900S, near Somerset; 40°41′55″N 85°54′28″W	American Indian/Native American, Women
Paradise Spring Treaty Ground		1992	Junction of Allen and Market Streets at the Paradise Spring Historical Park in Wabash; 40°47′50″N 85°49′1″W	American Indian/Native American, Transportation
Miami Indian Mills		1995	Junction of Mill and Jefferson Streets near the community center and the Lions Club in Richvalley; 40°47′12″N 85°55′20″W	Business, Industry, and Labor, American Indian/Native American
St. Patrick's Roman Catholic Church		2000	Junction of Main and Harrison Streets in Lagro; 40°50′11″N 85°43′48″W	Religion, Immigration and Ethnic Groups, Buildings and Architecture, Business, Industry, and Labor
Brethren's Annual Meeting		2006	Harter's Grove (Warvel Park), 108 W. 7th Street in North Manchester; 41°0′21″N 85°46′18″W	Religion, Special Events
Thomas Riley Marshall		2007	Next to the North Manchester Library (405 N. Market Street) in North Manchester; 41°0′10″N 85°46′8″W	Politics

== See also ==
- List of Indiana state historical markers
- National Register of Historic Places listings in Wabash County, Indiana
