= Manchester Historic District =

Manchester Historic District may refer to:

- Manchester Historic District (Manchester, Connecticut), listed on the NRHP in Hartford County, Connecticut
- Manchester College Historic District, North Manchester, Indiana, listed on the NRHP in Wabash County, Indiana
- North Manchester Historic District, North Manchester, Indiana, listed on the NRHP in Wabash County, Indiana
- Manchester Village Historic District (Manchester, Massachusetts), NRHP-listed
- Manchester Historic District (Pittsburgh, Pennsylvania), NRHP-listed
- Manchester Village Historic District (Manchester, Vermont), NRHP-listed
- Manchester Industrial Historic District, Richmond, Virginia, listed on the NRHP in Richmond, Virginia
- Manchester Residential and Commercial Historic District, Richmond, Virginia, listed on the NRHP in Richmond, Virginia

== See also ==
- Maplewood Commercial Historic District at Manchester and Sutton, Maplewood, Missouri, listed on the NRHP in St. Louis County, Missouri
