= North Manchester Historic District =

Historic district in Indiana, United States

- U.S. National Register of Historic Places
- U.S. Historic district
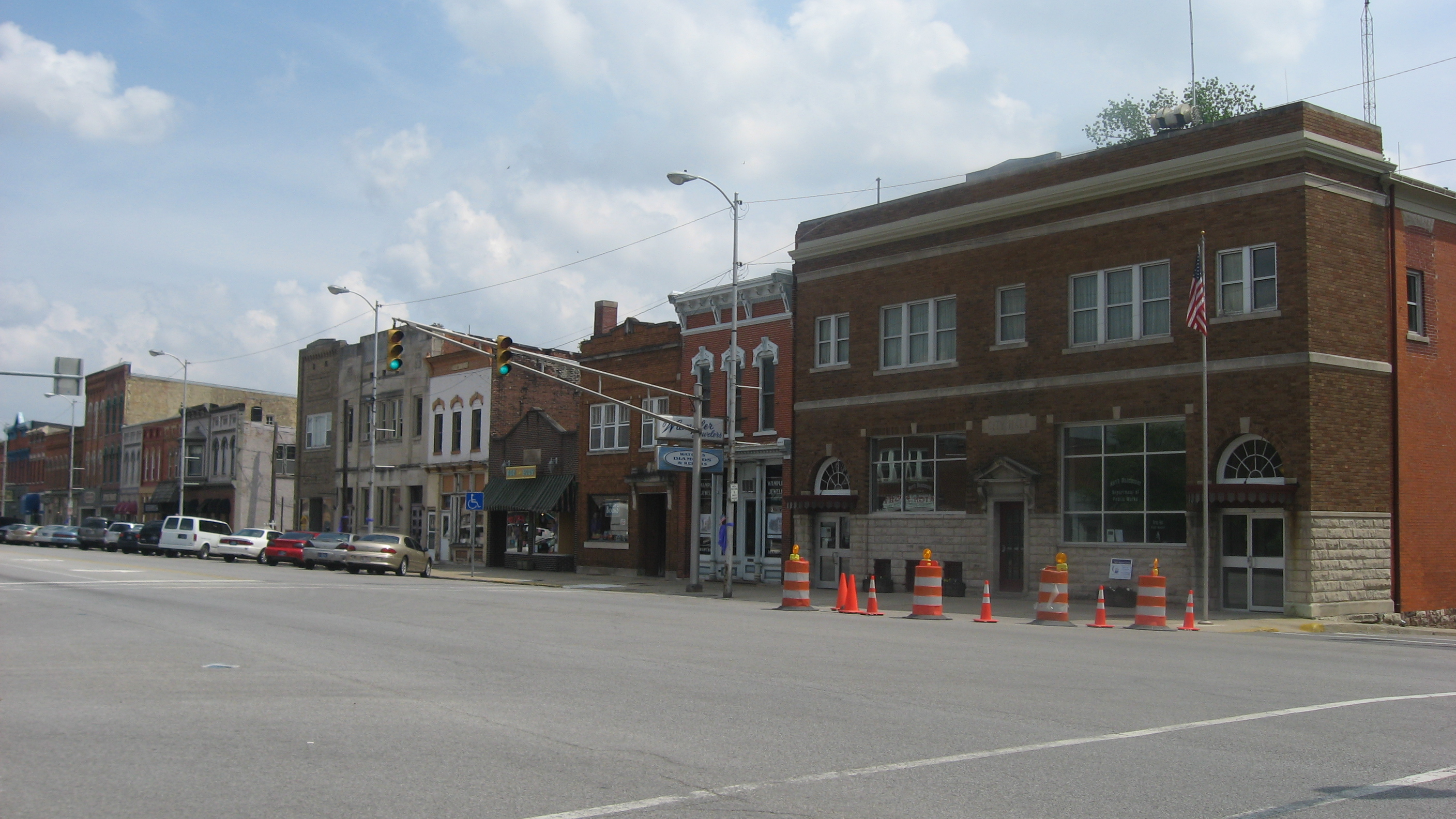
- Main Street in North Manchester, May 2012

- Location within Indiana Location within the United States
- Interactive map showing the location of North Manchester Historic District
- Location: Roughly bounded by Maple, 3rd, and Mill Sts., and N bank of the Eel R., North Manchester, Indiana
- Coordinates: 40°59′58″N 85°46′15″W
- Area: 75 acres (30 ha)
- Architectural style: Greek Revival, Gothic Revival
- NRHP reference No.: 02000687
- Added to NRHP: June 27, 2002

North Manchester Historic District is a national historic district located at North Manchester, Indiana. It encompasses 159 contributing buildings in the central business district and surrounding residential sections of North Manchester. It developed between about 1870 and 1938, and includes representative examples of Greek Revival, Gothic Revival, Italianate, Queen Anne, and Bungalow / American Craftsman style architecture. Located in the district are the separately listed Lentz House (Hotel Sheller), Noftzger-Adams House, and North Manchester Public Library. Other notable buildings include the John Lavey House (1874), Horace Winton House (c. 1875), Agricultural Block (1886), Moose Lodge (1886), North Manchester City Hall, Masonic Hall (1907), Zion Lutheran Church (1882), and North Manchester Post Office (1935).

It was listed on the National Register of Historic Places in 2002.

== Contributing ==
John Lavey House, 108 South Elm Street

The Lavey House was completed in 1874 It is an Italianate style. The two-story red brick residence has three bays. The entry to the house is through the right (north) bay. The house has wide eaves under a hipped roof. Window sit on a stone sill, under a brick lintel with wooden shutters. A wrought iron railings surrounds the exterior at the base of the first-floor windows. The front portico has stone steps and deck, topped by two wooden columns covered by a flat roof. The front door is flanked by two pilasters. A wrought iron railing follows the perimeter of the roof.

Horace Winton House, 202 North Market Street

The Horace Winton House, was built around 1875, has dominant architectural elements from two styles, Italianate, and Queen Anne. The asymmetrical plan is typical of Italianate and includes its red brick exterior walls, tall, rectangular, and narrow window openings, its wide eaves, and its hipped roof. Full height, three-sided bays grace both the east and west facades. The large, one-story porch wraps the front and east facades.

Agricultural Block, 224-226 East Main Street

The Agricultural Block is a commercial Italianate style completed in 1886. The storefront remains intact. The building is constructed of brick, painted now, and has two-stories. Commercial space is at ground level and second floor has living space. The second-floor windows have sills of stone, and the lintels are obscured by flat hooded crowns with square corners that are detailed with a decorative escutcheon in the keystone position. The building is capped with an elaborate entablature consisting of a narrow frieze, brackets, and a projecting cornice. The spaces between the brackets are decorated with painted floral detailing. On the right half of the building cap is a raised portion of the cornice that creates a flat surface upon which is inscribed "Agricultural Block 1886.".

Moose Lodge, 205-207 East Main Street

The Moose Lodge is an Italianate commercial building completed in 1886. It has been altered at street level but retains its original styling in good condition on the upper story. Before the Moose Lodge, the building housed a local G.A.R. Post 199 in its upper floor. The storefront has been remodeled. Above the altered portion of the front facade are six rectangular, flat-topped window openings that are crowned with elaborate bracketed hoods. The building is capped with an ornate entablature consisting of a bracketed frieze and a dominant projecting cornice. The peak of the gable is capped with an ornate finial. The storefronts have been altered so they no longer possess any architectural significance.

North Manchester City Hall, 101-103 East Main Street

City Hall is a two-story, five bay brick building. At street level there are three entries evenly distributed. The large window openings at street level are detailed with limestone blocks both sides and a limestone keystone. Above the central door is a limestone tablet inscribed "City Hall." The left and right entry door openings are square with an arched transom over a canopy. The first and second floors are separated by a limestone belt course. The second floor has five windows. Above the windows is a projecting limestone cornice and a limestone belt course. The building is topped with a low brick parapet.

Masonic Hall, 104-106 North Walnut Street

The Masonic Hall was completed in 1907. It is a three-story red brick building in two bays. At street level, each bay is a storefront and these in the second and third story have window openings. The street level storefronts have between them an entry door to a central staircase. Brick pilasters rise between bays, capped with limestone capitals. A limestone belt course links the capitals separating the first and second floors. The window openings in the second story are organized in groups of three in each bay with limestone sills and prominent limestone lintels with angle-cut ends. The third story has two window openings on either side of a decorative framing of the Masonic Lodge emblem. Below the emblem is the date "1907." The brick parapet consists of a flat limestone-capped sections on either side of the gable end in the center.

Zion Lutheran Church, 113 East Main Street

The Zion Evangelical Lutheran Church was organized in 1846 during an increase in German immigration. The present Zion Evangelical Lutheran Church is a Gothic-style structure built in 1882. In 1900, the art glass windows replaced the original windows. Dr. Lloyd Douglas who wrote The Robe. He preached here from 1903 to 1905.

North Manchester Post Office, 202 East Second Street

The North Manchester Post Office was completed in 1935 in a style typical of many Works Progress Administration (WPA) post offices. There is a mural on the wall titled "Indiana Farm-Sunday Afternoon". It was completed by artist Alan Tompkins for $540.00 and finished in June 1938. The building is one-story, Neo-Classical brick with five bays. Each bay has a single window opening, with the central bay having the front entrance. The corners are decorated with limestone quoins, rising through the cornice to the stone-capped parapet Each window is topped with a decorative limestone plaque. The entry is up a set of limestone steps with wrought iron side railings. The door is surrounded by two flat limestone pilasters supporting a plain frieze, and broken pediment.
