= Aristides Phoutrides =

Greek-American academic

Aristides Evangelus Phoutrides (also Foutridis) was an Ottoman Greek and later Greek-American classical philologist and Neo-Hellenist born on 17 April 1887, on the Greek island of Ikaria, then under the Ottoman Empire. He taught at Harvard, Yale and the University of Athens.

== Life and career ==
Aristides Phoutrides was born in Evdilos on the Aegean island of Ikaria to Evangelos Foutridis, a captain, and Aspasia (née Poulianos). Due to the scarcity of work on the island during his childhood, Phoutrides' father moved the family to the Khedivate of Egypt (modern-day Egypt). In 1905 Phoutrides migrated to the United States, where he studied at Northfield Mount Hermon School and Harvard University. In 1911, he founded the first Greek American students association, named Helicon (or Helikon). He graduated with a PhD in classics in 1915 and became the youngest professor at Harvard. After World War I, Phoutrides began teaching at Yale University and then the University of Athens in 1919. After Venizelos fell, he returned to Yale in 1920, where he was assistant professor until his death. He was a recipient of the Bowdoin Prize. Much of Phoutrides' career focused on analysing and translating the works of his contemporary and friend, the Greek poet Kostis Palamas, as is reflected by his publication record. Phoutrides also co-published with American mountaineer Francis P. Farquhar and fellow Greek-American writer Demetra Kenneth Brown.

In 1921 he married Margaret Gertrude Garrison in Cambridge, Massachusetts. Phoutrides died suddenly from a heart attack aged 36 in 1923. Two of his brothers, including the Rev. Stephanos Phoutrides, were Greek Orthodox priests in the United States. His nephew and namesake Aristides Stephanos Phoutrides (b. 1925) was a chemical engineer.

== Published works ==
- Notes on the chorus of Aeschylus (1913) [thesis].
- The Chorus of Euripides (1915) [thesis].
- Mt. Parnassus (1915).
- With the gods on Mount Olympus (1915), with Francis P. Farquhar.
- Hesiodic reminiscences in the "Ascraean" of Kostes Palamas (1917).
- Kostes Palamas, a modern Greek world-poet (1917).
- Lights at dawn: poems (1917).
- Kostes Palamas: Life Immovable (1919).
- Modern Greek stories (1920), with Demetra Kenneth Brown (a.k.a., Demetra Vaka).
- A Hundred Voices (1921).
- Royal Blossom, or, Trisevyene (1923).
- Palamas and Hesiod (1929). (posthumously)
- A man's death (1934). (posthumously)
