= Manchester Public Library =

Manchester Public Library may refer to:

In the United Kingdom:

- Manchester Central Library, in Manchester, England

In the United States:

- Manchester Public Library, a branch of the Pine Mountain Regional Library System in Georgia
- North Manchester Public Library, in Wabash County, Indiana
- Manchester City Library, in Manchester, New Hampshire
