= Kenneth Browne =

Kenneth Browne may refer to:

- Kenneth Browne (painter), African-American painter
- Kenneth N. Browne (1923–2000), member of the New York State Assembly
- Kenny Browne (born 1986), Irish footballer

== See also ==
- Kenneth Brown (disambiguation)
