= Ikenberry (disambiguation) =

Ikenberry is the surname of American political scientist John Ikenberry.

Ikenberry may also refer to:

- Judy Shapiro-Ikenberry (born 1942), American long-distance runner
- Marlin Ikenberry (born 1973), American college basketball coach
- Stanley O. Ikenberry (1935–2025), American academic, 14th president of the University of Illinois
- Ikenberry Commons, a group of residence buildings at the University of Illinois
- Ikenberry Hall, a building that is part of the Manchester College Historic District
