= Rosalind A. McKnight =

American religious writer (1934–2010)

Rosalind A. Buck McKnight (January 8, 1934 – February 11, 2010) was an American religious writer and lecturer, the author of Soul Journeys and Cosmic Journeys.

== Biography ==
McKnight was born in Harrodsburg, Kentucky, the daughter of Timothy Buck and Hester Buck. She graduated from Manchester College in Indiana and earned a graduate degree from Union Theological Seminary.She married David Allen McKnight in 1969.

McKnight was interested in the nonphysical dimensions of consciousness. With out-of-body researcher Robert Monroe, the founder of the Monroe Institute, she studied human consciousness, and spoke and wrote about her experiences.
