= Morris Observatory =

Observatory in Indiana, US

Charles S. Morris Observatory
- Organization: Manchester University
- Location: North Manchester, Indiana, United States
- Coordinates: 41°0′47.4″N 85°45′28.1″W
- Established: 1973

Telescopes
- unnamed: 10-inch reflector

Charles S. Morris Observatory is an astronomical observatory owned and operated by Manchester University. Built in 1973, it is located in North Manchester, Indiana.

== See also ==
- List of observatories
