= St. Patrick's Roman Catholic Church (Lagro, Indiana) =

Historic church in Indiana, United States

- U.S. National Register of Historic Places
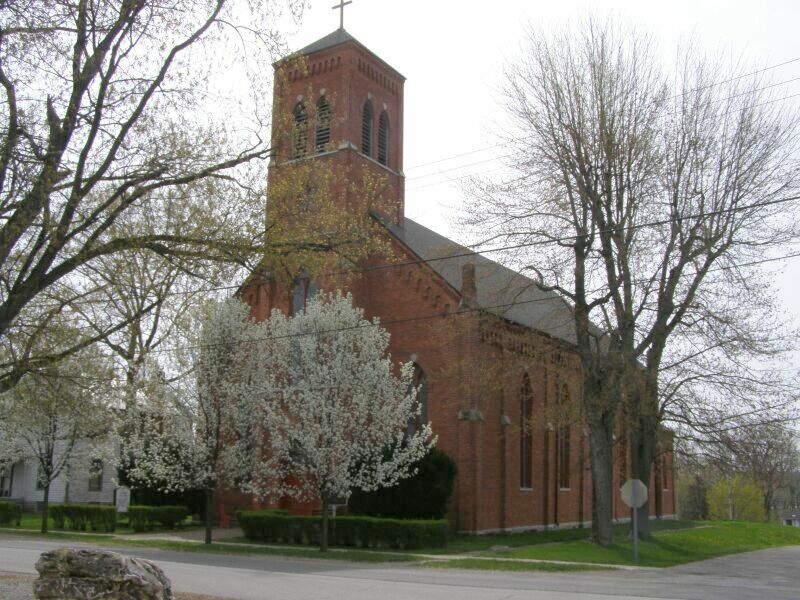
- St. Patrick's Roman Catholic Church, April 2008

- Location within Indiana Location within the United States
- Location: W. Main St., Lagro, Indiana
- Coordinates: 40°50′11″N 85°43′48″W
- Area: less than one acre
- Built: 1870-1873
- Built by: Campion, Father Matthew E.
- Architectural style: Gothic
- NRHP reference No.: 99000306
- Added to NRHP: March 12, 1999

The Oratory of St. Patrick, also known as St. Patrick's Roman Catholic Church is a historic Roman Catholic church located at Lagro, Indiana. It was listed on the National Register of Historic Places in 1999.

== History ==
Jesuit Missionaries, on their way from Montreal, Canada, to Vincennes, visited Lagro as early as 1800. The missionary, Father Stephen Badin, stopped here, in 1833, on his way from Fort Wayne to Logansport. Irish immigrants came to the area to work on construction of Wabash and Erie Canal, 1834–1837. Many bought land and stayed as permanent residents. The parish was founded in 1836. In 1838, Thomas Fitzgibbon donated two lots, and a frame church, 30x40 feet was erected.

Rev. John Ryan, was pastor of St. Patrick's from 1848 to 1865. Mission stations were Huntington, Wabash, Warsaw and Pierceton, where Mass was offered in private homes. The church bell was obtained during the tenure of Father Ryan. It was brought by ox cart from Buffalo. It hangs in the present church. Rev. George Steiner was pastor from 1866 until 1868. Steiner bought a frame house for $200, and opened in it the first parochial school, with Julia Cannon, the teacher. After completion of the new church, the parish school was relocated to the old frame building, staffed by the Sisters of St. Francis of Lafayette.

== Present church ==
The present church was built by Rev. Matthew E. Campion between 1870 and 1873. Bishop John Henry Luers laid the cornerstone on June 15, 1870. The oratory is classified as "an inactive parish".

=== Architecture ===
It is a rectangular, Victorian Gothic style brick church. It has a gable roof and features a square bell tower, five tall pointed arched windows, and a half-octagonal apse flanked by lower, half-hipped sacristies. It is constructed of brick brought by canal boat from Huntington.

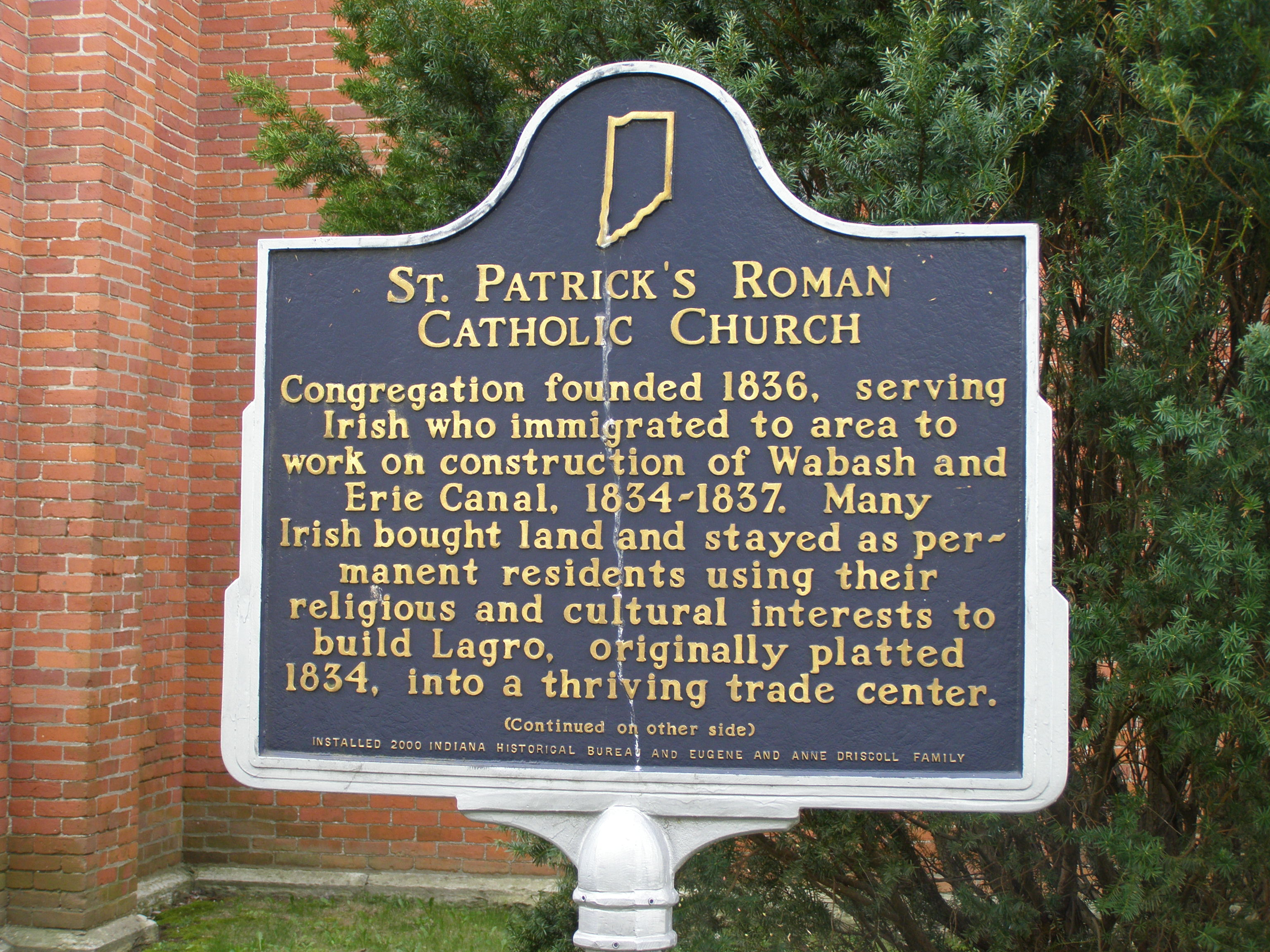
St Patrick, (Lagro)

Rev. John Grogan, pastor from 1873 until 1882, placed oak pews in the church, a communion railing of black walnut, a handsome pulpit, and a walnut stairway to the gallery, carved by the parishioners. Grogan also had the church frescoed.

The pipe organ is an 1800 Erben, purchased for $700 by Rev. Patrick F. Roche, who served from 1884 1888.

It was listed on the National Register of Historic Places in 1999.

== See also ==
- Masonic Temple (Lagro, Indiana)
- Red Men Hall (Lagro, Indiana)
