= James Hollis =

American Jungian psychoanalyst, author, and public speaker

- Born: Springfield, Illinois, USA
- Occupations: Jungian psychoanalyst, writer; prev. lecturer in Humanities
- Spouse: Jill Hollis
- Children: 3
- Website: www.jameshollis.net

James Hollis is an American Jungian psychoanalyst, author, and public speaker. He is based in Washington, D.C.

== Life and career ==
Hollis was born in Springfield, Illinois. He graduated from Manchester College (now Manchester University) in Indiana in 1962 with a Bachelor of Arts (BA) degree, and went on to obtain a PhD from Drew University in Madison, New Jersey, in 1967. For the first 26 years of his career, he taught Humanities at various colleges and universities, and between 1977 and 1982 he also trained as a Jungian psychoanalyst at the C. G. Jung Institute, Zürich in Switzerland.

Depth psychology understands that the goal of life is not happiness, which is only transiently possible anyhow, but meaning, which abides.

– Living Between Worlds.

He was Executive Director of the Jung Educational Center in Houston, Texas for many years and Executive Director of the Jung Society of Washington (JSW) until 2019. He also worked as a Senior Training Analyst for the Inter-Regional Society of Jungian Analysts, as a Director of Training of the Philadelphia Jung Institute, and is Vice-President Emeritus of the Philemon Foundation.

He runs a private practice as a Jungian psychoanalyst and lives and works in Washington, D.C., with his wife Jill, an artist and retired therapist, with whom he has three living children and several grand-children.

== Works ==
Hollis has written seventeen books based on personal insights and his work in Jungian analytical psychology:

- The Middle Passage: From Misery to Meaning in Mid-Life (1993)
- Under Saturn's Shadow: The Wounding and Healing of Men (1994)
- Tracking the Gods: The Place of Myth in Modern Life (1995)
- Swamplands of the Soul: New Life in Dismal Places (1996)
- The Eden Project: In Search of the Magical Other (1998)
- The Archetypal Imagination (2000)
- Creating a Life: Finding Your Individual Path (2000)
- On This Journey We Call Our Life: Living the Questions (2003)
- Mythologems: Incarnations of the Invisible World (2004)
- Finding Meaning in the Second Half of Life (2006)
- Why Good People Do Bad Things: Understanding Our Darker Selves (2007)
- What Matters Most: Living a More Considered Life (2009)
- Through The Dark Wood: Finding Meaning In The Second Half of Life (2009)
- Hauntings: Dispelling the Ghosts Who Run Our Lives (2013)
- Living an Examined Life: Wisdom for the Second Half of the Journey (2018)
- Living Between Worlds: Finding Personal Resilience in Changing Times (2020)
- The Broken Mirror: Refracted Visions of Ourselves (2022)
- A Life of Meaning: Relocating Your Center of Spiritual Gravity (2023)

== Interviews ==
- Vaughan, Alan G. (21 August 2014). "An Interview with James Hollis". Jung Journal: Culture & Psyche. Taylor & Francis Online. 8 (3): 119–130. doi:10.1080/19342039.2014.930631.
- Hollis, James (15 February 2018). "Living an Examined Life: The Book Brigade talks to Jungian analyst James Hollis, Ph.D". Psychology Today (Interview). Interviewed by The Book Brigade. Sussex Publishers.
- Hollis, James (March 2018). "'Living More Fully In The Shadow of Mortality' & 'Living The Examined Life: Steps To The Recovery Of A Personal Journey'" (Interview). Interviewed by Constance Avery-Clark. Center for Jungian Studies of South Florida.
- Hollis, James (29 December 2019). "An Interview With James Hollis". California Literary Review (Interview). Interviewed by Pat Dannenberg.
- Hollis, James (18 June 2020). "Episode 116 - Finding Resilience: A Conversation with Jim Hollis". This Jungian Life (Audio podcast). Interviewed by Joseph R. Lee; Lisa Marchiano; Deborah Stewart.
- Hollis, James (3 July 2020). "James Hollis Explores Healthier State of Mind Despite Media Overload - Variety". Variety (Interview). Interviewed by Steven Gaydos. Variety Media, LLC. (Penske Media Corporation).

== Reception ==
=== What Matters Most ===
Writing in The Guardian, Oliver Burkeman describes the author as "a total downer", but advises the reader "[not to] interpret What Matters Most as self-help cheesiness. This blunt and refreshing work by a follower of Jung is a radical and humbling way of thinking about psychology." Burkeman points to "the one-star Amazon reviews of his books [which] are full of people furious at his refusal to offer cheery reassurance or a one-size-fits-all recipe for happiness," and he agrees that "[a]s a teenager or young adult, I suspect I'd have been equally annoyed. But I discovered Hollis at the right time, a few years back, and his writing was a bracing draught of reality, a rousing slap in the face, a wake-up call – pick your metaphor, but What Matters Most was what I needed."

=== Living Between Worlds ===
Steven Gaydos, interviewing Hollis for Variety magazine writes: "Living Between Worlds ... is a terrific place to start digging into Hollis' sage counseling, packed as it is with his trademark bracing, no-punches-pulled observations about what he sees as the increasingly perilous state of modern life." The reviewer continues: "Hollis travels the Jungian path in his fundamental belief that modernity may have infinite comforts and distractions, but nothing can or will replace the certainty about our place in the world that disappeared in the 19th century."

Gaydos quotes the author, who writes in Living Between Worlds: "our culture's treatment plans for the absence of a personal, intimate relationship with the gods are materialism, hedonism, narcissism and nationalism, as well as a coursing nostalgia for a world that never really existed. Our contemporary Odysseys are redirected to the Apple Store, the palliative pharmacy, or forays along the River Amazon Prime. Guided by Google, whereby all things are knowable, we wonder why we are so absent-spirited, so lost, and so adrift. We may say that these secular surrogates, these 'isms,' constitute our values, our de facto religions, those in which we most invest our energies. But we have to ask the obvious question, 'How well are they working for us?'" To which the reviewer concludes: "The short answer to that question, derived from Hollis' 40 years as a therapist, clearly is 'Not that well.'"

=== Other reviews ===
Robertson, Robin (16 August 2006). "A Review of: 'A Guide to the Books of James Hollis'". Psychological Perspectives. 49 (1). Taylor & Francis Online: 141–148. doi:10.1080/00332920600734683. S2CID 143851783. Archived from the original on 20 August 2020.

== See also ==
- Depth psychology
