= Kenneth Brown (academic) =

American academic

Kenneth Lee Brown (June 15, 1933 – November 3, 2010) was an American academic credited with pioneering and heading the first undergraduate peace studies program in the United States. Brown chaired the Peace Studies Institute and Program in Conflict Resolution at Manchester College in Indiana from 1980 until 2005. Brown received the 2005 lifetime Achievement Award from the Peace and Justice Studies Association*. The peace studies major, the first of its field in the United States, had originally been established in 1948. Brown was also an ordained minister within the Church of the Brethren.

Brown retired in 2006, but continued to teach as a professor emeritus. A resident of North Manchester, Indiana, Brown died of vasculitis on November 3, 2010, at the age of 77. He was survived by his wife, Viona, and three children, Christopher, Katy, and Michael.

Brown's sermons, speeches, papers, pamphlets, letters, reflections, and satirical pieces have been made available to the public in the PALNI Digital Library Collections http://palni.contentdm.oclc.org/cdm/landingpage/collection/p15705coll26 Documents from 1956, when Brown was a student at Bethany Theological Seminary to 2008, when he spoke at a reception celebrating the sixtieth anniversary of peace studies at Manchester College (now: Manchester University) are included in the collection.
