= Ken Brown =

Ken Brown or Kenny Brown may refer to:

== Arts and entertainment ==
- Ken Brown (filmmaker) (born 1944), American filmmaker, photographer, cartoonist, and designer
- Ken Brown (musician) (1940–2010), English guitarist for The Quarrymen
- Bundy K. Brown, also known as Ken Brown, American multi-instrumentalist and founding member of Tortoise
- Kenny Brown (guitarist) (born 1953), American blues guitarist

== Sport ==
=== American football ===
- Ken Brown (linebacker) (born 1971), American football player
- Ken Brown (wide receiver) (born 1965), American football player
- Ken Brown (running back) (1945–2001), American football running back
- Ken Brown (offensive lineman) (born 1954), American football offensive lineman

=== Association football ===
- Ken Brown (footballer) (born 1934), England and West Ham United football player, later Norwich City manager
- Kenny Brown (footballer, born 1952), English footballer, see Barnsley F.C.
- Kenny Brown (footballer) (born 1967), English former professional footballer
- Kenny Browne (born 1986), Irish football defender most prominently associated with Waterford F.C.

=== Other sports ===
- Ken Brown (golfer) (born 1957), Scottish golfer and BBC golf broadcaster
- Ken Brown (ice hockey) (1948–2022), Canadian ice hockey player
- Ken Brown (basketball) (born 1989), American basketball player

== See also ==
- Kenneth Brown (disambiguation)
