= Hans Sebald =

American sociologist (1929–2002)

Hans Sebald was Professor of Sociology at Arizona State University. Sebald taught courses in the sociology of youth and social psychology, but was perhaps best known for his work on witchcraft. He was born in Selb, Germany, but came to the United States in 1954 to attend Manchester University in Indiana, from which he received a bachelor's degree cum laude in 1958. He earned a master's degree in 1959 and a doctorate degree in 1963 from Ohio State University, and taught at Arizona State University from 1963 until 1992. He became a naturalized U.S. citizen in 1968.

Sebald frequently spent summers doing research on witchcraft in Bavarian Switzerland, where a grandmother had been a practicing witch. His 1978 book, Witchcraft: The Heritage of a Heresy, was produced as a result of this research.

Sebald was a member of the Phoenix Skeptics, and spoke to that group about witchcraft on a number of occasions.

== Books ==
- Adolescence: A Sociological Analysis, 1968
- Momism: The Silent Disease of America, 1976 (Dutch edition, 1979; Greek edition, 1990)
- Witchcraft: The Heritage of a Heresy, 1978
- Witch-Children: From Salem Witch Hunts to Modern Courtrooms, 1995

== Selected articles ==
- "Channeling: Believe It or Not," Phoenix Skeptics News vol. 1, no. 3, November/December 1987, pp. 2–4.
- "On the distinction between nonbelief and disbelief," Phoenix Skeptics News vol. 1, no. 3, November/December 1987, pp. 4–5.
