= Manchester University (Indiana) =

Brethren university in North Manchester, Indiana, US

Coordinates: 41°00′40″N 85°45′45″W

- Former name: Manchester College (1860–2012)
- Motto: Learning, Faith and Service
- Type: Private Coeducational Liberal arts
- Established: 1860; 166 years ago
- Affiliations: Church of the Brethren
- Endowment: $82.8 million (2025)
- President: Dr. Stacy Young
- Academic staff: 96
- Students: 1,175
- Location: Main Campus: North Manchester, Graduate & Health Sciences: Fort Wayne, Indiana, United States
- Campus: Small Town: 200 Acres (0.506 km²)
- Athletics: NCAA Division III — HCAC
- Colors: Black and Gold
- Mascot: Spartans
- Website: manchester.edu

Manchester University (formerly Manchester College) is a private liberal arts university associated with the Church of the Brethren and two locations, a residential campus in North Manchester, Indiana, and a second location in Fort Wayne, Indiana, which hosts the university's doctorate programs in pharmacy; master's programs in pharmacogenomics, athletic training, and nutrition and nutrigenomics; and an accelerated second degree program in nursing. Total enrollment is approximately 1,200 students.

== History ==
History at a glance
Manchester University
Roanoke Classical Seminary	Established	1860
Location	Roanoke, Indiana, USA
Affiliation	United Brethren Church
Acquired	1885 Church of the Brethren
Affiliation	Church of the Brethren
Manchester College	Renamed	1889
Relocated	1889
Location	North Manchester, IN, USA
Affiliation	Church of the Brethren
Acquired	1932 Mount Morris College
Manchester University	Renamed	2012
Location	North Manchester, Indiana, USA and Fort Wayne, Indiana, USA

Mount Morris College
Rock River Seminary & College Institute	Established	1839
Location	Mount Morris, Illinois, USA
Affiliation	Methodist Church
Mount Morris College	Renamed	1844
Acquired	1879 Church of the Brethren
Affiliation	Church of the Brethren
Closed	1932

Manchester University (formerly Manchester College) was founded in Roanoke, Indiana, as the Roanoke Classical Seminary in 1860 by the United Brethren Church. David N. Howe served as the last president of Roanoke Classical Seminary, which was moved to North Manchester to become North Manchester [Manchester] College. He served as Manchester College's first president from 1889 to 1894 and is known as the founder. The school was renamed Manchester College in 1889 when it moved to North Manchester. In 1932, Manchester merged with Mount Morris College of Mount Morris, Illinois, a Methodist seminary founded in 1839. Manchester is a college of the Church of the Brethren.

The Peace Studies Institute and Program for Conflict Resolution—the first undergraduate peace studies major in the U.S., was established at Manchester in 1948. The program was chaired by Kenneth Brown from 1980 until 2005.

The Manchester College Historic District was listed on the National Register of Historic Places in 1990.

In 2012, Manchester changed its name from Manchester College to Manchester University to reflect the growing number of graduate programs offered. Manchester also expanded & opened its second location featuring its state-of-the-art pharmacy school in Fort Wayne, Indiana, in 2012. Manchester is the first university to offer a master's degree program in pharmacogenomics.

== Academics ==
Manchester University operates on a 4-1-4 (four month semester- January Session- four month semester) academic calendar in its College of Undergraduate Studies. Students working toward a bachelor's degree can choose from seventy-eight major fields of study and thirty-four minor fields. Students working toward an associate degree can choose from two major fields of study. Manchester also offers master's degrees in five fields of study and a doctorate degree in pharmacy.

=== Accreditation ===
Manchester University as a whole has been accredited by The Higher Learning Commission continuously since 1932 and was a member of the North Central Association of Colleges and Schools prior to its dissolution in 2014.

=== Department of History and Political Science ===
The Department of History and Political Science is one of the oldest and most prestigious programs of study at Manchester, housing the Mock Trial and Model United Nations organizations. Well-known graduates include G. John Ikenberry, Albert G. Milbank Professor of Politics and International Affairs at Princeton University's Woodrow Wilson School of Public and International Affairs, and co-faculty director of the Princeton Project on National Security; and Steven A. Shull, '65, university research professor at the University of New Orleans. Distinguished faculty have included Professor of Political Science Robert Johansen (Class of 1962; faculty 1967–74), founding Fellow of the Kroc Institute for International Peace Studies at the University of Notre Dame and president of the World Policy Institute (1978–1982); and Professor of Medieval History Andrew Cordier (Class of 1922; faculty 1926–1944), one of the co-founders of the United Nations and president of Columbia University (1968–1970).

Manchester benefited from Cordier's faculty position as, through its relationship with him, Manchester also became the only college in the United States to hold NGO status with the United Nations, a distinction Manchester still holds. This has allowed the institution to attract a number of renowned public figures and policy makers to its campus, including Eleanor Roosevelt, Martin Luther King Jr., Barry Goldwater, Ralph Nader, and Jesse Jackson.

== Campus ==
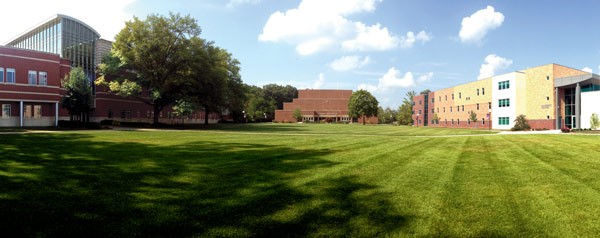
A view across Manchester University's mall on its North Manchester campus

All students classified as first-years, sophomores, or juniors must live on campus unless they live within 40 miles of Manchester University with their parents or are married. There are no fraternities or sororities at Manchester, and the university is a partially dry campus with alcohol being permitted at certain events.

Manchester University has five residence halls:

- East Hall is a traditional-style hall that houses up to 224 students and is primarily for second-year students. East Hall consists of the campus' gender neutral housing.
- Garver Hall is a traditional-style hall that houses up to 275 men and women with a majority of the hall being restricted to first-year students.
- Helman Hall is a suite-style hall that houses up to 129 men and women classified as sophomores, juniors, or seniors.
- Oakwood Hall is a suite-style hall that houses up to 129 men and women classified as sophomores, juniors, or seniors.
- East Street Apartments houses students classified as sophomores, juniors, or seniors, with priority given to seniors.

Students in their senior year are permitted to live off campus, and often live in named, themed houses that may persist through several years of occupants.

Manchester also offers more than thirty student clubs and organizations.

=== Service ===
In 2012–13, Manchester students contributed over 47,000 hours of community service, earning the university a spot on the president's Higher Education Community Service Honor Roll for the fifth-straight year. The university's chapter of Indiana Reading Corps is one of the largest in the state, logging more than 3,000 hours tutoring elementary school children. Habitat for Humanity also is a major recipient of campus service.

Washington Monthly magazine ranks Manchester 14th among the nation's baccalaureate colleges for its “contribution to the public good.”

=== Buildings ===
The university president's residence, named Tall Oaks, is located on the North end of campus and is passed on from president to president.

The principal nonresidential buildings on the campus of Manchester University are:

- Science Center
- Funderburg Library
- Cunningham Academic Center (ACEN)
- Clark Computer Center
- Otho Winger Memorial Hall
- Physical Education and Recreation Center (PERC)
- Calvin Ulrey Hall
- Charles S. Morris Observatory
- Jo Young Switzer Center (formerly Student Union) (JYSC)
- Cordier Auditorium
- Petersime Chapel
- Chinworth Center
- Jean Childs Young Multicultural Center and Toyota Round (JCYMC)

Note: The Academic Center is a renovation of the former Holl-Kintner Hall, and contains classrooms, faculty offices and an admissions Welcome Center.

Note: The Administration Building was razed in 2022.

== Athletics ==
Manchester Spartans wordmark

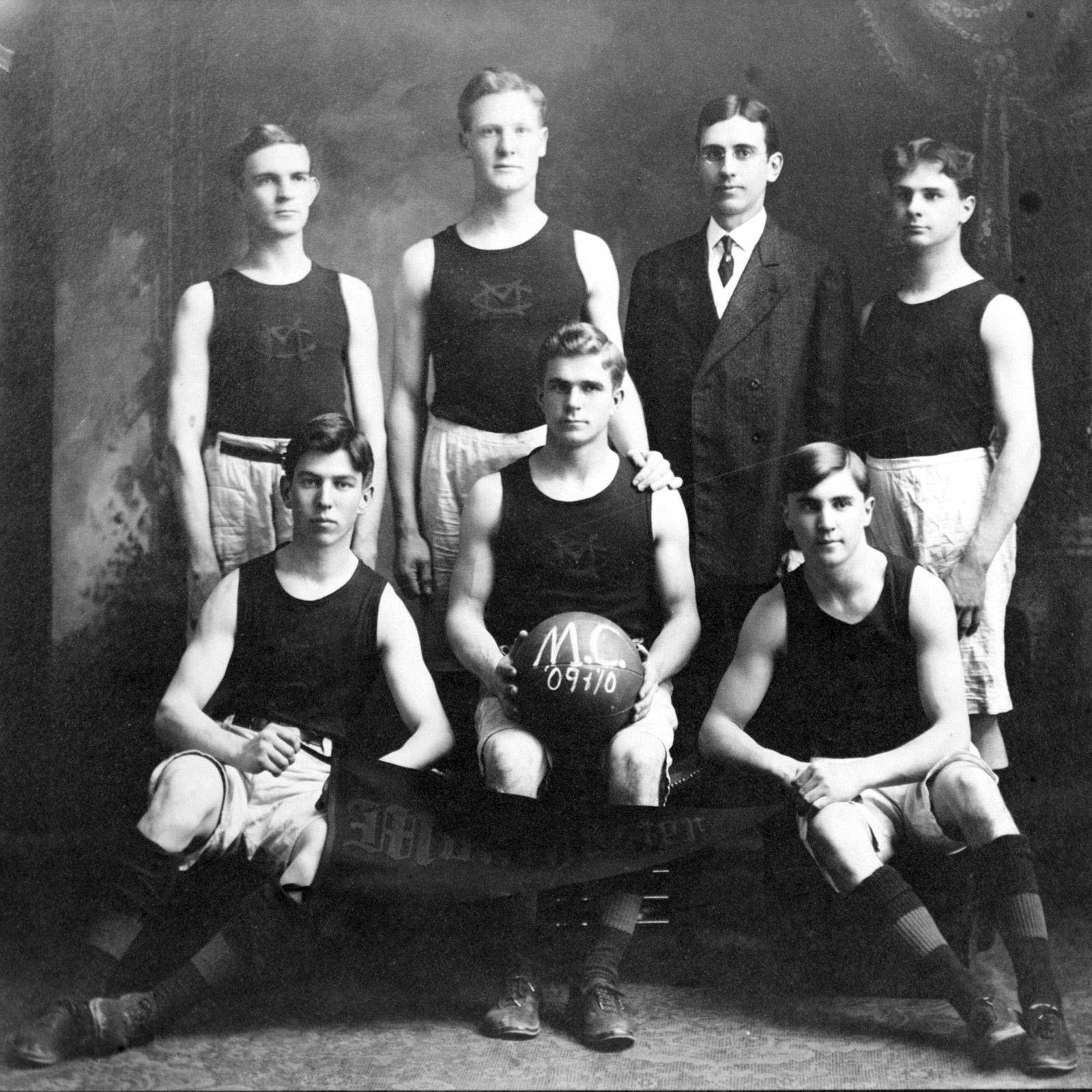
Manchester basketball team of 1910

Manchester University teams (nicknamed Spartans) participate as a member of the National Collegiate Athletic Association's Division III.

The Spartans are a member of the Heartland Collegiate Athletic Conference (HCAC). Men's sports include swimming, diving, baseball, basketball, cross country, football, soccer, tennis, track & field and wrestling; while women's sports include swimming, diving, basketball, cross country, golf, soccer, softball, tennis, track & field, wrestling, cheer and volleyball.

A burgeoning esports team began intercollegiate play in 2020 and competes in the National Association of Collegiate Esports (NACE) and the Great Lakes Esports Conference (GLEC).

== Notable faculty ==
- Kenneth Brown, professor of Philosophy and Peace Studies and recipient of the 2005 lifetime Achievement Award from the Peace and Justice Studies Association.*

== Notable alumni ==
- Myrl E. Alexander, former director of U.S. prison system and leading innovator in penal reforms, recipient of President's Award for Distinguished Federal Civilian Service
- Herb Banet, NFL player
- Roy Blough, former director of the U.N. economic affairs department, member of President Truman's Council of Economic Advisers
- Andrew W. Cordier, U.N. official
- Mike DeBord, NFL coach
- Donald F. Durnbaugh, professor and author of church history, moderator of Church of the Brethren annual conference, editor of the Brethren Encyclopedia
- Martin Ellis, organist
- Mike Emrick, announcer, honored by the Hockey Hall of Fame
- Paul Flory, Nobel Prize winner in polymer chemistry
- Jane E. Henney, first female commissioner of the Food and Drug Administration (FDA)
- James Hollis, Jungian analyst and author
- Kyle Hupfer, Indiana Republican Party Chairman
- G. John Ikenberry, Albert G. Milbank Professor of Politics and International Affairs at Princeton University's Woodrow Wilson School of Public and International Affairs, and co-faculty director of the Princeton Project on National Security
- Carol Karp, mathematician
- J. Gordon Keever, former Assistant Treasurer at NCR Corporation and co-founder of the Business Executives Institute
- Mike Kelly, former University of Dayton Head Football Coach, 2011 NCAA College Football Hall of Fame inductee
- Sarah Kurtz, solar cell engineer
- Cary D. Landis, 25th Florida Attorney General
- Gene Likens, identified acid rain in North America
- John Longfellow, noted college and IHSAA basketball coach; NAIA National Champion, 1951 Pan-Am Games Gold Medal-winning coach
- Terry Pettit, volleyball coach
- Roy J. Plunkett, inventor of Teflon
- Frederick Rakestraw, Justice of the Indiana Supreme Court
- Hans Sebald, sociologist
- Ted Studebaker, pacifist and activist
- Dan West, founder of Heifer International
- Paul K. Weimer, electrical engineer
