= Herb Banet =

American football player (1913–2003)

Herbert Charles Banet
No. 21
- Position: Halfback

Personal information
- Born: October 17, 1913; Fort Wayne, Indiana, US
- Died: March 12, 2003 (aged 89); Fort Wayne, Indiana, US
- Listed height: 6 ft 2 in (1.88 m)
- Listed weight: 200 lb (91 kg)

Career information
- High school: South Side High
- College: Manchester University

Career history
- Green Bay Packers (1937)

Career Green Bay Packers statistics as of 1937
- Games Started: 2
- Total Rush Attempts: 9
- Total Rushing Yards: 28
- Stats at Pro Football Reference

Herb Banet
Career history

Coaching
- Central High School, Fort Wayne

Career highlights
- 1960 Indiana High School Final Four
- Basketball Hall of Fame

Herbert Charles Banet (October 17, 1913 – March 12, 2003) was an American football player in the National Football League and high school basketball coach, teacher, and guidance counselor.

== Biography ==
Banet was born October 17, 1913, in Fort Wayne, Indiana.

== Football career ==
Banet played with the Green Bay Packers during the 1937 NFL season. He played at the collegiate level at Manchester University.

== Basketball career ==
Banet was a head basketball coach and teacher at Central High School in Fort Wayne. He was an inductee of the Indiana Basketball Hall of Fame.

== Personal and later life ==
Banet served in the United States Navy during the World War II era. He was married to Kathlyn Maude Stevens (1916–2001), and together they had four children: Stevens, David, Thomas, and Sarah. Banet became a guidance counselor at Northrup High School and retired in 1979. He died March 12, 2003, at Renaissance Village and is buried at Falls Memorial Gardens in Wabash, Indiana.
