= Thomas R. Marshall School =

- U.S. National Register of Historic Places
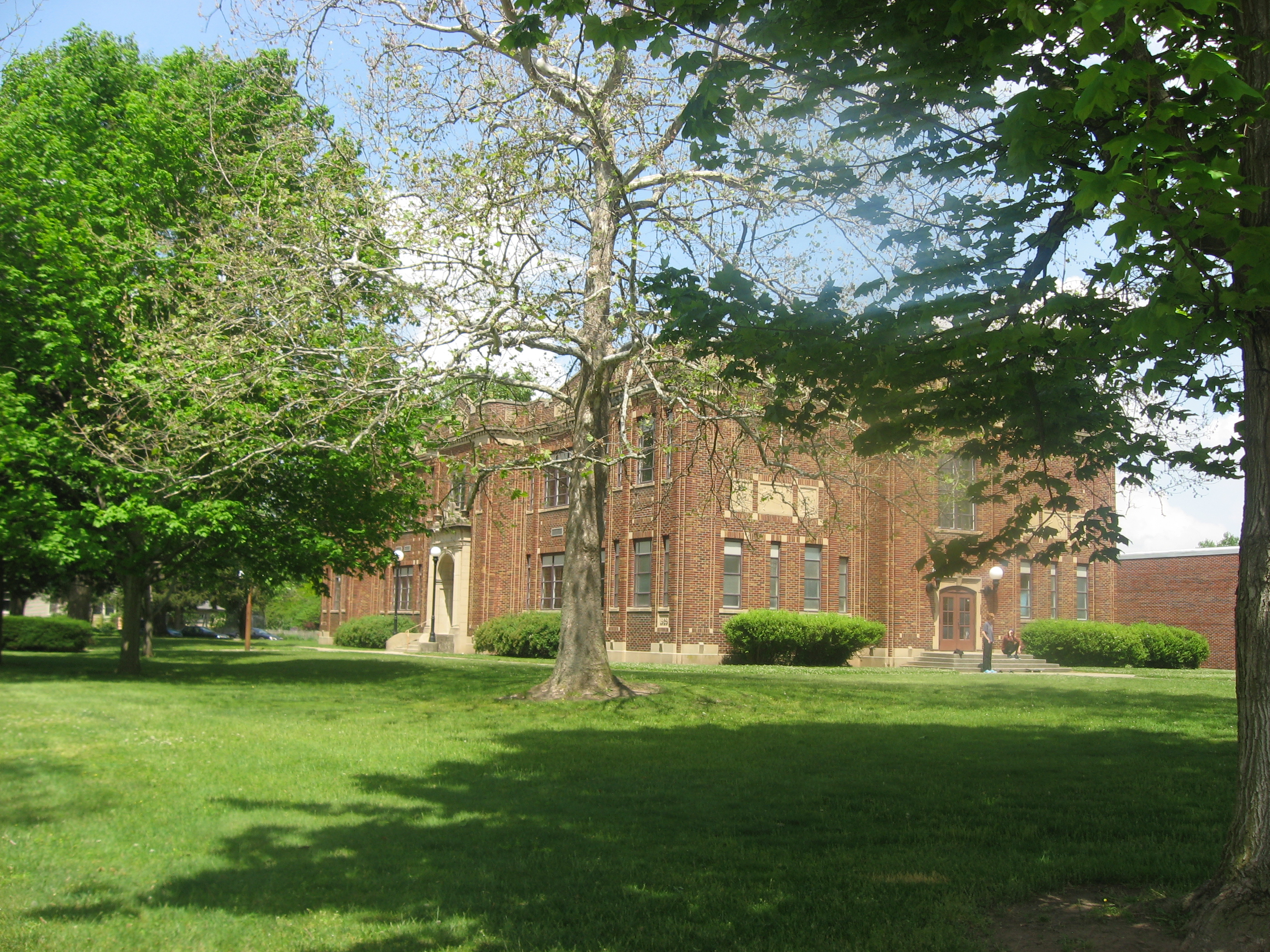
- Thomas R. Marshall School, May 2012

- Location within Indiana Location within the United States
- Location: 603 Bond St., North Manchester, Indiana
- Coordinates: 41°0′19″N 85°45′45″W
- Area: less than one acre
- Built: 1929
- Architect: Henkel & Hanson
- Architectural style: Beaux Arts
- NRHP reference No.: 04000206
- Added to NRHP: March 22, 2004

Thomas R. Marshall School, also known as the Town Life Center, is a historic school building located at North Manchester, Indiana. It was built in 1929, and is a two-story, rectangular, Beaux-Arts style multicolored brick building. It has a projecting center entrance bay with a recessed entrance behind a shallow barrel vault. The school was named for Indiana Governor and U.S. Vice President Thomas R. Marshall (1854–1925). It remained in use as an elementary school until 1989, after which it has been used as a community centre.

It was listed on the National Register of Historic Places in 2004.
