= Kenneth Brown (journalist) =

American author and journalist

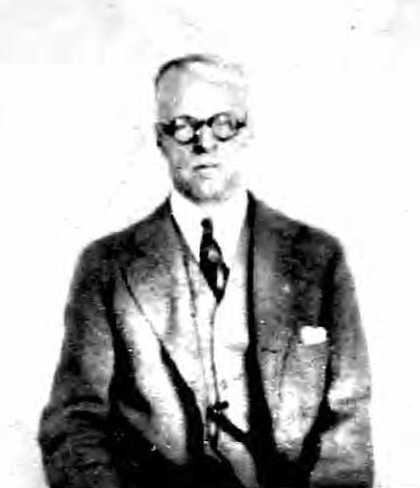
- Born: 9 March 1868; Chicago
- Died: 5 May 1958 (aged 90); Ivy
- Alma mater: Harvard University; University of Virginia
- Occupation: Journalist, writer
- Spouse(s): Demetra Kenneth Brown

Kenneth Brown (March 9, 1868 – May 5, 1958) was an American journalist and writer. Brown was born in Chicago, Illinois to parents, Franklin B. and Caroline Frothingham (Morrill) Brown. He attended the University of Virginia for a short time, and he attended Harvard University for five years.

Brown worked in the newspaper business as a reporter, and editorial writer in Boston, New York, Baltimore and Chicago, and published numerous articles in popular magazines such as The Green Book Magazine, Munsey's Magazine, and Watson's Magazine. Brown published several books, and co-authored others with his wife and his brother-in-law.

== Biography ==
Brown studied under private tutors in Germany, Switzerland, and Paris. He attended the University of Virginia for a short time, and attended Harvard University for five years, where he studied primarily, English and athletics. There is no record that he received a degree from Harvard, however, LeBaron Russell Briggs made an impact on his life; when Brown wrote his book, Putter Perkins, he dedicated his book to Briggs, writing:

To L. B. R. BRIGGS

Dear Mr. Briggs, Not very long after I left college I wrote a little book, and dedicated it to you. It was called "Contrariwise," and sparkled with the promise of youth, and contained that gem of mine, which you cannot have forgotten, "The Compressed Vacuum Pill. " Some day I may yet find a publisher who has courage to print it; but publishers are timid men, and all this time you have never known that I had written a book which I had dedicated to you.

"Putter Perkins," a staid and scientific chronicle, has found more favor with the publishing men, and so I am dedicating it to you now in place of the little volume which still lies darkly sparkling in the bottom of my trunk — like a diamond undiscovered in the depths of a diamond mine.

— Kenneth Brown

For some years he was in newspaper work in Boston, New York, Baltimore, and Chicago. He worked for a short time at The Boston Journal in 1891, and later at the New York Herald and Baltimore News. He left the newspaper business and became involved in raising thoroughbred horses, in Virginia, until 1896.

From 1896 through 1897, Brown worked as a reporter for the Chicago Inter Ocean, leaving to serve as an editorial writer in New York, for the Commercial Advertiser until 1900.

On April 21, 1904, Brown married Demetra Vaka, a Greek, who had come to America at the age of 17. In 1917 he went with his wife to study the Greek situation during World War I. Together they interviewed several leaders including Constantine I of Greece and Eleftherios Venizelos, the Greek politician. Afterwards, they published In Pawn to a Throne, in 1919, the seventh book that he had authored or co-authored. In 1921, they wrote a series of articles on Turkey.

From 1903 through 1915, Brown wrote short stories and articles that were published in several magazines such as, The Redbook magazine, The Green Book Magazine, Munsey's Magazine, Watson's Magazine, Ainslee's Magazine, The Popular Magazine and Appleton's Booklovers Magazine.

Brown founded a magazine, The Magpie, described as "an aesthetic little magazine" in the book, American Little Magazines of the Fin de Siecle.

== Bibliography ==
A number of books and articles, published by Brown, is listed below. A collection of his letters, photographs, clippings and miscellaneous articles are available at the Albert and Shirley Small Special Collections Library at the University of Virginia, Charlottesville.

=== Books ===
- Eastover Court House, co-authored with his brother-in-law, Henry Burnham Boone, Harper & Brothers, 1901.
- The Redfields Succession, co-authored with his brother-in-law, Henry Burnham Boone, Harper & Brothers, 1903.
- Sirocco, Mitchell Kennerly,1906.
- The First Secretary, co-authored with his wife, Demetra Kenneth Brown, B.W. Dodge & Company, 1907.
- The Duke's Price, co-authored with his wife, Demetra Kenneth Brown, Houghton Mifflin Company, 1910.
- Two Boys in a Gyrocar: the story of a New York to Paris motor race, Houghton Mifflin Company, 1911. (juvenile audience)
- In Pawn to a Throne, co-authored with his wife, Demetra Kenneth Brown, Butterick Publishing Company, 1919.
- Putter Perkins, Houghton Mifflin Company, 1923.

=== Short stories and articles ===
- "When a Queen Loved Duncan," a short story, Munsey's Magazine, November 1903, p. 253.
- "The Somersault Tong," lead story, The Red Book Magazine, April 1904.
- "Politics and Aniseed," a story, Appleton's Booklovers Magazine, March 1906, Vol. 7, No. 3, p. 347.
- "Duncan and the Suffolk Superbs," Watson's Magazine, December 1906, p. 236.
- "The Great "Boo" Match," Ainslee's Magazine, August 1909, Vol. 24, No. 1.
- "The Bump of Destiny," The Red Book Magazine, September 1909.
- "But When She Fell in Love," The Green Book Magazine, May 1915.
- "The Racing of King's Grant," The Popular Magazine, June 7, 1915.
