= Demetra Kenneth Brown =

Greek-American author

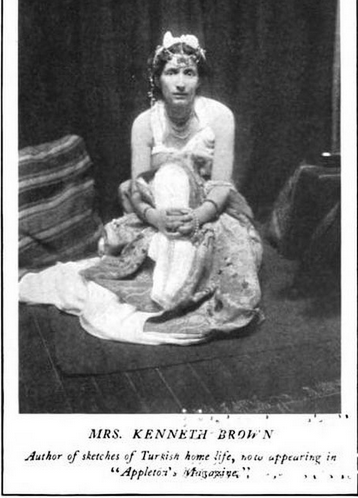
Demetra Kenneth Brown, from a 1907 publication.

Demetra Kenneth Brown (February 28, 1877 – December 17, 1946) was a Greek-American author.

== Life ==
Brown was born as Demetra Vaka on the island of Bouyouk Ada, Sea of Marmora. Her early life was passed in close touch with the Turkish people. She ran away from home to escape an arranged marriage, and came to the United States with the family of a relative. She joined the staff of the Greek newspaper Atlantis in New York City, but after six months of this, she gave up journalism and became a teacher of French at the Comstock School (New York), where she remained until 1903, except for a brief interval in 1901 when she returned to Turkey for a visit. In 1904 she was married to Kenneth Brown, novelist, and soon began to write. Her second book, Haremlik, published in 1909, commanded wide attention. It consisted of 10 studies of Turkish women. A Child of the Orient (1914) relates the story of the author's own childhood.

Brown died in 1946.

== Works include ==
- The First Secretary (1907), in collaboration with her husband
- Some Pages from the Life of Turkish Women (1909)
- The Duke's Price (1910), in collaboration with her husband
- Finella in Fairyland (1910)
- In the Shadow of Islam (1911)
- The Grasp of the Sultan (1916)
- The Heart of the Balkans (1917)
- In the Heart of German Intrigue (1918), which grew out of interviews with King Constantine
