= Manchester Historic District (Manchester, Connecticut) =

Historic district in Connecticut, United States

- U.S. National Register of Historic Places
- U.S. Historic district
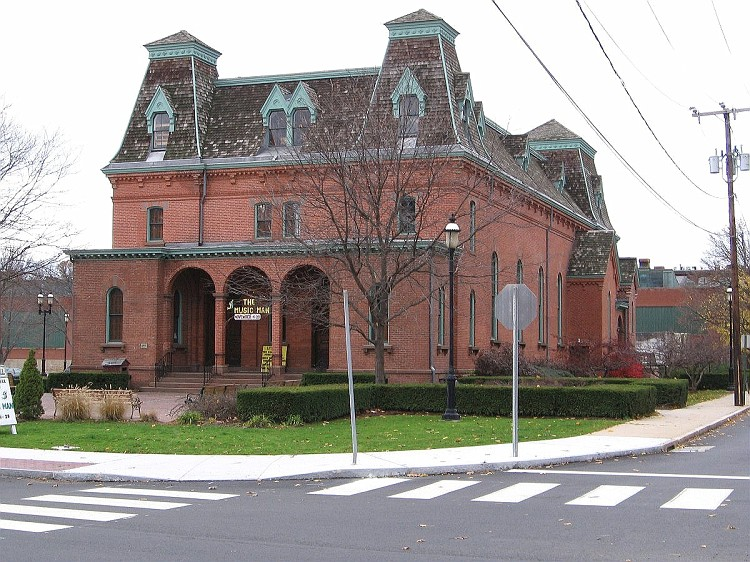
- Cheney Hall

- Location within Connecticut Location within the United States
- Location: Roughly bounded by Center Spring Park, Main Street, Interstate 384, and Campfield Road, Manchester, Connecticut
- Coordinates: 41°46′12″N 72°31′42″W
- Area: 500 acres (200 ha)
- Architect: Charles Adams Platt; et.al.
- Architectural style: Gothic Revival, Late Victorian, et.al.
- NRHP reference No.: 00000857
- Added to NRHP: August 2, 2000

The Manchester Historic District encompasses a historic planned industrial and residential area of Manchester, Connecticut. Located west of the town's Main Street area, the district includes most of the Cheney Brothers Historic District, a National Historic Landmark District covering the silk manufacturing mills, worker housing, and owner residences of the Cheney family, as well as other surrounding residential areas related to the growth and development of Manchester under the Cheney's influence. The district was listed on the National Register of Historic Places in 2000.

== Description and history ==
The town of Manchester was settled in the 17th century, but it remained basically agricultural until the 19th century. In 1838 the Cheney family established a silk processing business that came to dominate the town's economy for more than a century. The Cheneys basically built up a company town, providing housing and other amenities for its workers. The built churches and schools, a water works that served both the mill and the surrounding town, The manufacturing complex at the center of this business is located west of Main Street and north of Interstate 384, and forms the core of the National Historic Landmark district. The estate houses of the Cheneys lie to the east, with what was originally company-owned housing just to the north and west.

The present historic district expands on the landmark district, mainly extending northward to Center Springs Park, which was created from land donated by the Cheneys and the Hillards, another prominent industrial family. The dominant element of this area is residential housing, which, most of which consists of one and two-family wood frame dwellings. Many of these are classifiable into a number of different vernacular forms and styles, and often have modest elements of styling. Late additions to the district include a series of apartment blocks on St. James Street and Garden Drive, built in 1944 to meet housing demand during World War II.

== See also ==
- National Register of Historic Places listings in Hartford County, Connecticut
