= Kenneth Brown (cricketer) =

South African cricketer (born 1967)

Personal information
- Born: 9 June 1967 (age 59); Queenstown, South Africa
- Source: Cricinfo, 6 December 2020

Kenneth Brown (born 9 June 1967) is a South African former cricketer. He played in one List A and two first-class matches from 1984/85 to 1992/93.
