= North Manchester Planing and Band Saw Mill =

- North Manchester Planing and Band Saw Mill (J.A. Browne Co. Mill)
- Formerly listed on the U.S. National Register of Historic Places
- Location: 705 W. Main St. (mill); (houses) 706-708 W. Grant St. and 202 N. High St., North Manchester, Indiana
- Area: 4 acres (1.6 ha)
- Built: 1876
- Built by: Eichholtz, George; Valenaire, John
- Architectural style: Mixed (more Than 2 Styles From Different Periods)
- NRHP reference No.: 82000052

Significant dates
- Added to NRHP: March 5, 1982
- Removed from NRHP: June 12, 1995

North Manchester Planing and Band Saw Mill (J.A. Browne Co. Mill) was a historic sawmill complex located at North Manchester, Indiana. The sawmill was built in 1876, and was a 1 1/2-story brick building. It was enlarged in 1898, to house the power station of the Browne-Mills Electric Company. Associated with the mill were three brick cottages built in the late-1870s for mill employees.

It was listed on the National Register of Historic Places in 1982, and delisted in 1995.
