= Kenneth Brown (interior designer) =

American interior designer and decorator

- Born: March 16, 1971 (age 55)
- Occupation: Interior Designer
- Years active: 1995–present
- Website: http://www.kennethbrowndesign.com/

Kenneth Brown (born March 16, 1971) is an American interior designer and decorator.

== Early life and background ==
Born and raised in Baton Rouge, Louisiana, Kenneth Brown attended Louisiana State University and graduated in 1995 with a degree in interior design.

== Career ==
=== Interior designer ===
Hailing from Louisiana, Kenneth Brown blends warm Southern hospitality with clean Southern-California lines. His creations reflect the belief that comfort holds the key to successful interior design. His visions are shaped by a passion for structure, use of rich color and delight in small details.

Kenneth Brown is known for his Southern charm and laid-back personality which puts homeowners at ease which creates a hands-on creative process. His direct collaboration with his clients allows them to put their own personal stamp on their homes. Kenneth has completed homes for celebrities such as Zac Efron, Vanessa Hudgens and Kristen Bell as well as sports figures Mia Hamm and Nomar Garciaparra. In addition to Kenneth Brown Designs residential portfolio, Kenneth has completed commercial projects such as A. Rudin's Los Angeles Flagship Showroom, Cedars-Sinai's Founders Room, Endeavor Talent Agency, Wood and Vine Restaurant, and Bar and hotel collaborations.

=== Philanthropy ===
"We believe in with connecting good design with a good cause by donating five percent of our profit to children's charities."

=== Television ===
His broad exposure and popularity from his own television shows on HGTV, TLC TV network, Fine Living Network, and led MSN.com to offer Kenneth the role of resident Interior Design Expert. In addition to this, American Express Open selected Kenneth to share his success story as part of their ongoing Iconic Open Forum Series. He has been named to the top 100 designers by House Beautiful and Western Interiors. He has appeared on The Today Show, The Tyra Banks Show, CNN, iVillage Live, Entertainment Tonight, Good Morning America and Fox Morning news.

Kenneth Brown provided kitchen design advice and inspiration to HGTV.com.

=== Media ===
2001, Brown appeared on HGTV's House Hunters. He later appeared on HGTV's Designer's Challenge, winning 5 out of the 6 times he appeared.

2004, Brown was featured in his own interior design show, called reDesign. As of 2007, he had completed 52 episodes.

2005 Oprah's "O" magazine featured Kenneth in the "Live Your Best Life Tour". Brown was listed as one of the top designers and architects by Western Interiors and Design magazine and was included in the top 100 list of American Interior Designers by House Beautiful magazine.

2007 CNN.com interviewed Kenneth. and American Express Open selected him to share his story as part of their ongoing Iconic Open Forum series.

2008, Kenneth completed filming of a new show for TLC, Over Design.

2009, The Chicago Tribune interviewed Kenneth about designing Zac Efron's home, living in Los Angeles, his TV design series and the Kenneth Brown product lines.

2010, Kenneth partnership with Summer Infant to launch a baby bedding at Babies R Us.

2011, Kenneth Brown Home opens.

2012, Brown opens design office in Baton Rouge, Louisiana.

2012, Brown was the featured speaker for Creative Louisiana and is interviewed by WRKF 89.3 where he discussed his interior design business, TV and why he opened a new office in Louisiana.

2015, Kenneth Brown Design completes a Fresh College Campus Loft at Baton Rouge .

2017, "To get a sense of his life down south, Architectural Digest shadowed the designer for a day."

2017 Wall Street Journal includes Brown in article: "A Home-Office Décor Problem That Almost Stumped Designers."
