= Peabody Memorial Tower =

Historic structure in New Manchester, Indiana, U.S.

- U.S. National Register of Historic Places
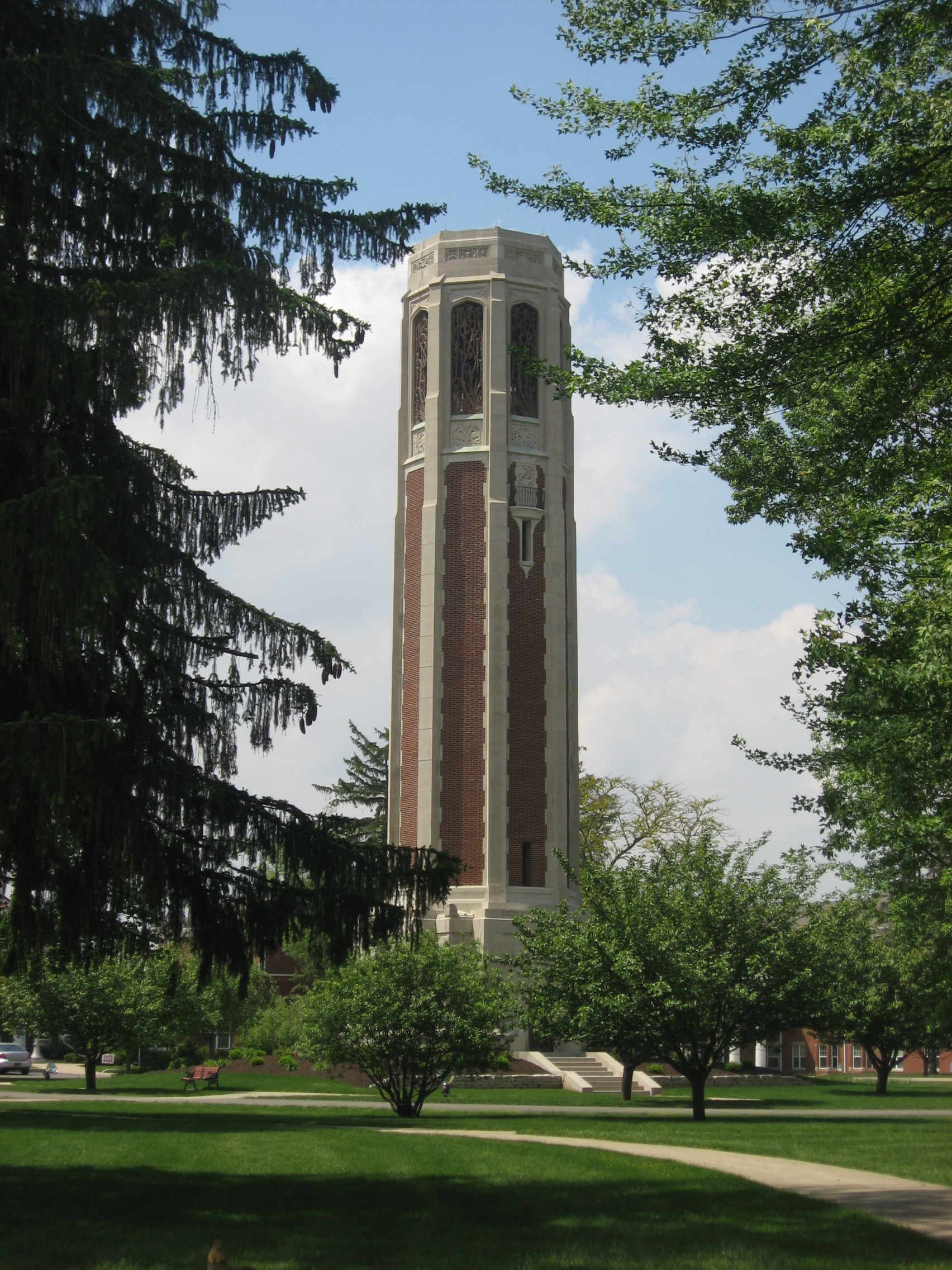
- Peabody Memorial Tower, May 2012

- Location within Indiana Location within the United States
- Location: 400 W 7th St, North Manchester, Indiana
- Coordinates: 41°0′22″N 85°46′33″W
- Area: less than one acre
- Built: 1937
- Architect: Weatherhogg, Charles R.
- Architectural style: Art Deco, Tudor Revival
- NRHP reference No.: 10000377
- Added to NRHP: June 24, 2010

Peabody Memorial Tower, also known as the Singing Tower, is a historic structure located at North Manchester, Indiana. It was designed by architect Charles R. Weatherhogg and built in 1937. The structure consists of a cube shaped limestone mausoleum at the base topped by a brick and limestone carillon that reaches 110 feet tall. It has streamlined Art Deco character with Tudor Revival features.

It was listed on the National Register of Historic Places in 2010.
