= Masonic Temple (Lagro, Indiana) =

Historic Masonic clubhouse in Indiana

- F. & A.M. Tuscan Lodge No. 143
- U.S. National Register of Historic Places
- Location within Indiana Location within the United States
- Location: 828 Washington Street, Lagro, Indiana 46941
- Coordinates: 40°50′11″N 85°43′40″W
- Built: 1913
- Architectural style: Classical Revival, Early Commercial
- Restored by: Lagro Canal Foundation
- NRHP reference No.: 100005869
- Added to NRHP: December 1, 2020

The Masonic Temple is a historic clubhouse in Lagro, Indiana completed in 1913. The National Register of Historic Places listed the masonic temple in 2020.

== History ==
On May 26, 1853, the Free and Accepted Masons chartered the Tuscan Lodge No. 143. In 1913, the group built a dedicated meeting space that would also provide rental income from retail businesses: the Citizens State Bank and the Lagro Hardware Company. Eventually, the hardware store closed in 1970 and the lodge disbanded in 1996.

Beginning in 2017, the volunteer-based Lagro Canal Foundation gradually rehabbed the building by recovering the roof, fixing the drainage, repointing the facade, and replacing exterior lighting. The group plans for historic preservation to encourage economic redevelopment. In 2021, the Wabash River Trail built a pavilion, firepit, and restrooms across from the building.

== Architecture ==
The 1913 building reflects both early commercial and classical revival architectural styles. The two-story structure consists of a street-level storefront: the former bank on the left and the hardware store on the right. The second level contains a one-bedroom apartment and meeting room for the lodge. The building shares a common wall with the Red Men Hall, forming a commercial block.

The brick facade has a cornice with dentil detailing along the roof. Each window is framed with limestone lintels and windowsills. An inlaid panel includes the Masonic square and compasses symbol. The former bank side has limestone Tuscan order pillars rising to a bulkhead with carved letters reading "19 Citizens State Bank 13". In contrast, the former hardware storefront is relatively simple.

== See also ==
- List of Masonic buildings in Indiana
- National Register of Historic Places listings in Wabash County, Indiana
