= Kenneth Browne (painter) =

American artist

Kenneth Browne is an African-American figurative painter working in Brooklyn. He was born in Hempstead, New York and lived for many years in Snow Hill, Maryland before returning to New York City to pursue his Master Degree.

== Early life and education ==
Browne graduated from Salisbury University in 2005 with a Bachelor of Science in Biology and a Bachelor of Arts in Studio Art. In 2007 he completed his Master of Fine Arts degree at Pratt Institute in Brooklyn. His day job is as an admission counsellor at Pratt Institute.

== Exhibitions and awards ==
Kenneth Browne has exhibited widely in the United States and has participated in many juried exhibitions. His work has been showcases at the online website of the Saatchi Gallery, and the Brooklyn Art Studios, in particular the Yashar Galleries. He has also exhibited in the Reeves Gallery in Chelsea, Manhattan.

Browne was invited to participate in the 2008 Biennial: Contemporary American Realism at the Fort Wayne Museum of Art. He won "best in show" at the Figurative Expo 2011 of the Infinity Art Gallery.
