= North Manchester Covered Bridge =

- U.S. National Register of Historic Places
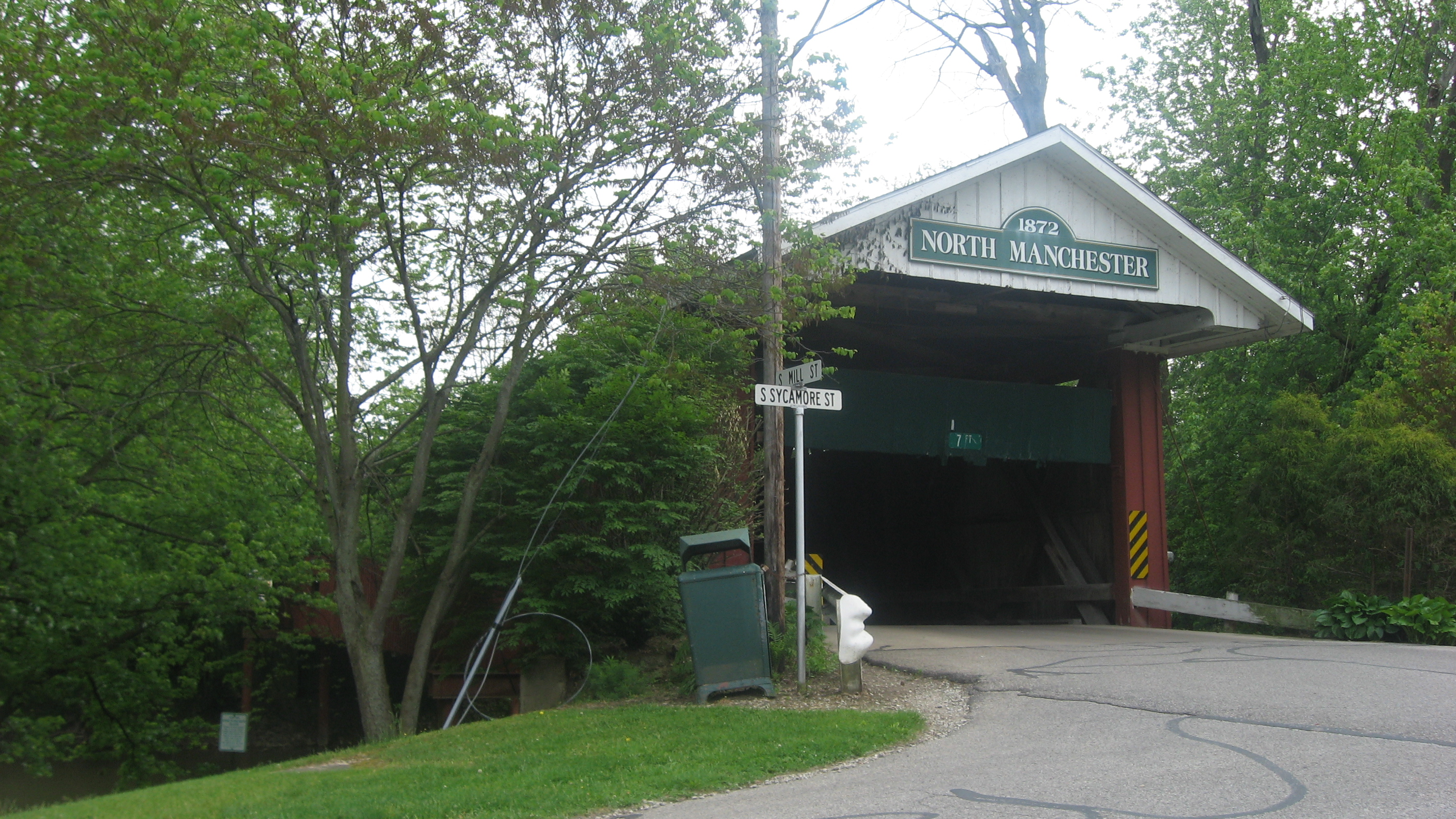
- North Manchester Covered Bridge, May 2012

- Location within Indiana Location within the United States
- Location: S. Mill St. at Eel River, North Manchester, Indiana
- Coordinates: 40°59′45″N 85°45′55″W
- Area: less than one acre
- Built: 1872
- Built by: Smith, Robert, W.
- Architectural style: Smith Type 4 Truss
- NRHP reference No.: 82000051
- Added to NRHP: September 30, 1982

North Manchester Covered Bridge is a historic Smith Type 4 Truss covered bridge located at North Manchester, Indiana. It was built in 1872 by the Smith Bridge Company of Toledo, Ohio and crosses the Eel River. It measures 150 feet long and is 18 feet wide. The bridge has painted board and batten siding.

It was listed on the National Register of Historic Places in 1982.
