= Red Men Hall (Lagro, Indiana) =

Historic clubhouse in Indiana

- I.O.R.M. Hall, Tonkawa No. 126
- U.S. National Register of Historic Places
- Location within Indiana Location within the United States
- Location: 820 Washington Street, Lagro, Indiana 46941
- Coordinates: 40°50′11″N 85°43′41″W
- Built: 1911
- Architectural style: Vernacular, Early Commercial
- Restored by: Lagro Canal Foundation
- NRHP reference No.: 100005871
- Added to NRHP: December 1, 2020

The Red Men Hall is a historic clubhouse in Lagro, Indiana, completed in 1911. The National Register of Historic Places listed the building in 2020.

== History ==
The Improved Order of Red Men is a fraternal organization that established a Lagro chapter or "tribe" in 1888 and named it after the Tonkawa people. The group's rituals are based on perceived Native American customs.

As of 1904, the local group had 41 members and, by 1911, was large enough to fund construction of a lodge building, called a "wigwam". However, by 1948, the declining lodge surrendered its charter.

Beginning in 2017, the volunteer-based Lagro Canal Foundation has gradually rehabbed the building by replacing the roof, restoring the facade, and removing debris from the interior. The group plans for historic preservation to encourage economic redevelopment.

== Architecture ==
The 1911 building reflects both vernacular and early commercial architectural styles. The two-story structure consists of a street-level storefront while the second level contains a meeting room for the lodge. The building shares a common wall with the Masonic Temple, forming a commercial block. The facade of the building is brick with three bays and an inlaid "IORM" detail. When the front facade was repointed in 2020, the locally sourced bricks were found to be a non-standard size, so replacements bricks were repurposed from the hidden side wall.

== See also ==
- List of Improved Order of Red Men buildings and structures
- National Register of Historic Places listings in Wabash County, Indiana
