= Lentz House (Hotel Sheller) =

- U.S. National Register of Historic Places
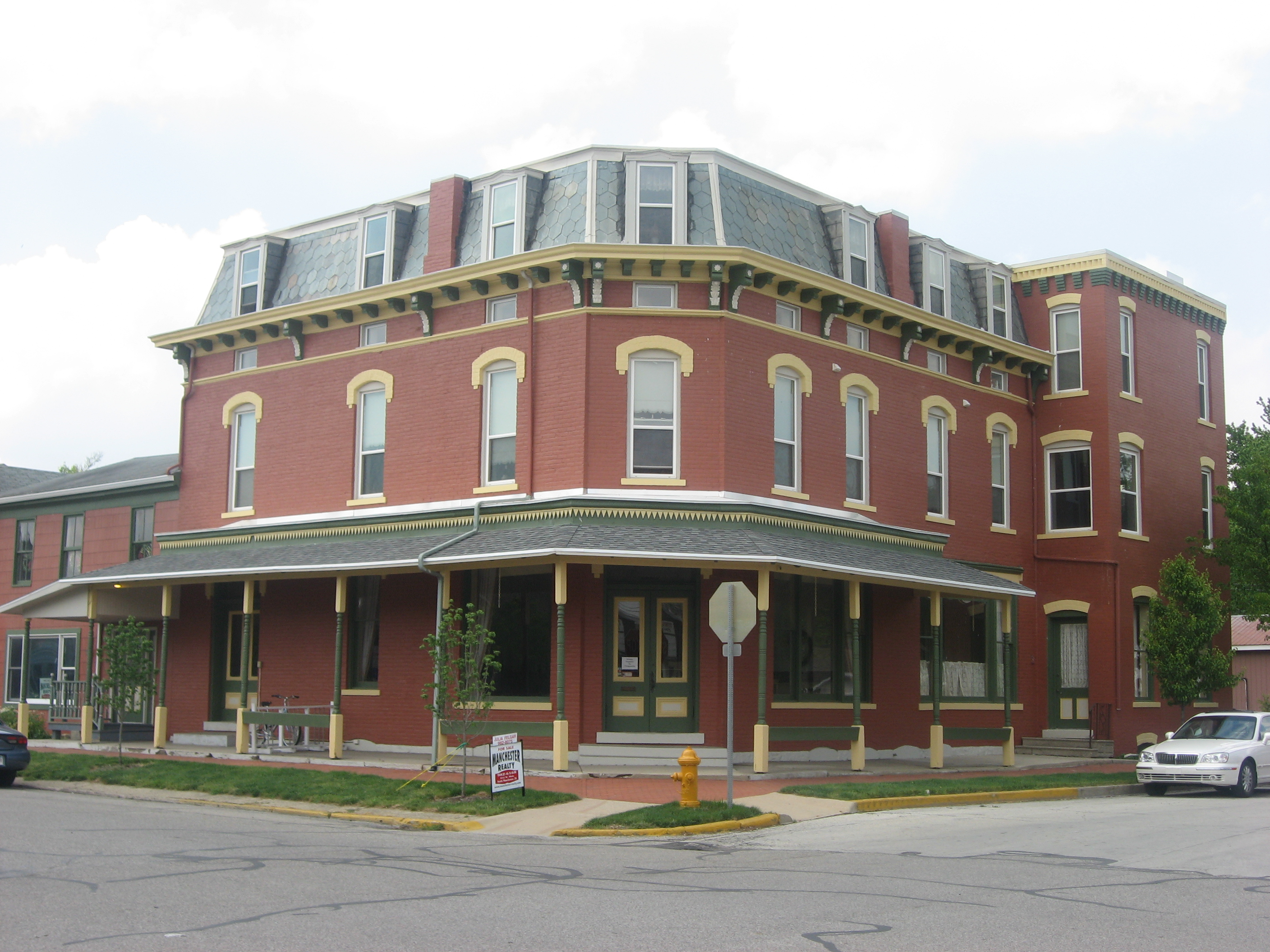
- Lentz House, Hotel Sheller, May 2012

- Location within Indiana Location within the United States
- Location: Walnut and 2nd Sts., North Manchester, Indiana
- Coordinates: 41°0′1″N 85°46′8″W
- Area: less than one acre
- Built: 1847, 1881, 1896
- Architectural style: Second Empire
- NRHP reference No.: 82000050
- Added to NRHP: November 14, 1982

Lentz House (Hotel Sheller) is a historic hotel located at North Manchester, Indiana, US. It was built in 1881 and is a 2 1/2-story, rectangular, Second Empire style brick building. The third story was added in 1896 and attached to the main building is a two-story frame wing built in 1847. It has a mansard roof with dormers and a wraparound porch.

It was listed on the National Register of Historic Places in 1982.
