= Noftzger-Adams House =

Historic house in Indiana, United States

- U.S. National Register of Historic Places
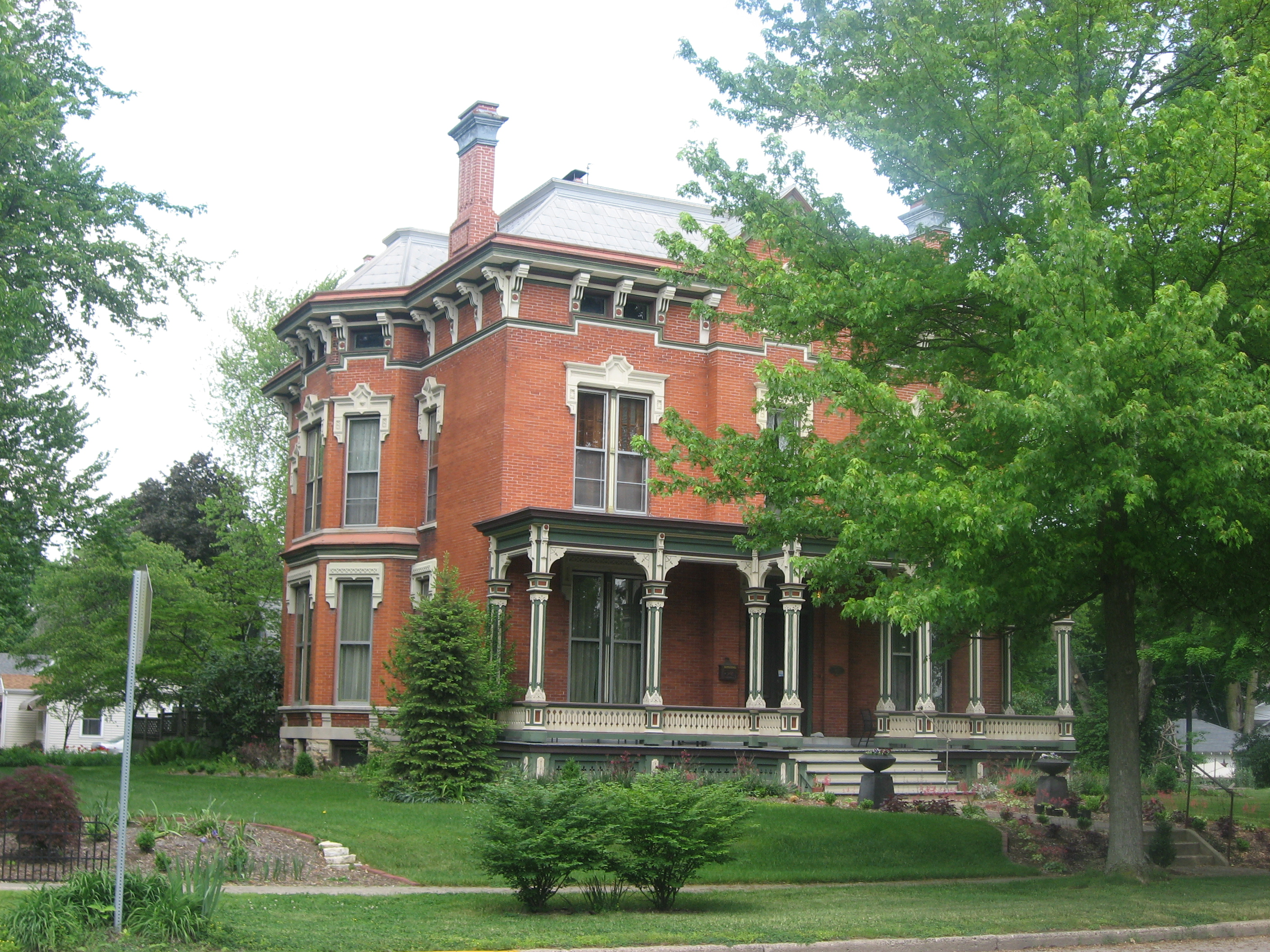
- Noftzger-Adams House, May 2012

- Location within Indiana Location within the United States
- Location: 102 E. 3rd St., North Manchester, Indiana
- Coordinates: 41°0′5″N 85°46′11″W
- Area: 0.6 acres (0.24 ha)
- Built: 1880
- Architectural style: Second Empire, Gothic
- NRHP reference No.: 79000024
- Added to NRHP: November 14, 1979

Noftzger-Adams House is a historic home located at North Manchester, Indiana. It was built in 1880, and is a two-story, brick dwelling with Second Empire and Gothic Revival style design elements. It sits on a stone block foundation and has a mansard roof with decorative brackets. It features a full-width front porch (reconstructed in 1978) and two-story bay.

It was listed on the National Register of Historic Places in 1979.
