= Lagro, Indiana =

- Town
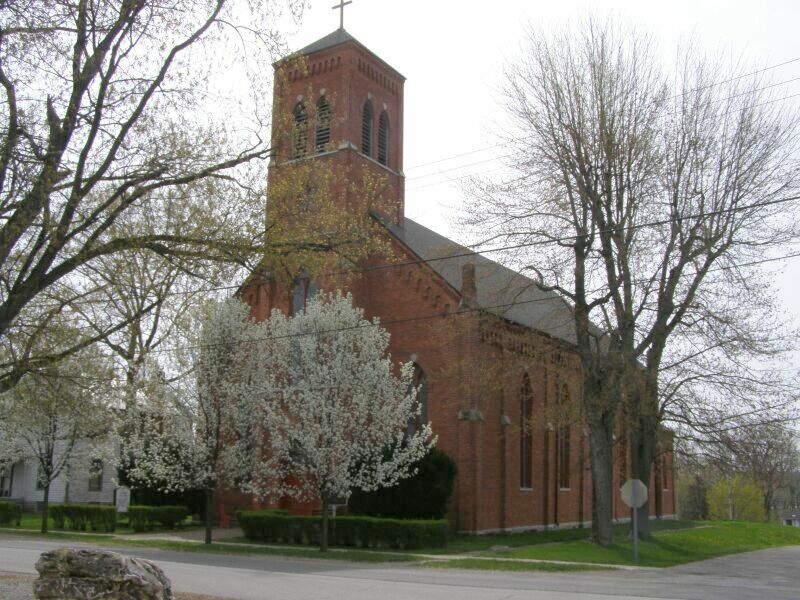
- St. Patrick's Catholic Church, founded in 1836 on the Wabash & Erie Canal

- Location of Lagro in Wabash County, Indiana.
- Coordinates: 40°50′21″N 85°43′39″W
- Country: United States
- State: Indiana
- County: Wabash
- Township: Lagro

Area
  - Total: 0.61 sq mi (1.57 km^{2})
  - Land: 0.59 sq mi (1.54 km^{2})
  - Water: 0.015 sq mi (0.04 km^{2})
- Elevation: 715 ft (218 m)

Population (2020)
  - Total: 349
  - Density: 588.3/sq mi (227.13/km^{2})
- Time zone: UTC-5 (EST)
  - Summer (DST): UTC-5 (EST)
- ZIP code: 46941
- Area code: 260
- FIPS code: 18-40896
- GNIS feature ID: 2396704
- Website: www.in.gov/towns/lagro/

Lagro is a town in Lagro Township, Wabash County, in the U.S. state of Indiana. The population was 349 at the 2020 census.

== History ==
The community was named after Le Gris, a Miami Chief. The Lagro post office has been in operation since 1893.

The National Register of Historic Places listed St. Patrick's Roman Catholic Church in 1999 and the Masonic Temple and the Red Men Hall in 2020.

Beginning in 1929, one of the main industries in Wabash County was rock wool production. As of 1937 at least five production facilities had been built in Wabash county, two of which were in or near Lagro.

In 1990, the Indiana Department of Environmental Management had designated the Celotex Corporation at 700-1400 W Main Street a potential hazardous waste site. In 2012, IDEM found the site to be contaminated with asbestos and other industrial waste to the extent that the land was not arable. Older solid waste disposal plot plans outline other potential landfills further west of 1400 W Main Street, now the site of a polyurethane manufacturing plant.

== Geography ==
Lagro is located along the Wabash River opposite the mouth of the Salamonie River, along the historic Wabash and Erie Canal trade route.

According to the 2010 census, Lagro has a total area of 0.6 square miles (1.55 km^{2}), of which 0.59 square miles (1.53 km^{2}) (or 98.33%) is land and 0.01 square miles (0.03 km^{2}) (or 1.67%) is water.

== Demographics ==
Historical population
| Census | Pop. | Note | %± |
|---|---|---|---|
| 1850 | 293 | | — |
| 1860 | 594 | | 102.7% |
| 1870 | 519 | | −12.6% |
| 1880 | 600 | | 15.6% |
| 1890 | 549 | | −8.5% |
| 1900 | 456 | | −16.9% |
| 1910 | 463 | | 1.5% |
| 1920 | 515 | | 11.2% |
| 1930 | 467 | | −9.3% |
| 1940 | 542 | | 16.1% |
| 1950 | 545 | | 0.6% |
| 1960 | 763 | | 40.0% |
| 1970 | 552 | | −27.7% |
| 1980 | 549 | | −0.5% |
| 1990 | 496 | | −9.7% |
| 2000 | 454 | | −8.5% |
| 2010 | 415 | | −8.6% |
| 2020 | 349 | | −15.9% |
U.S. Decennial Census

=== 2010 census ===
As of the census of 2010, there were 415 people, 156 households, and 110 families living in the town. The population density was 703.4 inhabitants per square mile (271.6/km^{2}). There were 184 housing units at an average density of 311.9 per square mile (120.4/km^{2}). The racial makeup of the town was 96.9% White, 1.7% Native American, 0.5% Asian, and 1.0% from two or more races.

There were 156 households, of which 35.9% had children under the age of 18 living with them, 45.5% were married couples living together, 10.9% had a female householder with no husband present, 14.1% had a male householder with no wife present, and 29.5% were non-families. 26.3% of all households were made up of individuals, and 16% had someone living alone who was 65 years of age or older. The average household size was 2.66 and the average family size was 3.11.

The median age in the town was 36.6 years. 26% of residents were under the age of 18; 11.6% were between the ages of 18 and 24; 24.8% were from 25 to 44; 26.2% were from 45 to 64; and 11.3% were 65 years of age or older. The gender makeup of the town was 54.2% male and 45.8% female.

=== 2000 census ===
As of the census of 2000, there were 454 people, 166 households, and 122 families living in the town. The population density was 758.7 inhabitants per square mile (292.9/km^{2}). There were 183 housing units at an average density of 305.8 per square mile (118.1/km^{2}). The racial makeup of the town was 98.90% White, 0.66% Native American, and 0.44% from two or more races. Hispanic or Latino of any race were 0.22% of the population.

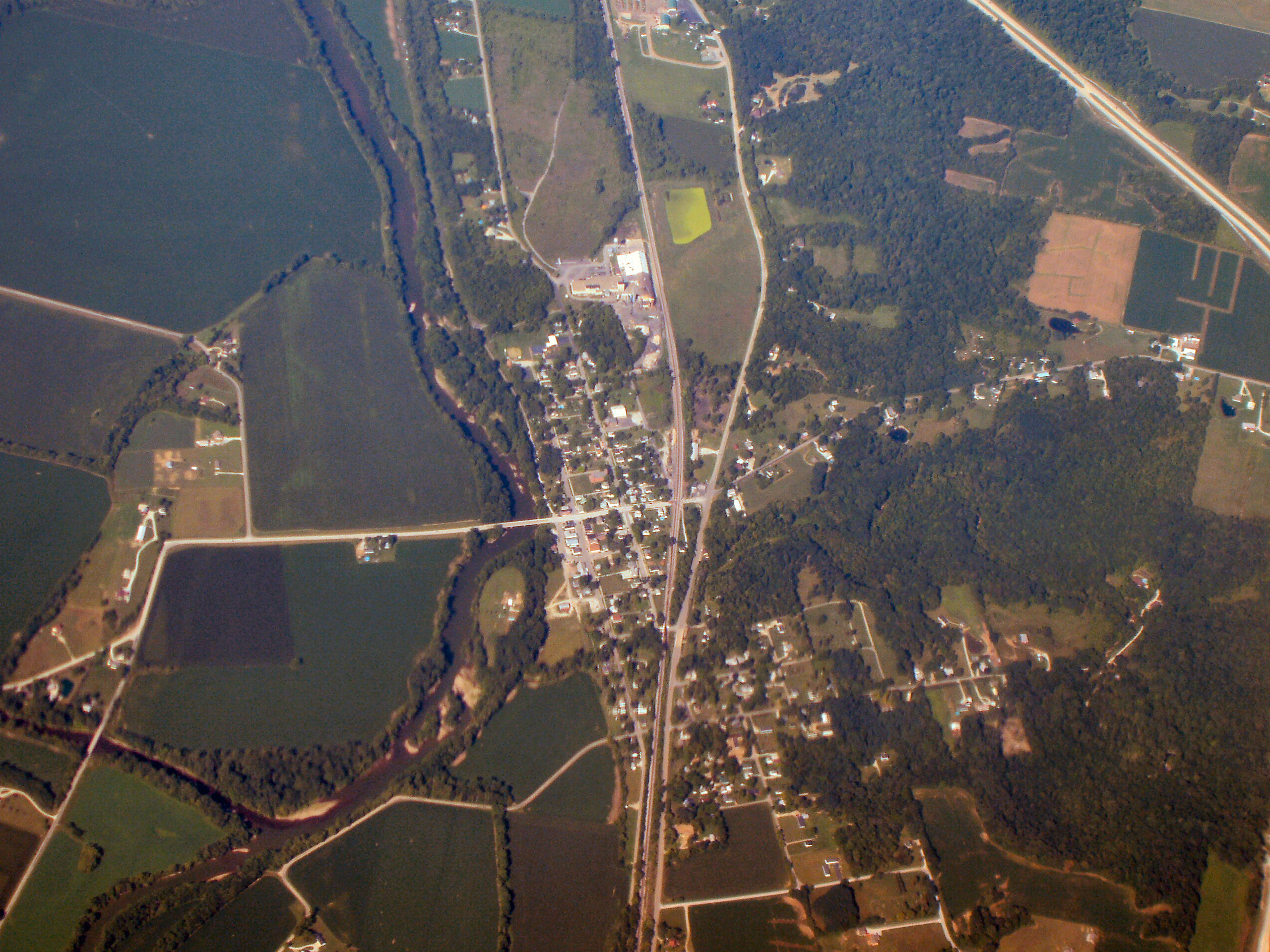
Lagro from the air.

There were 166 households, out of which 38.0% had children under the age of 18 living with them, 60.8% were married couples living together, 7.2% had a female householder with no husband present, and 26.5% were non-families. 23.5% of all households were made up of individuals, and 10.2% had someone living alone who was 65 years of age or older. The average household size was 2.73 and the average family size was 3.17.

In the town, the population was spread out, with 30.4% under the age of 18, 7.5% from 18 to 24, 31.3% from 25 to 44, 20.3% from 45 to 64, and 10.6% who were 65 years of age or older. The median age was 34 years. For every 100 females, there were 116.2 males. For every 100 females age 18 and over, there were 119.4 males.

The median income for a household in the town was $34,327, and the median income for a family was $39,375. Males had a median income of $37,188 versus $18,056 for females. The per capita income for the town was $13,186. About 3.9% of families and 6.5% of the population were below the poverty line, including 9.5% of those under age 18 and 4.2% of those age 65 or over.

== Notable people ==
- Ike Duffey (May 31, 1906 – April 4, 1967), sports executive
- Gene Stratton-Porter (August 17, 1863 – December 6, 1924), author, nature photographer, naturalist, and silent movie-era producer, was born at the Stratton family's farm near Lagro.

== See also ==
- Masonic Temple (Lagro, Indiana)
- Red Men Hall (Lagro, Indiana)
