= North Manchester, Indiana =

North Manchester
- Town
- Town of North Manchester
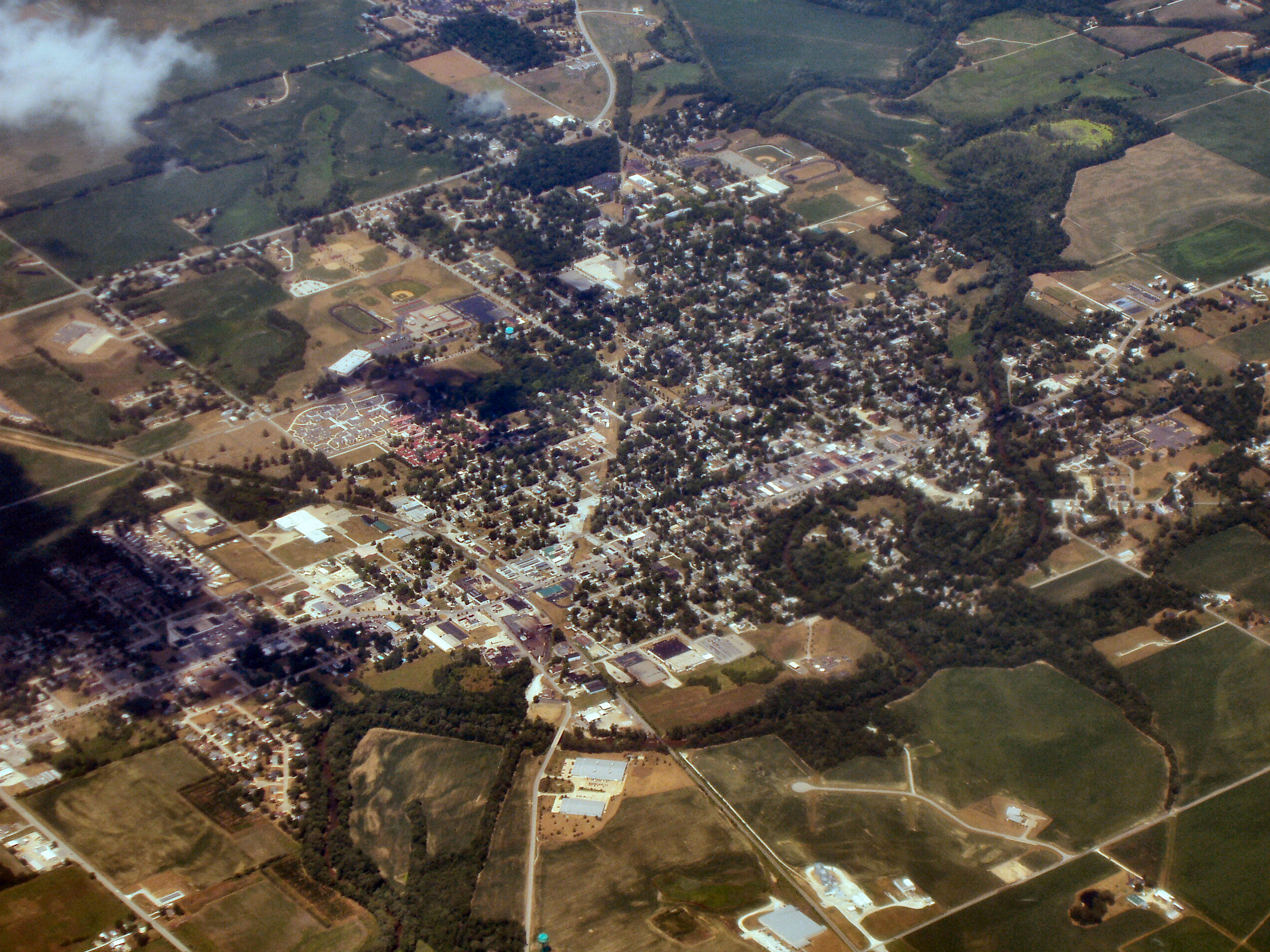
- North Manchester, Indiana from the air looking northeast

- Seal

- Location of North Manchester in Wabash County, Indiana.
- Coordinates: 41°0′04″N 85°46′34″W
- Country: United States
- State: Indiana
- County: Wabash
- Township: Chester
- Platted: February 13, 1846

Area
  - Total: 3.63 sq mi (9.39 km^{2})
  - Land: 3.54 sq mi (9.18 km^{2})
  - Water: 0.077 sq mi (0.20 km^{2})
- Elevation: 778 ft (237 m)

Population (2020)
  - Total: 5,277
  - Density: 1,488.3/sq mi (574.63/km^{2})
- Time zone: UTC-5 (EST)
  - Summer (DST): UTC-4 (EDT)
- ZIP code: 46962
- Area code: 260
- FIPS code: 18-54954
- GNIS feature ID: 2396822
- Website: northmanchester.in.gov

North Manchester is a town in Chester Township, Wabash County, in the U.S. state of Indiana. The population was 5,273 at the 2020 census.

== History ==
Peter Ogan, acting as the town's founder filed for recording the 'Original Plat of Manchester' on February 13, 1846. The community was named after Manchester, in England.

The North Manchester post office has been in operation since 1838.

In the early 20th century, automobiles were made here by the DeWitt Motor Company. On February 1, 1968, Martin Luther King Jr. gave a speech at Manchester College. This was the last time he spoke at a college campus, as he was assassinated eight weeks later. Robert F. Kennedy also visited Manchester College during his 1968 presidential campaign – he, too, would be assassinated a few weeks later. Other international visitors during that same decade include Duke Ellington, Buckminster Fuller, Ralph Nader, and Ramsey Lewis (whose concert was cut short by a bomb scare).

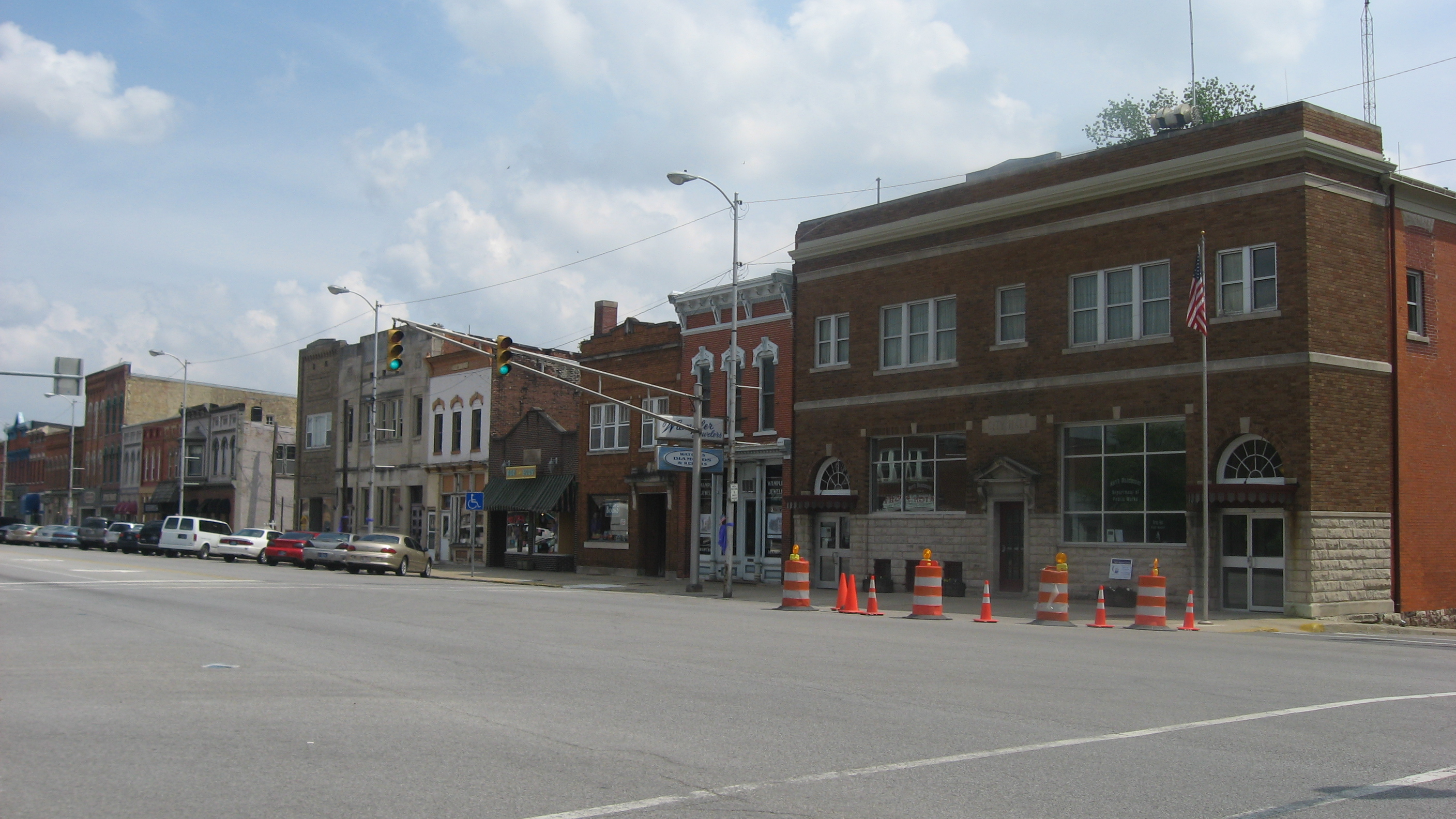
The commercial district is one of eight sites in North Manchester listed on the National Register of Historic Places

Thomas R. Marshall, who served as Governor of Indiana and as Vice President of the United States under President Woodrow Wilson, was born in North Manchester.

The Lentz House (Hotel Sheller), Manchester College Historic District, Thomas R. Marshall School, Noftzger-Adams House, North Manchester Covered Bridge, North Manchester Historic District, North Manchester Public Library, and Peabody Memorial Tower are listed on the National Register of Historic Places. The North Manchester Planing and Band Saw Mill was formerly listed.

== Geography ==
According to the 2010 census, North Manchester has a total area of 3.61 square miles (9.35 km^{2}), of which 3.53 square miles (9.14 km^{2}) (or 97.78%) is land and 0.08 square miles (0.21 km^{2}) (or 2.22%) is water.

== Demographics ==
Historical population
Census	Pop.	Note	%±
1880	1,585		—
1890	2,384		50.4%
1900	2,398		0.6%
1910	2,428		1.3%
1920	2,711		11.7%
1930	2,765		2.0%
1940	3,170		14.6%
1950	3,977		25.5%
1960	4,377		10.1%
1970	5,791		32.3%
1980	5,998		3.6%
1990	6,383		6.4%
2000	6,260		−1.9%
2010	6,112		−2.4%
2020	5,277		−13.7%
U.S. Decennial Census

=== 2020 census ===
As of the 2020 census, North Manchester had a population of 5,277. The median age was 44.2 years. 19.5% of residents were under the age of 18 and 28.1% of residents were 65 years of age or older. For every 100 females there were 84.4 males, and for every 100 females age 18 and over there were 81.0 males age 18 and over.

98.3% of residents lived in urban areas, while 1.7% lived in rural areas.

There were 2,164 households in North Manchester, of which 24.0% had children under the age of 18 living in them. Of all households, 42.5% were married-couple households, 18.8% were households with a male householder and no spouse or partner present, and 32.0% were households with a female householder and no spouse or partner present. About 37.5% of all households were made up of individuals and 20.8% had someone living alone who was 65 years of age or older.

There were 2,422 housing units, of which 10.7% were vacant. The homeowner vacancy rate was 2.6% and the rental vacancy rate was 13.7%.

Racial composition as of the 2020 census
Race	Number	Percent
White	4,810	91.2%
Black or African American	37	0.7%
American Indian and Alaska Native	14	0.3%
Asian	47	0.9%
Native Hawaiian and Other Pacific Islander	2	0.0%
Some other race	138	2.6%
Two or more races	229	4.3%
Hispanic or Latino (of any race)	293	5.6%

=== 2010 census ===
As of the census of 2010, there were 6,112 people, 2,213 households, and 1,302 families living in the town. The population density was 1,731.4 inhabitants per square mile (668.5/km^{2}). There were 2,484 housing units at an average density of 703.7 units per square mile (271.7 units/km^{2}). The racial makeup of the town was 95.2% White, 1.1% African American, 0.3% Native American, 0.8% Asian, 1.2% from other races, and 1.3% from two or more races. Hispanic or Latino of any race were 3.8% of the population.

There were 2,213 households, of which 25.8% had children under the age of 18 living with them, 45.1% were married couples living together, 10.2% had a female householder with no husband present, 3.5% had a male householder with no wife present, and 41.2% were non-families. 34.7% of all households were made up of individuals, and 18.5% had someone living alone who was 65 years of age or older. The average household size was 2.25 and the average family size was 2.87.

The median age in the town was 36.5 years. 18.1% of residents were under the age of 18; 22.2% were between the ages of 18 and 24; 16.8% were from 25 to 44; 20.9% were from 45 to 64; and 22.1% were 65 years of age or older. The gender makeup of the town was 45.8% male and 54.2% female.

=== 2000 census ===
As of the census of 2000, there were 6,260 people, 2,192 households, and 1,374 families living in the town. The population density was 1,735.5 inhabitants per square mile (670.1/km^{2}). There were 2,327 housing units at an average density of 645.1 units per square mile (249.1 units/km^{2}). The racial makeup of the town was 96.15% White, 0.93% African American, 0.27% Native American, 0.83% Asian, 0.06% Pacific Islander, 0.80% from other races, and 0.96% from two or more races. Hispanic or Latino of any race were 1.74% of the population.

There were 2,192 households, out of which 26.0% had children under the age of 18 living with them, 51.0% were married couples living together, 8.9% had a female householder with no husband present, and 37.3% were non-families. 31.3% of all households were made up of individuals, and 13.9% had someone living alone who was 65 years of age or older. The average household size was 2.29 and the average family size was 2.85.

In the town, the population was spread out, with 17.8% under the age of 18, 21.9% from 18 to 24, 20.1% from 25 to 44, 17.9% from 45 to 64, and 22.3% who were 65 years of age or older. The median age was 36 years. For every 100 females, there were 81.4 males. For every 100 females age 18 and over, there were 78.2 males.

The median income for a household in the town was $35,448, and the median income for a family was $46,781. Males had a median income of $31,795 versus $23,388 for females. The per capita income for the town was $17,140. About 4.8% of families and 8.7% of the population were below the poverty line, including 6.9% of those under age 18 and 5.0% of those age 65 or over.

== Education ==
North Manchester is home to Manchester University and Manchester Junior-Senior High School.

The town has a lending library, the North Manchester Public Library.

== Notable people ==
- Andrew W. Cordier (1901–1975), history professor (1923–1944), co-founder of the United Nations (1945), President of Columbia University (1968–1970)
- Lloyd C. Douglas (1877–1951), author and pastor of the Lutheran Church
- Daniel Garber (1880–1958), American Impressionist landscape painter, born in North Manchester
- Michael Leckrone (b.1936), director of the University of Wisconsin Marching Band
- Clyde Lovellette (1929–2016), Hall of Fame basketball player
- Thomas R. Marshall (1854–1925), Governor of Indiana (1909–1913) and Vice President of the United States (1913–1921), born in North Manchester
- Francis W. Palmer (1827–1907), Printer, Member of Congress, born in North Manchester
- Grace Van Studdiford (1873–1927), stage actress and opera singer
