= North Manchester Public Library =

- Old North Manchester Public Library
- U.S. National Register of Historic Places
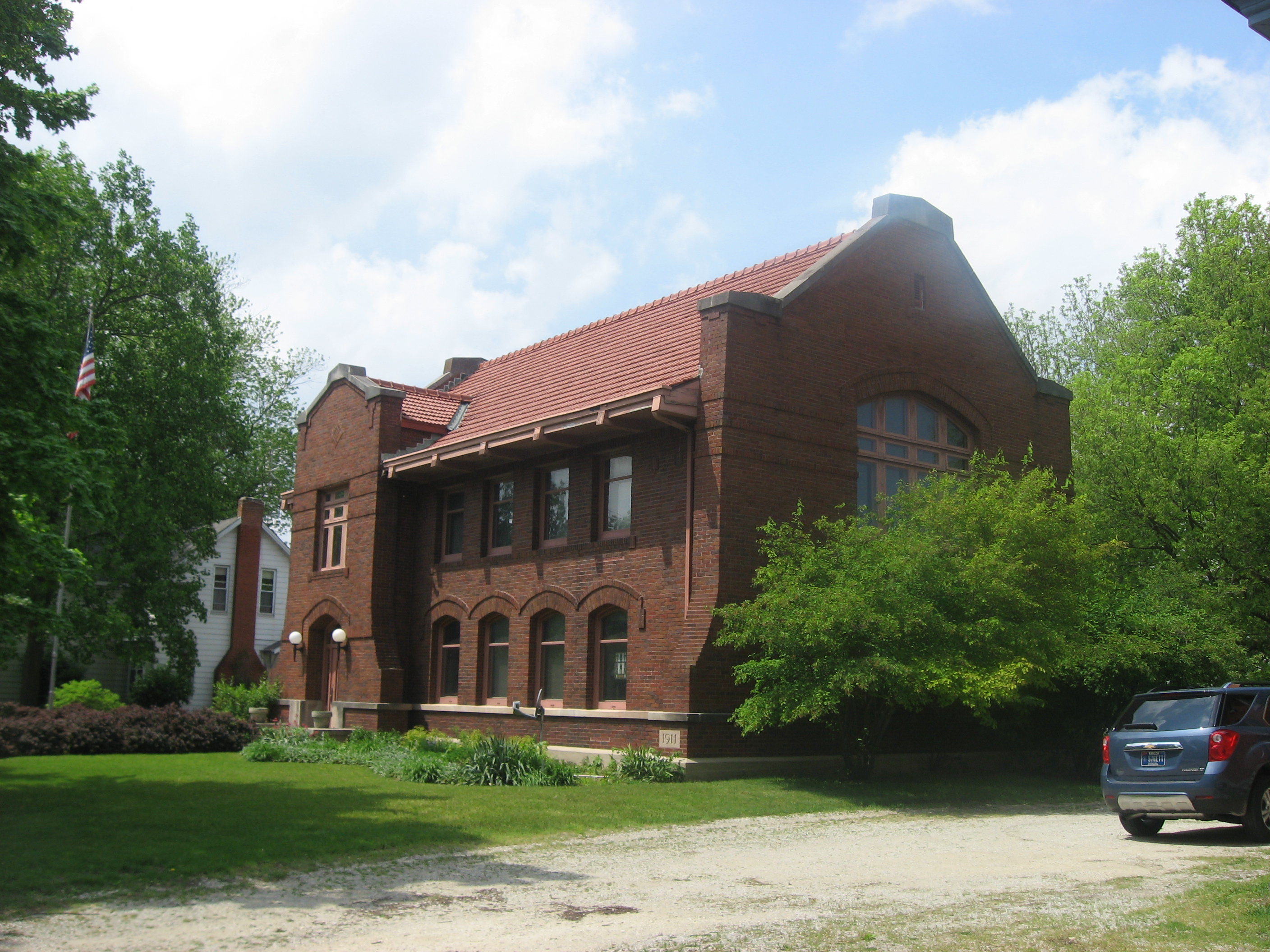
- North Manchester Public Library, May 2012

- Location within Indiana Location within the United States
- Location: 204 W. Main St., North Manchester, Indiana
- Coordinates: 40°59′58″N 85°46′20″W
- Area: less than one acre
- Built: 1912
- Architect: Miller, Grant C.
- Architectural style: Bungalow/craftsman
- NRHP reference No.: 96000290
- Added to NRHP: March 14, 1996

Old North Manchester Public Library is a historic Carnegie library building located at North Manchester, Indiana. It was built in 1912, and is a two-story, rectangular, American Craftsman style dark red brick building over a basement. It has a low-pitched side gable roof of red Spanish tile and wide overhanging eaves. The building corners feature massive piers with sloping sides. It was built in part with a $10,000 donation from the Carnegie Foundation.

It was listed on the National Register of Historic Places in 1996. The building no longer contains a public library; since the 1990s, it is owned by a private law firm. The "new" North Manchester Public Library is located at 405 North Market Street.
