= Manchester College Historic District =

Historic district in Indiana, United States

- Formerly listed on the U.S. National Register of Historic Places
- U.S. Historic district
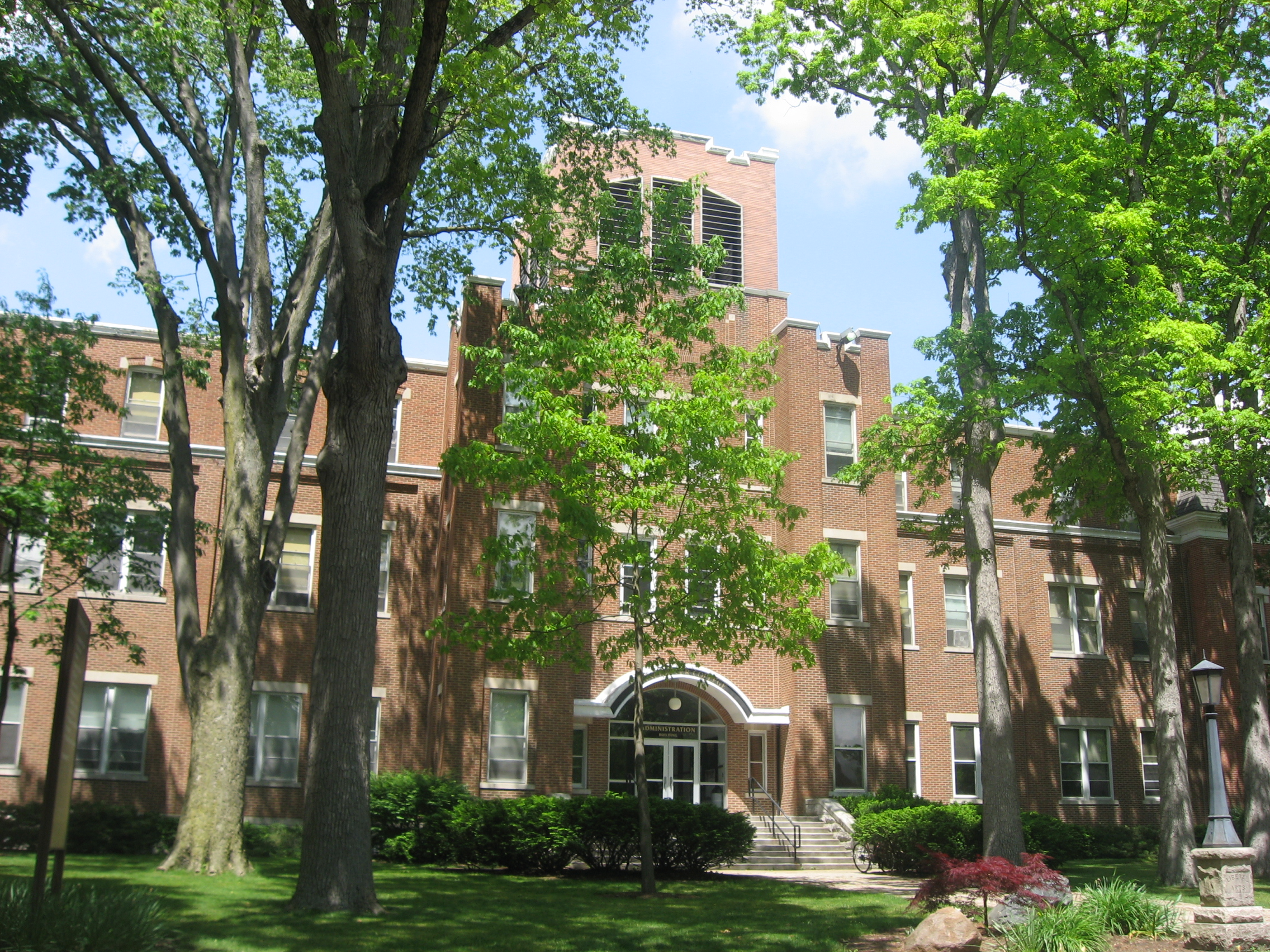
- Manchester College Administration Building, May 2012

- Location within Indiana Location within the United States
- Location: 604 College Ave., North Manchester, Indiana
- Coordinates: 41°0′38″N 85°45′45″W
- Area: 2 acres (0.81 ha)
- Built: 1889
- Architectural style: Classical Revival, Second Empire, Tudor Revival, Bungalow/Craftsman
- NRHP reference No.: 90001929

Significant dates
- Added to NRHP: December 27, 1990
- Removed from NRHP: May 22, 2023

Manchester College Historic District was a national historic district located at North Manchester, Indiana. It encompassed three contributing buildings and one contributing object on the campus of Manchester University. They are the Administration Building, Ikenberry Hall, and Oakwood Hall. The Administration Building consists of the 2 1/2-story, Second Empire style Baumgerdner Hall (1889); 2 1/2-story, Second Empire style, Bible School (1895); with the Tudor Revival style connecting the two older buildings (1920–1921). The Administration Building consisted of a four-story central tower with three-story flanking wings. Oakwood Hall, originally the Women's Dormitory, was built in 1898 with an addition built in 1916 and a Bungalow / American Craftsman style addition in 1926. Ikenberry Hall, originally the Men's Dormitory, was built in 1906, and was a 3 1/2-story, Classical Revival style orange brick building. The district also included the two-tier, cast iron college fountain (1924).

It was listed on the National Register of Historic Places in 1990, and was delisted in 2023.
