= Bulstrode (surname) =

Bulstrode is a surname, and may refer to:

- Beatrix Bulstrode (1896–1951), English journalist and travel writer
- Cecily Bulstrode (1584–1609), English courtier
- Dorothy Bulstrode (1592–1650), English courtier
- Edward Bulstrode (1588–1659), judge and writer
- Francis Bulstrode (by 1515–1568 or later), English politician
- Henry Bulstrode (1578–1643), English politician
- Richard Bulstrode (1610–1711), English author, diplomat and soldier, son of Edward Bulstrode (1588–1659)
- Whitelocke Bulstrode (1650–1724), English official, religious controversialist and mystical writer
