= James Whitelocke =

English judge and politician (1570–1632)

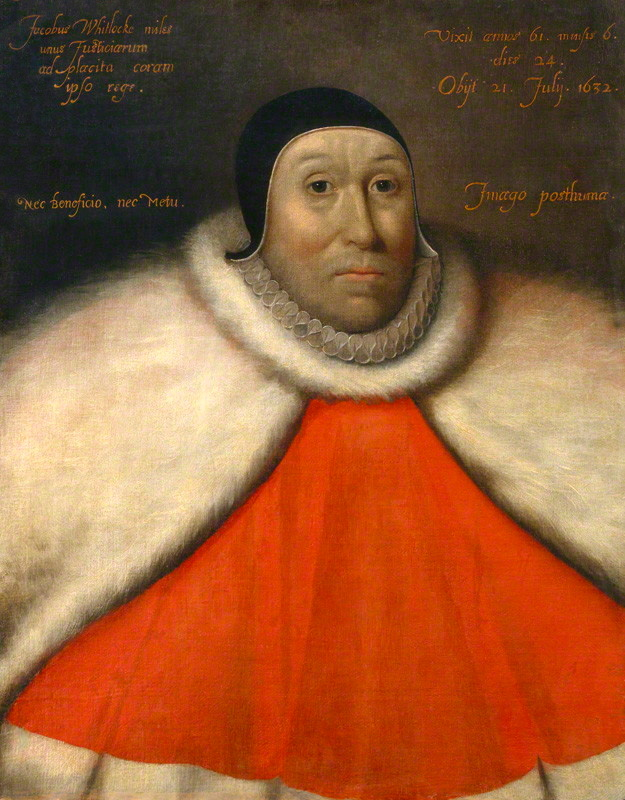
Sir James Whitelocke

Sir James Whitelocke SL (28 November 1570 – 22 June 1632) was an English judge and politician who sat in the House of Commons between 1610 and 1622.

== Early life ==
Whitelocke was the younger of posthumous twin sons of Richard Whitelocke, a London merchant, by Joan Brockhurst, widow, daughter of John Colte of Little Munden, Hertfordshire. He was educated from 1575 at Merchant Taylors' School, and on 11 June 1588, he was elected probationer at St. John's College, Oxford. He matriculated on 12 July 1588, and was elected fellow of his college in November 1589. His tutors were Rowland Searchfield, in classics and logic, and Alberico Gentile in the civil law. He also studied Hebrew and other Semitic languages. He graduated bachelor in civil law on 1 July 1594. Among the contemporaries at Oxford with whom he formed lasting friendships were William Laud, Humphrey May, and Ralph Winwood. In London he moved in the circle of Sir Robert Bruce Cotton, and about in 1600 he joined the Society of Antiquaries. He pursued his professional studies first at New Inn, afterwards at the Middle Temple, where he was admitted on 2 March 1593, called to the bar in August 1600, elected bencher in Hilary term 1618–19, and reader in the following August.

== Under James I ==
Whitelocke was appointed steward of the St. John's College estates in 1601. He became recorder of Woodstock on 1 August 1606, steward of and counsel for Eton College on 6 December 1609, and joint steward of the Westminster College estates on 7 May 1610.

In 1610 Whitelocke was elected in a by-election as Member of Parliament for Woodstock. He took part in the debates on impositions in 1610. He also acted as the mouthpiece of the Commons on the presentation (24 May) of the remonstrance against the royal inhibition which terminated the discussion. The subsequent proceedings drew from him (2 July) a defence of the rights of the subject and delimitation of the royal prerogative which was long attributed to Henry Yelverton.

In 1613 Whitelocke's opposition to the prerogative brought him into sharp collision with the crown. The administration of the navy stood in urgent need of reform, and in the winter of 1612–13 a preliminary step was taken by the issue of a commission investing the lord high admiral (Charles Howard, 1st Earl of Nottingham), Lord Chancellor Ellesmere, the lord privy seal and lord chamberlain with extraordinary powers for the investigation of abuses and the trial of offenders. As legal adviser to Sir Robert Mansell, who was interested in defeating the investigation, Whitelocke drew up a series of 'exceptions' to the commission, in which he very strictly circumscribed the prerogative. A copy of the exceptions came into the hands of the crown lawyers, who at once suspected that they were Whitelocke's. Evidence was wanting; but his contemporaneous opposition to the transfer of a cause in which he was retained from the chancery to the court of the Earl Marshal furnished a pretext for his committal to Fleet Prison (18 May); and he was not released until he had made full submission in writing (13 June).

In 1614 Whitelocke was re-elected MP for Woodstock in the Addled Parliament. He was nominated with Sir Thomas Crew and others to represent the Commons in the projected conference with the Lords. Because of the sudden dissolution on 7 June the conference never met and on the following day Whitelocke and his colleagues were summoned to the council chamber, and told to destroy the notes of their intended speeches. In disfavour at court, Whitelocke was compelled to surrender (18 November 1616) the reversion of the king's bench enrolments' office which he held jointly with Robert Heath, by whom he was also defeated in the contest for the recordership of London in November 1618.

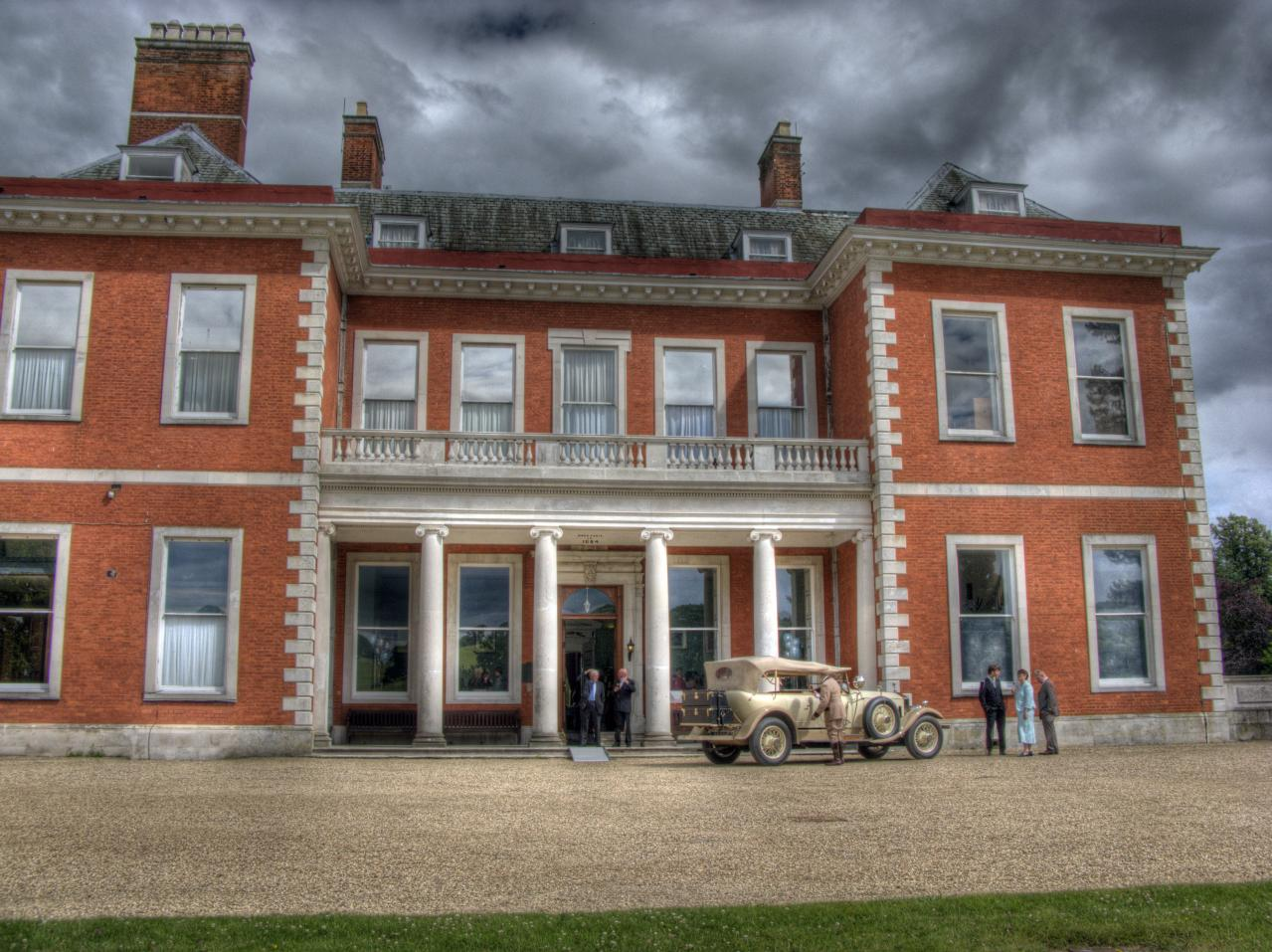
Fawley Court, Buckinghamshire

Meanwhile, however, his professional reputation and gains increased. In 1616 he purchased the estate of Fawley Court, Buckinghamshire. He was placed on the commission of the peace for Buckinghamshire on 27 November 1617, and for Oxfordshire on 7 May 1618. On 12 January 1619 he was appointed deputy custos rotulorum for the liberties of Westminster and St. Martin's-le-Grand.

Whitelocke stood, on the whole, well with Francis Bacon, to whom he owed his investiture as serjeant-at-law on 29 June 1620 and subsequent advancement on 29 October. He was given in 1620 the then important position of chief justice of the court of session of the County Palatine of Chester and the great sessions of the counties of Montgomery, Denbigh, and Flint. He was knighted on 4 October 1620. Shortly afterwards he was elected recorder by each of the four boroughs of Bewdley in Worcestershire, Ludlow and Bishop's Castle in Shropshire, and Poole, Cheshire. Differences with the president of the council in the Welsh marches (the Earl of Northampton) led to Whitelocke's transfer from the Chester court to the king's bench, where he was sworn in as justice on 18 October 1624. He had also a commission to hear causes in chancery, and sat once in the star-chamber. He was re-elected MP for Woodstock in 1621.

== Under Charles I ==
He was continued in office by Charles I, and in the following autumn it fell to him, as junior judge in his court, to discharge the hazardous duty of adjourning term during the plague outbreak of 1625. To escape from the contagion he drove, halting only at Hyde Park Corner to dine, in his coach from Horton, near Colnbrook, Buckinghamshire, to Westminster Hall, and, after hurrying through the necessary forms, re-entered his coach and drove back to Horton.

In November 1626 Whitelocke concurred with Sir Ranulph Crew in declining to certify the legality of forced loans. In Darnell's Case, however, he supported the Crown. The remand was not allowed to pass without the citation of the judges to the House of Lords to answer for their conduct. They obeyed, and through Whitelocke's mouth glossed their order by representing it as only intended to allow time for further consideration.

In February 1629 the House of Commons enquired into the release of the supposed Jesuits recently discovered in Clerkenwell. Whitelocke, as one of the judges who had examined them, was cited to justify the release, which he did on the ground that there was no evidence that the prisoners were in priest's orders. The stormy scenes which preceded the dissolution of this parliament (10 March) and the subsequent committal of Sir John Eliot and his friends to the Tower of London brought the judges once more into delicate relations both with the Crown and Parliament. The evasion by the three common-law chiefs of the issues submitted to them by the king (Whitelocke, Heath and John Walter) was followed by the reference of substantially the same questions to the entire common-law bench (25 April). The points of law were again evaded, but eleven out of the twelve judges sanctioned proceedings in the star-chamber; of the eleven, Whitelocke was one. He also concurred in the course taken after the argument upon the writs of habeas corpus, the application by letter to the king for directions, and the remand of the prisoners pending his answer (June). At a private audience with the king at Hampton Court on Michaelmas day he obtained consent to the release of the prisoners on security given for their good behaviour, a concession which they unanimously rejected. On the trial Whitelocke concurred in the judgment.

Whitelocke was greatly interested in antiquarian studies, and was the author of several papers which are printed in Thomas Hearne's Collection of Discourses (1771); his journal, or Liber famelicus, was edited by John Bruce and published by the Camden Society in 1858.

Whitelocke died at Fawley Court on 22 June 1632. His remains were interred in Fawley churchyard, with a marble monument. His estates were later exempted by the Long Parliament from liability to contribute to the fund for making reparation to Eliot and his fellow-sufferers.

== Family ==
In 1602 Whitelocke married Elizabeth Bulstrode (1575-1631), a daughter of Edward Bulstrode of Hedgerley Bulstrode, Buckinghamshire. Two of her sisters, Dorothy and Cecily Bulstrode were gentlewomen in the bedchamber of Anne of Denmark Dorothy married Sir John Eyre in 1611 without her family's consent, Eyre was a "vicious reprobate" according to Whitelocke. Another sister Anne Bulstrode (died 1611) married the lawyer John Searl in 1609.

Whitelocke's eldest son was the parliamentarian Sir Bulstrode Whitelocke (born 1605). His son James was born in 1612. His daughter Elizabeth, born in 1603, married Thomas Mostyn in 1623, the others were; Mary (1606-1611); Cecilia born in March 1607; Joan in 1609 and died in 1610; Dorothy born and died in 1610.

Whitelocke's twin brother, William, served under Francis Drake, and fell at sea in an engagement with the Spaniards. Of two other brothers, the elder, Edmund, was a courtier who was implicated in the Gunpowder Plot.

== Notes ==
Parliament of England
Preceded by Sir Richard Lee; Thomas Spencer	Member of Parliament for Woodstock; 1610–1622; With: Thomas Spencer 1610–1611; Sir Philip Cary 1614–1622	Succeeded by Sir Philip Cary; William Lenthall
Legal offices
Preceded by Sir Thomas Chamberlayne	Chief Justice of Chester; 1620–1624	Succeeded by Sir Thomas Chamberlayne
