= Inventory of Elizabeth I =

Elizabeth I's belongings Recorded inventories, (1574)

The Inventory of Elizabeth I recorded the costume and gold and silver plate belonging to Elizabeth I in several inventories, and other documents, including rolls of New Year's Day gifts. Arthur Jefferies Collins published the Jewels and Plate of Queen Elizabeth I: The Inventory of 1574 from manuscripts in 1955. The published inventory describes jewels and silver-plate belonging to Elizabeth with detailed references to other source material. Two inventories of Elizabeth's costume and some of her jewellery were published by Janet Arnold in Queen Elizabeth's Wardrobe Unlock'd (Maney, 1988).

== Introduction ==
In 1574 the office of the Jewel House was located in a two-storey building on the south side of the White Tower. This contained the records of the jewels and packing materials for sending jewels to court. The 1574 inventory was made by John Astley, Master and Treasurer of the Jewel House. The Master had an annual salary of £50 and was able to exact payments from goldsmiths appointed to work for the Jewel House, and those who transported plate from the House to diplomats. The post was lucrative, but some of the perquisites of the role were exaggerated or overstated by Sir Gilbert Talbot, who was made Master in 1660 and in 1680 wrote a treatise entitled Of the Jewel house. In the inventory the items were listed in categories; below an outline of the main categories is given with some examples of the 1,605 entries.

The sources used by Collins were British Library Harley MS 1560 and Stowe MS 555 (see external links for digitised manuscripts). The manuscripts represent the "Quenis Majesties juelles plate and other stuff" in 1574 and additions by gift or purchase over the next 20 years which were kept in the Jewel House at the Tower of London. Collins also collated information from other books and manuscripts to cross-reference information about the objects listed. Gifts of plate to the queen passed from the Privy Chamber to the Jewel House. Some pieces were melted down and others were given as diplomatic gifts. When the queen travelled, the towns she visited often gave her gifts of silver-gilt cups.

Collins identified five pieces of silver gilt plate which included a phoenix in the design. Although the phoenix was adopted as one of the emblems of Elizabeth and represented her reign and celibacy, he argues that these were older pieces which had belonged to Edward Seymour, 1st Duke of Somerset. His heraldic badges included the phoenix. The phoenix device was also used by Jane Seymour.

=== Costume inventories ===
Janet Arnold published an annotated wardrobe inventory now in the British Library, (Stowe MS 557), consulting also a duplicate copy at the National Archives, and another inventory held by the Folger Shakespeare Library, MS V. b.72. The inventory includes some of the queen's jewels.

Janet Arnold also published a surviving wardrobe book which records gifts, fabrics issued to the gentlewomen who made Elizabeth's hoods, and losses of jewelled buttons and aglets from her clothes. Entries were signed by the gentlewomen and chamberers and can be very detailed: Elizabeth lost a pendant pearl from one of three fish that comprised a jewel called the "monster while visiting Wanstead Park on 25 February 1584.

== Outline of the 1574 inventory of plate ==
=== Gold plate ===
- Juelles of Golde
  - no. 1 The imperial crown of England.
  - no. 2 The sceptre of gold with a dove.
  - no. 3 The globe or round ball (orb) with a cross.
  - no. 4 The queen's crown (intended for a queen consort).
  - no. 5 The queen's sceptre with a dove intended for a queen consort). One sceptre was repaired by Cornelis Hayes for the coronation of Anne Boleyn, and later issued to Dorothy Bulstrode for a masque of Anne of Denmark, and a gold wing was lost.
  - no. 6 A pair of bracelets with six rubies and seven large pearls and five smaller pearls, with red laces.
- Cups and bowls

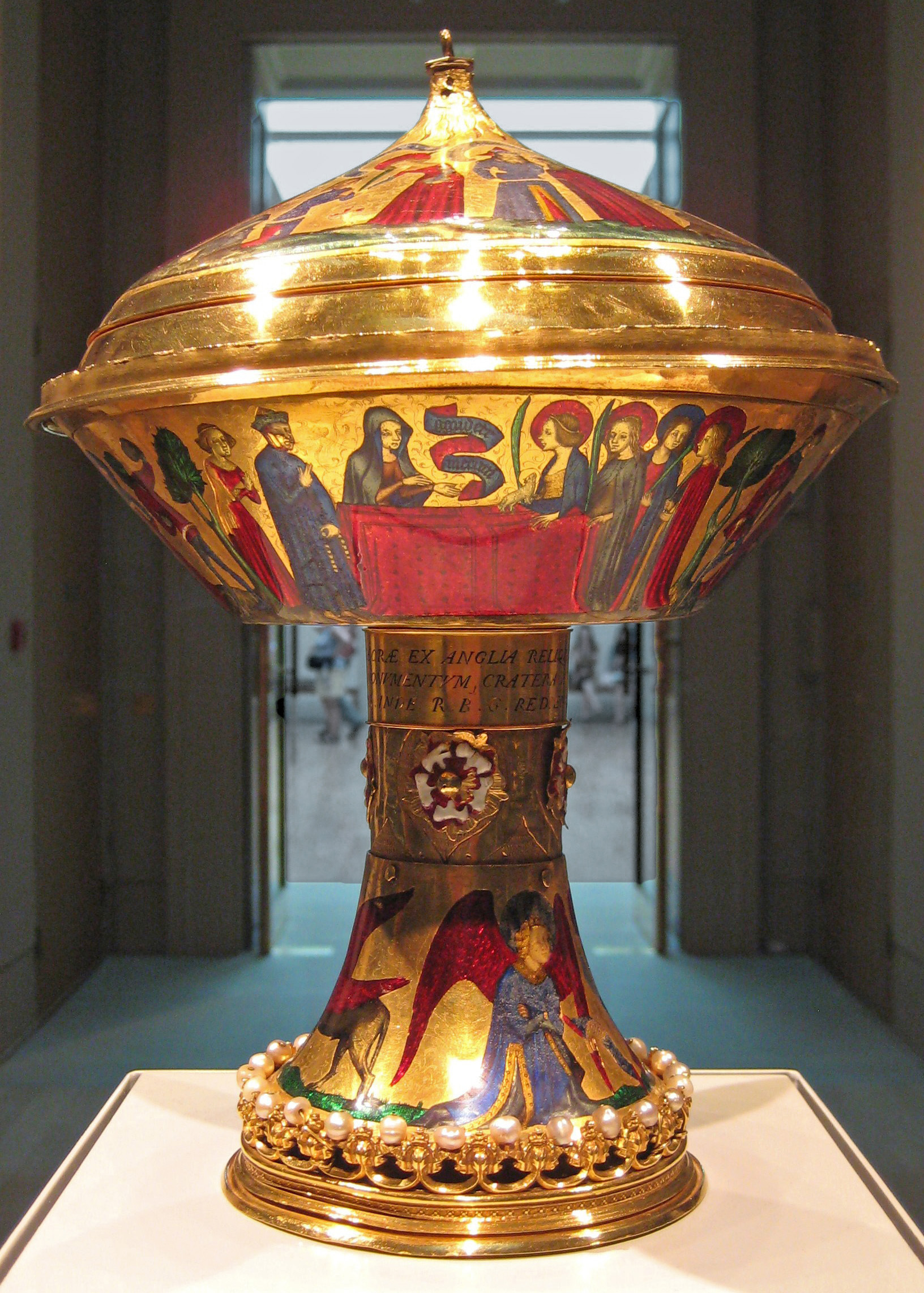
The Royal Gold Cup is 23.6 cm (9.3 in) high and 17.8 cm (7.0 in) across at its widest point. It weighs 1.935 kg (4.27 lb) of solid gold, enamels and jewels, showing scenes from the life of Saint Agnes. Now in the British Museum, it was item no. 48 in the 1574 inventory, and later given away by James I.

  - no. 48 The St Agnes cup. A cup of gold with imagery the knop a crown imperial and about border of the cover and the foot a crown garnished with 61 pearls.
  - no. 49 A jewelled gold cup given to James VI of Scotland at the christening of Prince Henry at Stirling Castle on 30 August 1594.
  - no. 75 A cup of "assaye" of gold fair wrought and enamelled. Given to Christian IV of Denmark on 5 August 1606.
- Candlesticks
  - no. 77: Four gold candlesticks for a table with "H" and "R" enamelled in red. Three were gifts to Henry VIII from Catherine of Aragon.
- Goblets and jugs
- Salt cellars
  - no. 83 A salt called the "Morris Dance" decorated with precious stones and pearls with 5 morris dancers, a drummer, and a lady. The salt was taken to The Hague in October 1625 by the Duke of Buckingham and pawned.
- Orange-strainers
- Trenchers
- Spoons and forks
- Basins, ewers and lairs
  - no. 124, a "laire" which comprised a gold mounted nautilus shell with a handle formed of an "antique man" and a spout set with diamonds. Buckingham's secretary Sackville recorded that this "laire" was pawned to Samuel and David Godyn in The Hague after 26 October 1625, and was subsequently sold in 1629 to William Scarborow for £2390.
  - no. 125 A gold basin with the arms of Jane Seymour with gold roses enamelled red and white, and the border of the cover engraved with roses, a bird with a ring in its mouth, and a worm or serpent. Presented to the Constable of Castile in 1604.
- Glasses
- Casting-bottles
  - no. 148 A casting bottle with the queen's arms. Dorothy Silking, a chamberer of Anne of Denmark was accused of taking this bottle.

=== Silver, silver-gilt, and parcel-gilt plate ===
- Crosses
- Book-covers
  - nos. 152 and 153 The covering of a Bible of silver and gilt fair wrought, and the covering of a Book of Common Prayer. These book covers were later weighed by the auditor Francis Gofton.
- A baptismal font
  - no. 159 The silver-gilt font was decorated with pomegranates (the emblem of Catherine of Aragon), roses, and "antique" (renaissance style) decoration. It was made for Mary I of England in 1555.
- Church plate
- Mitres
- Cups and cups of assay
  - no. 215 An "Antique" (renaissance style) gilt cup with a cover with a letter "D". Given in 1604 to Jean Grusset Richardot, President of the Privy Council of the Netherlands.
  - no. 225 Two great gilt cups with German knights in armour on their covers with shields and halberds. These had belonged to the Duke of Northumberland. With other pieces, they were given to Alessandro Roveda, a Spanish representative at the Somerset House Conference on 22 August 1604.
  - no 356 A cup called a "colloke" made of serpentine with a silver-gilt cover, given by Sir John Mason as a New Year's gift in 1562. The silver was sent to the mint to be made into coin in 1600.
- Bowls
- Bowls (gilt)
- Bowls (parcel-gilt and silver)
- Pots (gilt)
- Pots (parcel-gilt and silver)
  - no. 539 Two gilt pots with rings around their bellies and angels and ciphers (initials) around their necks. Given to Juan Fernández de Velasco, 5th Duke of Frías, Constable of Castile, in August 1604 at the Somerset House Conference.
- Flagons and casting bottles (gilt)
- Flagons of glass or stone bound in velvet
- Spice plates
- Spice boxes
- Candlesticks and snuffers
- Spoons
- Goblets and glasses
- Jugs
- Tankards and Hanse pots
  - no. 872 A silver gilt tankard set with cameo heads, given in July 1579 to Edward Darcy, groom of the Privy Chamber, on his marriage to a daughter of Thomas Astley, another groom.
  - no. 874 A silver gilt jug shaped like a lion.
  - no. 876 A silver gilt jug shaped like an owl.
- Cruises (A type of tankard)
- Stoneware jugs
- Salt cellars
  - no. 998 A basin of silver-gilt designed by Hans Holbein the younger for Anne Boleyn.
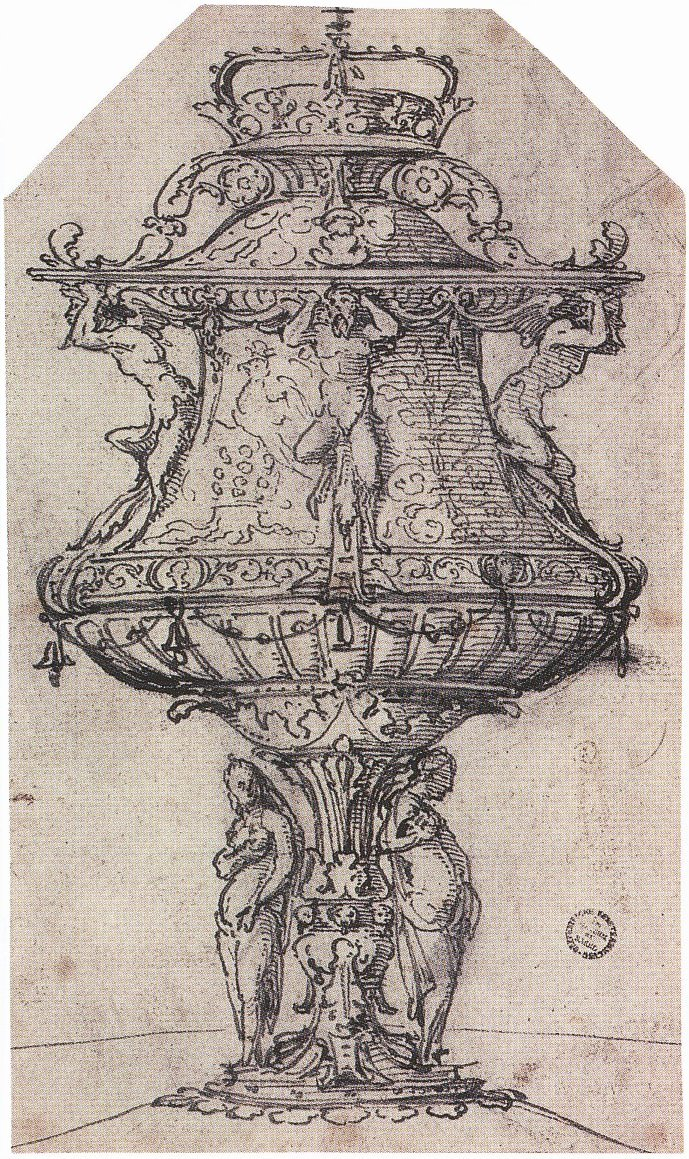
    The table fountain designed by Holbein for Anne Boleyn was item no. 998 in the 1574 inventory
    Declared unserviceable and sold in 1620.
- Basins, fountains, ewers and gilt lairs (a lair was a kind of ewer)
- Basins and ewers (parcel-gilt and silver)
- Chafing dishes
- Trenchers
- Knives
- 'Vessell' (gilt, parcel-gilt and silver)
  - Two great gilt laires or water pots. Made by Cornelis Hayes for Henry VIII, James VI and I gave them to Juan Fernández de Velasco y Tovar, 5th Duke of Frías, Constable of Castile, in 1604.
- Kitchen plate
  - no. 1305 An instrument of silver to roast puddings and apples. Melted down for coinage in October 1600.
- Orange strainers
  - no. 1314 A strainer for oranges with a long steel writhen pole.
  - no. 1320 A strainer for oranges of silver and gilt with two crystals in the handle, given by Sir George Howard, Master of the Armouries, in 1573.
- Perfume pans
  - no. 1322 A perfume pan of silver and gilt with pillars of crystal part broken, and a clock plated with gold and enamelled. Melted down in October 1600.

=== "Sundry parcelles" ===
- no. 1375 A gunpowder flask taken from the body of James IV at the Battle of Flodden.

=== Plate received on 10 January 1574 from the grooms of the Privy Chamber ===
- no. 1398 A cup of gold with cover holding an escutcheon given by the townsmen of Sandwich on 31 August 1573.

=== Accessions in 1575, 1576, 1577 ===
- no. 1429 Thirteen hooks of silver gilt made to fasten hangings or tapestry in the queen's privy chamber, made in 1575 and placed in the keeping of Dorothy Habington.
- no. 1433 Four gold toothpicks given by Mistress Elizabeth Snowe (died 1587), a gentlewoman in the Privy Chamber.
- no. 1440 A cup of agate set with rubies and emeralds given by Thomas Wilson, and delivered to Jewel House from the Privy Chamber by Henry Middlemore, groom of the privy chamber, the father of Mary Middlemore a maid of honour to Anne of Denmark.
- no. 1453 A jug of crystal with silver gilt with a phoenix at the top given by Lord Henry Seymour. Anna of Denmark had this jug during her lying-in while pregnant with Princess Sophia.

=== Additions recorded to 12 August 1594 ===
- no. 1483 Three gilt bowls with covers given by the town of Yarmouth in August 1578. Elizabeth did not visit the town because of an outbreak of plague.
- no. 1484 A fair standing bowl with a silver cover decorated with scenes of the story of Joseph given by the members of the Dutch church in Norwich on 19 August 1578.
- no. 1485 A cup with a cover of silver gilt given by the town of Thetford in August 1578.
- no. 1515 A basket of silver to use to clear away dining utensils, presented by Francis Drake at a banquet at Deptford in 1581.
- no. 1521 A double porringer and 4 silver boxes with silver gilt covers given by Blanche Parry.
- no. 1541 A great standing cup gilt, with a cover, the body garnished with "sundry vermin as snakes ewetes (newts) frogs and others", and laid with colours, the cover garnished with sundry men and beasts hunting with a stag at the top, supplied by Alderman Martin. This cup, probably made in Germany, was admired in the Tower of London by Lupold von Wedel in November 1584. It was a gift at the baptism of Prince Henry in August 1594.

== Jewels of Elizabeth I and the inventories ==
Portraits of Elizabeth depict jewels, and may indicate how they were worn. Her ruff in a portrait c.1595 is decorated with 25 red arrows of rubies feathered with pearls, and tall jewelled spikes top her hair echoing obelisks embroidered on her dress. Some of the jewellery shown in portraits reflects the pieces described in the inventories, a theme explored by the costume historian Janet Arnold, and the jewellery historian Diana Scarisbrick. Thomas Randolph mentioned that Elizabeth wore a ring on a black ribbon around her neck while walking in a palace garden in May 1564.

On 21 May 1559 Elizabeth selected a group of jewels from the Tower of London for a celebration with French ambassadors for the Treaty of Cateau-Cambrésis. These included two diamond-set brooches depicting David And Goliath, one with Goliath's armour composed of diamonds (a diamond-set example held by the Green Vault, Dresden is later), a jewel depicting several figures with the motto In Petra Christi sancta fient foedera, with chains set with gems and other jewels. It is not clear whether Elizabeth intended these items as gifts or wore them herself, but they were not included among the gifts listed by the Venetian ambassador.

Elizabeth took an interest in the making of jewels in London, in 1587 asking John Spilman, her household goldsmith, to employ English and foreign ("stranger") diamond cutters, ruby cutters, agate cutters, clockmakers, goldsmiths, and wire workers. When Elizabeth bought two expensive uncut diamonds in 1596, crystal substitute stones were made to set in a pattern piece of gold jewellery for her approval.

James VI and Anna of Denmark's agents in London bought a sapphire engraved with Elizabeth's portrait in 1599. A lady in waiting, and keeper of her jewellery, Blanche Parry, made an inventory in 1587, now held by the British Library, listing 628 pieces, which passed into the custody of Mary Radcliffe.

=== Jewels as gifts ===
Elizabeth received gifts of jewels from courtiers at New Year, and from diplomats. Lady Mary Sidney gave Elizabeth a pelican jewel as a New Year's Day gift in 1573, possibly as a reproach for Elizabeth's perceived ingratitude for nursing her in 1562 when she had smallpox and Sybil Penn died. Elizabeth soon gave the pelican brooch to Sidney's sister, the Countess of Huntingdon. Lady Stafford gave Elizabeth another gold pelican jewel in 1580, and two other pelican jewels appear in the inventories. At the Union of the Crowns, a "jewell of golde like a Pellican garnished with diamondes of sondrie sortes and bigness, under her feete three rubies and a triangle diamond" was issued to Sir George Home for James VI and I.

In January 1585 Catherine Howard, Countess of Nottingham gave her "a jewel of gold being a dolphin fully garnished with sparks of ruby with a personage upon his back having a lute in his hand", a representation of the classical myth of Arion. Ambrose Dudley, 3rd Earl of Warwick gave her a jewel in the form of bay leaves with roses, a spider and a bee, in 1572. The Spanish ambassador, Guerau de Espés, noted that in January 1571 the Earl of Leicester gave Elizabeth a jewel that was recognised to refer to Mary, Queen of Scots. An enamelled scene depicted Elizabeth enthroned with a queen in chains, and France and Spain submerged by waves as Neptune bowed to Elizabeth. For Espés, this device was typical of English boasting and bravado and was a warning for caution and the need to take advantage of opportunity and artifice for the preservation of Spanish power.

Elizabeth was given jewels during country house entertainments staged during her progresses. At the Ryecote Entertainment, the gifts represented the military activities of the sons of Sir Henry Norris. At the Harefield Entertainment in August 1602 Elizabeth was presented with a diamond feather (or heart) and an anchor. The two jewels were said to be worth £600 and £1000. When Christopher Hatton was unable to join her on a progress, he gave her a jewel featuring a bagpipe, which she wore on her ruff. This was an allusion to shepherds and sheep, Elizabeth's nickname for Hatton was "her mutton", as she herself explained to Sir Robert Cecil.

Elizabeth gave jewels to favoured courtiers, and sometimes to adventurers. In March 1583, she sent Humphrey Gilbert, who was about to set sail, as a token of her favour a jewel set with diamonds featuring a queen holding an anchor.

=== Jewels in the Stowe inventory ===
The inventory has three sections of jewels, the first group has 77 items kept by Elizabeth's lady in waiting Mary Radcliffe, the second section lists 19 jewels kept by the Countess of Nottingham and transferred to Thomas Gorges, Master of the Wardrobe, to make the inventory, and the third section lists 32 jewels kept by Mary Radcliffe passed to Gorges. After the inventory was taken by the auditor Francis Gofton, Gorges returned the jewels to Radcliffe on 28 May 1603. The entries have annotations in various hands which help to track the transfer of pieces to Anne of Denmark or their sale after the Union of the Crowns. Some entries are given below, abridged and with modernised spelling:

=== Stowe inventory, first section ===
- [3] Item, small aglets of gold, 46 pairs. Delivered 30 January 1604 to "Mr Robert Jessi". This may be the Scottish goldsmith Robert Jousie who was connected with King James' wardrobe.
- [13] A jewel of gold like an Angel, the body mother of pearl, the wings garnished with sparks of diamonds and rubies, and two antiques like horses under it garnished with like sparks of rubies and diamonds. Delivered 30 January 1604.
- [17] "one jewell like a frogg" of agate with three diamonds & a ruby on the head, with a pendant of four sparks of diamonds on a gold fleur de lys with other stones. On 30 January the pendant was removed and set on the pelican jewel.
- [71] A cap of black velvet with a band of ten buttons of gold, five set with sparks of diamonds and four small pearls, and five with four sparks of ruby and a pearl. 18 small gold buttons with small pearls, five buttons with sparks of diamonds, rubies and pearls in a feather.

=== Stowe inventory, second section ===
This jewels had been in the keeping of Catherine Howard, Countess of Nottingham and were delivered up to Thomas Gorges.

- [4] A jewel of gold like a circle of Pansies, Daisies, and other flowers, garnished with sparks of diamonds and rubies, with a butterfly of mother of pearl and a crab holding the same.
- [6] A jewel of gold like a Pelican garnished with diamonds of sundry sorts.
- [11] Buttons of gold with ragged staves and true loves with diamonds. These were probably the ornaments of a black velvet cap given to Elizabeth by the Earl of Leicester in 1580.

=== Stowe inventory, third section ===
- [8] Gold buttons like tortoises with a pearl. A number of these buttons had decorated the train of a black velvet gown.
- [11] A jewel of gold having two hands, one holding a sword, the other a trowel, both garnished with sparks of diamonds, and between the hands a garnishment of opal. This had been a New Year's Day gift in 1587. The device is a well-known emblem for peace and appears in Geoffrey Whitney's Choice of Emblems (London, 1586).
- [12] A jewel ofgold like a half moon garnished with sparks of diamonds and a crown above, with a litle pendant pearl. Originally a New Year's Day gift to Elizabeth with a more elaborate pendant featuring a diamond and two fishes.
- [27] A jewel of gold like a Daisy and small flowers about it garnished with sparks of diamonds and rubies with her Majesty's picture graven on a garnet, and a sprig of three branches garnished with sparks of rubies, a pearl at the top, and a small pendant of sparks of diamonds. A New Year's day gift in 1593.

=== Missing jewels in the Folger inventory ===
The Folger inventory (MS V.b.72) lists 22 jewels known to have been lost from Elizabeth's wardrobe. These include:

- [1] A button of gold with five pearls lost from her Majesty's kirtle at a play at Richmond at Christmas 1595
- [10] Item, a diamond from a jewel like a heart fully garnished with diamonds, lost by her Majesty 14 February 1596

== Elizabeth I and French jewellery ==
Elizabeth I, like Mary, Queen of Scots, bought jewellery in Paris. The diplomat Nicholas Throckmorton sent her a list of questions about prospective purchases in 1562, which give useful information about jewels worn in the 1560s and contemporary attitudes to purchasing and material literacy. Throckmorton discussed the borders and "billements" worn with hoods, noting that the length of a French style billement was different to those worn in England. There could be girdles and necklace chains in matching sets with the billements and borders. Some items were destined as gifts, and Throckmorton contrasted the cost of making, the "fashioning", with the weight of precious metal. Simple forms made by casting were much cheaper. His questions for Elizabeth were:

- How many borders, upper and nether, shall be bought?
- What number shall be engraved and "sicelled" which is the most costly fashion, and how many cast in the mold and wrought slightly which will be better cheap?
- Whether all the borders shall be enamelled, or some not?
- To know the length of the said borders, because the fashion is different here to there in the length of the "billements""
- Whether to every border there shall be a chain for the neck, and a girdle with a pendant and a vase, or at least to know how many chains and girdles with vases shall be provided.
- How many chains shall be provided for men, to be given in reward, and of what value, which ought rather to be of more show than fashion, because the fashion, if it be costly will eat up the weight?
- How many pomanders (as you term them) called here pommes of gold shall be provided, and whether there shall be any sweet paste put in them?
- Whether any bracelets shall be provided, and how many pairs?
- How many carcanets shall be provided?

This purchase of jewels and gold chains was first mooted for the time of the progress in the summer of 1561, for Elizabeth and the ladies of the court. Later, the Parisian jewellery may have been intended to be diplomatic gifts at the "interview", the planned meeting between Mary, Queen of Scots, and Elizabeth in England which never took place. The Earl of Pembroke became involved in buying the jewels and chains in Paris and there was some difficulty in obtaining credit from the Italian financier Guido Cavalcanti. One French piece listed in the queen's inventory was "a chain of Paris work being white and tawny "bugle" slightly garnished with gold".

== John Dymocke and Eric XIV of Sweden ==
William Cecil had previously written to Throckmorton in May 1561, before Mary had returned to Scotland from France, asking him to find a goldsmith in Paris to bring or send items for Elizabeth and her ladies to "be gay in this Court towards the progress". Cecil wrote about a jewellery purchase connected to a visit by Elizabeth's suitor, Eric XIV of Sweden. Anything unsold in England would be custom free. John Dymocke, who had been a soldier and a royal usher, had a licence to import jewels. He discussed patterns drawn on parchment with Kat Ashley and Elizabeth. Elizabeth was interested in a jewel with a large ruby and pearl pendant, and Dymocke claimed she jokingly said the King of Sweden would buy it for her. Dymock went to Sweden with a portrait painter. He gave Eric XIV a pair of perfumed gloves, and discussed jewels and Elizabeth's marriage plans, although he was not an accredited diplomat. There was a scandal and Kat Ashley and the chamberer Dorothy Bradbelt were banished from court for a time.

== Elizabeth's jewels after her death ==
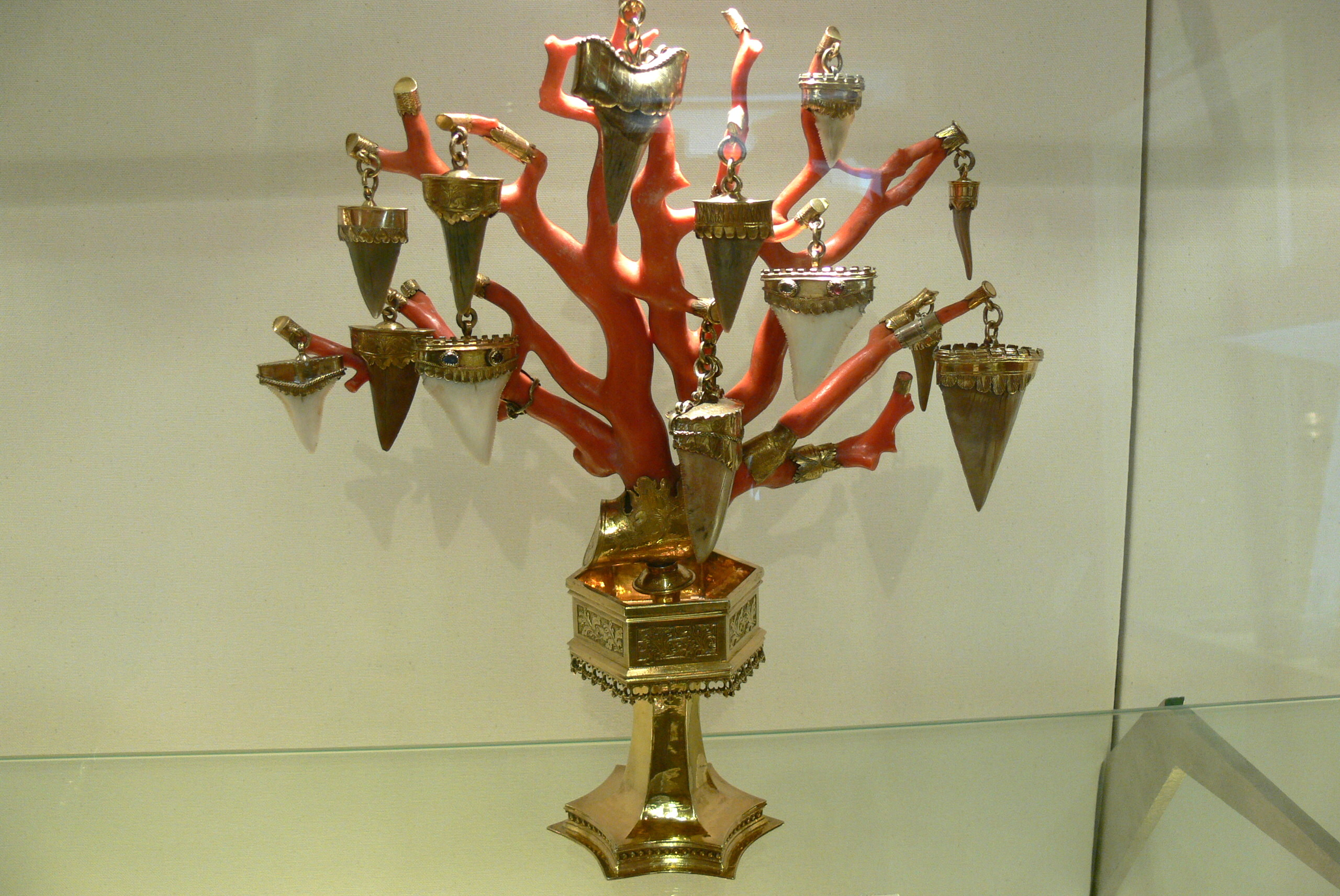
A 15th or 16th-century coral branch with "serpent's tongues" intended to test for poison, (Vienna, Treasury of the German Order)

Elizabeth had a quantity of old jewels from the Tower of London appraised for sale in October 1600 by the goldsmiths Hugh Kayle, John Spilman, and Leonard Bushe. The consignment included a number of unmounted precious stones and counterfeit imitations including "Dutch agates", gold rings and buttons set with stones and cameos, pearls, gold chains, beads, billements for headdresses, seven clocks, and scrap "broken" gold and silver. Some of the pearls had been sewn on a gown of Elizabeth, or perhaps a gown of Mary I of England.

The goldsmiths William Herrick and John Spilman reset a number of Elizabeth's gems on a gold circlet or coronet which Anne of Denmark wore to her English coronation on 25 July 1603. On 12 January 1604 Herrick and Spilman were asked to assess and make an inventory of jewels that had belonged to Queen Elizabeth. King James had already given many pieces to the queen, Princess Elizabeth, and Arbella Stuart and others. Some of the remaining jewels had been transferred from the keeping of Mary Radcliffe to the Countess of Suffolk. Several pieces were sold or exchanged with the goldsmith and financier Peter Vanlore. A list of jewels in the possession of Anne of Denmark in 1606 was published by Diana Scarisbrick, and includes several items formerly in Elizabeth's collection.

In December 1607, King James retrieved some of Elizabeth's jewels from the Jewel House and sent them to William Herrick and John Spilman to be refurbished. He gave his wife Anne of Denmark a cup made of unicorn's horn with a gold cover (believed to guard against poison) set with diamonds and pearls, a gold jug or ewer, a salt with a branch set with sapphires and serpent's tongues (really fossilized shark teeth, also a safeguard against poisoning), and a crystal chess board with topaz and crystal pieces. Later in the reign of James other lists of jewels were made, including those annexed to the crown in 1606, and those sent to Spain in 1623 at the time of the Spanish Match. These were printed in Thomas Rymer's Foedera.

== Costume records ==
An important surviving record of Elizabeth's costume is a wardrobe "day book" from 1561 to 1580, transcribed and published by Janet Arnold as Lost from Her Majesties Back in 1980. The book records deliveries of fabric to the Queen, many destinied to be gifts to her ladies in waiting, maids of honours, and chamberers. Many of these recipients signed the book. The record gives an insight into the pecking-order or hierarchy amongst these courtiers, assuming that more expensive and luxurious clothes were given to those of higher status enjoying royal favour. The record also includes the lost of jewels or precious clothing fasteners from the queen's clothes. The book is now in The National Archives (TNA), and was formerly in the collections at Holme Lacy in Herefordshire. Its intermediate provenance is uncertain, but it may have been in the possession of Mary Scudamore, a lady of the Privy Chamber. Other costume records from the royal wardrobe, including warrants, suggest that that there were other similar books, some concurrent, which are not known to have survived.

Some of the clothes mentioned in the "day book" were those discarded by Elizabeth, and it seems that the gentlewomen of privy chamber discussed who should be the final recipient. An entry for a safeguard riding skirt with matching doublet and a pair of sleeves given to an Irish gentlewoman was signed by Mary Scudamore, Bridget Chaworth and Jane Brussels, with the consent of all the gentlewomen.

== Bibliography ==
- Collins, Arthur Jefferies (1955). Jewels and Plate of Queen Elizabeth I: The Inventory of 1574. Trustees of the British Museum. ASIN B0006EIQUG.
