= Bulstrode =

Bulstrode may refer to:

== Places ==
- Bulstrode Park, Gerrards Cross, Buckinghamshire, England

== People ==
- Bulstrode Whitelocke, English lawyer
- Bulstrode (surname)

== Fictional characters ==
- Bulstrode (Thomas the Tank Engine), a character in the Railway Series by Christopher Awdry
- Millicent Bulstrode and Violetta Bulstrode, fictional characters in the Harry Potter series
- Mr. Bulstrode, the wealthy businessman, philanthropist, and zealous Evangelical in George Eliot's novel Middlemarch
- Rev. Kevin Bulstrode, Vicar of Skurfield, a character in Paradise Postponed the novel and TV series by John Mortimer
- Bulstrode Effingham, a character in W.S. Gilbert's farce Tom Cobb
