= Coronation of Queen Anne =

Coronation of Queen Anne may refer to:

- Coronation of Anne Boleyn in 1533
- Entry and coronation of Anne of Denmark as Queen of Scotland in 1590
  - Coronation of Anne of Denmark as Queen of England in 1603
