= John Eyre (died 1639) =

English courtier and ambassador (1580–1639)

Sir John Eyre (1580–1639), initially of Great Chalfield Manor, Wiltshire and later of St. Giles-in-the-Fields, Middlesex was an English courtier, ambassador and Member of Parliament.

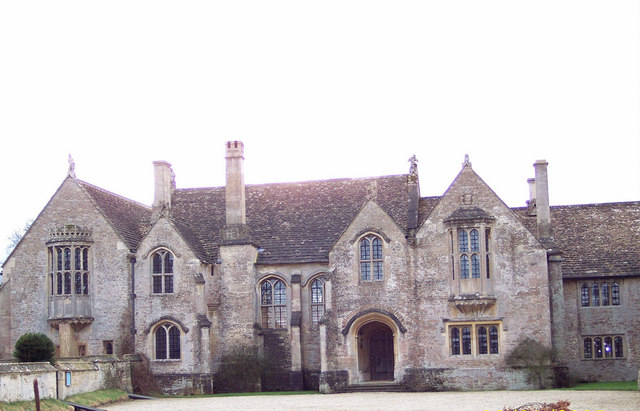
Great Chalfield Manor

He was the eldest son of Sir William Eyre of Great Chalfield, educated at Lincoln's Inn and knighted in 1605.

== A jealous husband ==
He married Dorothy Bulstrode or Boulstred, a lady in waiting to Anne of Denmark, and a younger sister of Cecily Bulstrode the subject of poems by Ben Jonson and John Donne.

In 1611 Eyre attempted to murder Sir Edward Herbert, whom he suspected of having an affair with his wife Dorothy Bulstrode, but escaped serious punishment. Herbert had written an epitaph on the death of Cecily Bulstrode in 1609. In his autobiography he gave a version of his encounter with "Sir John Ayres". According to Herbert, Anne of Denmark obtained his portrait by William Larkin and Dorothy had it copied in miniature by Isaac Oliver, and she wore it in a gold locket concealed to view. Herbert said Dorothy was of "an excellent wit and discourse", but claimed he knew her only slightly. However, he also described visiting her chamber at the palace at night and finding her examining the miniature by candlelight. Soon, following a summons to court from a "great lady", Robert Sidney, 1st Earl of Leicester, Lucy Russell, Countess of Bedford, and Elizabeth, Lady Hoby, another of the queen's gentlewomen, all sent Herbert warning that Sir John Eyre planned to murder him in his bed. Herbert got in touch with Eyre to ask if he would fight a duel, but the answer was unclear.

Eyre and four accomplices caught up with Herbert and his two footmen at Scotland Yard as he was leaving Whitehall Palace, and wounded his horse several times. Eyre broke Herbert's sword. Twenty more men appeared, Herbert thought them Eyre's supporters and attendants of the Earl of Suffolk. Two other men helped Herbert, and after a prolonged struggle he wounded Eyre, who was carried to the Thames vomiting. A few days later Eyre sent a message that he would kill Herbert with "a musket out of a window". Meanwhile, because Eyre claimed Dorothy had confessed to being unfaithful, she sent a letter to her aunt Lady Croke denying this, and Herbert was able to give this letter to the Privy Council. The Duke of Lennox said that John Eyre was "the most miserable man living" because of the shame of Dorothy's letter, and because his father had disinherited him on hearing of the assault.

== Courtier and ambassador ==
He was appointed a Gentleman of the Privy Chamber by 1612, and received a gift of £500 from the king, serving to at least 1632.

He was the member of Parliament for Cricklade in 1614, Calne in 1626, and Chippenham in 1628. He succeeded his father to Great Chalfield in 1629 but sold it two years later to Sir Richard Gurney, Lord Mayor of London, living afterwards in St. Giles-in-the-Fields, London.

In April 1619 his younger brother fought a duel with Sir Henry Rich but neither were hurt.

He was ambassador to Ottoman Empire in 1619–1621 at the court of Sultan Osman II.

== Card games ==
The Duke of Buckingham mentioned "John Ayres" in his letters to King James, once describing a card game, "I have played six sets at maw with Sir John Ayres, and truly it's a vaet hard match. What shall I do then with him that eats cold custard with bunglers?". The game of maw was popular in England and Scotland, and was played at Hengrave Hall at Christmas 1572.

He died in financially straitened circumstances in 1639, leaving just 5 shillings to his wife.

== Family ==
John Eyre married, by 1610, Dorothy Bulstrode (1592–1650), the daughter of Edward Bulstrode of Hedgerley, Buckinghamshire, and Cecill Croke. Dorothy and her sister Cecily Boulstred (1584–1609) were both gentlewomen in the bedchamber of Anne of Denmark, and associated with Lucy Russell, Countess of Bedford. (Their grandmother Elizabeth Unton, Lady Croke had a connection to the Harington family.) The queen gave presents of clothing to her gentlewomen, and gave Dorothy, "Lady Eayres", a gown of ash-colour taffeta on 4 July 1610 and a black satin gown on 14 October 1610. Another sister Anne Bulstrode (d. 1611) married the lawyer John Searle (1569–1622) in 1609, and their eldest sister Elizabeth (1575–1631) had married the lawyer James Whitelocke in 1602.

Whitelocke recorded that Eyre and Bulstrode were married without the consent of either family, and wrote, "the man is one of the most dissolute, unjust, and vicious reprobates that lives upon the face of the earth". They had a son who predeceased John Eyre, born in October 1611 at Flambards at Cold Norton, Essex, the house of Dorothy's mother Cecill, now Lady Brown.

Dorothy Eyre later married John Clyffe (1597–1674). She died in 1650 and was buried at St Mary's, Upton Grey, Hampshire, where she has a marble or alabaster wall monument with her portrait bust and heraldry, and also a further wooden board with verses commemorating her. The monument's inscription was printed in the Gentleman's Magazine which alludes to her medicinal practices, and that other daughters were "wise" but she was "best", but the verses were not published, "not being remarkable for their goodness."
