= Cornelis Hayes =

Cornelis Hayes or Heys (died 1547) was a Flemish jeweller who settled in London in 1524.

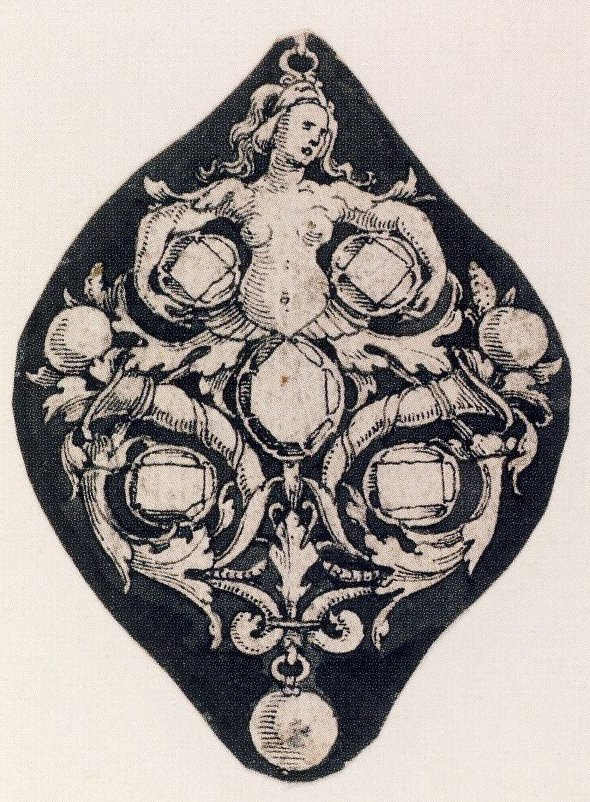
Cornelis Heyes may have made jewellery and tableware following the designs of Hans Holbein the younger.

== Career and works ==
In 1524 uncut diamonds from the wreck of the Martyn at Chichester were brought to Hayes by the wife of Arnold Stotlz, a brewer of Portsmouth. Hayes reported this to the authorities.

In January 1527 Hayes supplied a jewel with 19 diamonds "set in trueloves of gold", love knots, possibly for Anne Boleyn to wear on Valentine's day.

Goldsmiths who supplied plate to Henry VIII, especially for the distribution of New Year's Day gifts to courtiers, include Hayes, Robert Amadas, William Davy, John Freman, Nicholas Trapp, and Morgan Wolf. Hayes gave Henry VIII a pair of gloves "garnished with gold" and two small fresh unsalted surgeons for New Year's Day 1529.

Hayes made gilt pommels with roses and royal ciphers for a bed that Henry VIII used while hunting. He sold 19 diamonds to Henry VIII for the head dress of Anne Boleyn in December 1530, and, on another occasion a gold girdle, an emerald ring, and a jewel featuring a Catherine wheel set with thirteen diamonds. He also made spangles, a variety of sequin for embroidery for the costumes of the royal guard. In 1531 he was allowed to expand his workshop with six foreign apprentices and 12 journeymen.

Hayes repaired a sceptre for the Coronation of Anne Boleyn in 1533, and in 1534 made a silver cradle, apparently for her second pregnancy. Figures of Adam and Eve were painted by Hans Holbein the younger, Hayes moulded apples in relief.

Hayes converted the arms of Cardinal Wolsey on gilt plate to Henry's royal arms, and restored enamel work. Hayes exchanged a gilt pomegranate, an emblem of Catherine of Aragon, on the cover of a salt from the queen's pantry for a rose. He twice repaired a table salt from the royal pantry originally made for Richard III that had a figure of a "Morion", a representation of an African man holding the covered salt dish, which was vulnerable to damage. The account notes, "a salte of golde with a cover called the Murrion whereof the murrion hede was broken in the necke that holdeth up the salte", and "the leggs of the murrion was broken". Richard III had pledged the Murrion salt to Richard Gardiner for a loan, redeemed by Henry VII.

In February 1535 Ralph Sadler and Stephen Vaughan made an inventory of jewels supplied by Hayes to Henry VIII, which includes 60 great pearls and 440 lesser pearls, with a crapault or toadstone, prized as an antidote to poison.

Hayes and the Welsh goldsmith Morgan Phelippe alias Wolf provided silver plate for the entourage of Anne of Cleves. Hayes was appointed her household goldsmith. "Cornellys Harys" supplied silver plate to Princess Mary in 1543 and 1544, some to serve as New Year's Day gifts.

Hayes made a "laire" or water pot in 1537 with a monogram of "H" and "J" for Jane Seymour, engraved with a scene of Lucretia killing herself, and a pair of gilt bottles featuring dragons. These pieces were recorded in the inventory of Elizabeth I.

Hayes may have realised designs for jewelry drawn by Hans Holbein.

He lived in the parish of All-Hallows-the-Great. His workmen or servants in 1541 included, Lambert Wolf, John Pynne, John Barnett or Barnard, and Sympson Gladbeck.

He married Anne, the widow of Oliver Claymound. He bequeathed his properties outside England, "beyond sea", to his friends the glazier Galyon Hone and the goldsmith Paul Fryling, who were to serve as overseers of his will.

== Kremlin water pots ==
James VI and I gave two great water pots that Hayes had made to Juan Fernández de Velasco y Tovar, 5th Duke of Frías, Constable of Castile, in 1604. Drawings were made of these treasures, and water pots made by William Jefferies in 1605 acquired by the Tsar, Michael of Russia, from Fabian Smith alias Ulyanov in 1629 may be replicas of Hayes's work. These pots are in the Kremlin Armoury Museum.

Some replicas of the silver plate were made in 1608 and the Auditor Francis Gofton supervised the commission with instructions for the Privy Council of England.

The Kremlin pots have dragon spouts and snake handles, as did another pot listed in Elizabeth's inventory, and two such pots appear in an inventory of 1607 drawn up by the goldsmith John Williams.
