= Thomas Chamberlayne (judge) =

English judge

Portrait of Sir Thomas Chamberlayne, dated 1619, with an inscription commemorating his appointment as Chief-Justice of Chester. School of Marcus Gheeraerts the Younger. Collection of Sir George Dashwood, 6th Baronet.

Sir Thomas Chamberlayne, SL (died 27 September 1625), was an English judge who served as Chief Justice of Chester during the reign of James I of England.

== Life ==
Chamberlayne, the son of an English settler in Ireland, entered Gray's Inn in 1578 and became a barrister in 1585. As steward to Lord Ellesmere and, from 1591, solicitor to Lord Berkeley, he seems to have been reasonably well off and was able to contribute to building projects at Gray's Inn and invest in lands in Oxfordshire. In 1608, he became the recorder of Banbury, a post he would hold until his death.

In 1612, Chamberlayne married Elizabeth Fermor, widow of Sir William Stafford of Blatherwick, and in 1614 was made a serjeant-at-law. His judicial career began in 1615 with an appointment as justice of the Anglesey circuit, and the following year he was made Chief Justice of Chester and knighted. In 1620 he became a Justice of the Court of King's Bench and was apparently considered, but passed over, for the post of Master of the Rolls in 1621. Friction between his successor as Chief Justice of Chester, Sir James Whitelocke, and the Earl of Northampton, Lord President of Wales, led to his return to that position in 1624.

== Family ==
His first wife having died in 1620, in 1622 Chamberlayne married Elizabeth Carey, daughter of Lord Hunsdon and widow of Sir Thomas Berkeley. Chamberlayne died on 27 September 1625. His eldest son, Thomas, was later created a baronet.

== Notes ==
Legal offices
Preceded by Sir Richard Lewknor	Chief Justice of Chester; 1616–1620	Succeeded by Sir James Whitelocke
Preceded by Sir James Whitelocke	Chief Justice of Chester; 1624–1625	Succeeded by Sir John Bridgeman
