= Richard Bulstrode =

English author, diplomat and soldier

Sir Richard Bulstrode (1610 – 3 October 1711) was an English writer, diplomat and soldier, a son of Edward Bulstrode (1588–1659).

== Life and family ==
Richard Bulstrode was born at Astley, Warwickshire, and educated at Pembroke College, Cambridge. After studying law in London he joined the army of Charles I on the outbreak of the Civil War in 1642. In 1673 he became a resident agent of Charles II at Brussels; in 1675 he was knighted; then following James II into exile. The king gave him a pension of 166 livres per month. He died at St. Germain on 3 October 1711.

Bulstrode is chiefly known by his Memoirs and Reflections upon the Reign and Government of King Charles I (1721). He wrote the Life of James II, and Original Letters written to the Earl of Arlington (1712). The latter consists principally of letters written from Brussels giving an account of the important events which took place in the Netherlands during 1674.

His second son Whitelocke Bulstrode (1650–1724), remained in England after the flight of James II; he held some official positions, and in 1717 wrote a pamphlet in support of George I and the succession of the House of Hanover. He published A Discourse of Natural Philosophy, and was a prominent Protestant controversialist. He died in London on 27 November 1724.
