= Cecily Bulstrode =

English courtier

Cecily Bulstrode (1584 – 4 August 1609) was a courtier and subject of poetry. She was the daughter of Edward Bulstrode (1550–1595) and Cecily Croke; she was a cousin of Lucy Russell, Countess of Bedford, in whose household she was a member in 1605. Two years later, she served as a Gentlewoman of the Bedchamber to Anne of Denmark.

== Life ==
=== Early life ===
She was born to Edward Bulstrode (1550–1595) of Hedgerley in Buckinghamshire and Cecily or Cecill Croke (fl. 1575–1608), the daughter of Sir John Croke of Chilton, in Beaconsfield. Her parents Edward and Cecily produced nine other children, amongst them Edward (1588-1659), who served as a judge in the courts of chancery, king's bench, the Oxford assize circuits, and the Warwickshire quarter sessions throughout his lifetime. Cecily was the fourth of six daughters; the names of her nine siblings are recorded on her father's tomb at St Laurence's Church, Upton-cum-Chalvey.

Bulstrode was baptized at Beaconsfield on 12 February 1584, Spelling variations on her first and last name include "Cecilia", "Celia", and "Boulstred".

In June 1608 Bulstrode's mother Cecily married again, to Sir John Brown of Flamberds, at Cold Norton, Essex. Her grandfather Sir John Croke died at Chilton in February 1609.

=== Life at Court ===
Bulstrode followed in the footsteps of her ancestors as a courtier. In 1605, she became part of the entourage of her mother's first cousin Lucy Russell, Countess of Bedford. When King James I came to the throne, the countess of Bedford became First Lady of the Bedchamber to the queen. Bulstrode and her youngest sister Dorothy, later Lady Eyre, moved up with Lucy Russell, becoming Maidens of the Queen's Bedchamber. There, Bulstrode "became a noted wit in the court of James I." As a good friend of the countess of Bedford and servant of the Queen, Bulstrode was a lady of consequence at court.

During her time at the court of Anne of Denmark, Bulstrode became the subject of works by poets such as Ben Jonson who threatened her reputation with rumours of promiscuity. Other writers, including John Donne, used the event of her death as an opportunity to gain favor with her friend and patron of the literary arts, the countess of Bedford. The only known work of Bulstrode's is News of My Morning Work, probably written in 1609.

While at court, Bulstrode became the topic of scandalous rumour. She had a brief courtship, and possible engagement, with Sir John Roe in 1602. The reason for their breakup is unknown, but in To Mistress Boulsted, 1602 an elegy ghost-written for Roe by his friend Ben Jonson, Bulstrode seems accused of sluttish behavior:

Shall I go force an elegy? abuse
My wit, and break the hymen of my Muse
For one poor hour’s love?...
I’ll have a Succuba as good as you!

-An Elegy to Mistress Boulsted, 1602 lines 1-3, 24

This poem circulated at court as a letter to Bulstrode from "J.R." presumably John Roe. The poem takes the viewpoint of a man who rejects the advances of his female friend because he doesn't want to ruin their friendship "for one poor hour’s love." Although the speaker claims to be a sincere friend who will keep the poem secret to protect her reputation, the poem was not kept secret and was most likely an attempt to ruin Bulstrode's reputation and allege, according to Donald Foster, “that Boulstred solicited Roe for sex, which caused him to reject her as unfit for marriage.” In 1628, Ben Jonson revealed that he actually ghostwrote this poem for Roe.

Boulstred eventually started a relationship with Sir Thomas Roe, Sir John Roe's cousin. This relationship most likely would have led to marriage if she had not become very sick in 1609. In 1609 over a few months, Bulstrode fell ill and died. Her illness was diagnosed by doctors of the College of Medicine as "the mother" also called the "wandering womb", an imprecise diagnosis for ailments thought to attend upon feminine frailty. Her symptoms included stomach pain, sleeplessness, fever, and vomiting. No cure could be found, and she wasted away at the countess of Bedford's house, Twickenham Park, unable to hold down food or liquids. In a letter to Sir Henry Goodyere, John Donne reported on her condition;

"I fear earnestly that Mistress Boulstred will not escape that sickness in which she labors at this time. I sent this morning to ask of her passage of this night; and the return is, that she is as I left her yesternight... [I] fear that she will scare last so long as that you, when you receive this letter, may do her any good office in praying for her.”

According to Dr. Francis Anthony, who was called upon by Bulstrode's mother after treatment under the College of Medicine physicians was unsuccessful, she showed improvement in symptoms in her final days, "for in all the other administering of this medicine ... her spirits were relieved! She daily recovered strength. All passions, symptoms, and accidents of disease ceased. Her sickness fully left her, and she recovered perfect health!"

But in regard to her “perfect health,” Anthony exaggerated. Although he gave her doses of potable gold in an attempt to cure her, Bulstrode died within days. As Jongsook Lee puts it, Anthony was "a quack." Bulstrode's brother in-law, James Whitlocke noted her death, "Cecill Bulstrode, my wife’s sister, gentlewoman to Queen An, ordinary of her bedchamber, died at Twitnam in Middlesex, the earl of Bedford’s house, 4 August 1609", and she was buried at St Mary's, Twickenham two days later.

Although Sir Thomas Roe missed his chance to marry Bulstrode, his love for her remained, and he carried a miniature watercolour portrait of her around with him for the rest of his life, even after he married.

In death, Bulstrode's body became a theme of court poets who competed for the literary matronage of her Lucy Russell, countess of Bedford. Lucy Russell's favour was highly valued, as she had a large amount of power and leverage at court as first Lady of the Queen's Bedchamber.

== Literary references ==
=== Sir John Roe ===
The poems True Love Finds Wit and An Elegy to Mistress Boulstred have been attributed to Sir John Roe. The former describes Bulstrode as a “Wench at Court.” Ben Jonson claimed authorship of the latter in his play The New Inn in 1628/9.

=== Ben Jonson ===
Jonson continued to write about Bulstrode, most of it of a slanderous nature. In 1603/4, Jonson and Roe were kicked out of a masque at Hampton Court, an instance which Jonson blamed Bulstrode for and wrote about in his play The New Inn (1628/9).

The most well-known of his literary jabs at Bulstrode is his Epigram on the Court Pucell which has been called a "disturbingly ‘personal’ attack on a woman." Jonson supposedly wrote this poem as a response to a criticism she made of his play draft Epicoene: the Silent Woman. In 1619, in a conversation with the Scottish poet, William Drummond of Hawthonden, Jonson claimed that his epigram was stolen out of his pocket when he was drunk and given to Bulstrode, which he had not wanted to happen. The word "pucell" was an early modern term for prostitute, and "Cell" or "Sell" as short form for "Cecily", so Jonson seems to be calling Bulstrode a prostitute in this poem. He also accuses her of being promiscuous, bisexual, pretentious, hypocritical, and more. His accusation of bisexuality stems from her close relationship with Lucy Russell, Countess of Bedford. However, another reading of the poem is that rather than a direct criticism of Bulstrode, the work was intended to evoke a "generic court pucelle", and by that means, an image of the false world. In another reading, the poem is a representation of Jonson's frustration with having to rely on women, like the countess of Bedford, for literary success. Lucy Russell was the matron of many writers, such as John Donne, and Jonson attempted to gain her matronage for many years. Jonson may have been frustrated by this apparent "inversion of traditional gender codes", so he used the "trope of prostitution" to reassert his position of power as a male.

Jonson came to fear that his poetic attack on Bulstrode lost him the favour of Anne of Denmark. Jonson wrote the Epitaph on Cecilia Bulstrode in response to her death. This poem paints a very different picture of Bulstrode. It seems to retract the charges Jonson made in the epigram point by point. He calls her a virgin, the fourth Grace, a teacher to language to Pallas and modesty to Cynthia, conscientious, and good. Jonson seems to have written the epitaph for George Garrard. The reason behind Jonson's supposed change of heart is unknown. The likely reason is that he wanted to gain the favor of Lucy Russell, which he had been attempting to do for years. Jonson may have experienced true regret for his slanderous words after hearing of her painful death. However, in 1619, Jonson told Drummond that he still enjoyed reciting Verses on the Pucelle of the Court Mistriss Boulstred.

Victoria Price has suggested the character Lady Centaure in Jonson's Epicœne, or The Silent Woman represents Cecily Bulstrode, her name thinly coded using the letters "Ce" and "taurus" to allude to a bull. For Tristan Marshall, aspects of the character, particularly allusions to horse riding, suggest that Lady Centuare was intended for Anne of Denmark.

=== John Donne ===
John Donne was under the matronage of Lucy Russell, Countess of Bedford, during the time that Bulstrode fell ill and died. He visited her when she was sick at Twickenham Park and concluded that she was suffering from hysteria. After she died, he wrote two poems in her honour, Elegy on Mistress Boulstred and Elegy Upon the Death of Mistress Boulstred. The former poem characterizes Death as an "all-consuming glutton who swallows the good" and argues that Bulstrode was one of the good. The latter poem says that Death is no longer needed because Bulstrode was the epitome of virtue, and now that she is dead, it is as if the entire world is dead. Donne may have written these elegies in the hope of getting a reward from his literary matron Lucy Russell. These poems circulated in manuscript and were included in verse miscellanies.

Donne's first Elegy for Bulstrode, opens with the image that Death's table is set with animals, vegetables, and the Human race, all alike;

Death I recant, and say, unsaid by me
Whate'er hath slipped, that might diminish thee.
Spiritual treason, atheism 'tis, to say,
That any can thy summons disobey.
Th'earth's race is but thy table; there are set
Plants, cattle, men, dishes for Death to eat.
In a rude hunger now he millions draws
Into his bloody, or plaguey, or starved jaws.
Now he will seem to spare, and doth more waste,
Eating the best first, well preserved to last.

Donne's second Elegy addresses Sorrow personified, Bulstrode in life was a gem, clear and pure like a blue sapphire;

Sorrow, to whom we owe all that we be,
Tyrant, in the fifth and greatest monarchy,
Was't, that she did possess all hearts before,
Thou hast killed her, to make thy empire more?
Knew'st thou some would, that knew her not, lament,
As in a deluge perish th'innocent?
Was't not enough to have that palace won,
But thou must raze it too, that was undone?
Hadst thou stayed there, and looked out at her eyes,
All had adored thee that now from thee flies,
For they let out more light, than they took in,
They told not when, but did the day begin;
She was too sapphirine, and clear for thee;
Clay, flint, and jet now thy fit dwellings be;
Alas, she was too pure, but not too weak;
Whoe'er saw crystal ordinance but would break?

=== Lucy Russell ===
The countess of Bedford wrote Elegy on Mistress Boulstred in response to Donne's first elegy characterizing Death as a gluttonous monster. In the poem, she refers to Donne's Holy Sonnet 10, which starts with the famous line, "Death be not proud". Russell argues that Donne's interpretation of Death was more accurate in the Holy Sonnet than in his elegy. Death is something that should not be proud, and that Donne's elegy gave Death too much credit. As a Christian, Bulstrode went to Heaven when she died, and Donne did not give her enough credit when he characterized her as a helpless victim of Death in his elegy. Perhaps responding to this criticism, Donne's second elegy focusses on Bulstrode's virtues instead of on Death.

Bedford's Elegy has an image of Bulstrode's breast as a crystal palace and the repository of her soul, clearer than the crystal;

From out the Christall Pallace of her brest
The clearer soule was call'd to endlesse rest.

=== Sir Edward Herbert ===
Sir Edward Herbert was a friend of Jonson's as well as Sir Thomas and Sir John Roe. In July 1609 he commemorated Bulstrode's death with theEpitaph. Caecil. Boulser. Though the full Latin title of the poem implies that Bulstrode died with an "unquiet spirit and conscience", the poem itself characterizes her as a highly religious virgin who resisted all sin up until her "noble soul" entered Heaven. Like others, Herbert in his commemoration was most likely trying to win Russell's support. Herbert fought over the hair-ribbon of Mary Middlemore, one of Bulstrode's companions at court in December 1609, and in 1611 became involved with Bulstrode's sister Dorothy Bulstrode, driving her husband Sir John Eyre to assault him.

== Works ==
News of My Morning Work is the only known work credited to Bulstrode, though scholar John Considine says "more ... by her may lie undiscovered". In this "witty piece", Bulstrode utilizes the satirical news form then common that "flourished" in Russell's circle from 1605 to 1610. As per the genre, News of My Morning Work consists of a list of moral and satirical aphorisms. Several of them are humorous criticisms of court and of people who claim to be religious:

THAT to be good, the way is to be most alone—or the best accompanied.
That the way to Heaven is mistaken for the most melancholy walk.
That the most fear of the world’s opinion more than God’s displeasure.
That a Court-friend seldom goes further than the first degree of charity.
That the Devil is the perfect courtier.

-News of My Morning Work lines 1-5

Toward the end she writes: "That a man with a female wit is the worst hermaphrodite". This is perhaps the most memorable line, and has been interpreted by many as a jab at Ben Jonson, who "had a career-long interest in hermaphroditism" according to Foster and Banton, as evident in his works Cynthia’s Revels, Volpone, and Epicoene. However, not all agree, Robert W. Halli, Jr. points out that this is only one line of many that is being unfairly singled out and misinterpreted. For Victoria E. White, “how this [line] is” immediately “relevant to Jonson is not apparent."

News of My Morning Work was likely written around 1609, but did not rise to prominence until it was published amongst other short pieces as a supplement to Sir Thomas Overbury’s A Wife in 1615, which became "an instant bestseller." Overbury's poem was published along with News articles such as Bulstrode's after it was discovered that Overbury had been murdered by the woman he wrote the poem about, making the publication a huge hit. A line in Jonson's Epigram on the Court Pucell reads, "And in an Epicoene fury can write News / Equal with that which for the best News goes", which may imply that the News articles published with Overbury's poem were written by Bulstrode's friends and that News of My Morning Work was written by Bulstrode. Some contributions were written by Benjamin Rudyerd, and Bulstrode's appears to be a response to his News from My Lodging. The publication itself only identifies the author of News of my Morning Work as a "Mris B."

According to Price, Bulstrode wrote the piece in the style conforming to what Halli calls "a precise formula, which includes a declarative beginning, a series of noun clauses, conceited similes and metaphors, and an effective concluding praise."

== Sources ==
- Text of Newes of my Morning Work from Early English Books Online
- Cecilia Bulstrode, from The Twickenham Museum
- Sir Edward Herbert's Epitaph for Cecily Bulstrode, Early English Books online
- John Donne, 'Elegy on Mistress Boulstred'. Poetry Nook.
- John Donne, 'Elegy upon the Death of Mistress Boulstred'. Poetry Nook.
