= Dorothy Bulstrode =

Lady-in-waiting to Anne of Denmark

Dorothy Bulstrode or Boulstred (1592–1650) was a lady-in-waiting to Anne of Denmark. One of her older sisters was Cecily Bulstrode, who was the subject of poems by Ben Jonson and John Donne.

== Childhood ==
She was the youngest of six daughters of Edward Bulstrode (d. 1598) of Hedgerley, Buckinghamshire, and Cecill Croke who married in London on 28 May 1571 at St Dunstan-in-the-West. The names of her siblings are recorded on her father's tomb at St Laurence's Church, Upton-cum-Chalvey.

Dorothy's eldest sister Elizabeth (1575-1631) married the lawyer James Whitelocke in 1602. Elizabeth was mother to Bulstrode Whitelocke,(1605-1675), prominent parliamentarian, lawyer and Ambassador to the Swedish Court of Queen Christina for the New Commonwealth under Oliver Cromwell. Another sister Anne Bulstrode (d. 1611) married the lawyer John Searle (1569-1622) in 1609. Her grandfather Sir John Croke died at Chilton in February 1609, leaving in his will £100 "to my daughter Bulstrode towards the preferment of her daughters unmarried".

== Life at court ==
Dorothy and her older sister Cecily Bulstrode (1584-1609) were both gentlewomen in the bedchamber of Anne of Denmark, and associated with the influential courtier Lucy Russell, Countess of Bedford. They had a family connection to Lady Bedford's Harington family through their aunt Cecily Bulstrode who married her grandfather Robert Keilway.

Bulstrode was involved in the queen's masques, and on one occasion took delivery of a sceptre with a dove from the Royal Jewelhouse as a prop. A wing was lost.

=== Marriage ===
She married in 1609 or 1610, Sir John Eyre (1580-1639), or "Ayres" of Great Chalfield Manor, Wiltshire. After her marriage, Dorothy was known as "Lady Eyre" or "Lady Ayres". James Whitelocke, recalling the events of 1611, recorded that Eyre and Bulstrode were married without the consent of either family, and wrote, "the man is one of the most dissolute, unjust, and vicious reprobates that lives upon the face of the earth".

Anna of Denmark gave presents of clothing to her gentlewomen, and gave Dorothy, "Lady Eayres", a gown of ash-colour taffeta on 4 July 1610 and a black satin gown on 14 October 1610.

=== Portraits and jealousy ===
In 1611, John Eyre attempted to murder Sir Edward Herbert, whom he suspected of having an affair with his wife Dorothy Bulstrode. Herbert, two years earlier, had written an epitaph for Dorothy's sister Cecily. In his autobiography he describes his encounter with "Sir John Ayres" in detail. According to Herbert, Anne of Denmark obtained his portrait by William Larkin and Dorothy had it copied in miniature by Isaac Oliver, and she wore it in a gold locket concealed to view. Herbert wrote, she "wore it about her neck so low that she hid it under her breasts". Herbert thought this the cause of Sir John Eyre's jealousy, and although Dorothy was of "an excellent wit and discourse", Herbert claimed he knew her only slightly. However, he also described visiting her chamber at the palace and finding her in bed examining the miniature by candlelight. Soon, following a summons to court from a "great lady", Herbert received warnings from Robert Sidney, 1st Earl of Leicester, the Countess of Bedford, and Elizabeth, Lady Hoby another of the queen's gentlewomen, that Sir John Eyre planned to murder him in his bed. Herbert got in touch with Eyre to ask if he would fight a duel, but the answer was unclear.

Eyre and four accomplices caught up with Herbert and his two footmen at Scotland Yard as he was leaving Whitehall Palace, and wounded his horse several times. Eyre broke Herbert's sword. Two other men helped Herbert, and after a prolonged struggle Herbert wounded Eyre, who was carried to the Thames vomiting. A few days later Eyre sent a message that he would kill Herbert with "a musket out of a window". Meanwhile, because Eyre publicly claimed Dorothy had confessed to being unfaithful, she sent a letter to her aunt Lady Croke denying this, and Herbert was able to give this letter to the Privy Council. The Duke of Lennox said that John Eyre was "the most miserable man living" because of the shame of Dorothy's letter proving him a liar, and because his father had disinherited him on hearing of the assault.

Herbert mentions that during the assault there were spectators of the "Suffolk faction" sided with Eyre, and the year before Herbert had fought with Lord Howard de Walden in Germany. Dorothy was pregnant and Eyre may have believed Herbert was the father of the child. Dorothy's son William Eyre was born in October 1611 at Flambards at Cold Norton, Essex, the house of Dorothy's mother Cecill, now Lady Brown. The child presumably died young, as he was not mentioned in Eyre's will.

James Whitelocke described the christening of his own son James in May 1612. One godparent was Humphrey May (1573-1630), groom of the king's privy chamber, Whitelocke wrote he "should have been for Dorothy", apparently meaning he would have preferred him as a brother-in-law rather than the "reprobate" Eyre. May had been Whitelocke's friend at St John's College, Oxford and in chambers at the Inns of Court.

Eyre died in comparative poverty in 1639, leaving just 5 shillings to his wife.

== Later life and death ==
Dorothy Eyre later married John Clyffe (1597-1674).

She died in 1650 and was buried at St Mary's, Upton Grey, Hampshire, where she has a marble or alabaster wall monument with her portrait bust and heraldry, and also a further wooden board with verses commemorating her. The monument's inscription was printed in the Gentleman's Magazine which alludes to her medicinal practices, and that other daughters were "wise" but she was "best", but the verses were not published, "not being remarkable for their goodness." In his will, John Clyffe wished to buried close to his wife "Lady Eyres", and he is commemorated by a ledger stone in the church.
