= Francis Bulstrode =

Francis Bulstrode (by 1515-68 or later), of Brogborough, Bedfordshire and Netherton, Worcestershire, was an English Member of Parliament (MP).

He was a Member of the Parliament of England for Lichfield in 1555.
