= Beatrix Bulstrode =

British journalist and explorer

Beatrix Timbrell Bulstrode
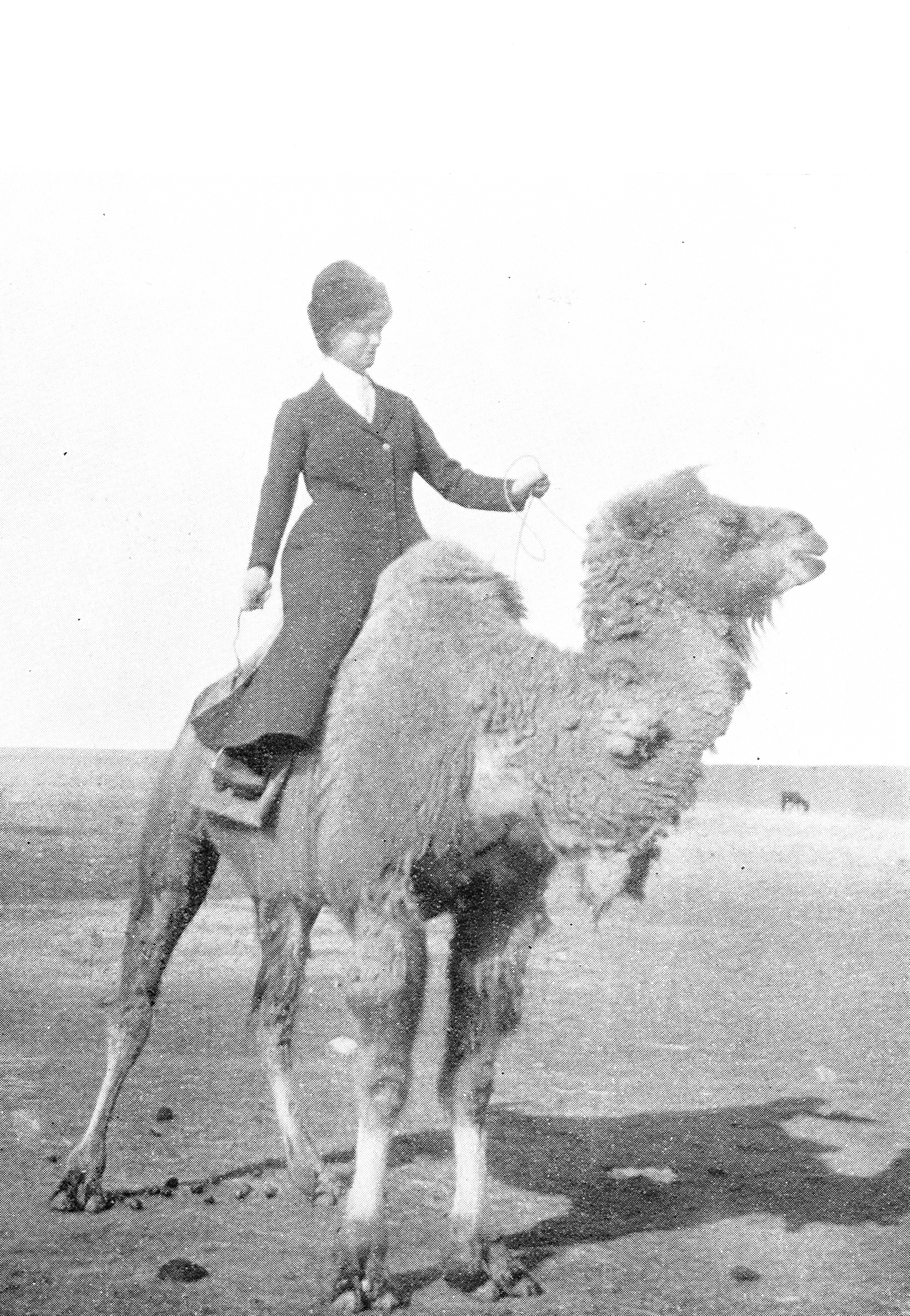
- Beatrix Bulstrode on a camel
- Born: Mary Beatrix Nunns; 1869
- Died: 1951 (aged 81–82)
- Other name: Beatrix Manico Gull
- Occupations: Journalist and explorer
- Known for: Travels in China and Mongolia
- Notable work: A Tour in Mongolia

Beatrix Timbrell Bulstrode (born Mary Beatrix Nunns in 1869, later known as Beatrix Manico Gull after her second marriage, died 1951) was a British journalist and explorer. She is best known for her journey through China and Mongolia in the early twentieth century, which she wrote about in a 1920 book, A Tour in Mongolia.

== Biography ==
Bulstrode was born Mary Beatrix Nunns in 1869 in Sussex. She later became a journalist and was on the council of the Society of Women Journalists. In 1891, she married Herbert Timbrell Bulstrode, who died in 1911. Bulstrode wanted to travel after the death of her first husband.

Bulstrode toured Mongolia twice. The first journey used local guides and she was accompanied by a missionary from Finland. Her second trip was with Edward Manico Gull, whom she later married. On her travels, she carried a concealed Mauser C96 that she was practiced in using. She also had two Colt revolvers and a shotgun. The entire journey cost her $1,500.

Bulstrode began her journey in September 1911, starting out at Hong Kong. She took a boat to Fuzhow, where she was able to tour southern China. She took another boat trip to the mouth of the Yangzste River and then traveled 1,200 miles (1,900 kilometres) up the river part-way with a local crew and later on a British steamer. She next traveled near Yichang and then went back to Hankou. From there, she traveled to the capital, Beijing. From the capital, she traveled through Zhangjiakou in a cart to Mongolia. Once in Mongolia, she traveled 120 miles (190 kilometres) through open country, encountering Nomadic people. Bulstrode decided not to cross the Gobi Desert and returned to Beijing.

In Beijing, she met Edward Manico Gull who worked for customs in China. They decided to travel to northern Mongolia together and felt they each had complementary skills needed for the journey. They took a train to Verkhneudinsk in Siberia and then traveled up the Selenga River in a steamboat. They came to Kyakhta, where Russian customs held them up for some time because of their weapons and ammunition. Finally, they hired a three-horse cart known as a taranta, and began their journey to the capital of Mongolia, Ulaanbaatar. In the capital, she visited a "dungeon," where she described around 150 prisoners, most with life sentences being kept in small boxes, similar to coffins. She also related an incident where she watched the execution of three soldiers from this prison. Leaving the capital, they traveled by orton and reached Kyakhta. Then they went back to Siberia, took the Trans-Siberian Railway to St. Petersburg and finally returned to Britain.

Bulstrode published a book about her travels in 1920 called A Tour in Mongolia. She begins the stories of her travels in Beijing. The Washington Journal called A Tour in Mongolia a "vivid account" of her journey.

Bulstrode continued to stay involved with China, working to provide relief work in that country in 1937. Bulstrode died in 1951 in Surrey.

== Images ==
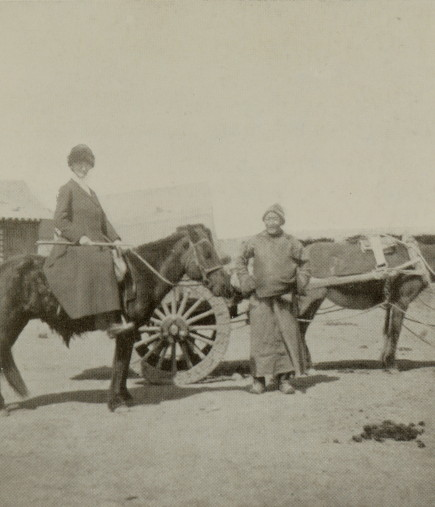
Beatrix ready to start her journey with Dobdun.

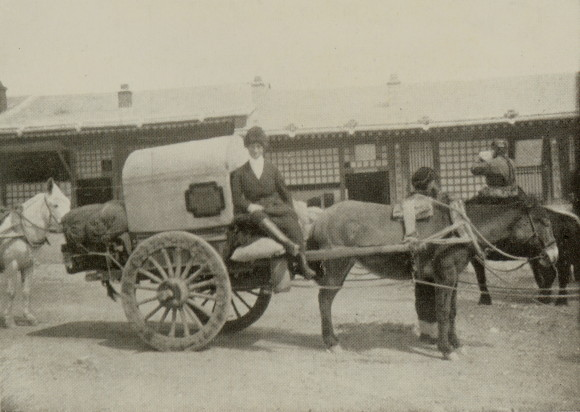
Bulstrode in a Peking Cart.
