= Whitelocke Bulstrode =

English official, religious controversialist and mystical writer

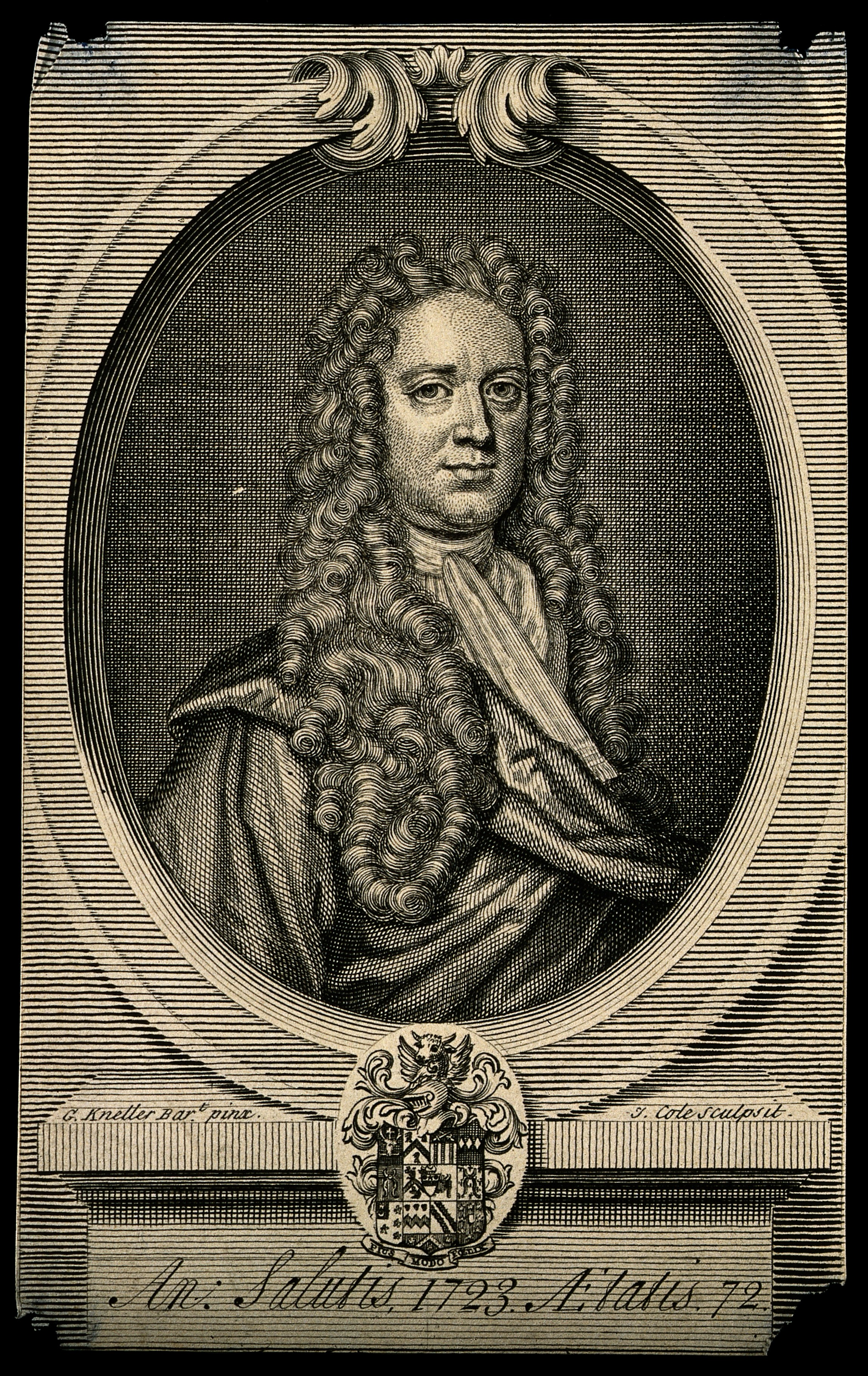
Whitelocke Bulstrode, after Kneller

Whitelocke Bulstrode (1650–1724) was an English official, religious controversialist and mystical writer.

== Life ==
He was the second son of Sir Richard Bulstrode and his wife Jocosa, daughter of Edward Dyneley of Charlton, Worcestershire. On 27 November 1661 he was specially admitted a student of the Inner Temple.

When his Jacobite father followed James II into exile, Bulstrode remained in England. He became prothonotary of the marshal's court and commissioner of excise. In 1705 he purchased the manor of Hounslow, Middlesex. He was chosen a justice of the peace for the county.

Bulstrode died at Hatton Garden on 27 November 1724. His tombstone at Hounslow gives his age as seventy-four. He was buried against the north wall of the chancel of the old priory chapel at Hounslow, but when this chapel was taken down the coffins of the family were removed to another vault, and the monument of Whitelocke Bulstrode was placed at the east end of the north gallery of the church.

== Works ==
Bulstrode's major work was A Discourse of Natural Philosophy, Wherein the Pythagorean Doctrine is set in its true light and vindicated (1692). The aim of the book was to distinguish the Pythagorean from the vulgar doctrine of transmigration, the only transmigration he contends for being that of the sensitive and vegetative spirit necessary to the production of life in the present world. A Latin translation of the book by Oswald Dyke was published in 1725, under the title Μετεμψύχωσις, sive Tentamen de Transmigratione in Pythagoræ Defensionem sen Naturalis Philosophiæ Discursus.

The character of the work led Dr. Wood, a Roman Catholic physician at the court of St, Germaine, married to Bulstrode's half-sister, to attempt his conversion to Roman Catholicism. Several letters passed privately between them on the subject, and Bulstrode, in the conviction that he had the best of the argument, published in 1717—several years afterwards—Letters between Dr. Wood, a Roman catholic, the Pretender's physician, and Whitelocke Bulstrode, Esq., a Member of the Church of England, touching the True Church, and whether there is Salvation out of the Roman Communion. A second edition appeared in 1718, under the title The Pillars of Popery thrown down, and the Principal Arguments of Roman Catholics answered and confuted; and in particular the specious plea for the Antiquity and Authority of the Church of Rome examined and overthrown.

Bulstrode was also the author of a volume of Essays on various Subjects (1724), moralistic and Puritanical in tone, published in 1724; and in 1715 he edited with a preface a volume of his father's essays. A Letter touching the late Rebellion and what means led to it, and of the Pretender's title: showing the duty and interest of all Protestants to be faithful to King George, and oppose the Pretender according to law and conscience (1717) was an anti-Jacobite pamphlet published under the pseudonym "Philalethes". He several times acted as chairman of Middlesex quarter sessions, and his charges to the grand jury and other juries in this capacity were printed in April and October 1718, and in October 1722. They were collected as A compendium of the crown laws, contained in three charges given by Whitelocke Bulstrode, esq. at Westminster (1723).

== Family ==
By his wife, Elizabeth, daughter and coheiress of Samuel Dyneley of Charlton, Worcestershire, Bulstrode left one son, Richard, who succeeded him as prothonotary, and two daughters.
