= Francis Gofton =

English courtier and administrator

Sir Francis Gofton (died 1628) was an English courtier and administrator. He was an auditor of royal accounts and jewels, Chief Auditor of the Imprest from 1597 and Auditor of Mint from August 1603. Gofton acquired the manor of Heathrow, and houses in Stockwell and West Ham. He was often called "Auditor Gofton". The surname is frequently transcribed as "Goston" or "Guston"

== Career ==
He was an Auditor of Imprests under John Conyers. In March 1595 he applied to William Cecil for help to gain an appointment as Receiver of Nottingham and Derby. It is not clear if he got that position, but he had letters patent in 1597 to "determine" accounts of all the queen's surveyors and works in England and Wales, the shipyards, chancery, and the wardrobe.

In January 1603 the auditor Richard Sutton complained that he had been continually sick on a previous official visit to Ireland with Gofton and begged to be excused.

Gofton played tennis with aristocrats, including the Earl of Rutland, a social activity which enhanced his career.

In December 1603 he consulted with Lord Buckhurst, the Lord Treasurer at West Horsley Place over plans for the garrison at Berwick-upon-Tweed. In January 1612 George Nicholson sent him accounts for Berwick noting that ten old pensioners and Sir William Selby had died.

In October 1604 he audited the accounts of Richard Mellersh, the former steward of the disgraced Lord Cobham and Frances Howard, Countess of Kildare. He delivered Cobham's "garter" and "George" jewels to Sir Edward Cary, Master of the King's Jewels and Plate, in March 1605.

The accounts for revels at court mention his involvement with ledgers and drawing up accounts from 1612 to 1623.

== Houses and a porpoise ==
Gofton had a house at West Ham on the outskirts of London where he had fishing rights, though he lodged in Red Cross street in the city. On 19 January 1606 a great porpoise was taken alive at West Ham, in a little creek, a mile and a half within the land, and this was presented to Francis Gofton. Gofton gave the porpoise to the Earl of Salisbury. This incident is often connected with a line in Ben Jonson's play, Volpone; "Were there three porpoises seen above the Bridge, As they give out?". Salisbury House being above London Bridge on the Thames.

Gofton sold lands and fishings on the Erne in Ireland to Sir Henry Folliot in April 1609, the former property of the Abbey of Assaroe near Ballyshannon.

He was knighted in February 1619 with other commissioners for the royal household and navy.

In December 1621 his house at Stockwell, near the house of the ambassador Noel Caron, burnt down and all his stuff was lost. As owner of this property he was known as "Francis Gofton of Stockwell". In his will, written in 1626, Gofton mentions that he had spent considerable sums on the Stockwell house, which belonged to his wife, before and after the fire. By this time his London house was in St Giles without Cripplegate. The lands at Stockwell manor had been bought by his wife's first husband, John Pyndar, in 1586.

== Jewels at the Union of the Crowns ==
In May 1603 Gofton was asked with Sir Edward Coke, Sir Thomas Gorges, and Sir Thomas Knyvett to make an inventory of the jewels of Queen Elizabeth in the keeping of Mrs Mary Radcliffe. They checked off items from an inventory made in July 1600. This inventory with their marginal notes is now held by the British Library and was published in 1988 by Janet Arnold.

Gofton made a list of 25 jewels which King James had given to Anne of Denmark from the crown jewels stored in the Tower of London. In December 1604 he sent a list of jewels the king had given the queen to the Earl of Suffolk and Viscount Cranborne. He noted particularly the Queen's gold crown weighing 53 ounces, kept by Sir Edward Cary.

Gofton was owed £400 for a jewel given to Anne Livingstone, Countess of Eglinton. Gofton made an inventory of the jewels of Arbella Stuart, taken on her ship in 1611. Gofton and Richard Sutton provided an overview of Prince Henry's expenses on building works after his death in 1612, summarising the account of his paymaster William Smith. In November 1614, Gofton was paid £20 for making a "fair book", an inventory of jewels in 1603, and subsequently updating it.

A note of the king's debts made in April 1616 includes £200 to Gofton for a chain of diamonds. After the death of Anne of Denmark and her funeral in May 1619 he and Sir Edward Coke inventoried her possessions at Denmark House and brought them to Greenwich Palace. Subsequently the queen's French page Piero Hugon and her servant Anna, "Dutch maide Anna", were arrested for stealing jewels.

== Silver pots in the Kremlin ==
King James VI gave two great water pots that Cornelis Hayes had made for Henry VIII to the Spanish ambassador Juan Fernández de Velasco y Tovar, 5th Duke of Frías, Constable of Castile, in 1604 at the Somerset House Conference Drawings were made of these treasures, and water pots made by William Jefferies in 1605 acquired by the Tsar, Michael of Russia, from Fabian Smith alias Ulyanov in 1629 may be replicas of Hayes' work. These pots are in the Kremlin Armoury Museum.

Some replicas of the silver plate given to the Spanish ambassadors and other diplomats were made in 1608 and Francis Gofton supervised the commission with instructions from the King and the Privy Council of England. Gofton's instructions allow some latitude in artistic design from the older silver, providing that the new pieces were "most fair and of best show, not so much regarding the preciseness of the patterns delivered" ... and not to "omit anything which, either in the curiousness of the workmanship or in the quantity of the pieces (though different from the patterns), might give any graceful ornament to them".

== Jewels for the Spanish match ==
On 2 March 1623 King James wanted Secretary Conway to visit the Tower of London with Lord Brooke, the Treasurer of the Household, the Chancellor of Exchequer, and George Heriot to select some "fine jewels fit for a woman", and others to be worn in hats. Some were for Prince Charles to give as presents in Spain, others were intended to be returned. The selection was to be sent to the king at Newmarket Palace. The jewels selected, including the king's hat badge of the letter "I" or "J" and others which had belonged to Anna of Denmark, were sent to Spain in March with Lord Carey of Leppington to Lord Compton, and in May with Sir Francis Stewart.

Gofton wrote to Secretary Conway about the plan of King Charles to sell jewels on 17 October 1625. He thought the best diamonds in the Tower of London had been sent to the king when he was at Canterbury and not returned, and the remainder in the Tower were "verie meane". He sent Conway an inventory including jewels returned from Spain, and contents of the "chest of late Queen Anne" which contained; a gold "flagon" bracelet; a jewel "in fashion of a Jesus" (the cipher of Jesus, "IHS"); 41 small diamonds from a jewel in the shape of a bay leaf; an old cross set with six diamonds of an old cut with four rubies and pearls; a gold chain, buttons, and aglets of "Spanish work" filled with white ambergris; a bodkin set with a diamond cut like a heart; a great ruby set in claws of gold, and other jewels and stones.

== Death ==
Francis Gofton died in 1628.

== Marriage and children ==
Francis Gofton married Katherine Kinsman (died 1634), the widow of John Pynder (died 1608), a vintner and member of Parliament. In her will, Katherine asked to be buried at the chapel of the Mercers’ Company near to John Pynder. Their children included:

- Francis Gofton (died 1642)
- John Gofton (1615-1686). His mother left him a house called Downhall in Barrow, Lincolnshire, and property in Stockwell including farms and the Old Orchard of the manor of Stockwell, with silver plate some formerly belonging to Roger Manners, 5th Earl of Rutland. He was buried at Lambeth.
