= Coronation of Anne Boleyn =

1533 coronation in England

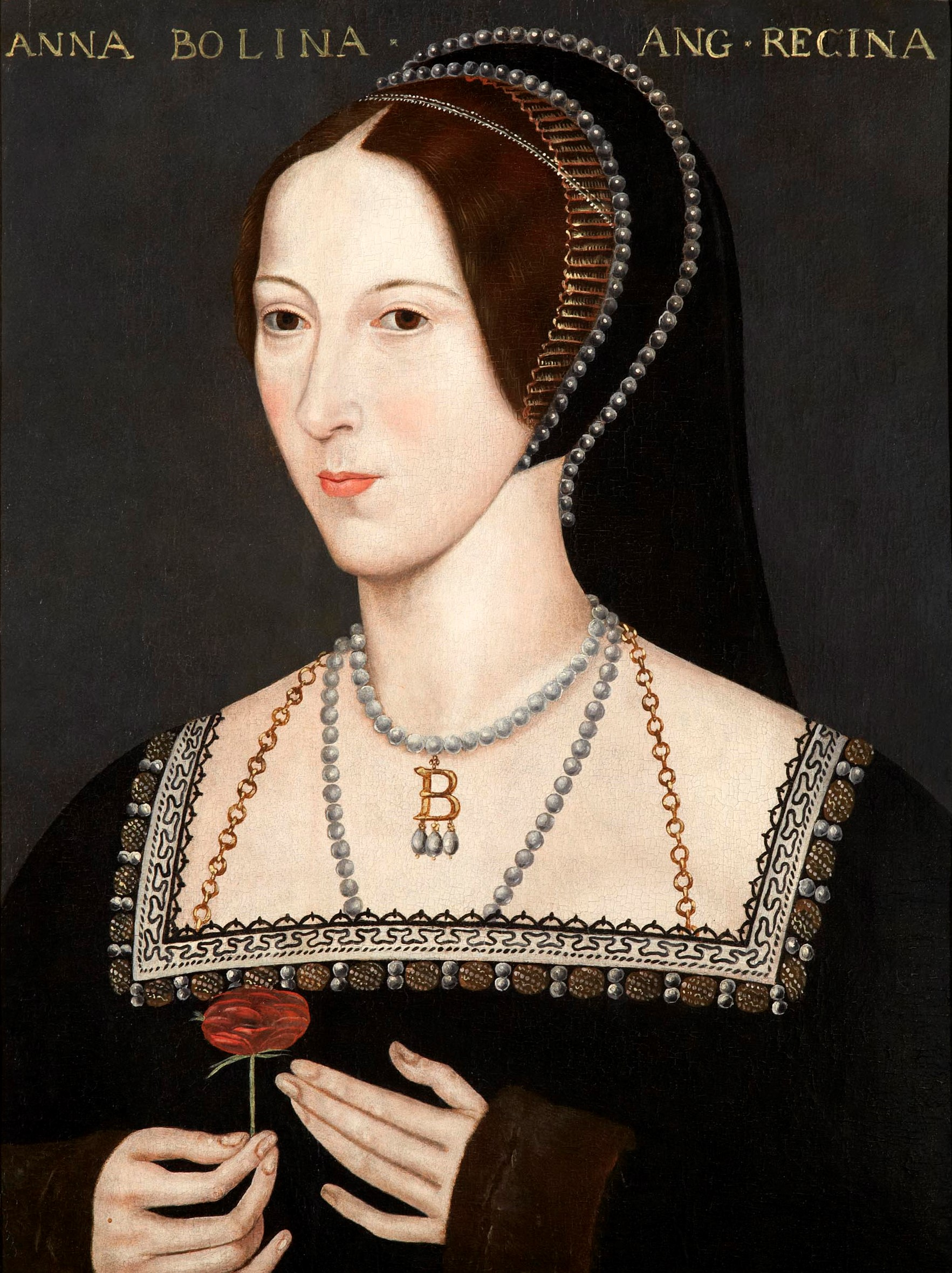
- posthumous portrait of Anne Boleyn Hever Castle, c. 1583
- Date: 1 June 1533
- Location: Westminster Abbey, London, England
- Participants: Queen Anne; The Archbishop of Canterbury; The Lord Great Chamberlain

The coronation of Anne Boleyn as Queen consort of England took place at Westminster Abbey, London, England, on 1 June 1533. The new queen was King Henry VIII's second wife, following the annulment of his first marriage to Catherine of Aragon.

The queen was visibly pregnant at the time of her coronation, and the usage of St Edward's Crown, which had been reserved for reigning monarchs, sought to legitimise Anne as the new queen, along with her unborn child, which was expected to be the long-awaited male heir. The coronation was preceded by an elaborate procession, which had started the day before at the Tower of London. Although the celebrations for the coronation were lavish, the general populace did not receive her well, as clearly demonstrated in contemporary accounts.

== Background ==
After over two decades of marriage to Catherine of Aragon, King Henry VIII still had no male heir: his only legitimate child was Princess Mary. Desperate to secure the Tudor dynasty, Henry sought to have his marriage annulled on the grounds that Catherine had previously been married to Prince Arthur, Henry's deceased older brother. Further motivation seems to have come from his relationship with Anne Boleyn, a lady-in-waiting to Queen Catherine. Pope Clement VII refused his request, probably under pressure from Catherine's nephew, Emperor Charles V, who was holding Clement prisoner. Faced with this, Henry split England from the Catholic Church, beginning the English Reformation.

As the new Supreme Head of the Church of England, the king now had the authority to end his own marriage, which he promptly did. Catherine was stripped of her title as queen consort on 23 May 1533 by Thomas Cranmer, the new Archbishop of Canterbury, who five days later, declared the validity of Henry's marriage to Anne, which had secretly been performed in Dover. Cranmer wrote that Anne was married "aboute sainte Paules day last" and at her coronation was "nowe sumwhat bygg with chylde".

== Procession and pageant ==
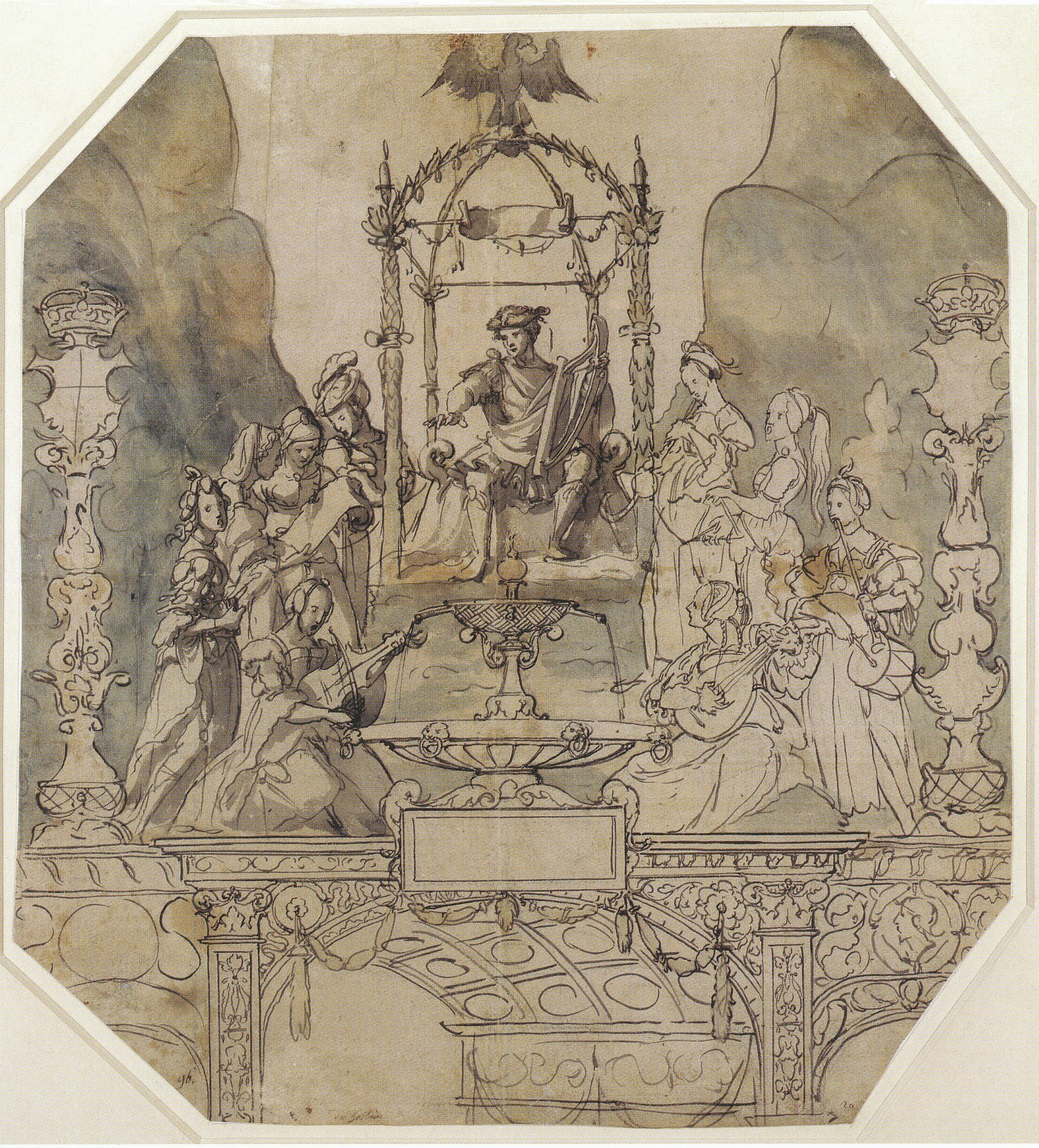
Design by Holbein for a coronation pageant of Apollo and the Muses

The first pageant for the new queen took place on 29 May, on the River Thames, while Anne was rowed from Greenwich to the Tower of London. Another boat on the river fired salutes, and an artificial dragon spouted wild fire, and another boat carried a pageant of a mount with maiden musicians, featuring Anne's falcon badge. The imperial ambassador Eustache Chapuys reported that Anne's barge had been seized from Catherine of Aragon. During the pageants and coronation, Henry VIII seems to have given Anne a prominent position, and kept himself in the background. When she was on the river, he "came always before her secretly in a barge", and a sketch plan for the banquet in Westminster Hall shows Anne Boleyn seated under a canopy, while Henry was in a closet nearby. Even his presence in the Abbey during the service is uncertain.

Before the coronation itself, on 31 May 1533, there was a triumphant coronation procession or Royal Entry from the Tower of London to Westminster Hall in anticipation of the queen's coronation. The event was intended to begin at two in the afternoon, but ended up taking place three hours late. The spectacle was not only an affirmation that Anne was the legitimate queen as wife of the King, but also that she was pregnant with the heir to the throne of England. Anne Boleyn was carried in a litter draped with white cloth of gold, her hair was worn loose like a bride's. The procession travelled through major streets of the city; along the way, Anne was entertained with sumptuous displays. According to a contemporary pamphlet, the Lord Mayor of London and his entourage then received the queen. The procession then travelled to the northwest of the Tower, soon arriving at Fenchurch Street, where she was greeted with a pageant consisting of children dressed as English and French merchants.

Anne is likely to have passed through Tower Hill, where three years later, her brother and alleged lovers would be executed. Moving down the street, Anne observed a costly and spectacular pageant, sponsored by the merchants of the Steelyard and designed by Holbein. It featured the Greek god Apollo, surrounded by the Muses, who gave gifts to the queen. Continuing down Gracechurch Street, the procession halted at Leadenhall Street for another spectacle: a castle, with a rose at the top with red and white roses that sprang forth, from which a falcon which landed on a stump. An angel wearing armour descended and crowned the falcon, clearly referencing Anne's badge. The coronation procession continued with plenty of sights and intricate displays for the queen, and the initials "HA" interlaced with a knot were painted everywhere.

== Coronation ==
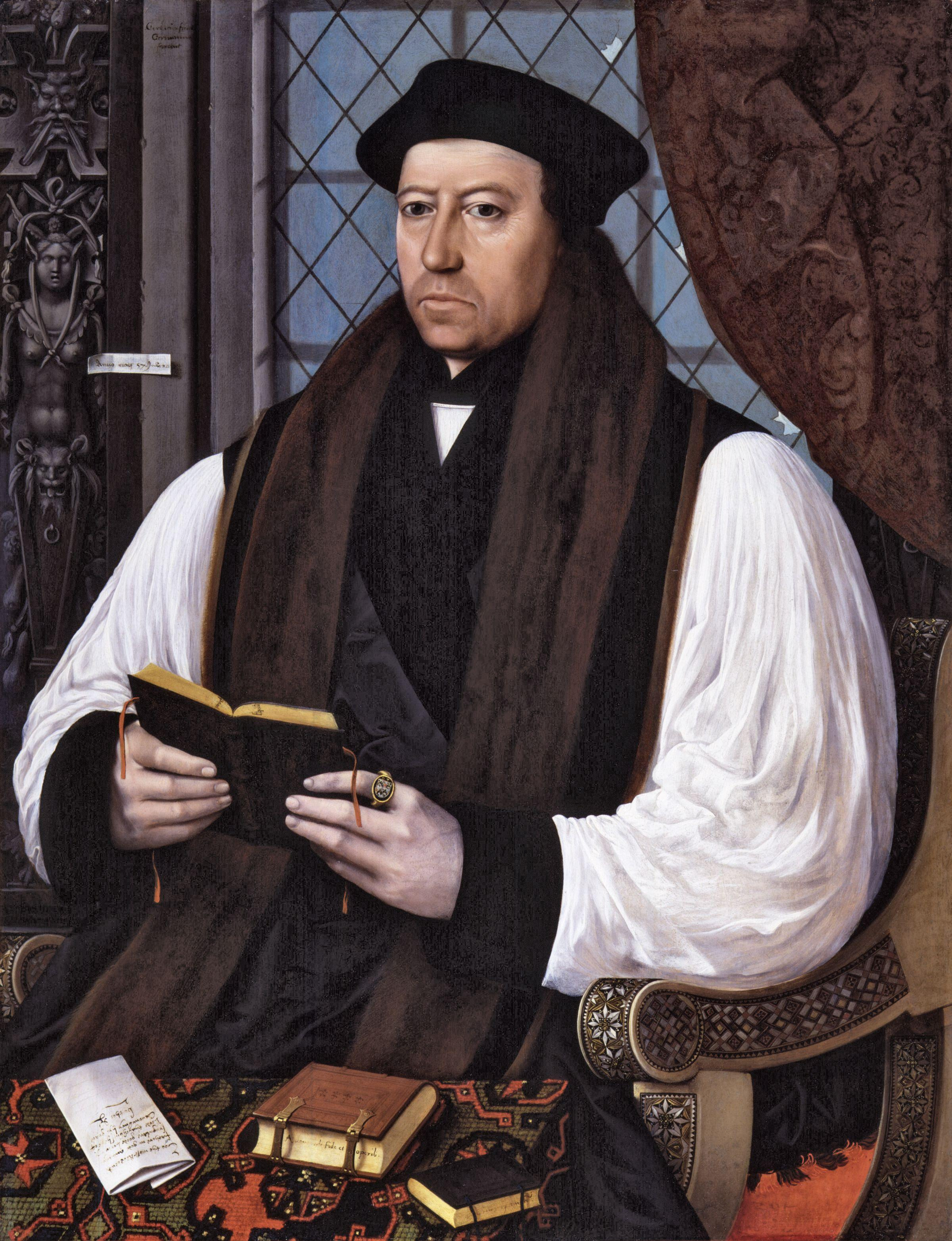
Thomas Cranmer, Archbishop of Canterbury

On 1 June 1533, Anne was led from the Palace of Westminster, where she had spent the night, to Westminster Abbey for her coronation. The Lord Mayor and aldermen, dressed in crimson velvet, were to receive Anne in Westminster Hall before eight in the morning. The queen herself appeared an hour later, dressed in robes of purple velvet and ermine fur. Her hair was free-flowing, and she wore a circlet made of gold and gems. Anne stood in the hall with the clergy, religious and men of the King's Chapel.

After the procession of the lesser nobles, the Marquess of Dorset and the Earl of Arundel followed, carrying the sceptre and the rod of ivory. Then came the Earl of Oxford, carrying the crown, followed by the Lord High Steward, the Earl Marshal's deputy and then the queen walking barefoot. Her canopy was carried by four of the Lords of the Cinque Ports. Her robe was held up by the Bishops of London and Winchester, and the train by the Dowager Duchess of Norfolk. Anne then rested for a short while on a chair, after which she prostrated in front of the altar, a difficult task for a woman well into her pregnancy. She stood up, and was then anointed and crowned Queen of England by Archbishop Cranmer with St Edward's Crown. She was then handed the rod and the sceptre in her left and right hands respectively. The Queen's sceptre with a dove had been refurbished by Cornelis Hayes in May.

A Te Deum was sung and the crown was then swapped for a lighter one made specifically for the queen, following which mass was held, with Anne receiving the sacrament and making offerings at Saint Edward the Confessor's shrine.

Anne then retired for a brief rest, after which the procession returned to Westminster Hall with the newly crowned queen supported by her father and Lord Talbot. Upon her return to the palace, she rested again while the celebratory feast was prepared.

== Sources ==
- Williams, Neville (1971). Henry VIII and His Court. Macmillan Pub Co. ISBN 978-0-02-629100-2.
- Lehman, H. Eugene (2011). Lives of England's Reigning and Consort Queens. AuthorHouse Publishing. ISBN 978-1-4634-3057-3.
- Ridgway, Claire (31 May 2011). "31 May 1533 – Anne Boleyn's Coronation Procession". The Anne Boleyn Files.
- Ridgway, Claire (June 2015). "1st June 1533 – The noble triumphant coronation of Queen Anne Boleyn". The Anne Boleyn Files.
- Warnicke, Retha M. (1991). The Rise and Fall of Anne Boleyn. Cambridge University Press. ISBN 9780521406772.
- The noble tryumphaunt coronacyon of quene Anne wyfe vnto the moost noble kynge Henry the .viij. 1533.
- Benger, Elizabeth (1827). Memoirs of the Life of Anne Boleyn, Queen of Henry VIII. Longmans, Rees, Orme, Brown, and Green. p. 445.
- Friedmann, Paul (1884). Anne Boleyn: a chapter of English history, 1527-1536. Books on Demand. ISBN 9780598566720.
