= Edward Bulstrode =

English judge

Edward Bulstrode (1588–1659), lawyer, the second son of Edward Bulstrode of Hedgeley, near Beaconsfield, Buckinghamshire, by Cecilia, daughter of Sir John Croke of Chilton, was born in 1588. He became a commoner of St. John's College, Oxford in 1603, but left it without a degree. He entered the Inner Temple on 26 January 1605, was called to the bar on 13 January 1613, and became a bencher on 23 November 1629. On 4 November 1632 he became Lent reader of his inn, and in the time of the rebellion he was, by the favour of his nephew, Bulstrode Whitelock, made one of the justices of North Wales in 1649. He was also employed as an itinerant justice, particularly in Warwickshire, in 1653, where he had an estate at Astley. He died in or near the Inner Temple about the beginning of April 1659, and on the 4th of that month was buried in the body of the church on the south side of the pulpit, he being then one of the masters of the bench. He was the author of "A Golden Chain; or, a Miscellany of diverse Sentences of the Sacred Scriptures, and of other Authors collected and linked together for the Soul’s Comfort" (1657); and is well known for his "Reports of divers Resolutions and Judgments", in three parts, 1657, 1658, and 1659, the whole reprinted with many new references in 1688, not 1691, as is stated by Wood.
