= Cold Norton =

Village in Essex, England

Coordinates: 51.672236°N 0.668964°E

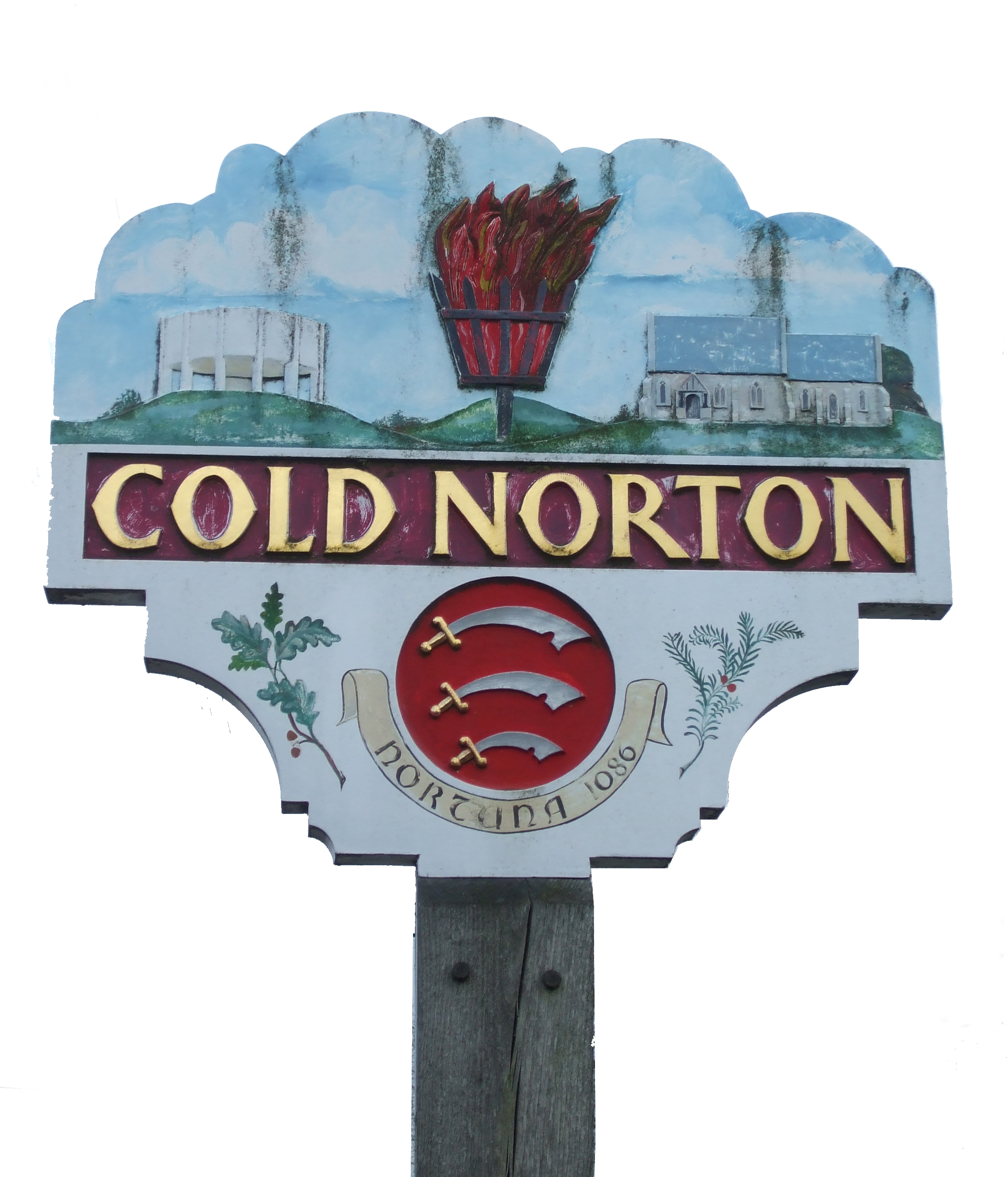
- Village sign

- Location within Essex
- Population: 1,162 (Parish, 2021)
- OS grid reference: TL845005
- District: Maldon
- Shire county: Essex
- Region: East
- Country: England
- Sovereign state: United Kingdom
- Post town: Chelmsford
- Postcode district: CM3
- Dialling code: 01621
- Police: Essex
- Fire: Essex
- Ambulance: East of England
- UK Parliament: Maldon

Cold Norton is a village on the Dengie Peninsula in Essex, England. It is located in rural countryside 10 miles to the east of Chelmsford, and lies just over a mile to the north of the River Crouch, which can be seen from the village's main hill. Nearby villages include Purleigh and North Fambridge. Administratively, Cold Norton forms part of the Purleigh ward in the Maldon District. At the 2021 census the parish had a population of 1,162.

The parish includes some industrial and commercial enterprises and the Three Rivers Golf and Country Club.

There are two golf courses at Three Rivers Golf and Country Club, The 18 hole 6449 yard par 72 Kings Course and the smaller 18 hole par 64 Jubilee Course.

Cold Norton Primary School is in St Stephens Road.

The local parish church, St Stephen's, was the location of the first Church of England marriage ceremony to be conducted by a woman priest.

The Stow Maries Aerodrome is situated within Cold Norton. It is a grade II listed World War I aerodrome built to defend London from zeppelin attack. 24 buildings remain standing, which have been sympathetically restored.

The Norton Public House was reopened in August 2009 being run on a voluntary basis by local residents with the cooperation of the owners of the freehold. It was featured in the television series Save our Boozer shown on UKTV Blighty.

The village hall has secured £348,500 from the Big Lottery Fund. The money comes from the lottery fund's community buildings programme.
