= Stockdale =

Stockdale is a surname originating from Northern England, probably Yorkshire. At the time of the British Census of 1881, its frequency was highest in Yorkshire, followed by Westmorland, Cumberland, County Durham, Nottinghamshire, Cambridgeshire, Lincolnshire, Rutland, and Lancashire.

The family name has several different spellings that have appeared historically. Some of those variations are Stocksdale, Stogdel, Stogsdill, Stockdel, Stogdill, Stoxdale, and Stockstill.

== People ==
- Alan Stockdale (born 1945), Australian politician
- Alexander Stockdale (1509–1563), English politician and Yorkshire landowner
- Andrew Stockdale (born 1976), lead singer of Australian band Wolfmother
- Sir Arthur Stockdale Cope (1857–1940), English painter
- Carl Stockdale (1874–1953), American actor
- Christopher Walters Stockdale (1665–1713), English parliamentarian and landowner
- Christopher Stockdale (born 1965), English cricketer
- David Stockdale (born 1985), English footballer
- Sir Edmund Stockdale (1903–1989), Lord Mayor of London, 1st Stockdale baronet
- Fletcher Stockdale (c. 1823–1890), American politician from Texas
- Sir Frank Arthur Stockdale (1883–1949), English agriculturist
- Freddie Stockdale (1947–2018), British opera impresario, founder of Pavilion Opera
- Frederick Wilton Litchfield Stockdale (1786–1858), British artist
- Geoff Stockdale (born 1944), British speed skater
- Grant Stockdale (1915–1963), United States Ambassador to Ireland
- Greg Stockdale (1899–1949), Australian rules footballer
- Henrietta Stockdale (1847–1911), British nursing pioneer
- Herbert F. Stockdale (1865–1951), British academic administrator
- Jacob Stockdale (born 1996), Irish rugby player
- Jacqui Stockdale (born 1968), Australian contemporary artist
- James Stockdale (1923–2005), United States Navy admiral, Vice-Presidential candidate
- John Stockdale Hardy (1793–1849) English antiquarian
- John Stockdale (1750–1814), English publisher
  - John Joseph Stockdale (1770–1847), publisher, son of John Stockdale
  - Mary Stockdale (1774–1854), writer and publisher, daughter of John Stockdale
- Joseph Stockdale (1754–1803), first editor and printer of The Bermuda Gazette
- Mark Stockdale (born 1968) Australian rules footballer
- Sir Noel Stockdale (1920–2004), English businessman, co-founded Asda
- Percival Stockdale (1736–1811), anti-slavery English poet
- Reginald Booth Stockdale (1908–1979), English Colonel Commandant of the Royal Electrical and Mechanical Engineers
- Robbie Stockdale (born 1979), English footballer
- Stuart Stockdale, English fashion designer, former head of design at Pringle of Scotland
- Sue Stockdale (born 1966), British polar adventurer
- Susan Stockdale, England international and world champion bridge player
- Sybil Stockdale (1924–2015), co-founder and National Coordinator of the National League of Families
- Thomas Stockdale (disambiguation) multiple people
- Sir Thomas Minshull Stockdale (1940–2021), English barrister, 2nd Stockdale baronet
- Tim Stockdale (1964–2018), English equestrian
- Valentine Stockdale (born 1981), English film producer
- William Stockdale (1634–1693), English parliamentarian and landowner

=== Titles ===
- Stockdale baronets, a title in the Baronetage of the United Kingdom

=== Fictional people ===
- Barney Stockdale, a character in a Sherlock Holmes short story
- No Time for Sergeants, various concerning Private Will Stockdale
  - No Time for Sergeants, a 1954 best-selling novel by Mac Hyman
  - No Time for Sergeants, a 1958 film starring Andy Griffith

== Places ==
=== United States ===
- Stockdale, Indiana
- Stockdale, Missouri
- Stockdale, Ohio
- Stockdale, Pennsylvania
- Stockdale, Texas
- Stockdale High School (disambiguation), multiple schools
- Stockdale Mill, on the National Register of Historic Places
- Stockdale neighborhood, a neighborhood in South Bakersfield, California

=== United Kingdom ===
- Stockdale Shales, a Silurian period geological formation in England
  - Stockdale Group, another name for the above
- Stockdalewath, Cumbria

== Other ==
- USS Stockdale, several ships
- Stockdale v Hansard, an 1839 decision of the United Kingdom court regarding the common law of parliamentary privilege
- Vice Admiral James Bond Stockdale Award for Inspirational Leadership, U.S. naval award for inspirational leadership
- Stockdale paradox, named after U.S. Navy vice-admiral James Stockdale

== See also ==
- Stocksdale, a surname
