= Stocksdale =

Stocksdale is an English surname; see Stockdale for additional information.

== Spelling Variations ==
The family name has several different spellings that have appeared historically. Some of those variations are Stockdale, Stogdel, Stogsdill, Stockdel, Stogdill, Stoxdale, and Stockstill.

== People ==
- Bob Stocksdale (1913–2003), American woodturner
- Nancy R. Stocksdale (born 1934), American politician
- Otis Stocksdale (1871–1933), American baseball player and coach
- Vaughn Stocksdale (1939-2016), American politician
