= Halderman–Van Buskirk Farmstead =

- U.S. National Register of Historic Places
- U.S. Historic district
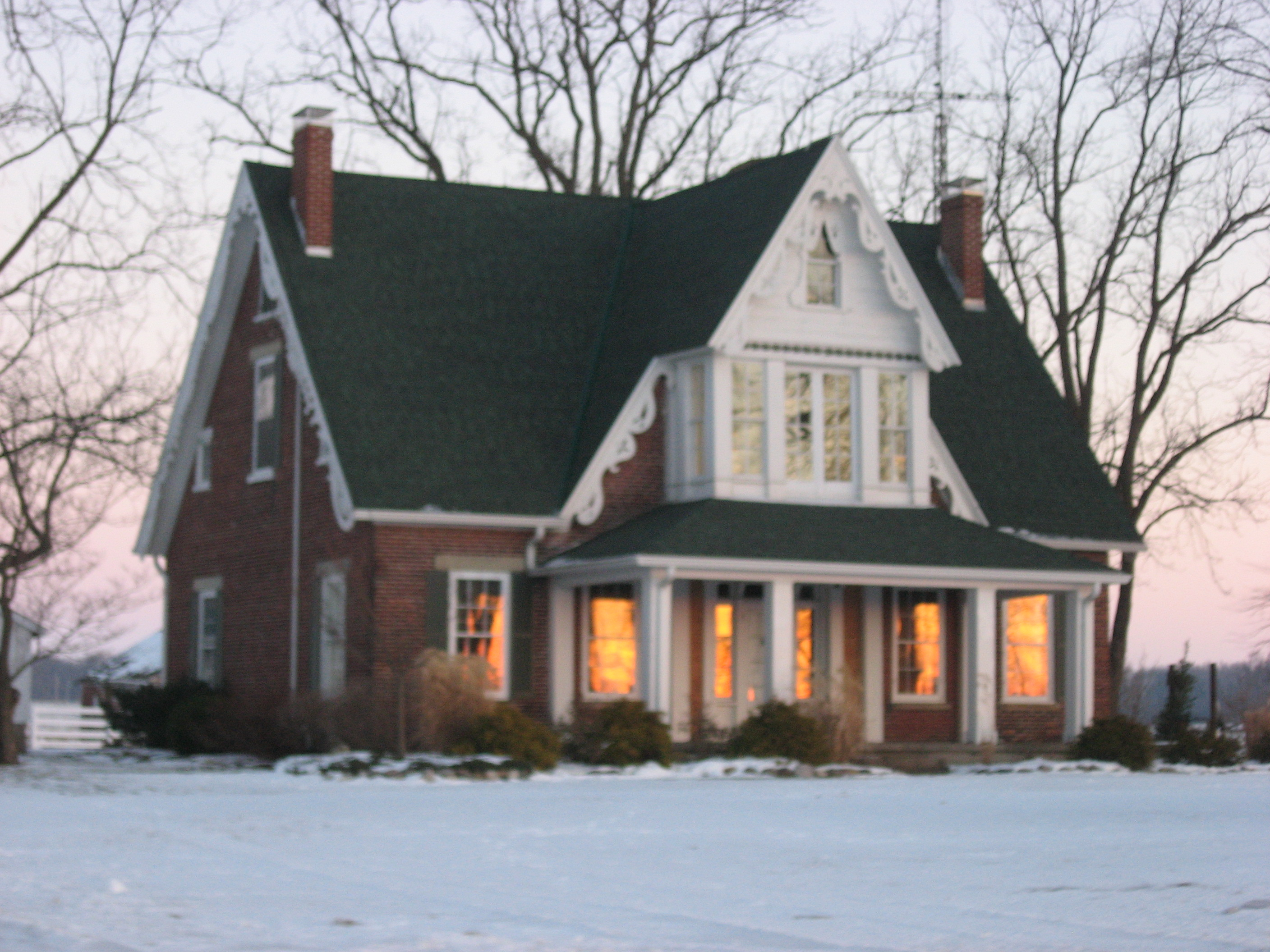
- Halderman–Van Buskirk Farmhouse, January 2013

- Location within Indiana Location within the United States
- Location: 5653 N700W, south of Roann in Paw Paw Township, Wabash County, Indiana
- Coordinates: 40°54′22″N 85°55′26″W
- Area: 2 acres (0.81 ha)
- Architectural style: Gothic Revival
- NRHP reference No.: 13000092
- Added to NRHP: March 20, 2013

Halderman–Van Buskirk Farmstead is a historic farm and national historic district located in Paw Paw Township, Wabash County, Indiana. It encompasses five contributing buildings, one contributing site, and four contributing structure on a farm established in 1860. The farmhouse was built between 1860 and 1865, and is a 1 1/2-story, Gothic Revival style brick dwelling on a fieldstone foundation. Other contributing resources are the milk house (c. 1920), carriage house (c. 1920), dairy barn (c. 1870), livestock barn (c. 1865), corn crib (c. 1865), grain bin (c. 1930), cistern (c. 1875), and grain silo (1941).

It was listed on the National Register of Historic Places in 2013.
