= Audient =

British audio equipment manufacturer

Audient Ltd.
- Company type: Private
- Industry: Mixing consoles Studio hardware
- Founded: 1997; 29 years ago
- Headquarters: Herriard, Hampshire, UK
- Products: iD Audio Interface Range; EVO Audio Interface Range ASP8024HE Analogue Recording Console; ASP4816-HE Analogue Recording Console
- Number of employees: 30+
- Website: www.audient.com

Audient Ltd. is a British company based in Herriard, Hampshire, England that designs, manufactures, and markets mixing consoles, audio interfaces, microphone preamplifiers, monitor controllers and signal processors.

== History ==
=== Background ===
Audient was founded by David Dearden and Gareth Davies. Dearden started his recording career in 1968, moving to London two years later to work as a junior maintenance engineer at Advision Studios and later led the design of two Quad Eight consoles for the studio, one which was the first automated console in England. Dearden also worked with studio designer Eddie Veale, building a custom mixing console for John Lennon's private Ascot Sound Studios, as well as consoles for George Harrison, Ringo Starr, Gus Dudgeon, and Chris Squire.

Dearden met Gareth Davies while working at Soundcraft, and the two partnered in 1980 to co-found DDA (Dearden-Davies Associates) – a company known for designing mixing console in the 1980s and 1990s. After Klark Teknik's acquisition of DDA in 1986 and Midas the following year, Dearden designed the Midas XL200 and the initial concept of the Midas H1000.

=== Company ===
Audient was co-founded by Dearden and Davies in 1997. The company is based in Herriard (near Basingstoke, Hampshire, England), with employees in Bulgaria and throughout the UK. A widespread global distribution network is in place outside of the United Kingdom, with Audient taking British distribution in-house as of July 2010.

In 2013, Audient was purchased by Simon Blackwood.

In 2021, the company rebranded with a website redesign and new logo.

== Products ==
=== Mixing consoles ===
Audient's initial and flagship product is the ASP8024 large-format analog in-line recording console, originally introduced in 1998. An acronym for analogue signal processing, ASP Series consoles are built-to-order and fully customizable, available in configurations up to 60 channels, all with Class-A microphone preamplifiers, 2-band parametric equalizer with high and low shelving filter, and integrated patchbay, with available options including automation and DAW control. The company introduced a smaller, compact version of the console, the ASP4816, in 2012. In 2016, Audient updated the ASP8024 to the "Heritage Edition", with various internal design upgrades, as well as vintage-style cosmetic updates. In 2022 Audient introduced the smaller ASP4816 "Heritage Edition", with similar design upgrades to ASP8024HE as well as giving the original ASP4816 a makeover.

=== Preamps and processors ===
In 2006, Audient introduced the ASP008, which packaged 8-channels of the company's microphone preamplifiers in a 1U rackmountable chassis. A 2-channel version, the Mico, was introduced in 2009. In 2014 the company introduced the ASP880 as a replacement to the ASP008, adding the ASP800 to their preamplifier offerings the following year.

In 2008, Audient introduced the Black Series modular signal processing system, with available preamplifier, equalizer, compressor, AD converter, and master clock modules, along with a frame capable of housing, powering, and providing connectivity to up to 10 modules.

In 2023 the EVO SP8 8-channel Smart Preamp was added to the EVO range.

=== Audio interfaces ===
In 2013, Audient entered the audio interface market with the first iD Series interface, the iD22, introducing the iD14 the following year, the iD4 in 2016, and iD44 in 2019. In 2021 the second generation iD4 MKII and iD14 MKII were introduced, followed by iD44 MKII in 2022 and iD24 in 2023.

In 2019 Audient released the guitar-centric Sono in collaboration with Two notes.

In 2020, the company introduced the EVO Series audio interfaces, including the EVO 4 and EVO 8. The EVO Start Recording Bundle including EVO 4, headphones and microphone came out in 2021. In 2022 the EVO 16 audio interface was released.

=== Monitor controllers ===
Audient released ASP510 surround sound monitor controller in 2001. In 2019 Audient introduced Nero desktop monitor controller.

== Notable users ==
Audient equipment is in use at many major studios worldwide, such as Abbey Road Studios, Pete Townshend's Eel Pie Studios and House of Blues, USA. Audient gear can also be found at producer/audio engineer Cenzo Townshend's Decoy Studios, Nicholas Lloyd Webber's central London studio and Romesh Dodangoda's Long Wave in Cardiff. Mark Crew and Charlie Simpson (Busted, Fightstar) both own Audient consoles. Other users include sound engineer, Damien Lewis, Skunk Anansie rock singer SKIN, TV choirmaster Gareth Malone, film composer Kurt Oldman, and producer Warren Huart

Educational facilities with Audient consoles installed in their music production studios include Liverpool Institute of Performing Arts (LIPA), Institute of Contemporary Music (ICMP), University of West London, Royal High School in Bath and ACM.
