= Southrope =

Hamlet in Hampshire, England

Coordinates: 51.2000°N 1.0333°W

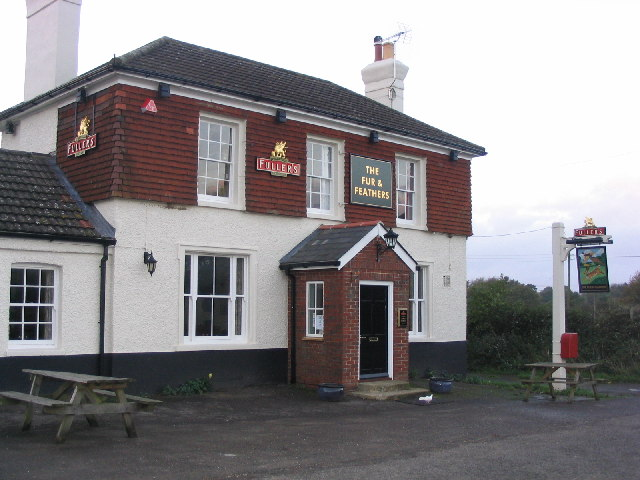
- The Fur and Feathers, Southrope

- Location within Hampshire
- OS grid reference: SU6763644975
- Civil parish: Herriard
- District: Basingstoke and Deane
- Shire county: Hampshire
- Region: South East
- Country: England
- Sovereign state: United Kingdom
- Post town: ALTON
- Postcode district: GU34
- Dialling code: 01420
- Police: Hampshire and Isle of Wight
- Fire: Hampshire and Isle of Wight
- Ambulance: South Central

Southrope is a hamlet in the civil parish of Herriard, Hampshire. It has one pub, named the Fur and Feathers. The hamlet was once considered a part of the civil parish Bentworth, until the late 19th century. Its nearest town is Alton, which lies approximately 5.8 miles (9.3 km) south-east from the hamlet. The hamlet's toponym derives from Old English Sūþrop, meaning south village.

== Governance ==
The hamlet is part of the civil parish of Herriard and is part of the Upton Grey and the Candovers ward of Basingstoke and Deane borough council. The borough council is a Non-metropolitan district of Hampshire County Council. At one time, Southrope came under the large parish of Bentworth until its decline in the mid-19th century. Although today, Herriard's parish borders the parish of Bentworth.
