= Valentine Stockdale =

English film producer, screenwriter and executive producer

Valentine Stockdale (born 15 December 1981) is an English film producer, screenwriter and executive producer.

== Early life ==
He was born in London, and raised in the English counties of Northumberland, Northamptonshire, Sussex and Lincolnshire. He became a member of Mensa International aged 12 and was educated at Eton College specializing in graphic design, physics and mathematics.

== Screenwriting ==
His commissioned feature screenplays to date include 'The Good War' scheduled for production in Malta in 2010 starring Alfred Molina, Ed Speleers and Ian Virgo; 'Brodie's Law' the gruesome graphic novel adaptation from infamous comic book publisher Pulp Theatre; and a comedy musical studio picture from Firefly. He currently has several further screenplays in development through Vesuvius Film Partners including a Russian espionage thriller studio picture, an Argentine political thriller and a horror movie. Most recently his screenplay 'Gabriel-Ernest' was the Winner of five accolades including Winner at the A Night of Horror International Film Festival 2011, a Semi-Finalist in the PAGE International Screenwriting Awards, and a Finalist in the European Independent Film Festival 2010.

== Film producer ==
He began his early days in film as an Assistant Director and Production Manager after many years working on commercials and music videos for the multi-award-winning UK production companies Rose Hackney Barber, Bliss Films, Great Guns, Oil Factory, Wall2Wall, Own2Feet & Godman. In 2007 he joined new media group Universal 360 as an Executive Producer and began developing and producing feature films and television programs for leading UK independent Firefly. He also served for 10 months as an Executive Producer at London-based music TV production company Oberon.

In 2008 he founded London based film finance company Vesuvius Film Partners, providing finance for feature-length independent and studio motion pictures including consultancy services, medium to high budget fundraising services, seed capital, bridge loans, mezzanine finance, GAP finance, and the structuring of commercial transactions and investments through tax incentive schemes. In early 2009 he became Head of Acquisitions and Co-productions at Firefly. In mid-2009 Stockdale left Firefly to concentrate full-time on motion picture finance, joining Capital Motion Pictures, a fund of funds providing match finance to major Hollywood studios. Stockdale also serves as a freelance adviser and Executive Producer at 8 times BAFTA nominated, 3 times BAFTA winning Aquarium Studios based in London.

== Films ==
Most notably he is Executive Producer of Boogie Woogie starring Heather Graham, Danny Huston, Christopher Lee, Amanda Seyfried, Gillian Anderson, Stellan Skarsgård, Joanna Lumley, Simon McBurney, Charlotte Rampling, Jamie Winstone and Alan Cumming, a black comedy about the British art industry directed by Duncan Ward and the first motion picture featuring the work of infamous curator Damien Hirst. The film was released in March 2010 by Vertigo Films and IFC.

He is also Executive Producer of Lionsgate's Jack Falls, the final installment of the first ever British film trilogy, particularly reminiscent of the Robert Rodriguez classic Sin City; and King Kennedy, a feature-length drama/thriller set in the 1960s made entirely from archive material. The film stars some of the most prominent characters from 1960's America, including US President John F. Kennedy, Robert F. Kennedy, civil rights movement leader Martin Luther King Jr., convicted assassins Lee Harvey Oswald and Sirhan Sirhan, and the film world icons Marilyn Monroe and Frank Sinatra. The plot line revolves around the concepts of truth and freedom, but pursues further towards deception, intrigue, conspiracy and murder, and features some of the most memorable moments in 1960's America, including Marilyn Monroe's world-famous "Happy Birthday, Mr. President" at Madison Square Garden and King's 1963 "I Have A Dream" speech, at the March on Washington for Jobs and Freedom, in which he called for racial equality and an end to discrimination. The film is designed primarily to remind, focusing on the characters and events that build up to the assassination of John F. Kennedy, assassination of Martin Luther King Jr., and the assassination of Robert F. Kennedy, as their apparent determination to shy away from war, discrimination and hatred became ever more publicized.

== Media consulting ==
In addition to his producing work, Valentine has served as a senior consultant at Mayfair-based investment and corporate advisory firm Buchler Rothschild Investments, providing corporate strategy, fundraising and business advisory services to clients in the media arena. Valentine is also a partner at corporate finance and commodities trading organization HSW Finance, providing financial instruments and fundraising services to clients in the international commodities trading industries.

== Family ==
He is the first cousin of George Roy Hill, Academy Award-winning director of Butch Cassidy and the Sundance Kid and The Sting and the grandson of Sir Edmund Stockdale and The Hon. Louise Fermor-Hesketh.

== Filmography ==
Film & Television
Year	Film	Position	Director	Cast
2002	The Willy De Ville Concerts (Live)	Production Manager	Perry Joseph	Willy DeVille
2002	The Day Britain Stopped	Assistant Director	Gabriel Range	Tim Pigott-Smith
2003	Winter Solstice	Assistant Director	Martyn Friend	Jean Simmons, Geraldine Chaplin, Sinéad Cusack
2005	New Town Original	Production Manager	Jason Ford	Elliott Jordan, JC Mac
2005	Testament Concerts (Live)	Executive Producer	Perry Joseph	Testament
2006	The Dealer	production assistant	Tony Royden	John Thomson, Craig Charles, Dave Legeno, Patrick Murray, Ricky Grover.
2007	XFM 10th Anniversary (Live)	Executive Producer	Guy Moore	Foo Fighters, White Stripes, Kaiser Chiefs, The Kooks, Razorlight, Klaxons, Kate Nash.
2008	The Eden Project (Live)	Executive Producer	Guy Moore	Kaiser Chiefs, The Verve
2009	The Good War	Screenwriter	Guido Chiesa	Alfred Molina, Ed Speleers, Ian Virgo
2010	Boogie Woogie	Executive Producer	Duncan Ward	Amanda Seyfried, Heather Graham, Gillian Anderson, Danny Huston, Christopher Lee, Alan Cumming
2010	The Last Seven	Executive Producer	Imran Naqvi	Danny Dyer, Tamer Hassan, Ronan Vibert |
2010	King Kennedy	Executive Producer	Ronan O'Rahilly	John F. Kennedy, Robert F. Kennedy, Martin Luther King Jr., Frank Sinatra, Marilyn Monroe
2010	Men Don't Lie	Producer, Executive Producer	Jane Spencer	Michael Madsen, Jean-Hugues Anglade, Ed Speleers
2010	Jack Falls	Executive Producer	Paul Tanter	Jason Flemyng, Tamer Hassan, Alan Ford, Dexter Fletcher, Martin Kemp, Adam Deacon
