= Stockdale Mill =

- U.S. National Register of Historic Places
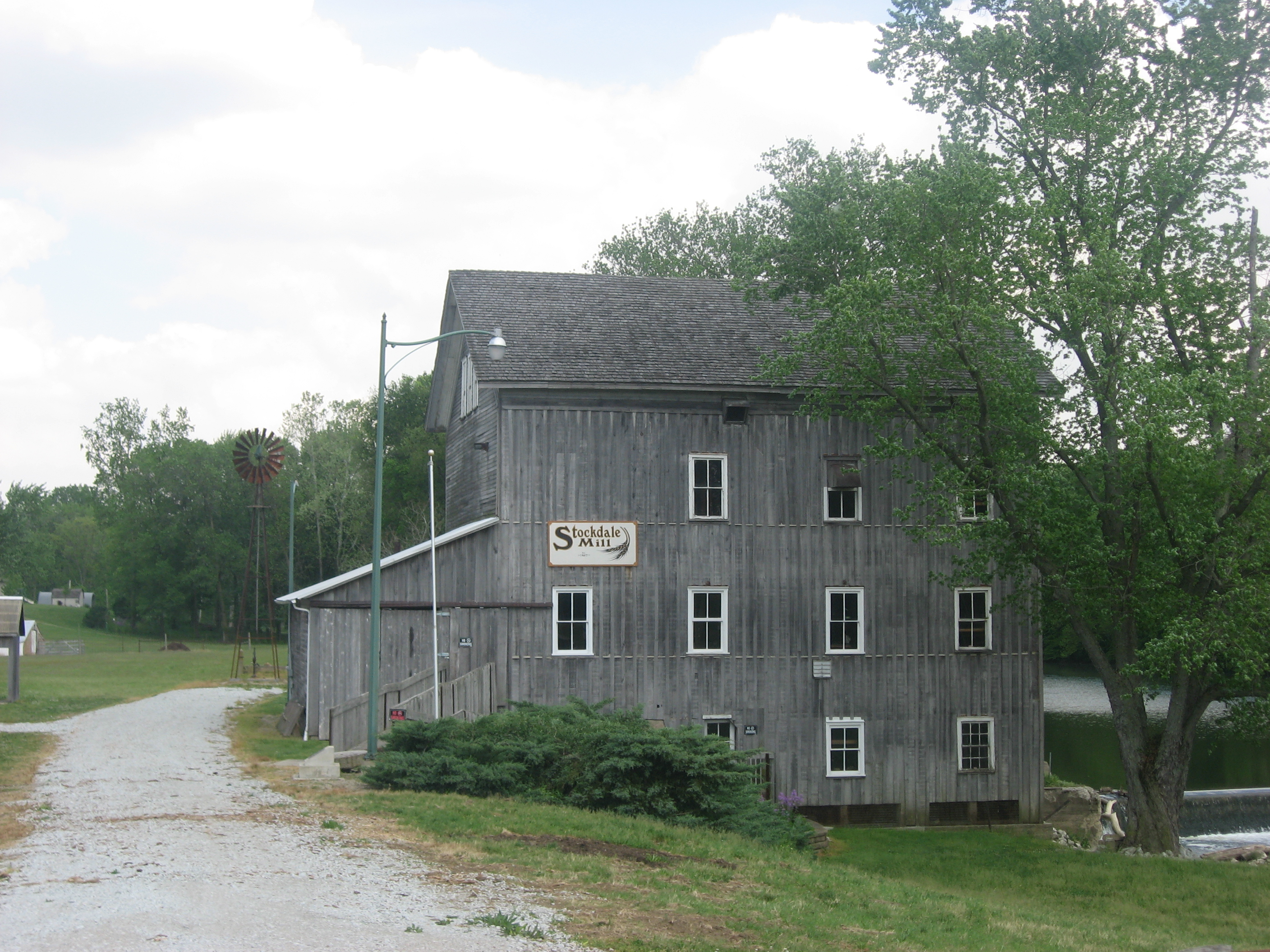
- Stockdale Mill, May 2012

- Location within Indiana Location within the United States
- Location: N. County Road 800W at Stockdale in Paw Paw Township, Wabash County, Indiana
- Coordinates: 40°54′52″N 85°56′37″W
- Area: 2.5 acres (1.0 ha)
- Built: 1857
- MPS: Grain Mills in Indiana MPS
- NRHP reference No.: 04000204
- Added to NRHP: March 24, 2004

Stockdale Mill, also known as the Roann Roller Mill, is a historic grist mill building located in Paw Paw Township, Wabash County, Indiana. It was built between 1855 and 1857, and is a 3 1/2-story, post and beam frame mill building. The mill is powered by a 202 foot long dam that spans the Eel River. Also on the property are the contributing storage building and corn crib. The mill remained in operation until 1964 and was restored in 2002.

It was listed on the National Register of Historic Places in 2004.
