= Tunworth =

Village and parish in Hampshire, England

Coordinates: 51.2167°N 1.0167°W

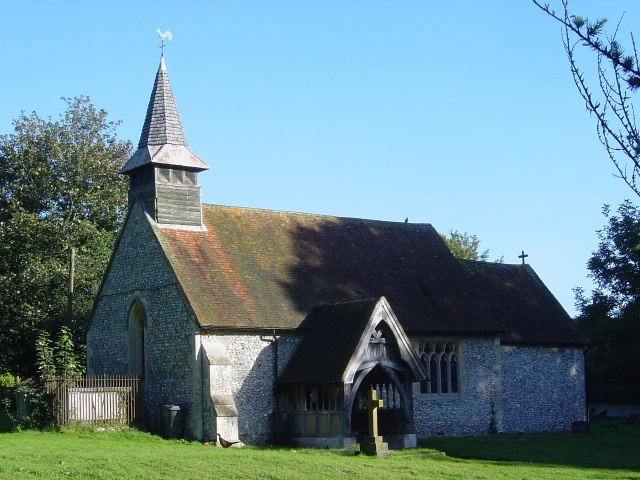
- All Saints Church, Tunworth

- Location within Hampshire
- Population: 224 (2011 Census including Weston Corbett, Weston Patrick and Winslade)
- Civil parish: Tunworth
- District: Basingstoke and Deane
- Shire county: Hampshire
- Region: South East
- Country: England
- Sovereign state: United Kingdom
- Post town: BASINGSTOKE
- Postcode district: RG25
- Dialling code: 01256
- Police: Hampshire and Isle of Wight
- Fire: Hampshire and Isle of Wight
- Ambulance: South Central
- UK Parliament: Basingstoke

Tunworth is a hamlet and civil parish in Hampshire.

== Geography ==
=== Location ===
Tunworth is located in North East Hampshire. Tunworth is located approximately 4 miles (6.4 km) from Basingstoke, the nearest major town. There are numerous villages nearby, such as (distances by road)

- Upton Grey, 1.5 miles (2.4 km) to the east
- Weston Patrick, 1.6 miles (2.6 km) to the south east
- Mapledurwell, 2.8 miles (4.5 km) to the north
- Winslade, 1.9 miles (3.0 km) to the west
- Herriard, 3.0 miles (4.8 km) to the south

=== Physical geography ===
The village is spread across several hills, known as the Tunworth Downs. These are caused by the same geological processes as the North Downs. The highest point in Tunworth is around 420 ft (130m)

== Buildings ==
The little downland church of All Saints, Tunworth, is part of the benefice of Upton Grey. The church is 12th century. The church has Norman origins, though the only real sign of this, after the Victorian restoration, is a window on the north (far) side of the church. A notable grave in the churchyard is that of Colonel Julian Berry, son of the 1st Viscount Camrose of Hackwood Park.

== Amenities ==
There is a bench at the village high point. In 2012, an oak was planted beside the bench to mark the Diamond Jubilee of Elizabeth II. There was a school in Tunworth, but this was closed down in the 1950s. Most children now attend either a Basingstoke School or Long Sutton School.

== Economy ==
The economy of Tunworth is mainly based in the service industry. The land around Tunworth is cultivated, meaning that there is some agriculture. In the past, successful race horses have been bred in Tunworth. A large proportion of Tunworth residents do not work, as Tunworth has a significant number of older people.

== Land ownership ==
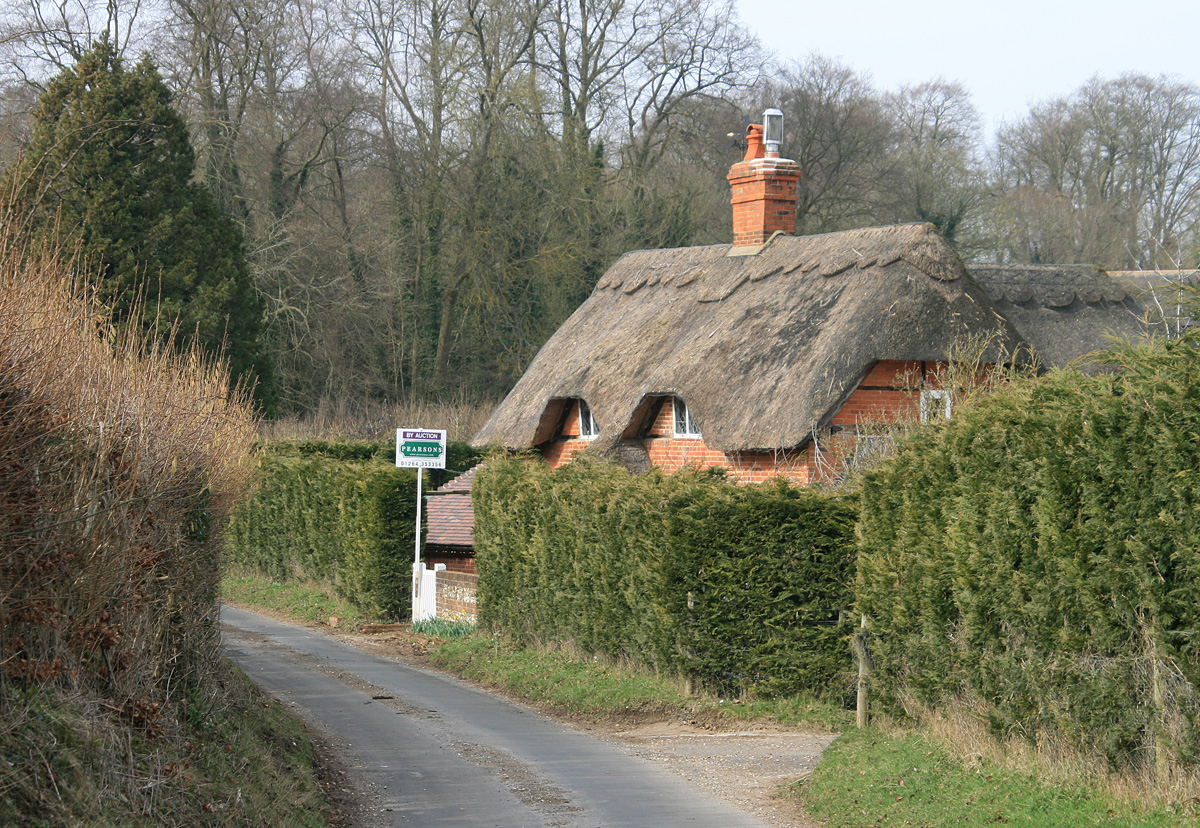
Rose Cottage

Most of the land around Tunworth is either owned by the Herriard Estate, or by Hackwood Park. This land is rented to various farmers and is also used for pheasant shooting. Some property is owned by the Herriard Estate as well, and is rented out.
