= Thomas Stockdale =

Thomas Stockdale may refer to:

- Thomas Stockdale (MP for Knaresborough) (died 1653), Parliamentarian and MP for Knaresborough
- Thomas Minshull Stockdale (1940–2021), English barrister and landowner
- Thomas Stockdale (MP for Appleby), represented Appleby (UK Parliament constituency) 1413 and 1417
- T. R. Stockdale (Thomas Ringland Stockdale, 1828–1899), American politician
