= Dall Fields =

Dall C. Fields (11 July 1889 Roann, Indiana — 17 August 1956) was an American bassoonist, composer, and music educator who for much of his career was based in and around Chicago. As a performer, he had been a bassoonist with the Cincinnati Symphony Orchestra, the Minneapolis Symphony Orchestra (1917–1918 season), the Chicago Philharmonic Orchestra (1st bassoon), and later, the Bachman Woodwind Ensemble. As an educator, he taught mostly in the Chicago area, teaching out of his own studio and through affiliations with the Maywood extension of the Chicago Conservatory of Music. He also taught at Yale University and through affiliations with August Bucci (1897–1935), William Johnson of Valparaiso, Indiana, and the Valpo Music House (serving Valparaiso and Porter County).

== Career highlights ==
In addition to being a bassoon virtuoso, Fields was proficient on other reed instruments, namely clarinet, saxophone, and oboe. He taught all the woodwind reed instruments.

Bachman Woodwind Ensemble
The Backman Band Woodwind Ensemble was organized to fill-in open time between seasons for members of the Bachman Band, a.k.a. "Bachman's Million Dollar Band," Harold Burton Bachman (1892–1972), conductor. During the 1930s, the group played concerts and gave music clinics for high schools and Universities in Iowa, Illinois, Wisconsin, Michigan, Indiana, Ohio, and Pennsylvania. Its members were:

- Frank Hale Phares (1902–1961), flute
- Joseph Olivadoti (1893–1977), oboe
- Gabriel Tose (1907–1984), clarinet
- Dall Fields, bassoon
- Earl E. Stricker (1902–1989), French horn
- Harry Sukman (1912–1984), piano

Faculty positions
From 1946 to 1950, Fields was an instructor of woodwinds at the Author Jordan Conservatory of Music. In 1947, Fields was Instructor of Applied Music at Ball State University. In 1948, he was on the music faculty of the Indiana State University College of Music. Also, in 1948, he gave private woodwind lessons at Hobart High School.

== Selected publications ==
- Bassoon Method, M.M. Cole, Chicago (publisher) (1937) OCLC 10134706
- Concertstück, Opus 13, composed by Édouard Flament (1880–1958), revised & edited by Dall Fields, Rubank, Chicago (publisher) (1940) OCLC 31278489
- Quartette, for woodwinds, composed by Dall Fields

== Discography ==
- Chicago Symphony Woodwind Quintet, Encore! 15 pieces, mono OCLC 7025985

Ralph Johnson, flute; Robert Mayer, oboe; Jerome Stowell, clarinet; Philip Farkas, French horn; Wilbur Simpson, bassoon
Recorded in Chicago, December 1953
Leo Delibes, Variations from 'Ballet la Source' arranged by Dall Fields
Gabriel Pierne, Entrance of the Little Fauns, arranged by Dall Fields

== Armed Forces during World War I ==
Fields served during World War I in the U.S. Navy from December 1917 to September 1921. He was assigned as a clarinetist aboard the USS Henderson (AP-1), a hospital ship.

== Family ==
Dall Fields was married to Martel Fields (born 1895). He died August 17, 1956, and was buried at Memorial Gardens Cemetery, Plymouth, Indiana.

== Memorial scholarship ==
The Dall Fields Memorial Scholarship is awarded annually to an Indiana State University undergraduate majoring in Music.

== Professional affiliations ==
- Phi Mu Alpha Sinfonia, Gamma Omega Chapter, Indiana State University
