= Paw Paw Township, Wabash County, Indiana =

Paw Paw Township
- Township
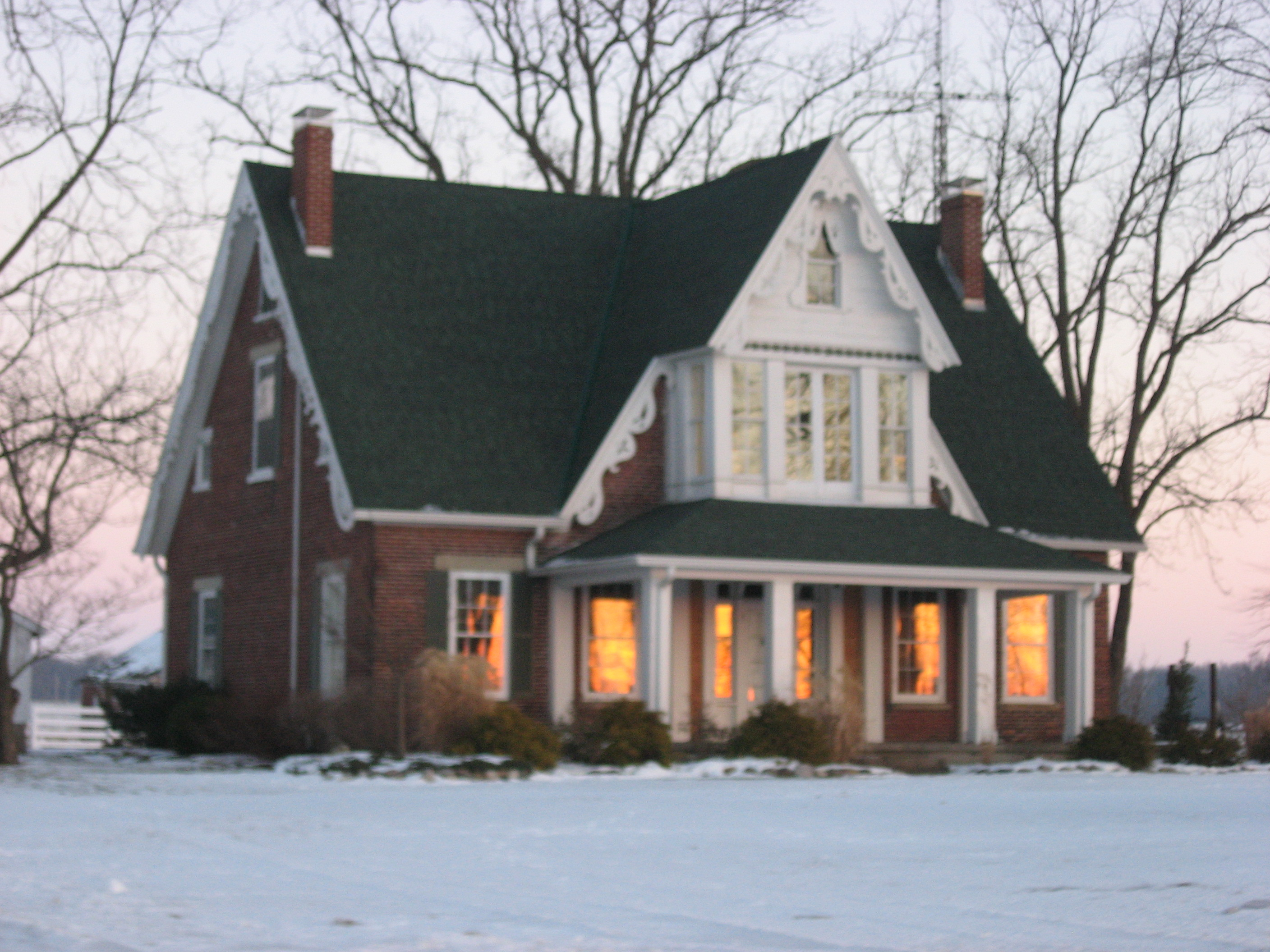
- Farmhouse at the Halderman-Van Buskirk Farmstead, a historic site south of Roann

- Location in Wabash County
- Coordinates: 40°53′55″N 85°51′52″W
- Country: United States
- State: Indiana
- County: Wabash

Government
  - Type: Indiana township

Area
  - Total: 40.47 sq mi (104.8 km^{2})
  - Land: 40.26 sq mi (104.3 km^{2})
  - Water: 0.21 sq mi (0.54 km^{2}) 0.52%
- Elevation: 771 ft (235 m)

Population (2020)
  - Total: 1,542
  - Density: 38.30/sq mi (14.79/km^{2})
- ZIP codes: 46926, 46962, 46974, 46990, 46992
- GNIS feature ID: 453711

Paw Paw Township is one of seven townships in Wabash County, Indiana, United States. As of the 2020 census, its population was 1,542 (down from 1,691 at 2010) and it contained 670 housing units.

== History ==
The Halderman-Van Buskirk Farmstead, Roann Covered Bridge, Roann Historic District, and Stockdale Mill are listed on the National Register of Historic Places.

== Geography ==
According to the 2010 census, the township has a total area of 40.47 square miles (104.8 km^{2}), of which 40.26 square miles (104.3 km^{2}) (or 99.48%) is land and 0.21 square miles (0.54 km^{2}) (or 0.52%) is water.

=== Cities, towns, villages ===
- Roann

=== Unincorporated towns ===
- Urbana at 40.898377°N 85.792763°W

(This list is based on USGS data and may include former settlements.)

=== Adjacent townships ===
- Pleasant Township (north)
- Chester Township (northeast)
- Lagro Township (southeast)
- Noble Township (south)
- Perry Township, Miami County (west)
- Richland Township, Miami County (west)

=== Cemeteries ===
The township contains these seven cemeteries: Abshire, Algers, Gamble, Independent Order of Odd Fellows, Jack, Long and Reeds.

== Education ==
- Metropolitan School District of Wabash County Schools

Paw Paw Township is served by the Roann-Paw Paw Township Public Library.

== Political districts ==
- Indiana's 5th congressional district
- State House District 22
- State Senate District 18
