= Mears Ashby =

Village in Northamptonshire, England

Coordinates: 52.29335°N 0.77205°W

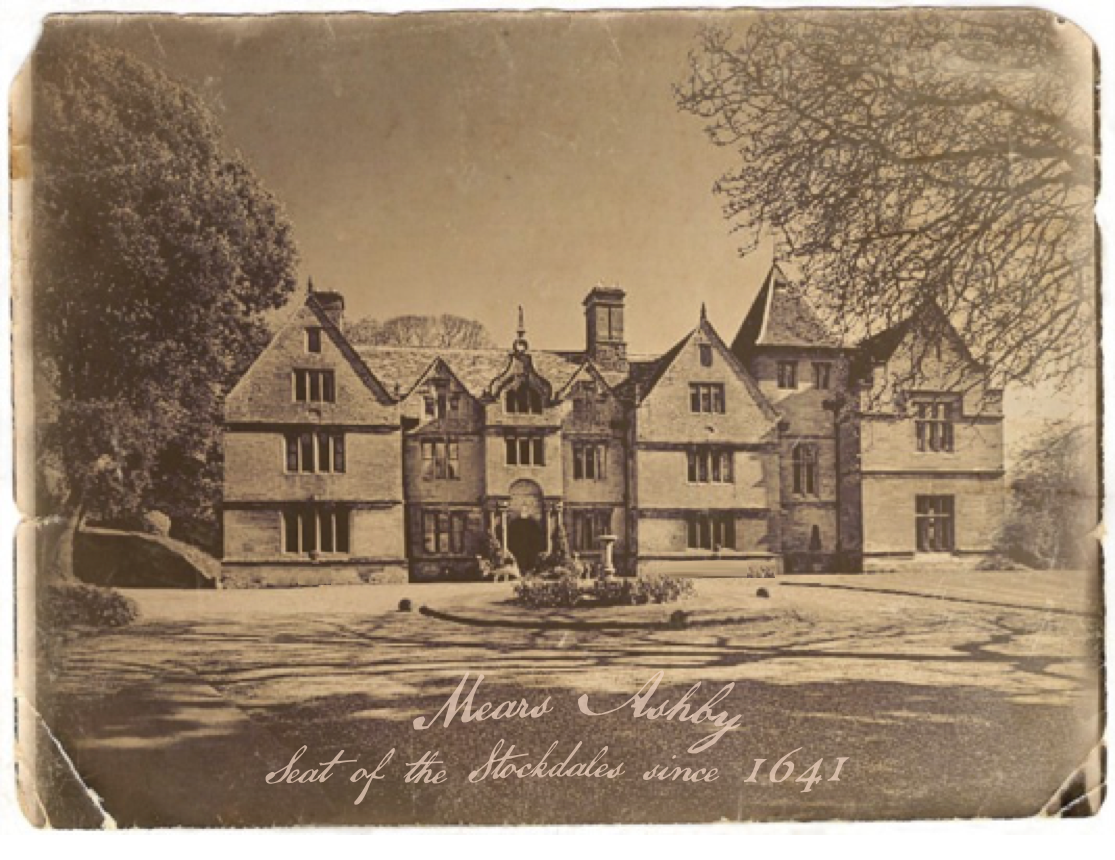

- Location within Northamptonshire
- Population: 473 (2011 census)
- OS grid reference: SP838666
- Unitary authority: North Northamptonshire
- Ceremonial county: Northamptonshire
- Region: East Midlands
- Country: England
- Sovereign state: United Kingdom
- Post town: NORTHAMPTON
- Postcode district: NN6
- Dialling code: 01604
- Police: Northamptonshire
- Fire: Northamptonshire
- Ambulance: East Midlands
- UK Parliament: Wellingborough

Mears Ashby is a village in the county of Northamptonshire, England. It lies between the county town of Northampton and Wellingborough and was in the West ward of borough council of Wellingborough area which also included Sywell prior to local government reform in 2021. At the time of the 2011 census, it had a population of 473.

The villages name means 'Ash-tree farm/settlement' or perhaps, 'Aski's farm/settlement'. The village was held by Robert de Mares in 1242.

== Mears Ashby Hall and Estate ==
Located to the south of the village is Mears Ashby Hall, a fine Grade II* listed Jacobean Manor House. The Hall was built in 1637 and was owned by the Stockdale family (Stockdale Baronets), who descend from the Yorkshire landowning family of the same name. In 1859 the East Wing by Anthony Salvin was added by Henry Stockdale. During the 1980s the Hall became known for performances of Operatic Music organised by Frederick Stockdale. The long association of the Stockdale family at Mears Ashby Hall ended when in the 1990s when the house was sold and Hoddington House became the principal family residence. There are a number of windows in the village church commissioned by Sir Edmund Stockdale by noted stained glass artist Lawrence Lee which depict the family's links to the village.

== Witchcraft ==
According to Westwood and Simpson in their book, The Lore of the Land, the county in general and Mears Ashby, in particular, has a long tradition of witchcraft and accusations of witchcraft. In their book they recall that as late as 1785 a local inhabitant, Sarah Bradshaw, was so accused. We learn from the Northampton Mercury on 1 August 1785 that:

Thursday last, a poor woman, named Sarah Bradshaw of Mears Ashby...who was accused by some of her neighbours of being a witch, in order to prove her innocence, submitted to the ignominy of being dipped (on a ducking-stool); when she immediately sunk to the bottom of the pond; which was deemed an incontestable proof that she was no witch!
