= Thomas J. Lewis House =

Historic house in Indiana, United States

- U.S. National Register of Historic Places
- U.S. Historic district – Contributing property
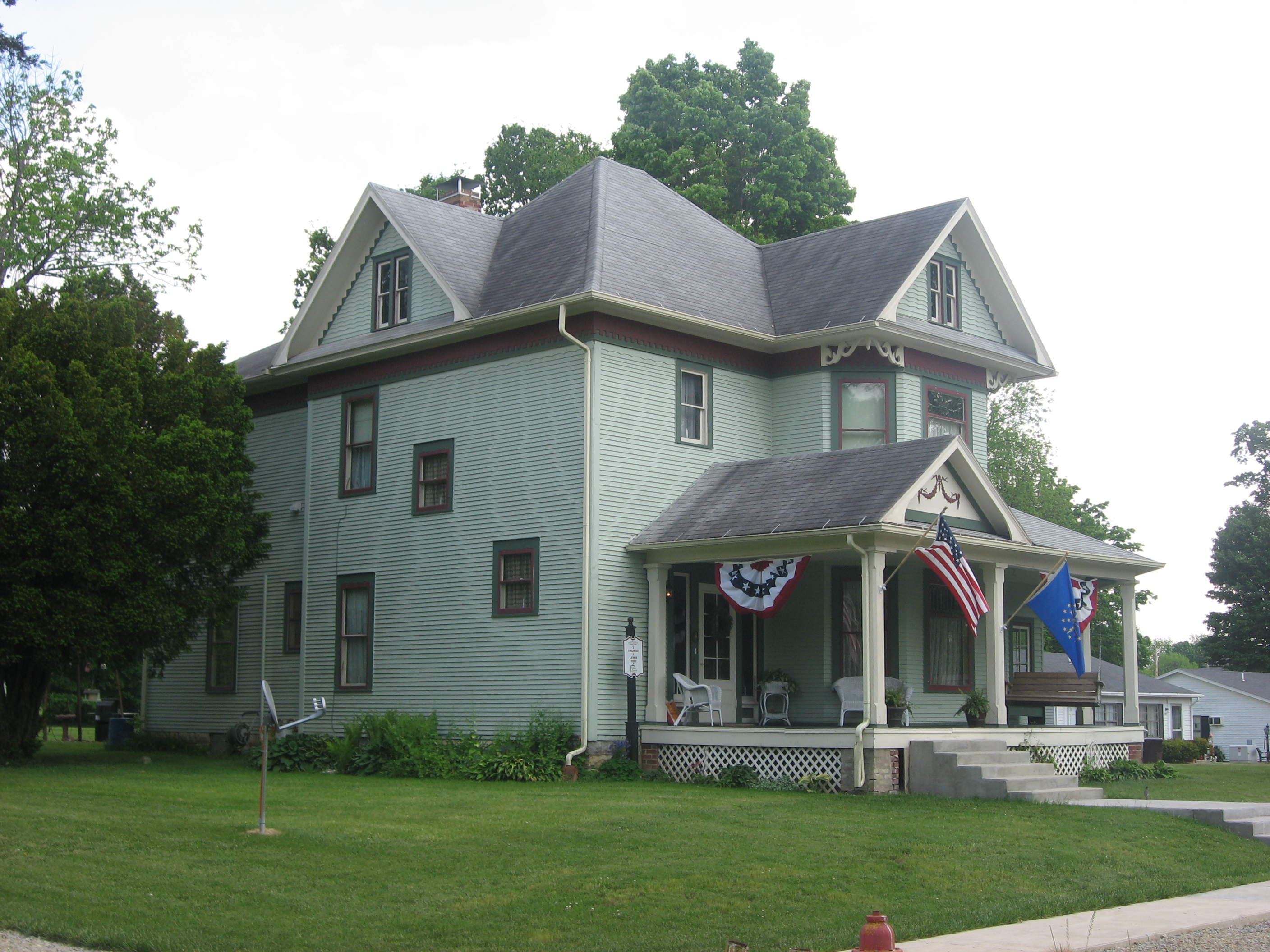
- Thomas J. Lewis House, May 2012

- Location within Indiana Location within the United States
- Location: 105 S. Arnold St., Roann, Indiana
- Coordinates: 40°54′41″N 85°55′18″W
- Area: 0 acres (0 ha)
- Built: c. 1903
- Architectural style: Queen Anne
- NRHP reference No.: 06000521
- Added to NRHP: June 21, 2006

Thomas J. Lewis House is a historic home located at Roann, Indiana. It was built about 1903, and is a 2 1/2-story, Queen Anne style frame dwelling. It sits on a stone and brick foundation and has a hipped roof with gabled dormers. It features a full-width front porch and two-story bay. Also on the property are the contributing cistern and windmill frame.

It was listed on the National Register of Historic Places in 2006. It is located in the Roann Historic District.
