= Jack P. Oliver =

American politician (1931–2020)

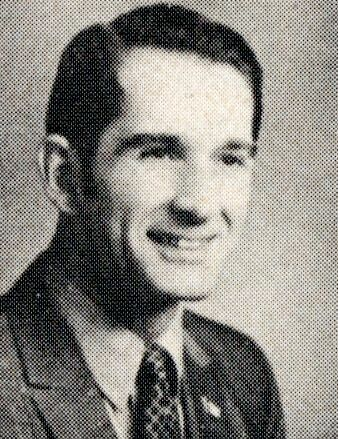

Member of the Ohio House of Representatives from the 3rd district
- In office January 3, 1969 – December 31, 1972
- Preceded by: Vaughn Stocksdale
- Succeeded by: Dale Locker

Personal details
- Born: Jack Phillip Oliver; October 16, 1931 Rochester, Indiana, U.S.
- Died: April 2, 2020 (aged 88) Ohio, U.S.
- Party: Republican
- Spouse: Martha Lee Kreider (m. 1955)
- Children: Steven Matthew (1962); Amy Lou (1965)
- Education: Ball State University

Jack Phillip Oliver (October 16, 1931 – April 2, 2020) was an American politician who was a Republican member of the Ohio House of Representatives, representing the 3rd District from 1969 to 1972. Oliver died on April 2, 2020, at the age of 88.
