= Roann Covered Bridge =

- 4th Roann Covered Bridge
- U.S. National Register of Historic Places
- U.S. Historic district – Contributing property
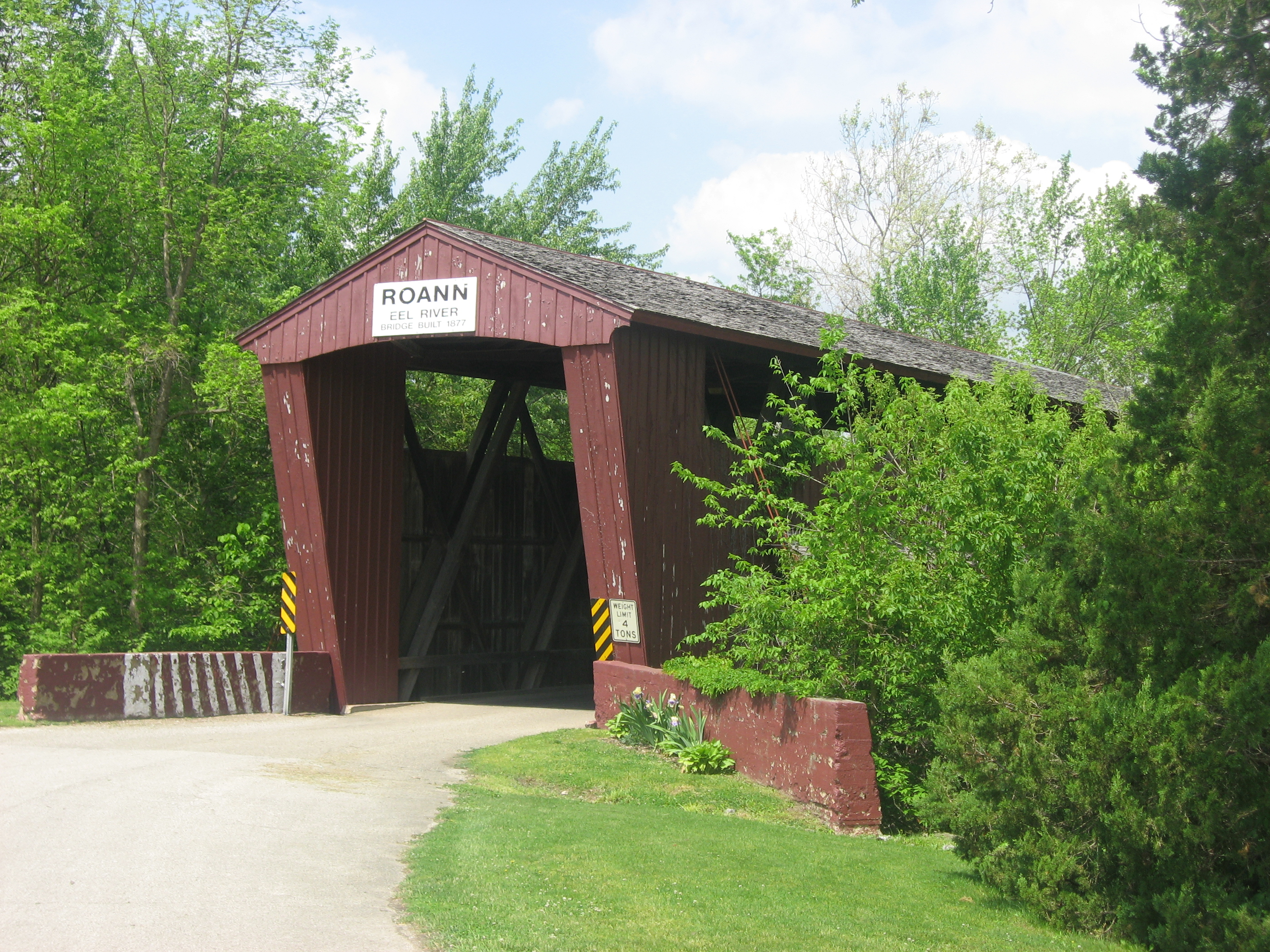
- Roann Covered Bridge, May 2012

- Location within Indiana Location within the United States
- Nearest city: North of Roann on N. County Road 700W, Paw Paw Township, Wabash County, Indiana
- Coordinates: 40°54′55″N 85°55′27″W
- Area: less than one acre
- Built: 1877
- Built by: Smith, Robert W.
- Architectural style: Howe Truss
- NRHP reference No.: 81000022
- Added to NRHP: August 6, 1981

Roann Bridge Fire, September 1990

4th Roann Covered Bridge is a historic Howe Truss covered bridge located in Paw Paw Township, Wabash County, Indiana. It was built in 1877 by the Smith Bridge Company of Toledo, Ohio and crosses the Eel River. It measures 288 feet long and is 15 feet, 4 inches wide. The bridge has painted board and batten siding.

It was listed on the National Register of Historic Places in 1981. It is located in the Roann Historic District.

On September 28, 1990, A fire broke out around 8:00 pm The bridge was almost completely destroyed. In 1992 the Limberlost Construction Company finished a complete renovation which included a sprinkler system.
