= Herriard =

Village and parish in Hampshire, England

Coordinates: 51°12′34″N 1°03′07″W

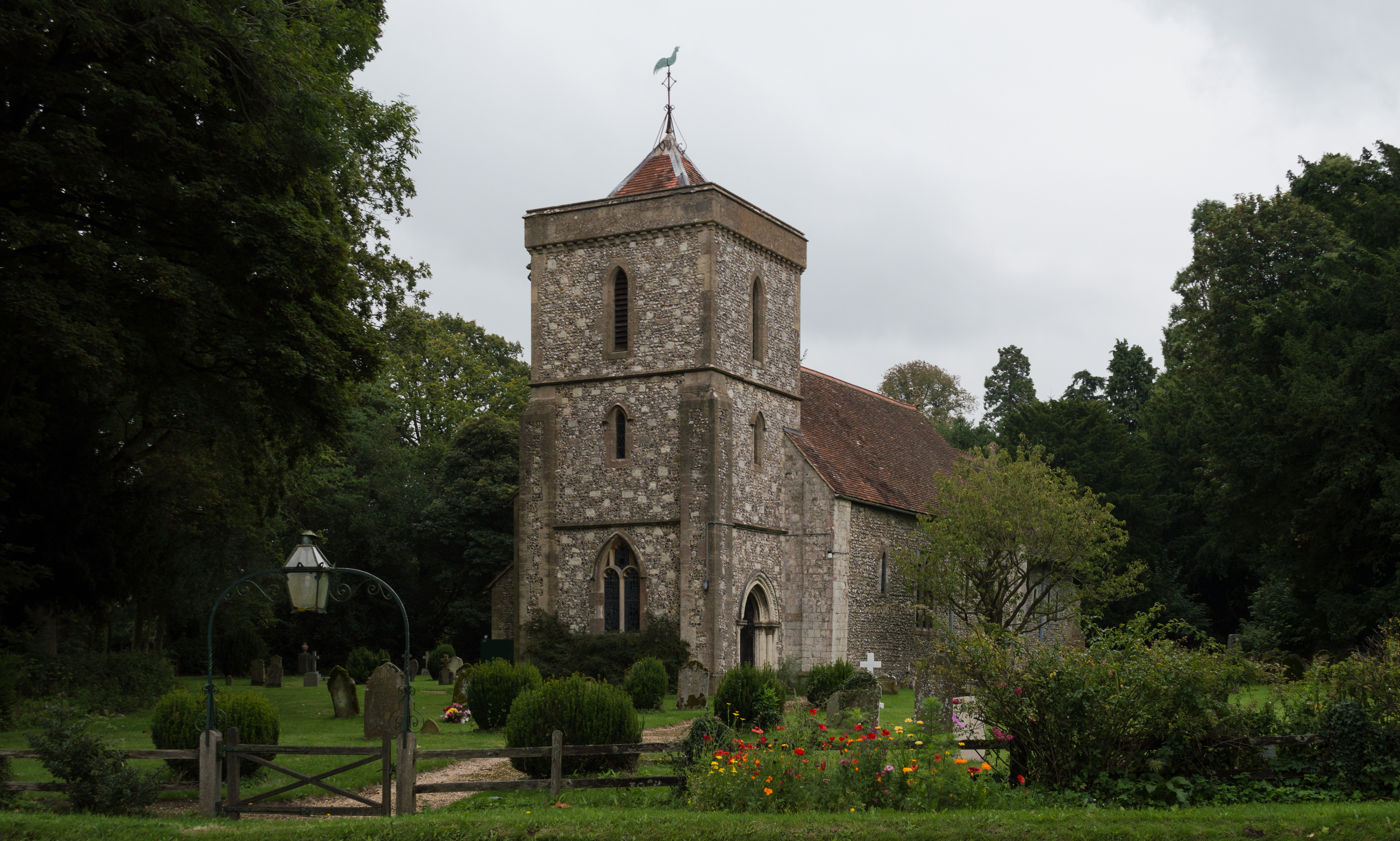
- Herriard Church

- Location within Hampshire
- Population: 253
- OS grid reference: SU663460
- Civil parish: Herriard
- District: Basingstoke and Deane
- Shire county: Hampshire
- Region: South East
- Country: England
- Sovereign state: United Kingdom
- Post town: BASINGSTOKE
- Postcode district: RG25
- Dialling code: 01256
- Police: Hampshire and Isle of Wight
- Fire: Hampshire and Isle of Wight
- Ambulance: South Central
- UK Parliament: North East Hampshire
- Website: Herriard parish council

Herriard is a village and civil parish in the Basingstoke and Deane district of Hampshire, England. Its nearest town is Basingstoke, which lies 4 1/2 miles (7.2 km) north. The village is situated mainly on the A339 road between Alton, and Basingstoke. At the 2001 census, it had a population of 247, increasing marginally to 251 at the 2011 Census. It was formerly served by the now-disused Herriard railway station on the Basingstoke and Alton Light Railway.

== Governance ==
The village of Herriard is part of the civil parish of Herriard and is part of the Upton Grey and the Candovers ward of Basingstoke and Deane borough council. The borough council is a Non-metropolitan district of Hampshire County Council.

== Geography ==
The parish also contains the village of Southrope, and the hamlet of Nashes Green. It borders the Hampshire parishes of Winslade to the north, Tunworth to the north-east, Weston Patrick to the east, Lasham to the south and Ellisfield to the west.

== Buildings ==
St. Mary's Church in Herriard was built by Sir Richard de Herriard around 1200. There was a major refurbishment and the western tower was added in 1878 for Francis Jervoise. Herriard House was a Queen Anne mansion demolished in the 1960s. It was the home of the Jervoise family.

== Notable residents ==
- George Puttenham. The Elizabethan poet lived at Herriard House which was his wife's inheritance. He beat her and had affairs with all their maidservants, impregnating most of them. He also kept a young sex slave at Upton Grey. When two Royal officials came to arrest him, he had his servants tie them up in Herriard churchyard, where he beat them about the head with a foot whipping cane.

== Economy ==
Herriard is home to a number of businesses, such as AVS Fencing Supplies (formerly the Herriard Sawmills site), mixing console manufacturer Audient, and medical communications consultancy Strategen.
