= Roann Historic District =

Historic district in Indiana, United States

- U.S. National Register of Historic Places
- U.S. Historic district
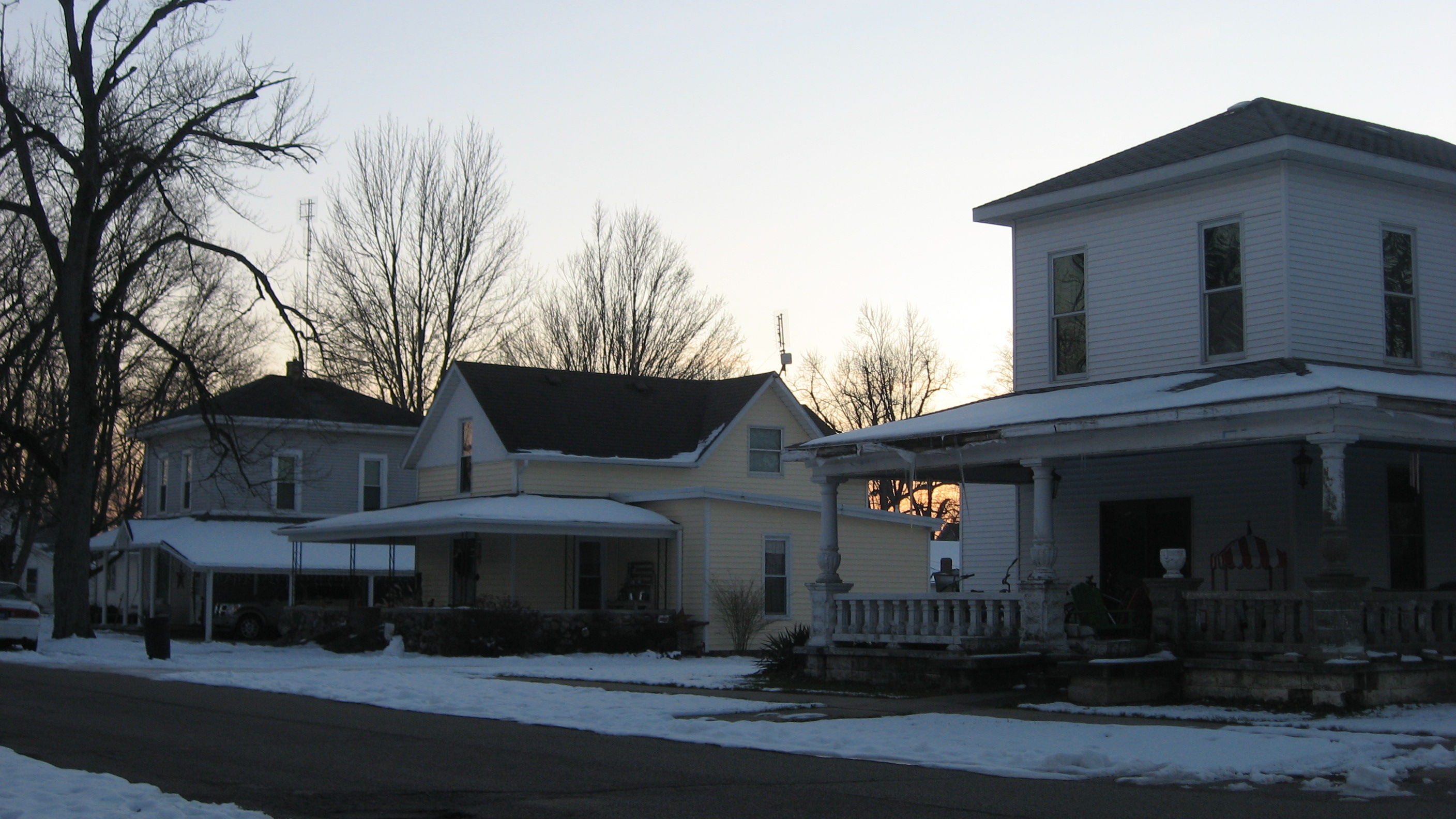
- Church south of Pike in Roann, January 2013

- Location within Indiana Location within the United States
- Location: Roughly bounded by State Road 16 and West, Ohio, and Beamer Sts., Roann and Paw Paw Township, Wabash County, Indiana
- Coordinates: 40°54′40″N 85°55′30″W
- Area: 116 acres (47 ha)
- Architect: Needham Brothers; Brown, Everett
- Architectural style: Gothic, Italianate, Queen Anne, Romanesque Revival, Classical Revival, Bungalow/Craftsman
- NRHP reference No.: 13000093
- Added to NRHP: March 20, 2013

Roann Historic District is a national historic district located at Roann and Paw Paw Township, Wabash County, Indiana. It encompasses 117 contributing buildings, two contributing sites, and one contributing structure in the central business district and surrounding residential sections of Roann. It developed between about 1853 and 1961, and includes representative examples of Gothic Revival, Italianate, Queen Anne, Second Empire, Colonial Revival, and Streamline Moderne style architecture. Located in the district are the separately listed Roann Covered Bridge, Roann-Paw Paw Township Public Library, and Thomas J. Lewis House. Other notable buildings include the First Brethren Church (1891), Dersham House and Veterinary Clinic (c. 1885), Roann Christian Church (1961), Watson House (c. 1940), Universalist Church (1875), Roann Methodist Church (1898), Paw Paw Township School (1941), James Van Buskirk House (c. 1873), Halderman Building (c. 1885), U.S. Post Office and Medical Building (1958), Nicely Oil Service Station (1938), Comer Building (1920), and Spiece House (c. 1885).

It was listed on the National Register of Historic Places in 2013.
