= Stockdale baronets =

Baronetcy in the Baronetage of the United Kingdom

The Stockdale Baronetcy, of Hoddington in the County of Southampton, is a title in the Baronetage of the United Kingdom. It was created by the Queen on 5 December 1960 for Edmund Stockdale, Lord Mayor of London from 1959 to 1960. The title was for him and "the heirs made of his body lawfully begotten." As of 2021 the title is held by his grandson, the third Baronet, who succeeded in that year.

== Stockdale baronets, of Hoddington (1960) ==
- Sir Edmund Villiers Minshull Stockdale, 1st Baronet (1903–1989)
- Sir Thomas Minshull Stockdale, 2nd Baronet (1940–2021) married (1965) Jacqueline Ha Van Vuong: their daughter is the fashion writer and stylist Charlotte Stockdale.
- Sir John Minshull Stockdale, 3rd Baronet (born 1967)

== Arms ==
Coat of arms of Stockdale baronets
Crest Issuant from a crown Or a griffin's head Gules. Escutcheon Ermine on a bend Sable between two escallops Gules three pheons Argent. Motto Omnia Mei Dona Dei (All Things are God's Gifts)
