= Roann-Paw Paw Township Public Library =

- U.S. National Register of Historic Places
- U.S. Historic district – Contributing property
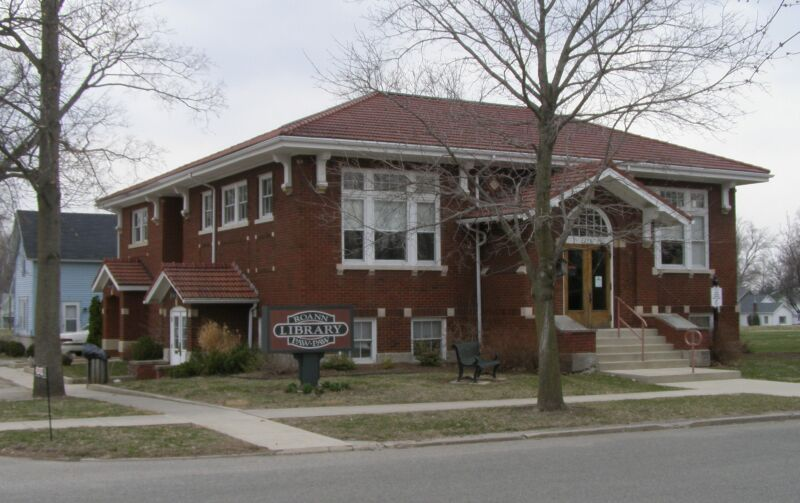
- Roann Carnegie Library, April 2011

- Location within Indiana Location within the United States
- Location: 240 S. Chippewa Rd., Roann, Indiana
- Coordinates: 40°54′36″N 85°55′29″W
- Area: 0 acres (0 ha)
- Built: 1916
- Architectural style: Bungalow/craftsman
- NRHP reference No.: 02001561
- Added to NRHP: December 20, 2002

Roann-Paw Paw Township Public Library is a historic Carnegie library building located at Roann, Indiana. It was built in 1916, and is a one-story, rectangular, American Craftsman style brick building over a semi-recessed basement. It has a hipped roof of clay tile and wooden eave brackets. The building feature two enclosed entries and limestone detailing. It was built in part with an $8,000 grant from the Carnegie Foundation.

It was listed on the National Register of Historic Places in 2002. It is located in the Roann Historic District.

The Roann-Paw Paw Township Public Library remains an active lending library; it is one of three public library systems in Wabash County.
