= Thomas Minshull Stockdale =

English barrister and landowner (1940–2021)

Sir Thomas Minshull Stockdale
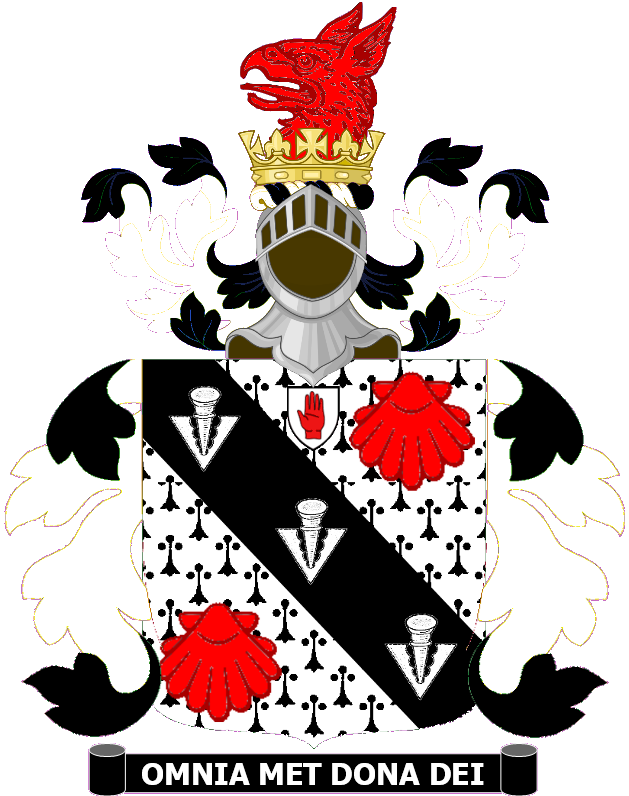
- Born: 7 January 1940
- Died: 28 October 2021 (aged 81)
- Education: Eton College
- Alma mater: University of Oxford
- Occupation: Barrister of Law

Sir Thomas Minshull Stockdale, 2nd Baronet (7 January 1940 – 28 October 2021) was an English barrister and landowner.

== Life ==
Sir Thomas was born on 7 January 1940 the son of Sir Edmund Stockdale and Lady Louise Stockdale (née Fermor-Hesketh). His family had been seated at Mears Ashby Hall since the 1600s and can trace their ancestry back to Edward II of England. Sir Thomas Stockdale was educated at Ludgrove School and Eton College in Berkshire before graduating with an M.A. from Worcester College, University of Oxford. In 1966, he was admitted to Inner Temple and began practice as a barrister.

Sir Thomas Minshull Stockdale married artist Jacqueline Ha-Van-Vuong on 5 June 1965, they had issue:

- John Stockdale (b. 1967)
- Charlotte Stockdale (b. 1970)

Stockdale succeeded his father's title as the 2nd Baronet Stockdale, of Hoddington in 1989. He died on 28 October 2021, at the age of 81.

Baronetage of the United Kingdom
Preceded by Edmund Stockdale	Baronet (of Hoddington); 1989–2021	Succeeded by John Stockdale
