= Roann, Indiana =

- Town
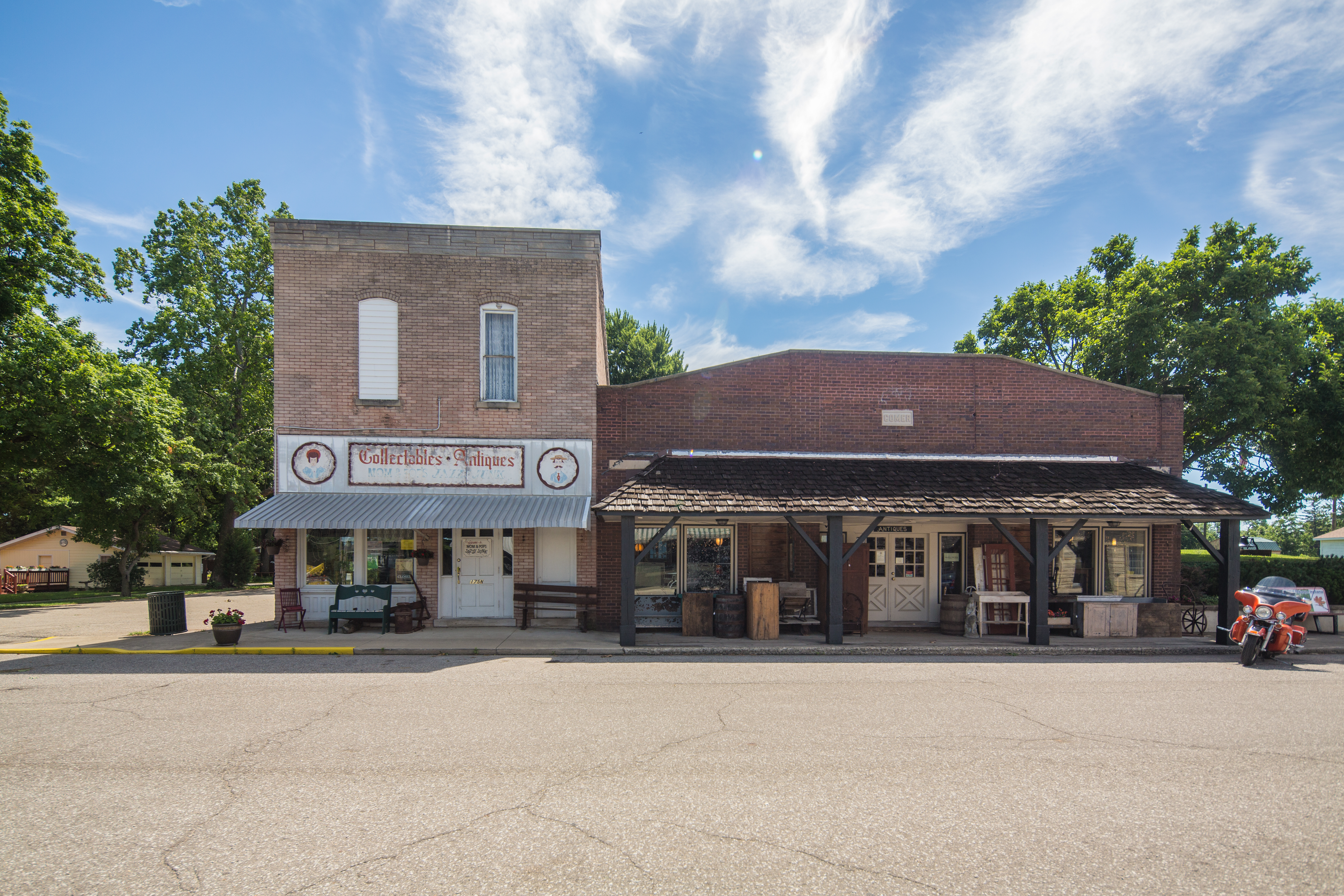

- Location of Roann in Wabash County, Indiana.
- Coordinates: 40°54′40″N 85°55′28″W
- Country: United States
- State: Indiana
- County: Wabash
- Township: Paw Paw

Area
  - Total: 0.23 sq mi (0.59 km^{2})
  - Land: 0.23 sq mi (0.59 km^{2})
  - Water: 0 sq mi (0.00 km^{2})
- Elevation: 748 ft (228 m)

Population (2020)
  - Total: 441
  - Density: 1,938.2/sq mi (748.36/km^{2})
- Time zone: UTC-5 (Eastern (EST))
  - Summer (DST): UTC-4 (EDT)
- ZIP code: 46974
- Area code: 765
- FIPS code: 18-64998
- GNIS feature ID: 2396884
- Website: www.in.gov/towns/roann/

Roann is a town in Paw Paw Township, Wabash County, in the U.S. state of Indiana. The population was 441 at the 2020 census.

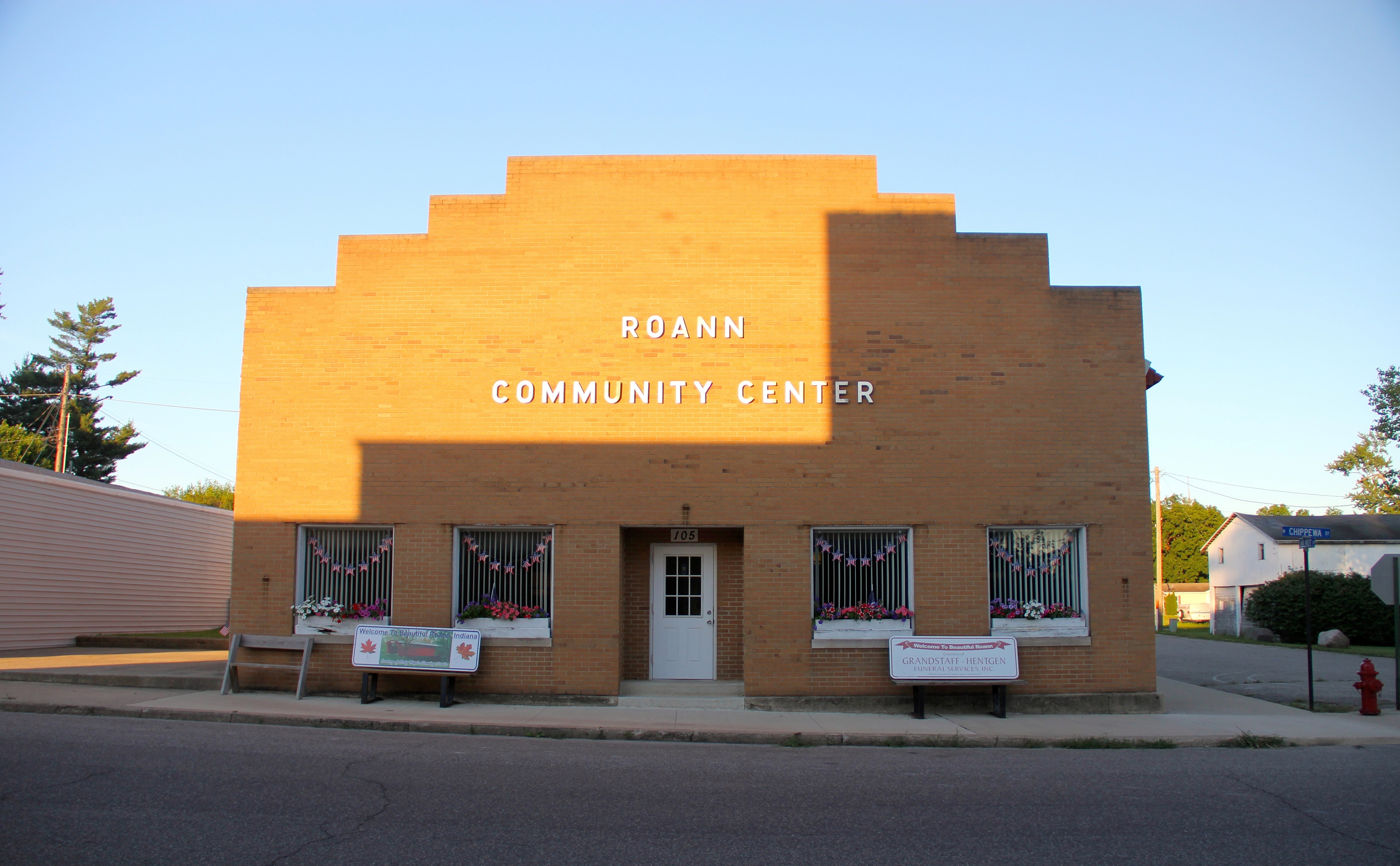
Roann Community Center

== History ==
There are two theories on how the town of Roann got its name. One source claims that the community was named for Roanne, France. Another tells a legend about how a father saw his daughter on a boat in a dangerous current and was shouting at her "Row, Ann!"

The Roann post office has been in operation since 1866.

The Thomas J. Lewis House, Roann Covered Bridge, Roann Historic District, and Roann-Paw Paw Township Public Library are listed on the National Register of Historic Places.

== Geography ==
According to the 2010 census, Roann has a total area of 0.23 square miles (0.60 km^{2}), all land.

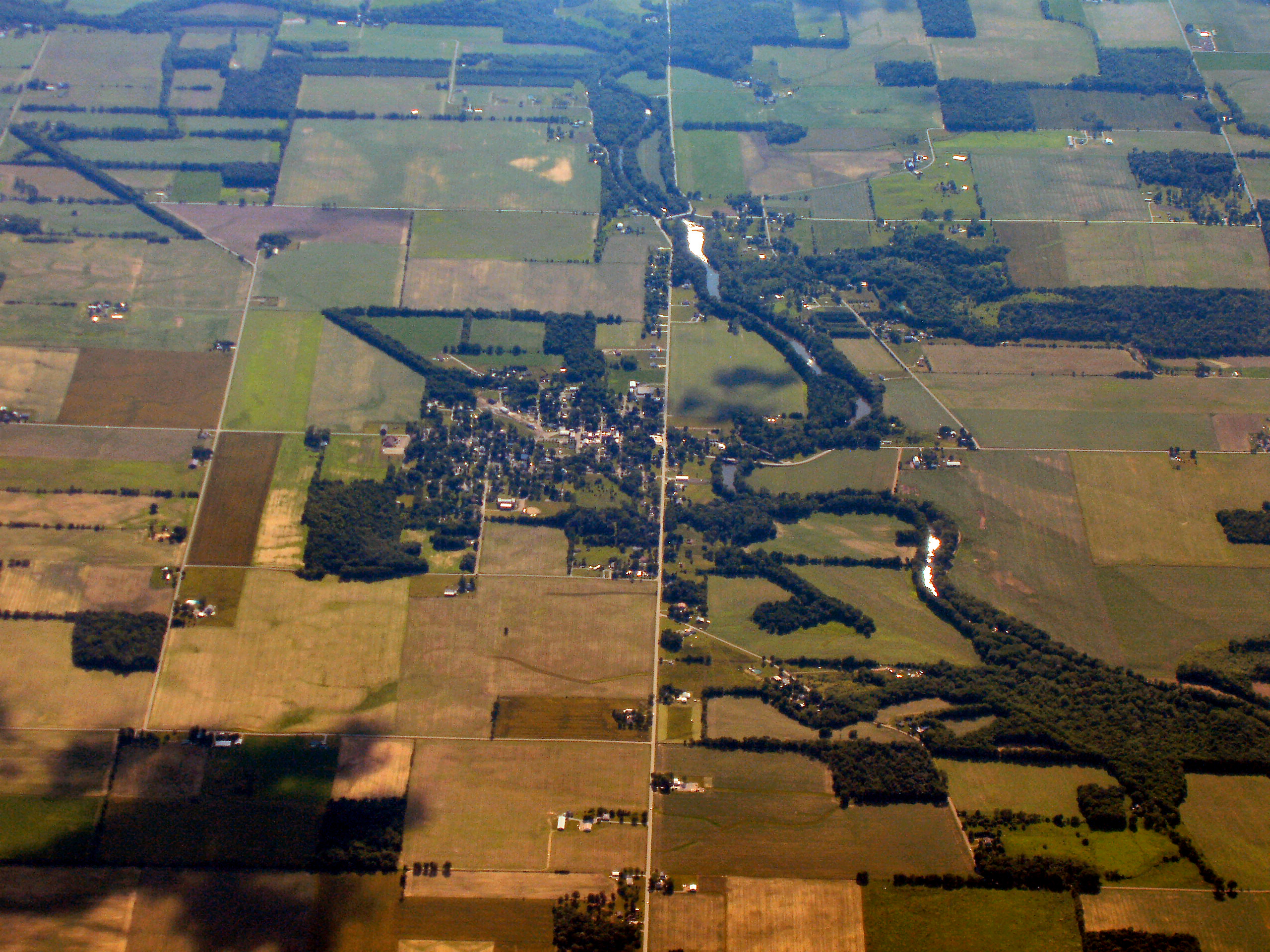
Roann from the air, looking west

== Demographics ==
Historical population
Census	Pop.	Note	%±
1880	350		—
1890	582		66.3%
1900	631		8.4%
1910	447		−29.2%
1920	414		−7.4%
1930	395		−4.6%
1940	429		8.6%
1950	492		14.7%
1960	478		−2.8%
1970	509		6.5%
1980	548		7.7%
1990	447		−18.4%
2000	400		−10.5%
2010	479		19.8%
2020	441		−7.9%
U.S. Decennial Census

=== 2010 census ===
As of the census of 2010, there were 479 people, 186 households, and 130 families living in the town. The population density was 2,082.6 inhabitants per square mile (804.1/km^{2}). There were 208 housing units at an average density of 904.3 per square mile (349.2/km^{2}). The racial makeup of the town was 98.5% White, 0.6% Native American, 0.4% Asian, and 0.4% from two or more races.

There were 186 households, of which 34.9% had children under the age of 18 living with them, 54.3% were married couples living together, 11.3% had a female householder with no husband present, 4.3% had a male householder with no wife present, and 30.1% were non-families. 27.4% of all households were made up of individuals, and 16.1% had someone living alone who was 65 years of age or older. The average household size was 2.58 and the average family size was 3.10.

The median age in the town was 35.6 years. 28% of residents were under the age of 18; 8.3% were between the ages of 18 and 24; 25.9% were from 25 to 44; 21.4% were from 45 to 64; and 16.5% were 65 years of age or older. The gender makeup of the town was 45.9% male and 54.1% female.

=== 2000 census ===
As of the census of 2000, there were 400 people, 153 households, and 117 families living in the town. The population density was 2,226.4 inhabitants per square mile (859.6/km^{2}). There were 164 housing units at an average density of 912.8 per square mile (352.4/km^{2}). The racial makeup of the town was 98.00% White, 0.25% from other races, and 1.75% from two or more races. Hispanic or Latino of any race were 0.25% of the population.

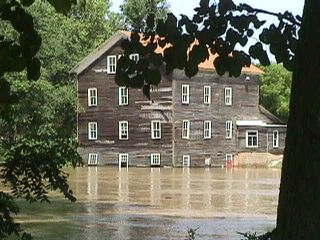
Stockdale Mill on the northern Eel River at Roann in June 1998

There were 154 households, out of which 36.6% had children under the age of 18 living with them, 61.4% were married couples living together, 8.5% had a female householder with no husband present, and 22.9% were non-families. 21.6% of all households were made up of individuals, and 11.1% had someone living alone who was 65 years of age or older. The average household size was 2.61 and the average family size was 2.99.

In the town, the population was spread out, with 27.5% under the age of 18, 9.0% from 18 to 24, 26.0% from 25 to 44, 25.0% from 45 to 64, and 12.5% who were 65 years of age or older. The median age was 35 years. For every 100 females, there were 91.4 males. For every 100 females age 18 and over, there were 94.6 males.

The median income for a household in the town was $41,000, and the median income for a family was $42,955. Males had a median income of $29,833 versus $22,411 for females. The per capita income for the town was $20,880. About 4.8% of families and 9.5% of the population were below the poverty line, including 12.7% of those under age 18 and 9.1% of those age 65 or over.

== Education ==
The town has a lending library, the Roann-Paw Paw Township Public Library.

== Arts and culture ==
Each September, Roann holds the Covered Bridge Festival the weekend after Labor Day.

== Notable people ==
- John V. Beamer, Congressman
- Dall Fields, classical bassoonist
