= Vaughn Stocksdale =

American politician (1939–2016)

Member of the Ohio House of Representatives from the 3rd district
- In office January 3, 1967-December 31, 1968
- Preceded by: Districts Created
- Succeeded by: Jack P. Oliver

Personal details
- Born: October 27, 1939 Darke County, Ohio, U.S.
- Died: March 29, 2016 (aged 76) Columbus, Ohio, U.S.
- Party: Democratic
- Spouse: Cynthia D. Stark
- Profession: Teacher, lawyer, cabinet maker

Vaughn Stocksdale (October 27, 1939 – March 29, 2016) was a Democratic member of the Ohio House of Representatives, representing the 3rd District from 1965 to 1968.

Stocksdale was a Democratic representative from conservative Darke County, serving as one of the only Democratic representatives from rural western Ohio. He did not seek re-election in 1968. He died on March 29, 2016, at the age of 76.
