= Edmund Stockdale =

English banker

Sir Edmund Villiers Minshull Stockdale, 1st Baronet (16 April 1903 – 24 March 1989) was an English banker who served as the 632nd Lord Mayor of London from 1959 to 1960.

== Life ==
Edmund Stockdale was born on 16 April 1903, the son of Major Henry Stockdale and Florence (née Villiers). Stockdale was raised at Mears Ashby Hall which had been in the possession of the family since the mid-1600s. He was educated at Wellington College in Berkshire. Edmund Stockdale married the Hon. Louise Fermor-Hesketh daughter of Sir Thomas Fermor-Hesketh, Baron Hesketh in 1937.

Stockdale began his career with the Bank of England in 1921, serving as deputy principal of the bank in 1948. In 1948, Stockdale held the office of Justice of the Peace for the City of London. In 1955 he was knighted for services to banking and in 1959 he was elected Lord Mayor of London.

He purchased the Hoddington House Estate in Upton Grey in c1945, which upon the death of his wife in 1994 was inherited by the 3rd Baronet, who sold the house with 809 acres in c2012 asking £20m (keeping 1,000 acres).

On 5 December 1960, Stockdale was created Baronet of Hoddington in the County of Southampton by the Queen.

Baronetage of the United Kingdom
New creation	Baronet (of Hoddington); 1960–1989	Succeeded by Thomas Stockdale
