= USS Stockdale =

USS Stockdale may refer to the following ships of the United States Navy. The three ships were decommissioned in three different centuries.

- USS Stockdale (1863), was a steamer purchased in 1863. She served as a tinclad in the American Civil War and decommissioned in 1865
- USS Stockdale (DE-399), was a destroyer escort commissioned in 1943 and decommissioned in 1946
- USS Stockdale (DDG-106), is an Arleigh Burke-class guided missile destroyer commissioned in 2009
