= Stockdale High School =

Stockdale High School is the name of the following high schools in the United States:

- Stockdale High School (Bakersfield, California)
- Stockdale High School (Stockdale, Texas)
