= Stockdale, Indiana =

- Unincorporated community
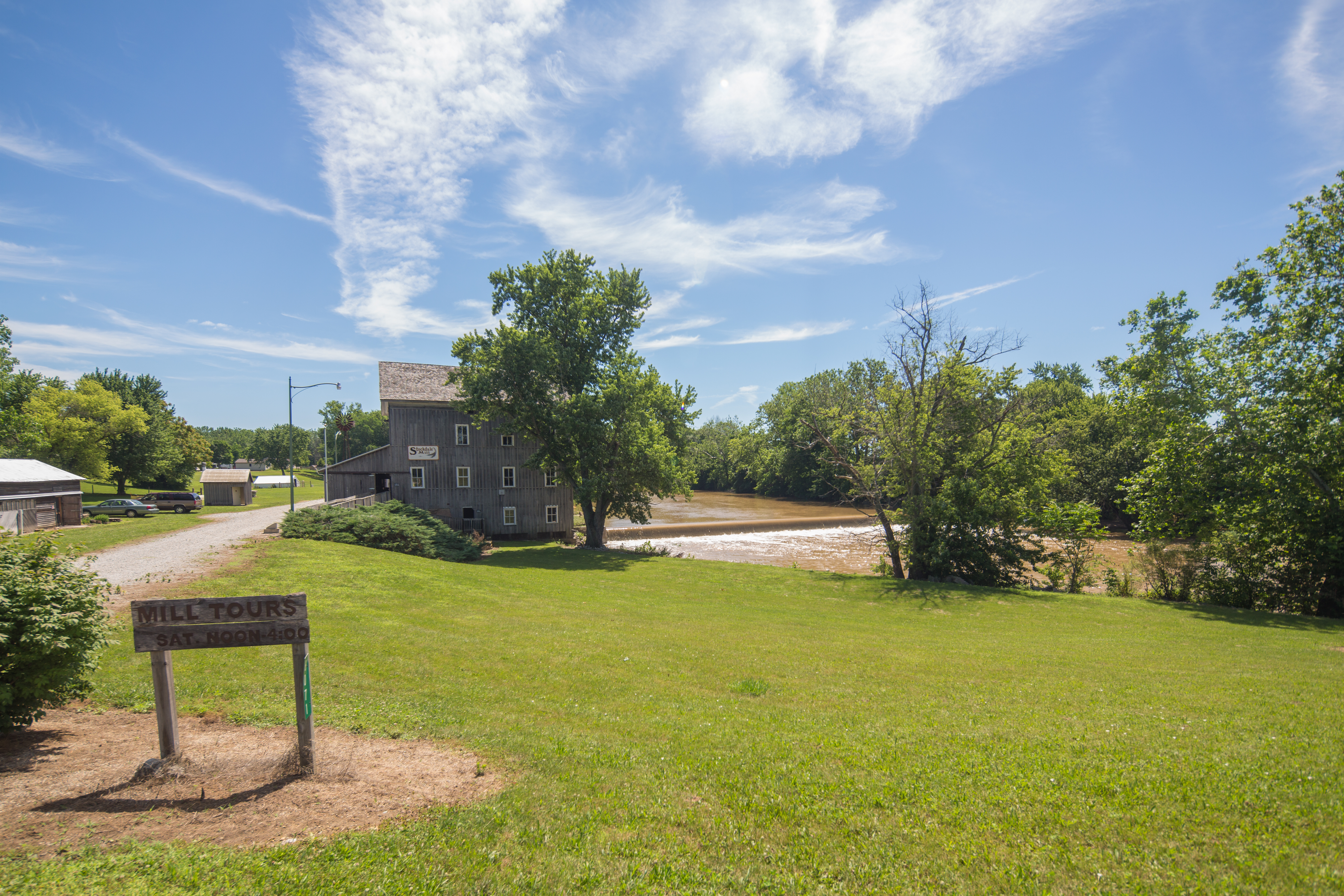

- Location within Indiana Location within the United States
- Coordinates: 40°54′54″N 85°56′39″W
- Country: United States
- State: Indiana
- County: Wabash, Miami
- Township: Paw Paw, Perry
- Elevation: 725 ft (221 m)
- Time zone: UTC-5 (Eastern (EST))
  - Summer (DST): UTC-4 (EDT)
- ZIP code: 46974
- FIPS code: 18-73286
- GNIS feature ID: 444180

Stockdale is an unincorporated community in Paw Paw Township, Wabash County and Miami County, in the U.S. state of Indiana.

== History ==
Stockdale was laid out by Thomas Goudy in 1837 on the line between Miami and Wabash counties. The early settlement was a trading point for settlers in that part of the county. The village declined after the Eel River Railroad was built nearby and Roann developed a short distance away.

The community's early development was tied to water-powered milling on the Eel River. A sawmill on the river was built in 1838, and a flour mill was built between about 1840 and 1845. That first flour mill stood out in the river and was later washed away by flooding.

The present Stockdale Mill was built on the north bank of the Eel River between 1855 and 1857. The mill was owned by the Deck and Krom families for more than 100 years and originally used buhr stones to grind local grain. In the late 1880s, the buhr stones were replaced by roller-milling equipment, and turbines were installed in 1909 and 1910. A weigh shed was added in 1904, and a concrete dam was built against the earlier timber dam in 1915.

The mill ceased flour production in 1964 but continued producing feed until 1972. The Stockdale Mill Foundation purchased the mill property in 2002, and public tours began the following year. The mill was listed on the National Register of Historic Places on March 24, 2004, as part of the Grain Mills in Indiana multiple property submission.
