= Upton Grey =

Village and parish in Hampshire, England

Coordinates: 51.2286°N 1.0008°W

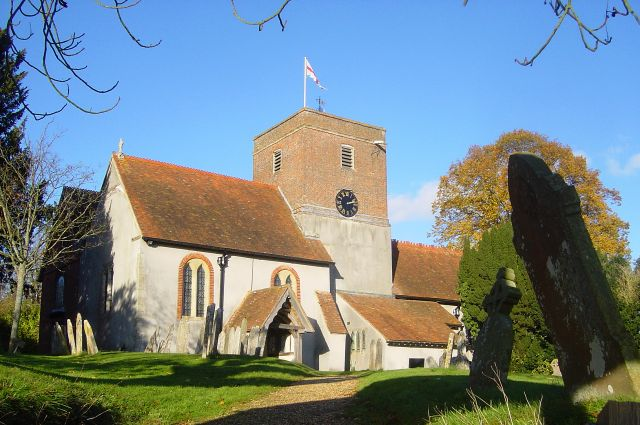
- St Mary's church

- Location within Hampshire
- Population: 608 (2011 Census)
- OS grid reference: SU6986748182
- Civil parish: Upton Grey
- District: Basingstoke and Deane
- Shire county: Hampshire
- Region: South East
- Country: England
- Sovereign state: United Kingdom
- Post town: Basingstoke
- Postcode district: RG25
- Dialling code: 01256
- Police: Hampshire and Isle of Wight
- Fire: Hampshire and Isle of Wight
- Ambulance: South Central
- UK Parliament: North East Hampshire

Upton Grey is a village and civil parish in Hampshire, England.

== History ==
=== Roman times ===
The village is on the line of an ancient Roman road, the Chichester to Silchester Way.

=== Norman times ===
The Grey derives from the years when the village was owned by the de Grey family and was used to differentiate the village from the many other Uptons.

=== Elizabethan times ===
The Manor House dates from Elizabethan times when the Matthew family lived there. The famous Elizabethan poet, George Puttenham, lived at Herriard House but also had a farm at Upton Grey. It was there that- at least according to his wife in their divorce proceedings- he kept his seventeen-year-old sex slave whom he had kidnapped in London. Eventually she was released when Puttenham's long suffering wife discovered her existence.

== Buildings ==
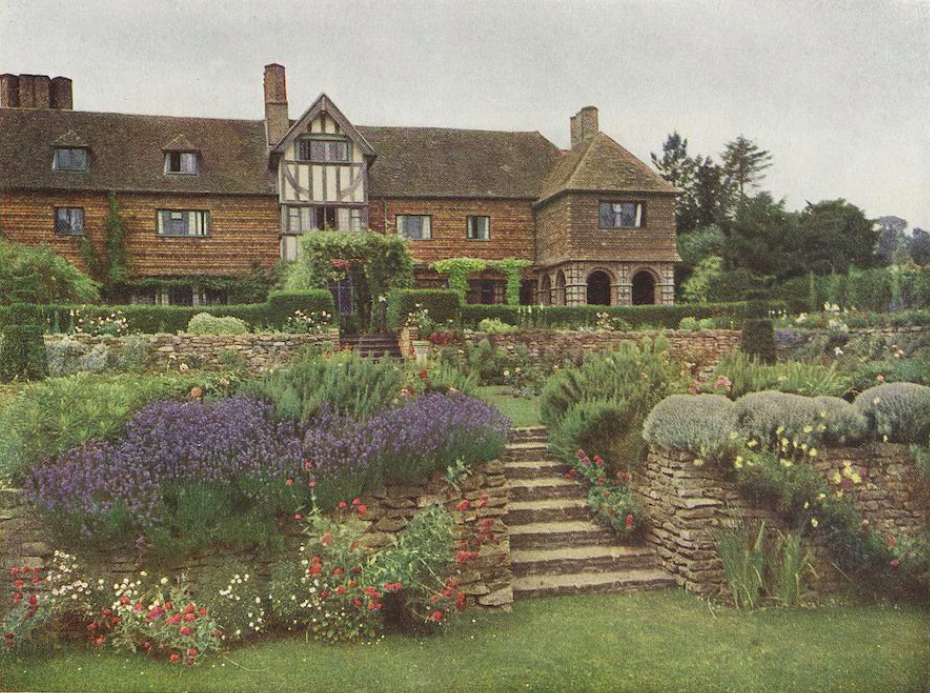
The Old Manor House, Upton Grey, Hampshire (1915)

=== Old Manor House ===
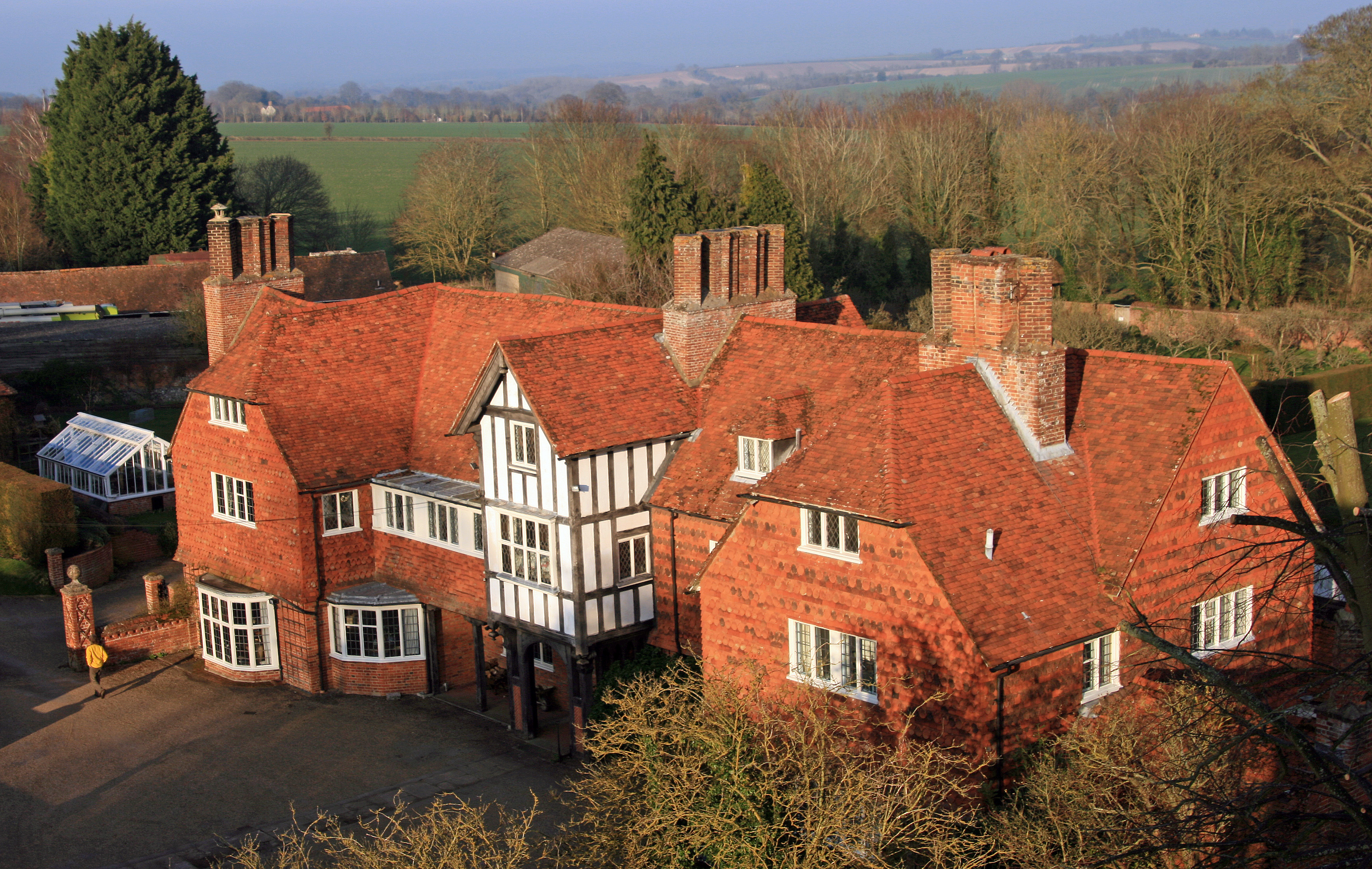
Upton Grey Manor (2012) by Hugh Chevallier

Charles Holme purchased several houses and a great deal of the surrounding land in Upton Grey. The Old Manor House, which he rented to tenants for the rest of his life, was in fragile condition. Holme then commissioned a local architect Ernest Newton to refurbish it, keeping many of the original timbers. Today's Edwardian decoration encloses oak rooms, a sixteenth-century staircase and original roof timbers. Newton's house was finished in 1907. Gertrude Jekyll created a four and a half acre garden around it.

=== Hoddington House ===
Hoddington House is a Grade II* Listed mansion built around 1700 by John Limbrey. Described by Nikolaus Pevsner as ‘by far the best house’ in Upton Grey, it is built on the site of a religious house called Edyndon, a monastery affiliated to the Abbey of Beaulieu in the New Forest. It was the childhood home of George Sclater-Booth, 1st Baron Basing and his brother, the naturalist Philip Sclater, and was sold in c1945 to Sir Edmund Stockdale, 1st Baronet.

=== St Mary's Church ===
Monuments in St Mary's Church include an alabaster wall monument to Dorothy Bulstrode, Lady Eyre (1592–1650), a lady in waiting to Queen Anne of Denmark, wife of King James VI and I, with her portrait bust and heraldry.

== Governance ==
The village of Upton Grey is part of the civil parish of Upton Grey, and is part of the Upton Grey and the Candovers ward of Basingstoke and Deane borough council. The borough council is a Non-metropolitan district of Hampshire County Council.

== Geography ==
Upton Grey is near Basingstoke, which lies to the north-west. There are various other villages located in all directions around the village, including:

- South Warnborough, to the east
- Greywell and Odiham, to the north-east
- Herriard, to the south
- Tunworth, to the west
- Weston Patrick, to the southwest

== Village amenities ==
There are various amenities in the village. These include the Upton Grey Village Shop, the Hoddington Arms public house, St Mary's Church, a village hall, a duck pond, and a war memorial to the south of the church.
